= Agua de la Piedra Formation =

Late Oligocene geologic formation in Mendoza Province, Argentina

- Stratigraphic range: Late Oligocene (Deseadan); ~26–23 Ma
- Type: Geological formation
- Unit of: Malargüe Group
- Sub-units: "Rodados Lustrosos" level
- Underlies: alluvium
- Overlies: Pircala-Coihueco Formation
- Thickness: 37 metres (121 ft) (tuffs)

Lithology
- Primary: Tuff
- Other: Paleosols

Location
- Coordinates: 36.6°S 69.7°W
- Approximate paleocoordinates: 37.8°S 62.9°W
- Region: southern Mendoza Province
- Country: Argentina
- Extent: southernmost Precordillera northernmost Neuquén Basin

Type section
- Named by: Gorroño et al.
- Location: Quebrada Fiera, Malargüe
- Year defined: 1979
- Coordinates: 36°33′13.3″S 69°42′3.5″W
- Region: Mendoza Province
- Country: Argentina
- Thickness at type section: 37 metres (121 ft) (tuffs)
- Agua de la Piedra Formation (Argentina)

The Agua de la Piedra Formation (FAP, Spanish names include Estratos de Agua de la Piedra and Complejo Volcano-sedimentario del Terciario inferior) is a Late Oligocene (Deseadan in the SALMA classification) geologic formation of the Malargüe Group that crops out in the southernmost Precordillera and northernmost Neuquén Basin in southern Mendoza Province, Argentina.

The strictly terrestrial tuffs and paleosols of the formation, geologically belonging to Patagonia, have provided a wealth of mammal fossils of various groups at Quebrada Fiera, including Mendozahippus fierensis, Pyrotherium, Coniopternium and Fieratherium. Terror birds reminiscent of the terror bird Andrewsornis and indeterminate remains of the phorusrhacid family have found in conjunction with the mammals.

== Regional geology ==
The Agua de la Piedra is geologically part of the Neuquén Basin, Argentina's most prolific onshore petroleum producing basin of northwestern Patagonia, and crops out in the geographical feature of the Andean orogeny; the Argentinian Precordillera of the higher Andes in the hinterland. The Malargüe Group, of which the Agua de la Piedra Formation is the uppermost unit, hosts among the most spectacular dinosaur fossils and nesting sites in the Allen Formation, the lowermost stratigraphic unit of the group.

The Jagüel Formation, overlying the Allen Formation, hosts the Cretaceous–Paleogene boundary and has provided fossils of marine reptiles including mosasaurs and the marine turtle Euclastes meridionalis. The Roca Formation, overlying the Jagüel Formation shows evidence of Atlantic waters depositing the evaporites, claystones and limestones of the formation.

The Neuquén Basin started forming in the latest Jurassic as one of the rift basins resulting from the break-up of Pangea. While the earlier formations in the basin are mostly distal terrestrial in nature, the Agua de la Piedra Formation is a unique combination of purely terrestrial influence (paleosols) with the early Andean volcanism in the form of tuffs.

== Oligocene South America ==
=== Climate ===
Global cooling occurred during the Oligocene

Eocene-Oligocene circum-Antarctic oceanic changes

Oligocene South America differed quite substantially from the Eocene period preceding it. Isolated from Gondwana for 70 million years, the continent had developed widespread lush forests with their own specific faunas. The climate drastically cooled at the Eocene-Oligocene boundary with global cooling as a result of the formation of the Antarctic Ocean current. The South American landscape became more arid than in the Eocene with ongoing volcanism related to the Andean orogeny affecting the local climates.

=== Oligocene fauna ===
The Oligocene of South America is characterized by the arrival of the first monkeys, possibly rafting from Africa, which in the Oligocene was significantly removed from South America. The first rodents had arrived to the island continent in the Late Eocene before, perhaps using similar methods of transoceanic transport. The rodents of South America diversified in the Oligocene. Cabeza Blanca, where the Sarmiento Formation outcrops, has provided the richest and most diverse Oligocene fauna of South America.

The cooler Oligocene climate led to the widespread extension of savanna and other grassland biomes. In the Early Oligocene, these rodents inhabited open and arid landscapes with wind-blown dust and grasslands environments.

==== Monkeys and rodents ====
The oldest confirmed New World monkey fossils stem from the Deseadan formations Salla in presently Andean Bolivia (the approximately 1,000 grams (2.2 lb) weighing Branisella boliviana and Szalatavus attricuspis half the size of Branisella) and the 2,000 g (4.4 lb) heavy Canaanimico from the Chambira of Amazonian Peru.

The rodents had arrived in the Late Eocene and diversified greatly during the Deseadan following the appearance of Andemys with species A. frassinettii and A. termasi in the Tinguirirican (Abanico Formation; Tinguiririca fauna). Caviomorphs arrived in Patagonia during the latest Eocene or early Oligocene, and by the Late Oligocene they were highly diversified, with representatives of the four main lineages. A great morphological disparity, at least in tooth morphology, was then acquired mainly by the development of hypsodonty in several lineages. The early evolution of each of the major clades was complex, especially for chinchilloids and octodontoids. The first stages of the evolution of cavioids are more obscure because they are recognized through the relatively derived Deseadan species of Cavioidea.

The Oligocene (Tinguirirican and Deseadan SALMAs plus La Cantera fauna) has a rich record of caviomorphs showing a greater morphological disparity than older faunas. Representatives of the four superfamilies, with the archetypal dental features that characterize species of the subsequent SALMAs, can be clearly recognized, at least since the Deseadan SALMA. Although a few genera (e.g., Andemys, Branisamys) cannot be assigned with certainty to any supra generic taxa. The Acaremyidae were likely a group of austral differentiation. The first representatives, the Deseadan Platypittamys brachyodon, Galileomys baios and Changquin woodi, attest to its differentiation into several lineages.

=== Oligocene volcanism ===
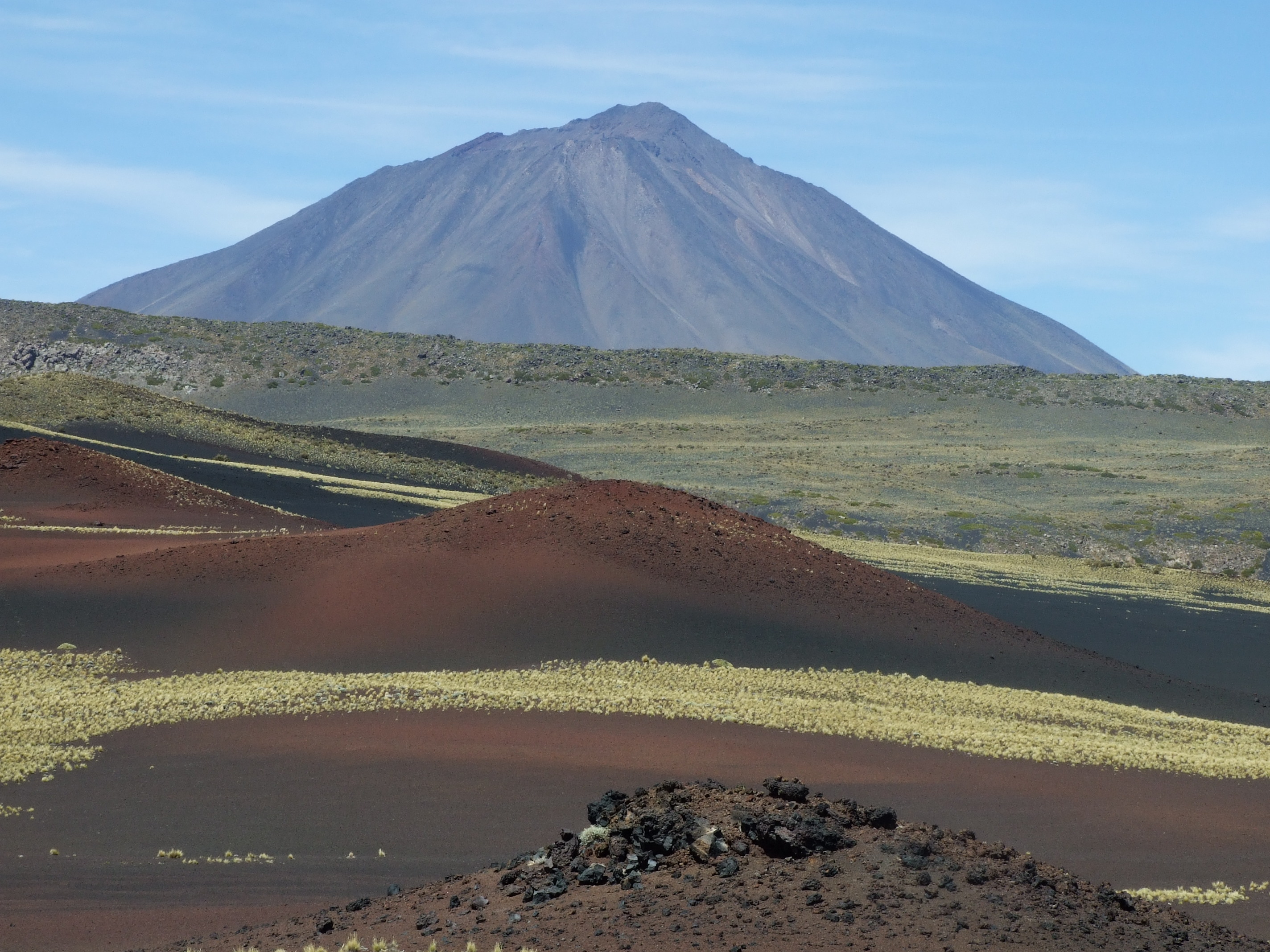
Payún Matrú volcano

Early Andean volcanism in the Southern Cone of South America dating to the Oligocene has been found in:

- Estratos de Pupunahue
- Estratos de San Pedro
- Caleta Chonos Formation
- Cheuquemó Formation
- Temuco Formation
- Oxaya Formation
- Ancud Volcanic Complex
- Cerro Ratones

== Description ==
The formation comprises the "Rodados Lustrosos" level, formed by clastic heterogeneous conglomerates in a silty matrix, considered as the stratigraphic evidence of the Pehuenche orogenic phase of the Andean orogeny, followed by uniform sequences, variable in thickness, of whitish-ocher tuffaceous paleosols with concretions and whitish-gray tuffs with intercalations of pyroclastic deposits.

The upper part of the Agua de la Piedra Formation consists of 37 metres (121 ft) of white-grayish tuffs and tobaceous paleosols, with laminated or massive parallel stratification constitute the fossiliferous level of Quebrada Fiera. The formation overlies the Pircala-Coihueco Formation.

=== Depositional environment ===
The studied profiles of the Agua de la Piedra Formation show large lateral lithological varieties, typical of alluvial fan depositional setings. The climate during deposition has been estimated to be semi-arid and the differential thicknesses of facies associations within the Agua de la Piedra Formation may represent the infill of minibasins in the forming foreland of the Andes. Sedimentary loading can enhance the effect of tectonic forces in foreland basins. The variety in volcanic fragments and composition indicates local ash fall caused by contemporaneous volcanism in the area of deposition.

2017 research on the Deseadan fauna (late Oligocene) from Quebrada Fiera, south of Mendoza Province, Argentina, evidences a rich mammal assemblage that shows the existence of common elements with Deseadan faunal associations of Patagonia and those of lower latitudes such as Salla, Bolivia, as well as endemic taxa of different groups.

Endemism refers to Notohippidae (Mendozahippus fierensis), Leontiniidae (Gualta cuyana), Homalodotheriidae (Asmodeus petrasnerus) and Metatheria (Fieratherium sorex); to these mammals a new terrestrial snail has been added in 2016.

Faunal data published in 2019 confirm the Deseadan age, but as per 2020, absolute dating is lacking for Quebrada Fiera.

== Paleontological significance ==
=== Quebrada Fiera ===
The Quebrada Fiera site is situated in the Malargüe Department, southern Mendoza Province, Argentina, in the foothills of the Andes Range. The fossiliferous levels are located at around 36°33′13.3″S 69°42′3.5″W at 1,300 to 1,406 metres (4,265 to 4,613 ft) elevation. The site was discovered during a geological prospection carried out by Yacimientos Petrolíferos Fiscales (YPF) in the late 1970s (Gorroño et al., 1979). Later on, other fossil bearing levels were found at the southern side of the ravine, located at around 36°33′26″S 69°41′35″W, 1,316 metres (4,318 ft) elevation.

The site is one of five recognized fossiliferous sites in Mendoza Province, with Divisadero Largo, where the Santacrucian Mariño Formarion is found, Huaquerías, defining the Huayquerian in the Huayquerías Formation, the Aisol Formation of central Mendoza and the Uspallata Group and Carrizal Formations in the north of the province.

The geological characterization and the preliminary faunal list were published by Gorroño et al. (1979). The faunal assemblage was then assigned to the Late Oligocene (Deseadan SALMA) based on the presence of two typical representatives of the Deseadean fauna of Patagonia; Pyrotherium Ameghino 1888 and Proborhyaena gigantea Ameghino 1897, both also found in the Puesto Almendra member of the Sarmiento Formation.

The species epithet Mendozahippus fierensis and genus Fieratherium refer to Quebrada Fiera.

Stable isotope analysis of tooth enamel from the Quebrada Fiera ungulates suggests the environment was C_{3} plant-dominated, characterized as a mosaic landscape including woodland–mesic C_{3} grasslands supported by (semi)permanent water bodies, within a larger matrix of open woodland–arid C_{3} grasslands. The estimated mean annual precipitation for the area was approximately 203 mm/year, suggesting semi-desert conditions where local hydrology played a critical role in sustaining herbivore diversity.

=== Fossil content ===
The formation has provided fossils of:

Group	Clade	Taxa	Site	Images	Notes
Ungulates	Macraucheniidae	Coniopternium andinum	Quebrada Fiera North		
Ungulates	Proterotheriidae	cf. Lambdaconus suinus	Quebrada Fiera North		
Ungulates	Pyrotheriidae	Pyrotherium romeroi	Quebrada Fiera North		
Ungulates	Pyrotheriidae	Pyrotherium sp.	Quebrada Fiera South		
Ungulates	Litopterna	Litopterna indet.	Quebrada Fiera North		
Cingulata	Dasypodidae	Meteutatus aff. lagenaformis	Quebrada Fiera North		
Cingulata	Dasypodidae	Mendozaphractus cumpuchu	Quebrada Fiera North		
Cingulata	Dasypodidae	Peltephilus quebradensis	Quebrada Fiera North		
Cingulata	Dasypodidae	?Prozaedyus aff. impressus	Quebrada Fiera North		
Cingulata	Dasypodidae	Stenotatus aff. ornatus	Quebrada Fiera North		
Xenarthra	Glyptodontinae	Clypeotherium mobilis	Quebrada Fiera North		
Xenarthra	Megatheroidea	Similhapalops nivis	Quebrada Fiera North		
Notoungulata	Notohippidae	Mendozahippus fierensis	Quebrada Fiera South		
Notoungulata	Notohippidae	Mendozahippus fierensis	Quebrada Fiera North		
Notoungulata	Notohippidae	Notohippidae indet.	Quebrada Fiera North		
Notoungulata	Archaeohyracidae	cf. Archaeotypotherium sp.	Quebrada Fiera North		
Notoungulata	Archaeohyracidae	Archaeohyrax suniensis	Quebrada Fiera North		
Notoungulata	Hegetotheriidae	Prosotherium garzoni	Quebrada Fiera North		
Notoungulata	Hegetotheriidae	cf. Prosotherium sp.	Quebrada Fiera North		
Notoungulata	Hegetotheriidae	Prohegetotherium malalhuense	Quebrada Fiera North		
Notoungulata	Hegetotheriidae	P. schiaffinoi	Quebrada Fiera North		
Notoungulata	Hegetotheriidae	P. cf. sculptum	Quebrada Fiera North		
Notoungulata	Hegetotheriidae	Prohegetotherium sp.	Quebrada Fiera North		
Notoungulata	Hegetotheriidae	Hegetotheriopsis sulcatus	Quebrada Fiera North		
Notoungulata	Homalodotheriidae	Asmodeus petrasnerus	Quebrada Fiera North		
Notoungulata	Interatheriidae	Argyrohyrax proavus	Quebrada Fiera North		
Notoungulata	Interatheriidae	Progaleopithecus sp.	Quebrada Fiera North		
Notoungulata	Interatheriidae	Interatheriidae indet.	Quebrada Fiera South		
Notoungulata	Leontiniidae	Gualta cuyana	Quebrada Fiera North		
Notoungulata	Mesotheriidae	Trachytherus cf. spegazzinianus	Quebrada Fiera North		
Notoungulata	Toxodontidae	Proadinotherium sp.	Quebrada Fiera North		
Notoungulata	Toxodontidae	Toxodontidae indet.	Quebrada Fiera North		
Rodents	Acaremyidae	Acaremyidae indet.	Quebrada Fiera North		
Sparassodonta	Borhyaenidae	Pharsophorus sp.	Quebrada Fiera North		
Sparassodonta	Proborhyaenidae	Proborhyaena gigantea	Quebrada Fiera North		
Theriiformes		Fieratherium sorex	Quebrada Fiera North		
Birds	Phorusrhacidae	cf. Andrewsornis sp.	Quebrada Fiera North		
Birds	Phorusrhacidae	Phorusrhacidae indet.	Quebrada Fiera South		
Invertebrates	Gastropods	Gastropoda indet.	Quebrada Fiera North		

=== SALMA correlations ===
The Deseadan South American land mammal age (SALMA) is equivalent to the Arikareean in the North American land mammal age (NALMA) and the Harrisonian in the 2000 version of the classification. It overlaps with the Hsandagolian of Asia and the MP 25 zone of Europe, the Waitakian and the Landon epoch of New Zealand.

Deseadan correlations in South America
Formation	Rancahué	Guillermo	Mariño	Deseado	Sarmiento	Salla	Lacayani	Fray Bentos	Moquegua	Chambira	Barzalosa	Tremembé	Cascadas	Map
Basin	Neuquén	Austral	Cuyo	Deseado	San Jorge	Salla	Subandean	Norte	Moquegua	Ucayali	VSM	Taubaté	Panama	Agua de la Piedra Formation (South America)
Country	Argentina					Bolivia		Uruguay	Peru		Colombia	Brazil	Panama	Agua de la Piedra Formation (South America)
Archaeohyrax														Agua de la Piedra Formation (South America)
Prohegetotherium														Agua de la Piedra Formation (South America)
Pyrotherium														Agua de la Piedra Formation (South America)
Pharsophorus														Agua de la Piedra Formation (South America)
Trachytherus														Agua de la Piedra Formation (South America)
Proadinotherium														Agua de la Piedra Formation (South America)
Proborhyaena														Agua de la Piedra Formation (South America)
Meteutatus														Agua de la Piedra Formation (South America)
Andrewsornis														Agua de la Piedra Formation (South America)
Terror birds														Agua de la Piedra Formation (South America)
Rodents														Agua de la Piedra Formation (South America)
Reptiles														Agua de la Piedra Formation (South America)
Primates														Agua de la Piedra Formation (South America)
Flora														Agua de la Piedra Formation (South America)
Insects														Agua de la Piedra Formation (South America)
Environments	Alluvial	Fluvial	Eolian Alluvial-fluvial	Fluvial		Alluvial	Fluvial-alluvial	Fluvial	Fluvio-lacustrine		Alluvial-fluvial	Lacustrine	Fluvial	Deseadan volcanoclastics Deseadan fauna Deseadan flora
Volcanic	Yes				Yes	Yes	Yes		Yes				Yes	Deseadan volcanoclastics Deseadan fauna Deseadan flora

== See also ==
- Abanico Formation
- Dos Bocas Formation
- Collón Curá Formation
- Gaiman Formation
- Honda Group
- Itaboraí Formation
- Ituzaingó Formation
- Laguna del Hunco Formation
- Deseadan formations
