= List of plesiosaur-bearing stratigraphic units =

| Group or Formation | Period | Country | Notes |
|---|---|---|---|
| Adaffa Formation | Cretaceous | Saudi Arabia | |
| Agardhfjellet Formation | Jurassic | Norway | |
| Agrio Formation | Cretaceous | Argentina | |
| Akrabou Formation | Cretaceous | Morocco | |
| Allaru Mudstone Formation | Cretaceous | Australia | |
| Allen Formation | Cretaceous | Argentina | |
| Alum Shale Formation | Jurassic | United Kingdom | |
| Ampthill Clay Formation | Jurassic | United Kingdom | |
| Ancholme Group/Kimmeridge Clay Formation | Jurassic | United Kingdom | |
| Ancholme Group/Oxford Clay Formation | Jurassic | France; United Kingdom | |
| Arauco Group/Quiriquina Formation | Cretaceous | Chile | |
| Arcillas de Morella Formation | Cretaceous | Spain | |
| Arctic Red Formation | Cretaceous | Canada | |
| Argiles de Châtillon Formation | Jurassic | France | |
| Argiles de Montaubert Formation | Jurassic | France | |
| Argille Varicolori Formation | Cretaceous | Italy | |
| Artemesia Formation | Jurassic | Cuba | |
| Artoles Formation | Cretaceous | Spain | |
| Ashville Formation | Cretaceous | Canada | |
| Balqa Group/Phosphorite Unit Formation | Cretaceous | Jordan | |
| Barrow Formation | Cretaceous | Australia | |
| Barrow Group/Birdrong Sandstone Formation | Cretaceous | Australia | |
| Bearpaw Formation | Cretaceous | Canada; United States | |
| Bearpaw Shale Formation | Cretaceous | United States | |
| Belly River Formation | Cretaceous | Canada | |
| Belly River Group/Dinosaur Park Formation | Cretaceous | Canada | |
| Bissekty Formation | Cretaceous | Uzbekistan | |
| Blue Lias Formation | Jurassic | United Kingdom | |
| Braunjura Group/Braunjura alpha & Braunjura beta Formation | Jurassic | France | |
| Bückeberg Formation | Cretaceous | Germany | |
| Calcaire de Caen Formation | Jurassic | France | |
| Calcaire à Bélemnites Formation | Jurassic | France | |
| Calcaires de MoulinFormation | Jurassic | France | |
| Calcaires à Spatangues Formation | Cretaceous | France | |
| Calcareous Grit Formation | Jurassic | United Kingdom | |
| Carlile Shale Formation | Cretaceous | United States | |
| Chalk Formation | Cretaceous | United Kingdom | |
| Chalk Group/"Upper Chalk" Formation | Cretaceous | United Kingdom | |
| Chalk Group/Lower Chalk Formation | Cretaceous | United Kingdom | |
| Chalk Group/LowerFormation | Cretaceous | United Kingdom | |
| Chalk Group/LowerFormation | Cretaceous | United Kingdom | |
| Champion Bay Group/Colalura Sandstone Formation | Jurassic | Australia | |
| Charmouth Mudstone Formation | Jurassic | United Kingdom | |
| Chico Formation | Cretaceous | United States | |
| Chico Group/Moreno Formation | Cretaceous | United States | |
| Clearwater Formation | Cretaceous | Canada | |
| Colorado Group/Belle Fourche Formation | Cretaceous | Canada; United States | |
| Colorado Group/Carlile Shale Formation | Cretaceous | United States | |
| Colorado Group/Graneros Shale Formation | Cretaceous | United States | |
| Colorado Group/Greenhorn Limestone Formation | Cretaceous | United States | |
| Colorado Group/Niobrara Formation | Cretaceous | Canada; United States | |
| Conway Formation | Cretaceous | New Zealand | |
| Conway Siltstone Formation | Cretaceous | New Zealand | |
| Coon Creek Formation | Cretaceous | United States | |
| Coral Rag Formation | Jurassic | United Kingdom | |
| Corallian Oolite Formation | Jurassic | United Kingdom | |
| Corallian Group/Coral Rag Formation | Jurassic | United Kingdom | |
| Corallian Group/Kingston Formation | Jurassic | United Kingdom | |
| Couche III Formation | Cretaceous | Morocco | |
| Cuyo Group/Los Molles Formation | Jurassic | Argentina | |
| Dinosaur Park Formation | Cretaceous | Canada | |
| Dorotea Formation | Cretaceous | Chile | |
| Duwi Formation | Cretaceous | Egypt | |
| Eagle Ford Formation | Cretaceous | United States | |
| Eagle Ford Group/Britton Formation | Cretaceous | United States | |
| Estratos de Quebrada Municipalidad Formation | Cretaceous | Chile | |
| Eutaw Formation | Cretaceous | United States | |
| Evergreen Formation | Jurassic | Australia | |
| Favel Formation | Cretaceous | Canada | |
| Fernie Formation | Jurassic | Canada | |
| Frontier Formation | Cretaceous | United States | |
| Futaba Group/Ashizawa Formation | Cretaceous | Japan | |
| Futaba Group/Tamayama Formation | Cretaceous | Japan | |
| Great Estuarine Formation | Jurassic | United Kingdom | |
| Great Estuarine Series Group/Estheria Shales Formation | Jurassic | United Kingdom | |
| Great Estuarine Group/Lealt Shale Formation | Jurassic | United Kingdom | |
| Great Oolite Formation | Jurassic | France | |
| Gres de Mortinsart Formation | Triassic | Belgium | |
| Grès de Infralias Formation | Triassic | France | |
| Grünsandstein Formation | Cretaceous | Germany | |
| Hailey Shales Formation | Cretaceous | United States | |
| Hasle Formation | Jurassic | Denmark | |
| Hastings Formation | Cretaceous | United Kingdom | |
| Hastings Beds Group/Wadhurst Clay Formation | Cretaceous | United Kingdom | |
| Hell Creek Formation | Cretaceous | United States | |
| Hiccles Cove Formation | Jurassic | Canada | |
| Hornerstown Formation | Cretaceous | United States | |
| Isachsen Formation | Cretaceous | Canada | |
| Itapecuru Formation | Cretaceous | Brazil | |
| Alcântara Formation | Cretaceous | Brazil | |
| Jagua Formation | Jurassic | Cuba | |
| Jagüel Formation | Cretaceous | Argentina | |
| Judith River Formation | Cretaceous | Canada; United States | |
| Kajlâka Formation | Cretaceous | Bulgaria | |
| Kangauz Formation | Cretaceous | Russian Federation | |
| Kanguk Formation | Cretaceous | Canada | |
| Katiki Formation | Cretaceous | New Zealand | |
| Katrol Formation | Jurassic | India | |
| Kimmeridge Clay Formation | Jurassic | France; United Kingdom | |
| Kunrade Formation | Cretaceous | Netherlands | |
| La Cabana Formation | Cretaceous | Spain | |
| La Caja Formation | Jurassic | Mexico | |
| La Casita Formation | Jurassic | Mexico | |
| La Colonia Formation | Cretaceous | Argentina | |
| La Luna Formation | Cretaceous | Venezuela | |
| Lajas Formation | Jurassic | Argentina | |
| Lake Waco Formation | Cretaceous | United States | |
| Laramie Formation | Cretaceous | United States | |
| Lias Formation | Jurassic | United Kingdom | |
| Lias Formation | Jurassic | United Kingdom | |
| Lias Group/Blue Lias Formation | Jurassic | United Kingdom | |
| Lias Group/Charmouth Mudstone Formation | Jurassic | United Kingdom | |
| Lias Group/Dyrham Formation | Jurassic | United Kingdom | |
| Lias Group/Marlstone Rock Formation | Jurassic | United Kingdom | |
| Lias Group/Scunthorpe Mudstone Formation | Triassic | United Kingdom | |
| Lias Group/Waterloo Mudstone Formation | Jurassic | United Kingdom | |
| Lias Group/Whitby Mudstone Formation | Jurassic | United Kingdom | |
| López de Bertodano Formation | Cretaceous | Antarctica | |
| Los Alamitos Formation | Cretaceous | Argentina | |
| Lower Chalk Group/Cambridge Greensand Formation | Cretaceous | United Kingdom | |
| Lower Green Sand Formation | Cretaceous | Russian Federation | |
| Lower Greensand Group/Faringdon Sand Formation | Cretaceous | United Kingdom | |
| Lower Greensand Group/Hythe Formation | Cretaceous | United Kingdom | |
| Luxembourg Sandstone Formation | Jurassic | Luxembourg | |
| López de Bertodano Formation | Cretaceous | Antarctica | |
| Maaree Group/Bulldog Shale Formation | Cretaceous | Australia | |
| Maastricht Formation | Cretaceous | Belgium; Netherlands | |
| Malargue Group/Roca Formation | Cretaceous | Argentina | |
| Malargüe Formation | Cretaceous | Argentina | |
| Malargüe Group/Allen Formation | Cretaceous | Argentina | |
| Malargüe Group/Loncoche Formation | Cretaceous | Argentina | |
| Mannville Group/Clearwater Formation | Cretaceous | Canada | |
| Marambio Group/Snow Hill Island Formation | Cretaceous | Antarctica | |
| Marnes de Dives Formation | Jurassic | France | |
| Marnes de Gravelotte (=La Gravclotte Marls) Formation | Jurassic | France | |
| Marree Group/Bulldog Shale Formation | Cretaceous | Australia | |
| Mata Amarilla Formation | Cretaceous | Argentina | |
| Mata Group/Tahora Formation | Cretaceous | New Zealand | |
| Melovatka Formation | Cretaceous | Russian Federation | |
| Mesaverde Formation | Cretaceous | United States | |
| Middle Keuper Group/Knollenmergel Formation | Triassic | Switzerland | |
| Middle Keuper Group/Trossingen Formation | Triassic | Germany | |
| Middle Yezo Formation | Cretaceous | Japan | |
| Middle Yezo Group/Chenaibo Formation | Cretaceous | Japan | |
| Molecap Greensand | Cretaceous | Australia | |
| Monmouth Group/Navesink Formation | Cretaceous | United States | |
| Mont Formation | Jurassic | France | |
| Montana Group/Pierre Shale Formation | Cretaceous | United States | |
| Moreno Formation | Cretaceous | United States | |
| Navesink Formation | Cretaceous | United States | |
| Nekum Formation | Cretaceous | Netherlands | |
| Neuquén Group/Anacleto Formation | Cretaceous | Argentina | |
| Newcastle Formation | Triassic | New Zealand | |
| Niobrara Formation | Cretaceous | United States | |
| Otway Group/Eumeralla Formation | Cretaceous | Australia | |
| Oxford Clay Formation | Jurassic | United Kingdom | |
| Paja Formation | Cretaceous | Colombia | |
| Paso del Sapo Formation | Cretaceous | Argentina | |
| Penarth Group/Westbury Formation | Triassic | United Kingdom | |
| Penarth Group/White Lias Formation | Triassic | United Kingdom | |
| Pender Formation | Cretaceous | Canada | |
| Pernarth Group/Westbury Formation | Triassic | United Kingdom | |
| Pierre Shale Formation | Cretaceous | Canada; United States | |
| Point Lookout Formation | Cretaceous | United States | |
| Portland Oolite Formation | Jurassic | United Kingdom | |
| Portland Group/Portland Stone Formation | Jurassic | United Kingdom | |
| Posidonia Shale | Jurassic | Germany | |
| Purbeck Formation | Cretaceous, Jurassic | United Kingdom | |
| Purbeck Group/Lulworth Formation | Cretaceous, Jurassic | United Kingdom | |
| Puskwaskau Formation | Cretaceous | Canada | |
| Querecual Formation | Cretaceous | Venezuela | |
| Quiriquina Formation | Cretaceous | Chile | |
| Raritan Formation | Cretaceous | United States | |
| Razorback Beds Formation | Jurassic | Australia | |
| Rio del Lago Formation | Triassic | Italy | |
| Rodiles Formation | Jurassic | Spain | |
| Rolling Downs Group/Griman Creek Formation | Cretaceous | Australia | |
| Rolling Downs Group/Toolebuc Formation | Cretaceous | Australia | |
| Rolling Downs Group/Wallumbilla Formation | Cretaceous | Australia | |
| Rolling Downs Group/Winton Formation | Cretaceous | Australia | |
| Rosablanca Formation | Cretaceous | Colombia | |
| Rosso Ammonitico Veronese Formation | Jurassic | Italy | |
| Rybushka Formation | Cretaceous | Russian Federation | |
| Sables de Glos Formation | Jurassic | France | |
| Saint Formation | Cretaceous | Belgium | |
| Santa Marta Formation | Cretaceous | Antarctica | |
| Savel'evsk oil shales Formation | Jurassic | Russian Federation | |
| Scalpa Sandstone Formation | Jurassic | United Kingdom | |
| Selborne Group/Upper Greensand Formation | Cretaceous | United Kingdom | |
| Selma Group/Mooreville Chalk Formation | Cretaceous | United States | |
| Severn Formation | Cretaceous | United States | |
| Snow Hill Island Formation | Cretaceous | Antarctica | |
| Speeton Clay Formation | Cretaceous | United Kingdom | |
| Spilsby Sandstone Formation | Jurassic | United Kingdom | |
| Staffin Bay Formation | Jurassic | United Kingdom | |
| Strzelecki Group/Wonthaggi Formation | Cretaceous | Australia | |
| Sundance Formation | Jurassic | United States | |
| São Gião Formation | Jurassic | Portugal | |
| Tadi Beds Formation | Cretaceous | Angola | |
| Taylor Marl' Formation | Cretaceous | United States | |
| Tessé Sandstones Formation | Jurassic | France | |
| Thermopolis Shale Formation | Cretaceous | United States | |
| Tioriori Group/Takatika Grit Formation | Cretaceous | New Zealand | |
| Toolebuc Formation | Cretaceous | Australia | |
| Tropic Shale Formation | Cretaceous | United States | |
| Trossingen Formation | Triassic | Switzerland | |
| Tugulu Group/Lianmugin Formation | Cretaceous | China | |
| Uitenhage series Formation | Cretaceous | South Africa | |
| Uitenhage Group/Sundays River Formation | Cretaceous | South Africa | |
| Upper Chalk Formation | Cretaceous | United Kingdom | |
| Upper Gondwana Group/Umia Formation | Jurassic | India | |
| Upper Greensand Formation | Cretaceous | United Kingdom | |
| Upper Keuper Group/Exter Formation | Triassic | Germany | |
| Vaca Muerta Formation | Cretaceous, Jurassic | Argentina | |
| Vermillion River Formation | Cretaceous | Canada | |
| Wallumbilla Formation | Cretaceous | Australia | |
| Waterloo Formation | Jurassic | United Kingdom | |
| Weald Clay Group/Upper Weald Clay Formation | Cretaceous | United Kingdom | |
| Wealden Group/Tunbridge Wells Sand Formation | Cretaceous | United Kingdom | |
| Wealden Group/Vectis Formation | Cretaceous | United Kingdom | |
| Whitby Mudstone Formation | Jurassic | United Kingdom | |
| Wilczek Formation | Triassic | Russian Federation | |
| Wilgunya Group/Toolebuc Formation | Cretaceous | Australia | |
| Wilhelmøya Formation | Triassic | Norway | |
| Xiashaximiao Formation | Jurassic | China | |
| Ziliujing Formation | Jurassic | China | |
