= Caleta Chonos Formation =

Geological formation in Chile

- Stratigraphic range: Oligocene
- Type: Geological formation
- Underlies: Ancud Volcanic Complex
- Overlies: Bahía Mansa Metamorphic Complex

Lithology
- Primary: Conglomerate, sandstone
- Other: Coal, tuff breccia

Location
- Coordinates: 41.8°S 74.0°W
- Region: Los Lagos Region
- Country: Chile
- Extent: Lacuy Peninsula

Type section
- Named for: Caleta Chonos
- Caleta Chonos Formation (Chile)

Caleta Chonos Formation (Spanish: Formación Caleta Chonos) is a geological formation of Oligocene age located around Chacao Channel in southern Chile. The formation overlies Bahía Mansa Metamorphic Complex and is overlain by the Ancud Volcanic Complex. It crops out in northwestern Chiloé Island in the isthmus of Lacuy Peninsula.

== See also ==
- Parga Formation
- Lacui Formation
