= Coal mining in Chile =

Location of selected mines and deposits.

In Chile, coal mining is restricted to a few places located in its southern half. Energy originating from coal stands for 11,6% of Chile's electricity consumption. Currently the country is not considered a major producer of coal.

The three zones of mining are Zona Central Sur (36–38° S), Zona Sur (Note: Not to be confused with the natural region of Zona Sur.) (39–42° S) and Zona Austral (Note: Not to be confused with the natural region of Zona Austral.) (51–54° S) in southernmost Chile. Most of the coal resources of Chile lie in Zona Austral at southernmost Chile.

Coal districts of Chile
District	Sub-district	Coal-bearing formations	Coal age	Sedimentary basin	Coal grade	Large-scale mining at present
Zona Central Sur	Sector Norte			Itata Basin	Sub-bituminous	No
Zona Central Sur	Sector Sur	Curanilahue Formation, Trihueco Formation	Eocene	Arauco Basin	Bituminous	No
Zona Sur		Pupunahue Beds, Mulpún Beds, Cheuquemó Formation, Parga Formation	Eocene or Oligo–Miocene	Pupunahue-Mulpún Neogene Carboniferous Basin, Osorno–Llanquihue Basin	Sub-bituminous	No, mining ceased in the early 2000s
Zona Austral		Loreto Formation	Eocene-Oligocene	Magallanes Basin	Lignitic and Sub-bituminous	No, mining in Invierno ceased in 2020

== Zona Central Sur ==
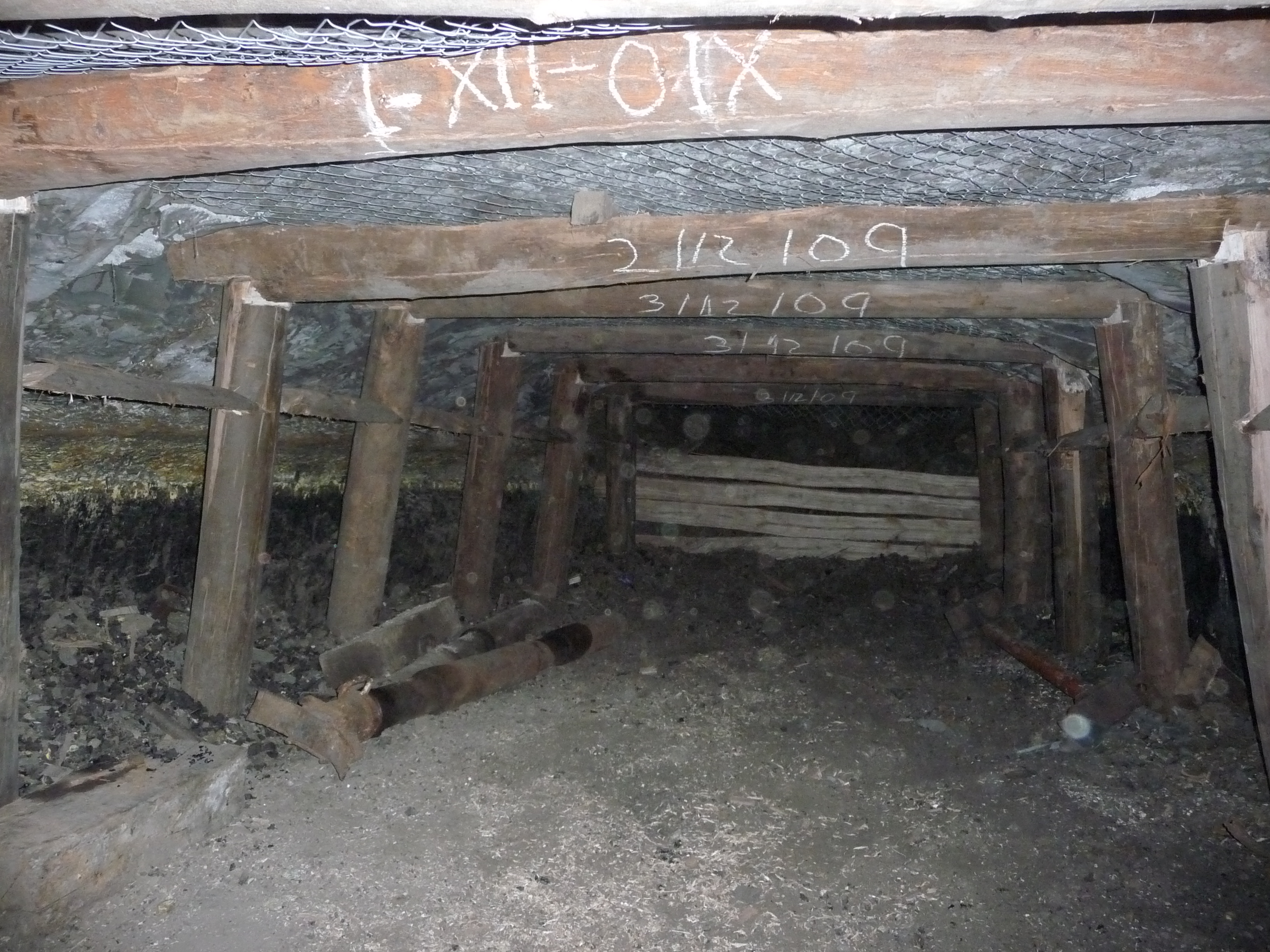
Interior of the El Chiflón del Diablo coal mine at Lota.

Usage of coal from Bío Bío Region as fuel dates back to at least 1557 when, according to Diego de Rosales, governor García Hurtado de Mendoza stayed in Quiriquina Island. Early British travelers had differing opinions on the economic value of Chilean coals, or more specifically, the coals of Zona Central Sur. While David Barry found the coals to be of good quality, Charles Darwin found them of little value. The British consul in Chile correctly predicted in 1825 that the area around the mouth of Biobío River would be a centre of coal industry.

It was however not until the mid-19th century that large scale coal mining began in the region. The initial trigger of coal mining was the arrival of steamships to the port of Talcahuano. These steam ships, most of whom were English, bought initially the coal very cheaply and the exploited coal seams were easy to work as they laid almost at ground level. The mining district of Biobío Region can be divided in two sectors: one south and one north of Biobío River.

=== Sector Norte ===
In the northern sector the mine of Lirquén, which provided coal to the cement plant of "Melón" was once the most important one. The northern sector contains sub-bituminous coal.

=== Sector Sur ===
The coals of the southern sector, i.e. those of Arauco Basin, are chiefly of bituminous nature. Industrialist Matías Cousiño begun mining operations in Lota in 1852. Coal mining transformed rapidly Lota, from being a sparsely populated frontier zone in the mid-19th century, into a large industrial hub that attracted immigrants from all over Chile well into the 20th century. Lota's coal mines were nationalized by Salvador Allende due to civil unrest and heavy Socialist support, but privatized again under Augusto Pinochet. Given a high density of geological faults that displace the coal beds and the thin nature of these (less than one metre) mining activity in Arauco Basin proved difficult to mechanize. Traditionally the centre of coal mining in Chile, large-scale coal mining in Arauco Basin ended in the 1990s. Despite the decline of the coal industry communities in the zone continue to identify with it.

The following mines were at times active in Sector Sur of Zona Centro Sur: El Chiflón del Diablo, El Chiflón Costa, Mina Consolidada, Mina Chiflones Fortuna, Mina Manto Grande, Mina Socavón Victoria, Pique Anita and others.

== Zona Sur ==
The Zona Sur coal district spans the regions of Los Ríos and Los Lagos, roughly from the area of Valdivia to Chiloé Archipelago. The coals of the Zona Sur district are sub-bituminous.

The geological context of the coals of Zona Sur is not fully understood as there are divergent views on the stratigraphy and the ages the coals. The study of the coals is hampered by the fact that there are few coal outcrops and attempted correlation between different localities has not been satisfactory. Age estimations vary. A common view is that the coals of Zona Sur are of Oligo-Miocene age being thus younger than those of Arauco Basin further north. Yet findings of foraminifers appear to indicate for older ages, that is Eocene. The geological units containing economically significant amounts of coal are the Pupunahue Beds, the very similar Mulpún Beds, Cheuquemó Formation and Parga Formation.

Some of the better known coal mines of Los Ríos Region are: Arrau, Catamutún, Ciruelo, Máfil, Mulpún and Pupunahue. While these mines had occasional spurts in activity only Catamutún was in continuous operation in the 1940s–2001 period. Mining in Catamutún, the only active coal mine in Los Ríos Region at the time, halted after an underground fire in 2001.

During a period of the 20th century the electric grid of the city of Valdivia was powered by coal from the mines near Máfil. Starting in 2009 Antofagasta Minerals and Carbon Energy developed together an underground coal gasification project in the closed Mulpún mine, however the project was put on hold in 2013.

Somewhat south, in Los Lagos Region, coal beds can be found in the geological formations of Cheuquemó and Parga. The thin coal beds of this last formation were subject of small-scale mining operations around the turn of the 20th century.

== Zona Austral ==
In Magallanes Region, Riesco Island is being investigated for new projects. Coal was first discovered in Magallanes Region by Pedro Sarmiento de Gamboa who visited the Straits of Magellan in 1584.

The following mines have been exploited in Zona Austral over the years: Chilenita, Chinita, El Chino, Estela, Elena, Fernández Rocuant, Invierno, Josefina, Loreto, Magdalena, Natales, Peckett, Punta Arenas, Servidora, Soledad, Tres Hermanos, Tres Pasos, Tres Puentes, Vulcano.
