= Parga Formation =

Geological formation in Chile

- Stratigraphic range: Late Oligocene–Middle Miocene
- Underlies: Pliocene and/or Quaternary sediments
- Overlies: Bahía Mansa Metamorphic Complex
- Thickness: 750 m (2,460 ft)

Lithology
- Primary: Conglomerate, sandstone, mudstone
- Other: Tuff, coal

Location
- Coordinates: 41.5°S 73.7°W
- Region: Los Lagos Region
- Country: Chile

Type section
- Named for: Caleta Parga
- Named by: Flores
- Year defined: 1976
- Parga Formation (Chile)

Parga Formation (Spanish: Formación Parga) is a geological formation of sedimentary rock in south-central Chile. The sediments of the formation were deposited during the Late Oligocene and Middle Miocene epochs. The formation's lower sections are made up of conglomerate, sandstone and mudstone some of which is rich in organic material. Additionally there are thin beds of tuff and coal. The formation's composition indicates that sedimentation occurred in an estuarine (paralic) and marine environments. Stratigraphically it overlies the Bahía Mansa Metamorphic Complex and is similar in age and type to Lacui Formation to the south and Cheuquemó and Santo Domingo Formation to the north. It is overlain across an angular unconformity by Pliocene or Quaternary sediments. The formation is intruded by porphyritic trachyte of Oligocene to Miocene age (Ancud Volcanic Complex). The outcrops of the formation are restricted to a NW-SE strip near Caleta Parga north of the estuary of Maullín River.

== See also ==
- Coal mining in Chile
