= District 24 (Chamber of Deputies of Chile) =

Electoral district of the Chamber of Deputies of Chile

- Distrito 24
- Electoral District for the Chamber of Deputies
- Location of District 24 within Chile
- Region: Los Ríos
- Population: 384,837 (2017)
- Electorate: 353,056 (2021)
- Area: 18,324 km^{2} (2020)

Current Electoral District
- Created: 2017
- Seats: 5 (2017–present)
- Deputies: List: Bernardo Berger (Ind); Ana María Bravo (PS); Marcos Ilabaca (PS); Gastón von Mühlenbrock (UDI); Patricio Rosas (FA)

District 24 (Spanish: Distrito 24) is one of the 28 multi-member electoral districts of the Chamber of Deputies, the lower house of the National Congress, the national legislature of Chile. The district was created by the 2015 electoral reform and came into being at the following general election in 2017. It is conterminous with the region of Los Ríos. The district currently elects five of the 155 members of the Chamber of Deputies using the open party-list proportional representation electoral system. At the 2021 general election the district had 353,056 registered electors.

== Electoral system ==
District 24 currently elects five of the 155 members of the Chamber of Deputies using the open party-list proportional representation electoral system. Parties may form electoral pacts with each other to pool their votes and increase their chances of winning seats. However, the number of candidates nominated by an electoral pact may not exceed the maximum number of candidates that a single party may nominate. Seats are allocated using the D'Hondt method.

== Election results ==
=== Summary ===
Election	Apruebo Dignidad AD / FA			Dignidad Ahora DA			New Social Pact NPS / NM			Democratic Convergence CD			Chile Vamos Podemos / Vamos			Party of the People PDG			Christian Social Front FSC		
Election	Votes	%	Seats	Votes	%	Seats	Votes	%	Seats	Votes	%	Seats	Votes	%	Seats	Votes	%	Seats	Votes	%	Seats
2021	25,764	17.90%	1	3,360	2.33%	0	47,723	33.15%	2				37,496	26.05%	2	11,743	8.16%	0	17,877	12.42%	0
2017	17,642	12.66%	0				45,271	32.48%	2	18,068	12.96%	1	50,975	36.57%	2						

=== Detailed ===
==== 2021 ====
Results of the 2021 general election held on 21 November 2021:

Party		Pact	Party															Pact		
Party		Pact	Votes per commune												Total votes	%	Seats	Votes	%	Seats
Party		Pact	Corral	Fut- rono	La Unión	Lago Ranco	Lanco	Los Lagos	Máfil	Mari- quina	Pail- laco	Pangui- pulli	Río Bueno	Val- divia	Total votes	%	Seats	Votes	%	Seats
Socialist Party of Chile	PS	New Social Pact	707	870	4,028	624	1,238	1,731	802	1,524	1,859	1,509	2,078	20,471	37,441	26.01%	2	47,723	33.15%	2
Christian Democratic Party	PDC	New Social Pact	92	155	247	127	142	185	269	276	218	302	378	3,119	5,510	3.83%	0	47,723	33.15%	2
Party for Democracy	PPD	New Social Pact	73	124	138	57	69	111	64	241	179	191	181	3,344	4,772	3.31%	0	47,723	33.15%	2
Independent Democratic Union	UDI	Chile Podemos +	64	1,515	2,621	1,039	317	1,179	164	265	1,433	2,273	2,767	2,504	16,141	11.21%	1	37,496	26.05%	2
National Renewal	RN	Chile Podemos +	144	448	2,263	246	658	471	290	719	622	556	849	7,276	14,542	10.10%	1	37,496	26.05%	2
Democratic Independent Regionalist Party	PRI	Chile Podemos +	154	232	585	142	332	281	189	590	436	539	450	2,883	6,813	4.73%	0	37,496	26.05%	2
Social Convergence	CS	Apruebo Dignidad	151	398	1,043	255	301	324	170	411	493	730	1,351	5,026	10,653	7.40%	1	25,764	17.90%	1
Democratic Revolution	RD	Apruebo Dignidad	74	179	401	222	1,153	146	72	518	173	1,247	415	3,055	7,655	5.32%	0	25,764	17.90%	1
Communist Party of Chile	PC	Apruebo Dignidad	102	143	381	104	172	384	73	269	262	987	339	4,240	7,456	5.18%	0	25,764	17.90%	1
Republican Party	REP	Christian Social Front	191	750	1,254	438	684	854	456	807	859	1,628	1,425	8,531	17,877	12.42%	0	17,877	12.42%	0
Party of the People	PDG		156	541	1,118	288	532	643	306	842	620	1,170	1,064	4,463	11,743	8.16%	0	11,743	8.16%	0
Humanist Party	PH	Dignidad Ahora	53	144	339	105	159	335	90	177	174	317	306	1,161	3,360	2.33%	0	3,360	2.33%	0
Valid votes			1,961	5,499	14,418	3,647	5,757	6,644	2,945	6,639	7,328	11,449	11,603	66,073	143,963	100.00%	5	143,963	100.00%	5
Blank votes			210	788	1,064	578	703	751	320	862	816	1,546	1,236	2,589	11,463	7.07%				
Rejected votes – other			140	316	753	201	321	335	147	414	403	801	603	2,168	6,602	4.07%				
Total polled			2,311	6,603	16,235	4,426	6,781	7,730	3,412	7,915	8,547	13,796	13,442	70,830	162,028	45.89%				
Registered electors			5,546	14,801	35,752	9,616	16,367	19,109	7,191	19,123	19,298	35,619	30,798	139,836	353,056					
Turnout			41.67%	44.61%	45.41%	46.03%	41.43%	40.45%	47.45%	41.39%	44.29%	38.73%	43.65%	50.65%	45.89%					

The following candidates were elected: Bernardo Berger (RN), 11,195 votes; Ana María Bravo (PS), 1,855 votes; Marcos Ilabaca (PS), 35,586 votes; Gastón von Mühlenbrock (UDI), 13,244 votes; and Patricio Rosas (CS), 6,630 votes.

==== 2017 ====
Results of the 2017 general election held on 19 November 2017:

Party		Pact	Party															Pact		
Party		Pact	Votes per commune												Total votes	%	Seats	Votes	%	Seats
Party		Pact	Corral	Fut- rono	La Unión	Lago Ranco	Lanco	Los Lagos	Máfil	Mari- quina	Pail- laco	Pangui- pulli	Río Bueno	Val- divia	Total votes	%	Seats	Votes	%	Seats
National Renewal	RN	Chile Vamos	284	683	1,492	290	1,857	1,098	758	1,601	2,697	1,097	1,077	16,207	29,141	20.91%	1	50,975	36.57%	2
Independent Democratic Union	UDI	Chile Vamos	49	1,361	3,627	1,109	255	889	152	180	735	1,667	3,508	3,081	16,613	11.92%	1	50,975	36.57%	2
Independent Regionalist Party	PRI	Chile Vamos	74	178	479	209	328	313	116	448	217	937	423	1,499	5,221	3.75%	0	50,975	36.57%	2
Socialist Party of Chile	PS	Nueva Mayoría	557	798	1,651	499	1,390	1,357	617	1,150	1,662	1,525	2,364	15,540	29,110	20.89%	2	45,271	32.48%	2
Party for Democracy	PPD	Nueva Mayoría	29	933	4,583	620	200	1,433	78	220	877	2,324	1,971	942	14,210	10.20%	0	45,271	32.48%	2
Communist Party of Chile	PC	Nueva Mayoría	25	42	163	40	122	82	33	79	70	114	108	1,073	1,951	1.40%	0	45,271	32.48%	2
Christian Democratic Party	PDC	Democratic Convergence	874	535	775	304	882	730	478	1,681	542	1,585	1,103	8,579	18,068	12.96%	1	18,068	12.96%	1
Democratic Revolution	RD	Broad Front	112	208	755	126	212	263	104	368	329	379	334	7,911	11,101	7.96%	0	17,642	12.66%	0
Green Ecologist Party	PEV	Broad Front	156	84	195	45	143	116	60	161	114	239	165	1,829	3,307	2.37%	0	17,642	12.66%	0
Humanist Party	PH	Broad Front	35	99	178	49	120	146	70	170	117	224	142	1,884	3,234	2.32%	0	17,642	12.66%	0
Citizens	CIU	Sumemos	40	125	249	74	206	196	126	199	151	459	234	1,309	3,368	2.42%	0	3,782	2.71%	0
Todos	TODOS	Sumemos	7	23	48	18	25	22	12	36	15	47	39	122	414	0.30%	0	3,782	2.71%	0
Progressive Party	PRO	All Over Chile	48	177	303	130	274	279	97	276	218	452	296	1,090	3,640	2.61%	0	3,640	2.61%	0
Valid votes			2,290	5,246	14,498	3,513	6,014	6,924	2,701	6,569	7,744	11,049	11,764	61,066	139,378	100.00%	5	139,378	100.00%	5
Blank votes			166	484	917	383	865	768	248	890	568	1,440	930	2,132	9,791	6.30%				
Rejected votes – other			117	268	637	171	391	369	162	419	307	726	570	2,046	6,183	3.98%				
Total polled			2,573	5,998	16,052	4,067	7,270	8,061	3,111	7,878	8,619	13,215	13,264	65,244	155,352	46.10%				
Registered electors			5,397	13,949	35,313	8,982	15,702	18,267	6,854	17,904	18,706	33,374	30,164	132,345	336,957					
Turnout			47.67%	43.00%	45.46%	45.28%	46.30%	44.13%	45.39%	44.00%	46.08%	39.60%	43.97%	49.30%	46.10%					

The following candidates were elected: Bernardo Berger (RN), 24,070 votes; Iván Flores (PDC), 13,242 votes; Marcos Ilabaca (PS), 15,739 votes; Gastón von Mühlenbrock (UDI), 12,542 votes; and Patricio Rosas (PS), 13,371 votes.
