= Mulpún =

Coal mine and locality in Chile

Coordinates: 39.754402°S 72.949087°W

Mulpún is a coal mine and locality in Los Ríos Region, Chile. Mulpún lies in the commune of Máfil a few kilometers to the west of the Chile Route 5 and north of the Calle-Calle and San Pedro River.

== History ==
The mine was exploited during parts of the 20th century when its coal powered the electric grid of the city of Valdivia. The mine has been owned by Compañía Carbonífera San Pedro de Catamutún since 1987. In 1992 and 1993 a gravimetric exploration campaign was conducted. The mine was planned to re-open in 1997. As the Catamutún mines closed in the late 1990s some miners were transferred to Mulpún, but mining in Mulpún ended in 2001 after an explosion accident.

An underground coal gasification project in the closed Mulpún mine was made public in 2009 but was put on hold in 2013. The project was a joint-venture between Antofagasta Minerals and Carbon Energy until 2013.

== Geology ==
At Mulpún there is one sub-horizontal coal layer whose thickness vary from 9 to 11 m. The coal is sub-bituminous type. Geologically the coal layers of Mulpún are belong to the so-called Mulpún Beds, a unit similar to the Pupunahue Beds that extends across large of the sub-surface of Los Ríos Region and whose coal has also been mined at Catamutún and Pupunahue. The coal layers are of Oligo-Miocene age (Note: Fossil foraminifer studies have however cast doubts on the exact age of coals across southern Chile, being a possibility that many coals are of Eocene age and not of Oligo-Miocene age.) and lie near the base of Pupunahue Beds. Below these lies the basement which is made up by the Bahía Mansa Metamorphic Complex. The Mulpún Bedsare overlaid across an angular uncorformity by Quaternary deposits. The coals of Mulpún and the whole Mulpún Beds lie in Mulpún Basin, a sub-basin of the larger Pupunahue-Mulpún Neogene Carboniferous Basin.

The sedimentary strata have been interpreted to reflect the former existence of four distinct environments:

- A fluvial estuary with sand bars and peat accumulations
- A slightly saline swamp with peat accumulations
- A tidal flat
- A continental shelf 500 or more meters below sea level
