= Osorno–Llanquihue Basin =

Sedimentary basin in Chile

- Cuenca de Osorno-Llanquihue
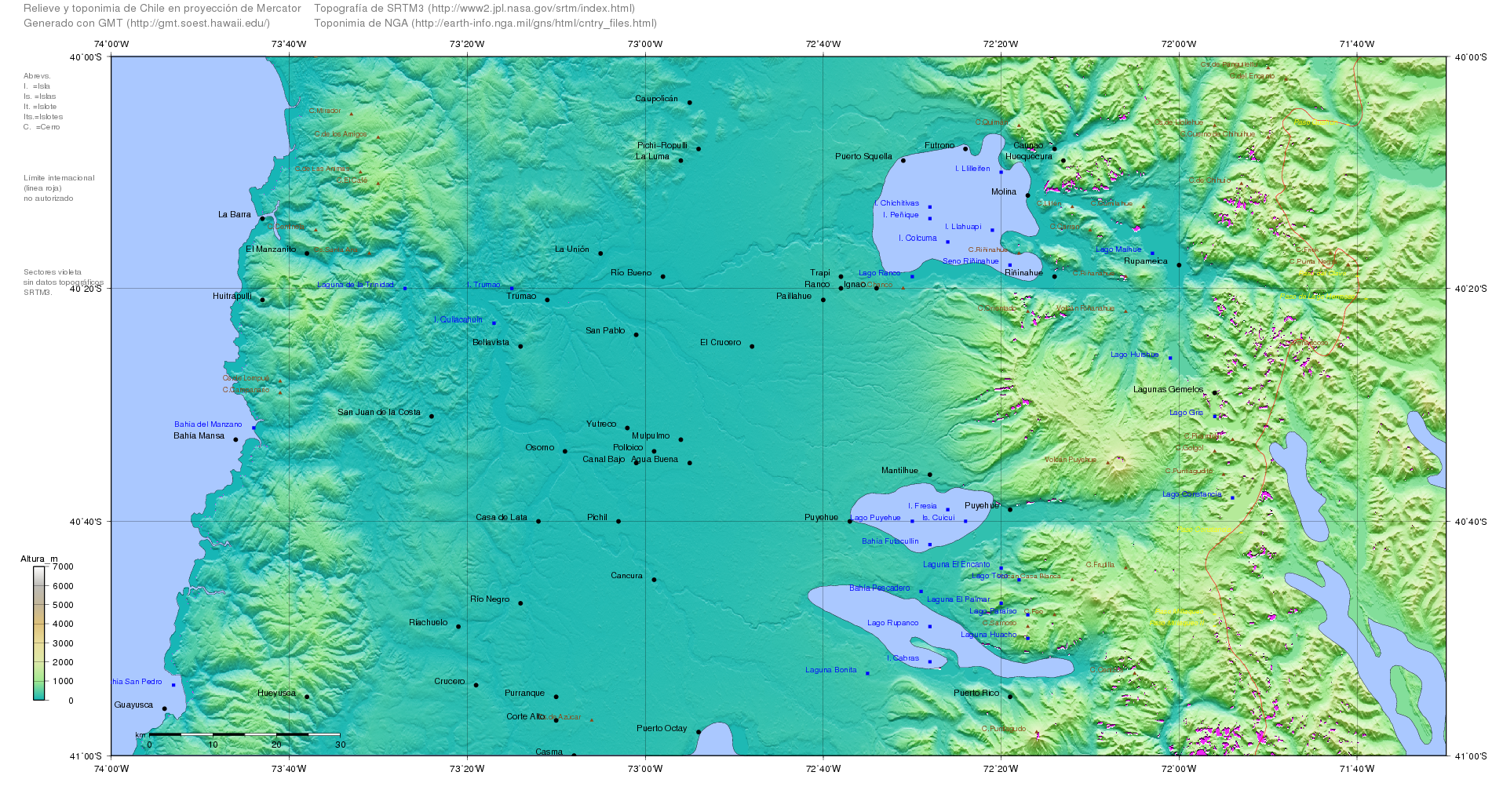
- SRTM map of the topography of the northern part of Osorno–Llanquihue Basin. The basin does largely correspond with the topographic low of the Chilean Central Valley.

- Location within Chile
- Coordinates: 40.712124°S 73.109218°W
- Etymology: Osorno and Llanquihue Lake
- Location: Southwestern South America
- Country: Chile
- States: Los Ríos Region; Los Lagos Region

Characteristics
- On/Offshore: Southern tip is offshore
- Boundaries: Chilean Coast Range (W); Andes (E)

Hydrology
- Sea: Eastern Pacific Ocean
- Rivers: Bueno, Negro, Pilmaiquén, Rahue, Damas
- Lakes: Llanquihue, Laguna Las Ortigas and the westernmost portions of Rupanco, Puyehue and Ranco

Geology
- Basin type: Forearc basin
- Orogeny: Andean
- Age: Oligocene-Pleistocene
- Field: Chilean coal

The Osorno–Llanquihue Basin (Spanish: Cuenca Osorno-Llanquihue) is a sedimentary basin located in south-central Chile in the forearc region of the Andes. From north to south the basin spans and area from Catamutún to Reloncaví Sound (40–42° S). The deepest part of the basin lie to the east. The lower levels of the basin are occupied by coal-bearing Cheuquemó Formation among other units while the Miocene-aged marine Santo Domingo Formation makes up much of the upper stratigraphy. The uppermost levels are made of sediments of Quaternary age of glacial, glaci-fluvial, glaci-lacustrine and volcanic character. The thickness of Quaternary sediments is greater to the south reaching almost 1,300 m (4,300 ft) in Puerto Montt. Sediments in the western part of the basin are roughly estimated to have reached 70 °C (158 °F) during burial and diagenesis.
