= Caleta Godoy Formation =

Geological formation in Chile

- Stratigraphic range: Pliocene
- Type: Geological formation
- Underlies: Holocene sediments, including dunes
- Overlies: Santo Domingo Formation; Bahía Mansa Metamorphic Complex

Lithology
- Primary: Sandstone, conglomerate, sandy tuff, coal

Location
- Coordinates: 41.8°S 73.5°W
- Region: Los Ríos & Los Lagos Regions
- Country: Chile
- Extent: Chacao Channel

Type section
- Named for: Caleta Godoy
- Caleta Godoy Formation (Chile)

Caleta Godoy Formation (Spanish: Formación Caleta Godoy) is a geological formation whose main outcrops lie around Chacao Channel in southern Chile. The formation overlies Bahía Mansa Metamorphic Complex and Santo Domingo Formation.

== Description ==
Caleta Godoy's strata are always found horizontally even in places where the underlying Santo Domingo Formation have its strata tilted 90 degrees (angular unconformity). The formation contains mollusc fossils and ichnofossils of Ophiomorpha and Planolites can be observed. Caleta Godoy Formation was deposited in a shallow marine environment during a small marine transgression different from that associated with Santo Domingo Formation. The formation is analogous to Licancheu and Tubul Formation found further north.
