= Máfil =

- Commune
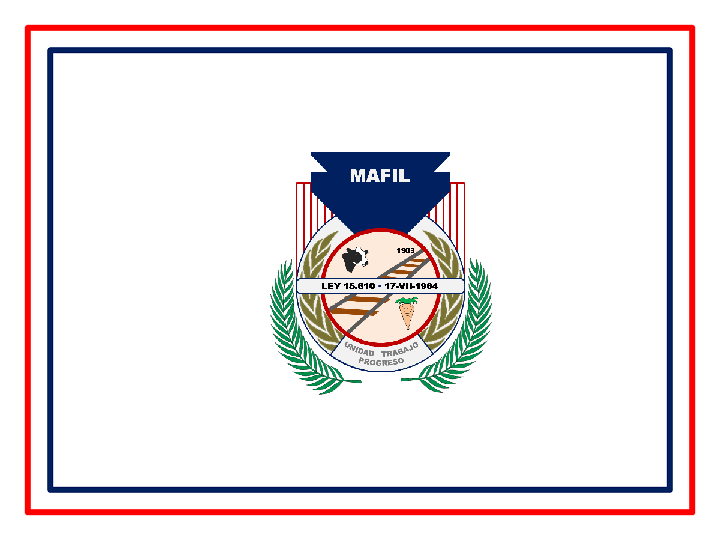
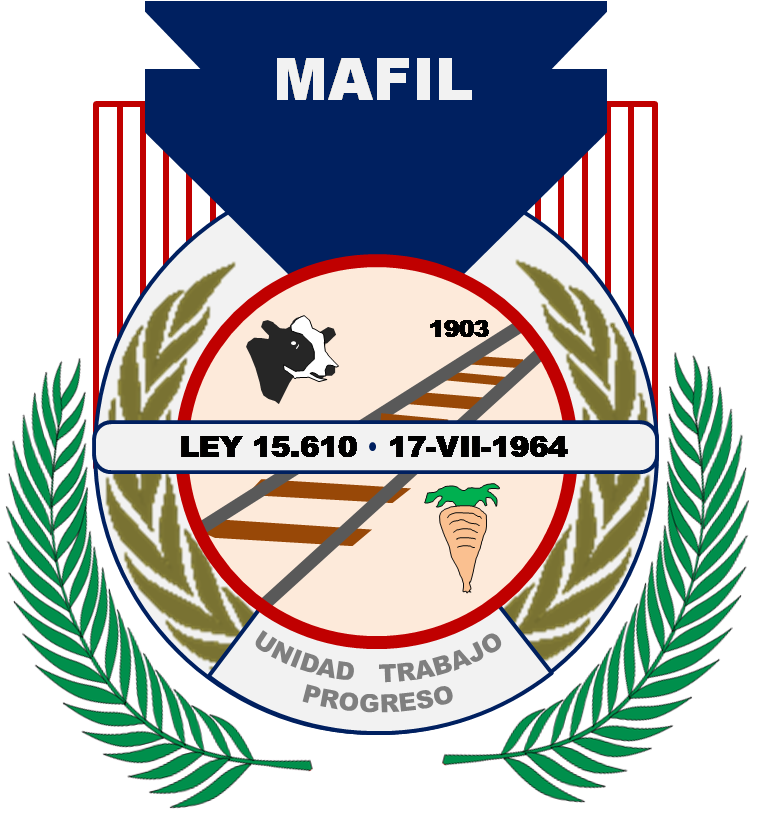
- Flag Coat of arms Location of the Commune of Máfil Location in Chile
- Coordinates: 39°39′S 72°57′W
- Country: Chile
- Region: Los Rios
- Province: Valdivia
- Founded: 17 July 1964

Government
  - Type: Municipality
  - Alcalde: Andrés Lara Martínez

Area
  - Total: 582.7 km^{2} (225.0 sq mi)
- Elevation: 14 m (46 ft)

Population (2012 Census)
  - Total: 7,212
  - Density: 12.38/km^{2} (32.06/sq mi)
  - Urban: 4,250
  - Rural: 3,417

Sex
  - Men: 3,773
  - Women: 3,440
- Time zone: UTC-4 (CLT)
  - Summer (DST): UTC-3 (CLST)
- Area code: 56 + 63
- Website: Municipality of Máfil

Máfil (Mapudungun for embraced between rivers) is a city and commune of the Valdivia Province, Los Ríos Region in southern Chile, about 30 km northeast of Valdivia.

The commune is the site of a dairy industry and the town of Máfil a local centre of commerce and services such as basic education and a community health center. Relative to other communes of Los Ríos Region Máfil stands out for its central position and good road connections to the surrounding communes.

The climate of Máfil is temperate oceanic with at least four dry months. A total of 803 mm of precipitation occurs in winter and 189 mm in summer according to averages calculated in 1989. The natural vegetation of Máfil is Valdivian temperate forests.

The main natural resources of Máfil are the forest and their timber, the gold of Madre de Dios and coal in Pupunahue and Millahuillín. The commune has soils of volcanic origin including trumaos.

== History ==
The lands of Máfil were formerly known as Pidey and were chiefly populated by Huilliches. In the second half of the 19th century, German farmers settled in Máfil. The change in name to Máfil is attributed to a land survey map published in 1910 where it appeared. In 1953 a large coal gasification plant began to be developed in Pupunahue by CORFO. The plant was to gasify coal using German technology from World War II to then create in the long term a larger plant in Magallanes Region where coal deposits were larger. The building of the gasification plant was halted during the government of Jorge Alessandri and its infrastructure and materials were subsequently either sold, abandoned or stolen.

The commune was created in 1964 during the government of Jorge Alessandri.

== Demographics ==
Historical population
Year	Pop.	±% p.a.
1970	7,230	—
1982	7,067	−0.19%
1992	7,176	+0.15%
2002	7,213	+0.05%
2017	7,095	−0.11%
2024	8,074	+1.86%
Source: "Censo de Población y Vivienda". National Statistics Institute.

According to the 2002 census of the National Statistics Institute, Máfil spans an area of 582.7 km^{2} (225 sq mi) and has 7,213 inhabitants (3,773 men and 3,440 women). Of these, 3,796 (52.6%) lived in urban areas and 3,417 (47.4%) in rural areas. The population fell by 7% (547 persons) between the 1992 and 2002 censuses. The town of Máfil had 5,237 inhabitants according to the 2017 census.

== Administration ==
As a commune, Máfil is a third-level administrative division of Chile administered by a municipal council, headed by an alcalde who is directly elected every four years. the alcalde is Claudio Sepúlveda Miranda r.

Within the electoral divisions of Chile, Máfil is represented in the Chamber of Deputies by Marcos Ilabaca (PS), Gastón von Mühlenbrock (UDI), Bernardo Berger (ind-RN), Patricio Rosas (ind-CS) and Ana María Bravo (PS) as part of the 24th electoral district (Los Ríos Region). The commune is represented in the Senate during the 2022–2030 period by Alfonso de Urresti (PS), Iván Flores (PDC) and María José Gatica (RN) as part of the 12th senatorial constituency (Los Ríos Region).
