= BMMC =

BMMC may refer to:

- Bahía Mansa Metamorphic Complex, a group of metamorphic geologic formations in Southern Chile
- Brigada Mass Media Corporation, a newspaper company & media network in the Philippines
- Brookhaven Memorial Medical Center, a former name of Long Island Community Hospital in East Patchogue, New York
