= Patricio Rosas =

Chilean politician (born 1968)

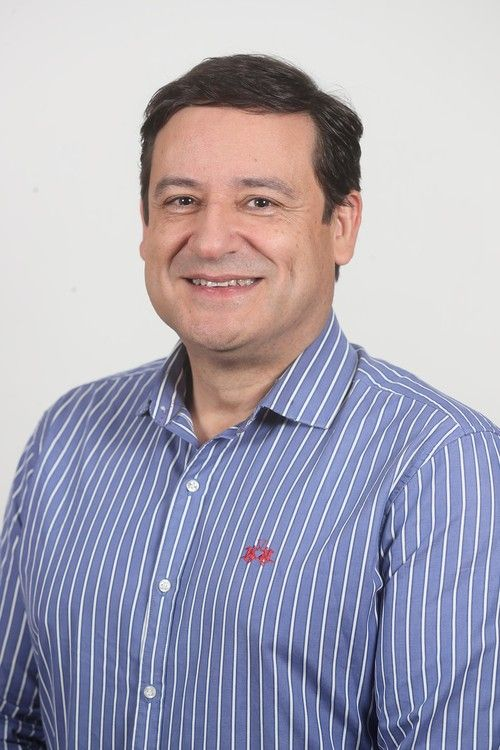

Member of the Chamber of Deputies
- In office 11 March 2018 – 11 March 2026
- Preceded by: Creation of the District
- Constituency: District 24

Personal details
- Born: 6 May 1968 (age 58) Recoleta, Santiago, Chile
- Party: Socialist Party (1988–2019); Unir Movement (2020–2023); Comunes (2023–present)
- Children: Two
- Parent(s): Dalmiro Rosas; Marianela Barrientos
- Education: Austral University of Chile
- Occupation: Politician
- Profession: Physician

Patricio Eduardo Rosas Barrientos (born May 6, 1968) is a Chilean surgeon and politician. Since March 2018, he has served as deputy for district No. 24, corresponding to the Los Ríos Region.

== Biography ==
He was born on May 6, 1968, in Osorno. He is the son of Dalmiro Rosas Schaaf and Marianela Isabel Barrientos Villanueva. He is divorced and the father of two children. He is a Surgeon from the Austral University of Chile. Subsequently, he obtained a master's degree in Business Administration and a Diploma in Social Management, Community Management, and Family and Community Health and is currently pursuing a master's degree in economics. In March 2014, he assumed the direction of the Valdivia Health Service, as alternate director, after the resignation of Marianela Caro. In January of the following year, he was appointed director of the Valdivia Health Service, a position he held until October 2017.

== Political career ==
In the 2017 parliamentary elections, he was elected deputy for the Socialist Party of Chile (PS) representing the District 24 (Corral, Futrono, La Unión, Lago Ranco, Lanco, Los Lagos, Máfil, Mariquina, Paillaco, Panguipulli, Río Bueno, Valdivia ), XIV Region of Los Ríos, period 2018–2022. He obtained 13,299 votes corresponding to 9.54% of the total votes validly cast.

In this legislative period he joined the permanent Health commissions; and Sciences and Technology. He also participated in the Special Investigative Commission of possible irregularities in the artificial reduction of waiting lists through the elimination of patients from the National Repository of Waiting Lists, manipulation of statistics and omission of registration.

In June 2019, he decided to present his resignation from the PS due to conflicts with deputy Marcos Ilabaca and senator Alfonso de Urresti. In March 2020 he joined the Unir Movement along with former PS Marcelo Díaz. He remained in said community – belonging to the Frente Amplio since June 2020 – until December 10, 2020, when he announced his resignation. Later he rejoined the community.

In the 2021 parliamentary elections he was elected as an independent deputy in a Social Convergence quota. Currently, he is part of the permanent Health commissions; and Economy, Development; Micro, Small and Medium Enterprises; Consumer Protection and Tourism.

On August 5, 2023, the Unir Movement closed its last congress approving the decision to unify with Comunes, in a process of strengthening the Frente Amplio into a single party.

== Controversies ==
Irregular diversion of public funds

On March 23, 2019, the Comptroller General of the Republic determined that Patricio Rosas, along with the mayor of Paillaco Ramona Reyes, and two other officials, had irregularly diverted more than $70 million pesos intended for primary health, which were used to finance a national union event called ''IX National Congress of the National Confederation of Municipal Health Officials'' that took place in 2015, in the city of Valdivia. That event was also held through a direct deal with the city's Hotel Dreams. At that time, Rosas served as director of the Health Service of the Los Ríos Region.

This complaint of irregular deviations was made by deputy Bernardo Berger (who represents the same district as Rosas), where together with other figures from Chile Vamos in the region they seek the dismissal of Mayor Reyes and more legal actions against deputy Rosas. For now, Rosas has been sanctioned with 5% of his monthly parliamentary remuneration, plus other administrative sanctions. Currently, the investigation is ongoing.
