= Agüi Fort =

Historic fort in Chile

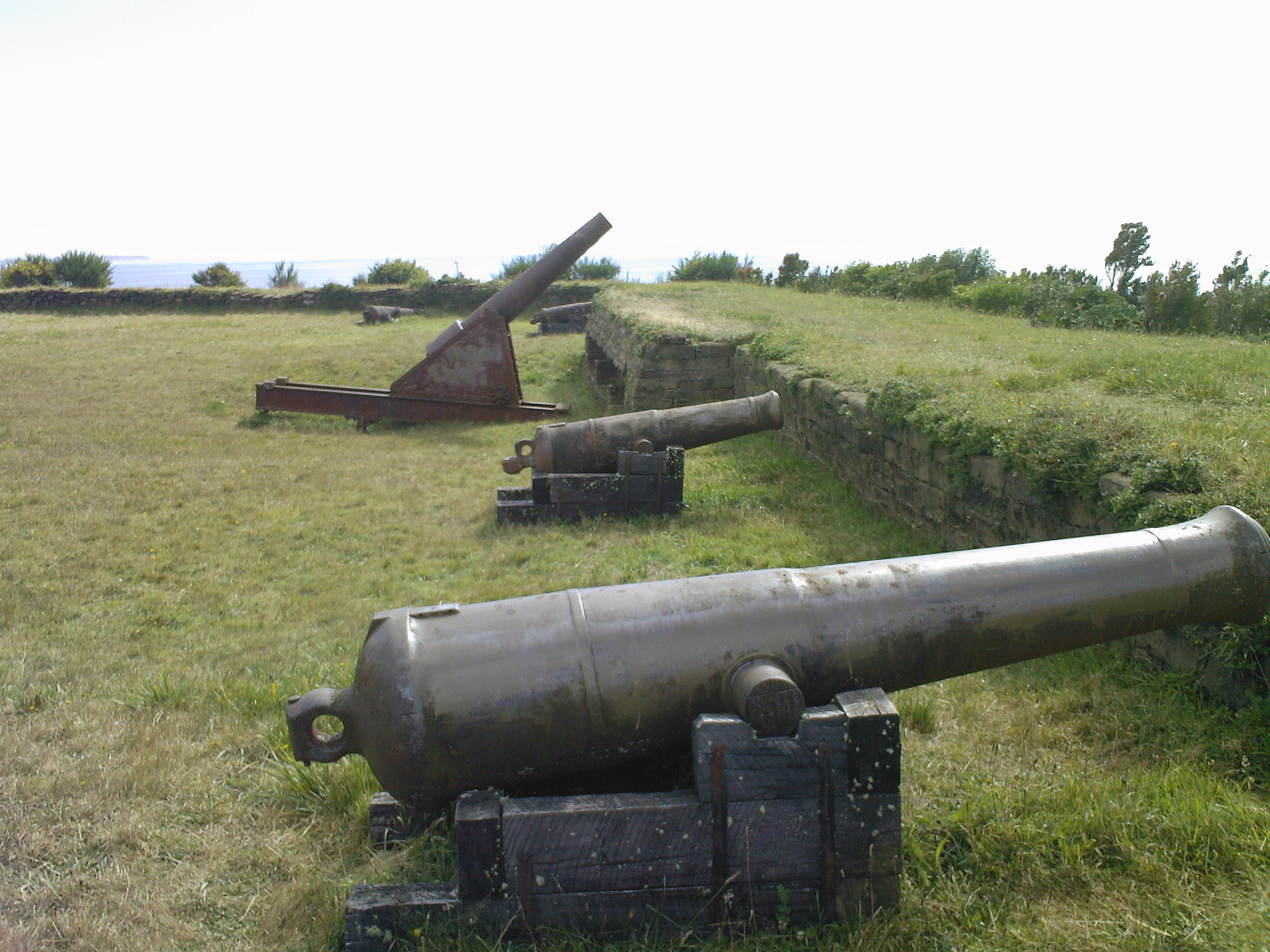
- Alternative names: Ahui Fort

General information
- Location: Chile
- Coordinates: 41.829477°S 73.855132°W
- Construction started: 1776
- Completed: 1779

Agüi Fort (Spanish: Fuerte Agüi), also written as Agui or Ahui, and otherwise known as San Miguel de Agüi Castle), is a fortification located on the Lacuy peninsula, Chile.

== History ==
The function of this fort was the defense of the city of Ancud, in which it protected the southern coast of the Chacao Channel. The fort was built between 1776 and 1779, according to the plans of the engineer of Spanish descent Miguel de Zorrilla. The fort also served to protect the ships that traveled between the island of Chiloe and Continental Chile. In 1818, the walls of the fort were reinforced using cancagua stone. The fort was besieged by the Chilean army in 1820 and 1824, during the Chilean independence process. The fort was taken by the patriot forces led by Alexander Cochrane in the 1826 campaign. In 1826, ownership of the fort was transferred to the Chilean Navy. The fort's infrastructure was affected after the 1960 Valdivia earthquake. In 1911, the artist Courtois de Bonnencontre made several illustrations of the fort. In 1991, the fort was declared a national monument. In 2012, part of the fort was remodeled, this remodeling was financed by the Inter-American Development Bank and the Undersecretariat of Regional and Administrative Development. The main objective with the remodeling of the fort was for the conservation and recovery of the historical and cultural heritage, as well as to encourage tourism on the island of Chiloe. In 2016, the people responsible for the remodeling received the Ibero-American award for the restoration of the fort granted by the International Center for Heritage Conservation and the Central Society of Architects, the restoration of the fort is part of the "10th version of the Ibero-American Award for the Best Intervention in Works Involving Built Heritage".

== Structure ==
The fort has a dungeon, a powder magazine and an access built with cancagua stone extracted from a quarry near Ancud. The fort has 12 cannons. The fort also has 15 pieces of artwork and a walled circuit.
