= Temuco Formation =

Geologic formation in Chile

- Stratigraphic range: Eocene–Miocene
- Type: Geological formation
- Overlies: Bahía Mansa Metamorphic Complex
- Thickness: 1,400 m (4,600 ft)

Lithology
- Primary: Sandstone, siltstone, claystone, andesitic tuff
- Other: Coal, breccia, conglomerate

Location
- Region: Araucanía Region
- Country: Chile

Type section
- Named for: Temuco

Temuco Formation a sedimentary formation near the city of Temuco in southern Chile. The formation crops out in the western part of Labranza Basin at the foothills of the Chilean Coast Range. It overlies the Bahía Mansa Metamorphic Complex and underlies sediments of Holocene age. The formation is thought to represent ancient river systems of low and intermediated energy near an area of volcanism around cerro Ñielol.
