= Roberto Delmastro =

Chilean politician

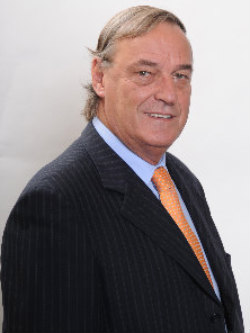

Member of the Chamber of Deputies
- In office 11 March 1998 – 11 March 2014
- Preceded by: Juan Enrique Taladriz
- Succeeded by: Bernardo Berger

Personal details
- Born: 17 October 1945
- Died: 26 December 2014 (aged 69)
- Party: National Renewal (RN)
- Education: Austral University of Chile
- Occupation: Politician
- Profession: Engineer

Roberto Delmastro Naso (October 17, 1945 – December 26, 2014) was a Chilean politician and engineer. He served as a member of the Chamber of Deputies of Chile for Valdivia from March 11, 1998, to March 11, 2014.

Delmastro died from lung cancer on December 26, 2014, at the age of 69.

== Early life and family ==
Delmastro was born on 17 October 1945 in Santiago. He married María Inés Anwandter Haverbeck and was the father of three children: Paola, Rodrigo, and Pía.

He died on 26 December 2014 in Valdivia.

== Professional career ==
He completed his primary and secondary education at Colegio El Patrocinio de San José in Valdivia. He then entered the Austral University of Chile in Valdivia, where he qualified as a forestry engineer. In 1972, he received a scholarship from the Ford Foundation to pursue a Master of Science in forestry with a minor in Genetics at the University of North Carolina, graduating in 1975. That same year, he served as a teaching assistant in Forest Genetics at the same university.

In 1969, he worked as a forestry engineer and assistant to the production manager at Maderas y Sintéticos de Valdivia. The following year, he joined the administration of Fábrica Laminadora de Maderas S.A., and in 1971 he served as legal representative of Praderas y Sintéticos and Laminadora de Maderas S.A.

Between 1972 and later from 1975 to 1981, he was professor of Genetics and Forest Improvement at the Institute of Silviculture and Reforestation of the Faculty of Forestry Engineering at the Austral University of Chile. Between 1976 and 1981, he was founder and director of the university's Genetic Improvement Agreement. In 1976, he became director of the Department of Silviculture, and the following year assumed as director of the School of Forestry Engineering.

In 1979, he was vice-dean of the Faculty of Forestry Engineering. The following year, until 1981, he served as dean of the same faculty, after which he became director of the Institute of Silviculture. In 1981, he served as consultant to the Food and Agriculture Organization of the United Nations (FAO), and from 1993 onward he was a member of the board of the Austral University of Chile.

Alongside his academic career, he continued practicing professionally. From 1981 to 1989, he served as manager of Empresa Forestal Pedro de Valdivia Ltda. and adviser to the university's Genetic Improvement Cooperative. In 1996, he assumed responsibility for Environmental Management at Empresas Arauco and Forestal Arauco S.A. That same year, until 1997, he served as director of Forestal Valdivia and Bioforest S.A.

== Political career ==
In July 2006, he registered as a member of National Renewal (RN).

Following the December 2009 parliamentary elections, he led the second-round presidential campaign of Sebastián Piñera in District No. 53 for the January 2010 runoff.

After the appointment of RN president Carlos Larraín as senator for the Los Ríos Region, replacing the newly appointed Minister of Defense Andrés Allamand, he resigned from his membership in National Renewal on 28 March 2011.
