= Estratos de Pupunahue =

Geologic formation in Chile

- Stratigraphic range: Eocene–Miocene
- Underlies: Santo Domingo Formation
- Overlies: Bahía Mansa Metamorphic Complex
- Thickness: up to 530 m (1,740 ft)

Lithology
- Primary: Conglomerate, sandstone, mudstone
- Other: Coal, volcanic ash

Location
- Region: Los Ríos Region; Los Lagos Region
- Country: Chile

Type section
- Named for: Pupunahue
- Named by: Henning Illies

Estratos de Pupunahue is the name given to the sedimentary strata of Oligocene-Miocene age that crop out in Pupunahue and Mulpún near Valdivia, Chile. Outside this locality Estratos de Pupunahue extends below the surface over a larger area. The thickness of the strata varies from a few meters to 530 meters. The strata were initially described by Henning Illies. The strata are made up of conglomerate, sandstone and mudstone (Chilean Spanish: fangolita). The clast of the conglomerates are made up of metamorphic rock and the disposition of the conglomerates varies from clast-supported to matrix-supported. The sandstone and mudstone contain layers of lignite coal that exceed 30 cm in thickness.

Coal layers found in the Estratos de Pupunahue have been exploited in the mines of Catamutún, Pupunahue and Mulpún ("Mulpun Beds").

The strata are very similar to the Cheuquemó Formation found further north, with the sole difference that the fossil assemblage in both seems to indicate different ages. While Cheuquemó Formation is possibly about 14 million years old (Miocene), Estratos de Pupunahue are 35–25 million years old.

== See also ==
- Coal mining in Chile
