= Santo Domingo Formation =

Miocene sedimentary formation in Southern Chile

- Stratigraphic range: Miocene
- Type: Geological formation
- Underlies: Pliocene and Quaternary sediments including Caleta Godoy Formation
- Overlies: Bahía Mansa Metamorphic Complex, Cretaceous granitoids, Cheuquemó Formation, Estratos de Pupunahue
- Thickness: Up to 110 m (360 ft) at surface 1,500 m (4,900 ft) in subsurface

Lithology
- Primary: Sandstone, siltstone, mudstone
- Other: Conglomerate

Location
- Coordinates: 40.0°S 73.0°W
- Region: Los Ríos & Los Lagos Regions
- Country: Chile
- Extent: Osorno–Llanquihue & Valdivia Basins

Type section
- Named for: Cuesta Santo Domingo
- Named by: Martínez Pardo & Pino
- Year defined: 1979
- Santo Domingo Formation (Chile) Location of type section in Chile

Santo Domingo Formation (Spanish: Formación Santo Domingo) is a mainly marine Miocene sedimentary formation located in south–central Chile. The formation was defined by R. Martínez Pardo and Mario Pino in 1979 and named after the roadcut locality they studied about 19 kilometres (12 mi) southeast of Valdivia. Sediments of the formation accumulated in Valdivia and Osorno–Llanquihue Basin.

The formations overlie a basement consisting of metamorphic and igneous rocks, the Bahía Mansa Metamorphic Complex and Cretaceous granitoids, respectively. In parts, it further overlies the coal–bearing Pupunahue–Catamutún Formation. The sedimentary facies of the Santo Domingo Formation are composed of sandstone, siltstone, and mudstone with smaller amounts of conglomerate. The formation underlies Pliocene and Quaternary sediments.

== Fossil content ==
Some of the trace fossils that can be found in the Santo Domingo Formation are Zoophycos isp., Chondrites isp., Phycoshiphon isp., Ophiomorpha isp. Thalassinoides isp., Asterosoma isp., and Terebellina isp.

The benthic foraminifera found in the Santo Domingo Formation are broadly similar to those found in other Chilean sedimentary formations of the Neogene, like the Navidad Formation of Central Chile, Ranquil Formation of Arauco Province, and Lacui Formation of Chiloé Island. The most common formaineral species of the Santo Domingo Formation are Hansenisca altiformis, Rectuvigerina transversa, and Sphaeroidina bulloides.

== See also ==
- Ancud Volcanic Complex
- Panguipulli Batholith
