= Pupunahue =

Coordinates: 39°48′S 72°54′W

Pupunahue is a coal mine and hamlet in Los Ríos Region near the towns of Máfil and Los Lagos. The coal beds exploited in Pupunahue belong to the Pupunahue Beds. Geologically the sedimentary rocks of the Pupunahue Beds containing coal lie in Pupunahue Basin, a sub-basin of the larger Pupunahue-Mulpún Neogene Carboniferous Basin. The coals of Pupunahue deposited during the Oligo-Miocene (Note: Fossil foraminifer studies have however cast doubts on the exact age of coals across southern Chile, being a possibility that many coals are of Eocene age and not of Oligo-Miocene age.'"`UNIQ--ref-00000000-QINU`"') in an environment with moderate marine influence and certainly less marine influence than for the nearby Catamutún coals. In 2016 it was announced that the closed Pupunahue mine would become a national heritage site.

== See also ==
- The Jackal of Pupunahue
- Coal mining in Chile
- History of mining in Chile
