= Estratos de San Pedro =

Geologic formation in Chile

- Stratigraphic range: Eocene–Miocene
- Underlies: Quaternary sediments
- Overlies: Trafún Metamorphic Complex
- Thickness: ca. 1,000 m (3,300 ft)

Lithology
- Primary: Conglomerate, sandstone, mudstone
- Other: Lignite

Location
- Region: Los Ríos Region
- Country: Chile

Type section
- Named for: San Pedro River
- Named by: Juan Brüggen

Estratos de San Pedro is the name given to the sedimentary strata of Paleogene age that crop out along San Pedro River, southern Chile. The strata were initially described by Juan Brüggen and later briefly investigated by Henning Illies who estimated their thickness at 1,000 metres (3,300 ft). The strata are made up of conglomerate, sandstone and mudstone (Chilean Spanish: fangolita). The clasts of the conglomerates are made up of metamorphic rock and the disposition of the conglomerates varies from clast-supported to matrix-supported. The sandstone and mudstone contains layers of lignite coal that exceed 30 centimetres (12 in) in thickness.
