= Malargüe Group =

Group of geologic formations in Argentina

- Stratigraphic range: Early Maastrichtian-Deseadan; ~79–30 Ma
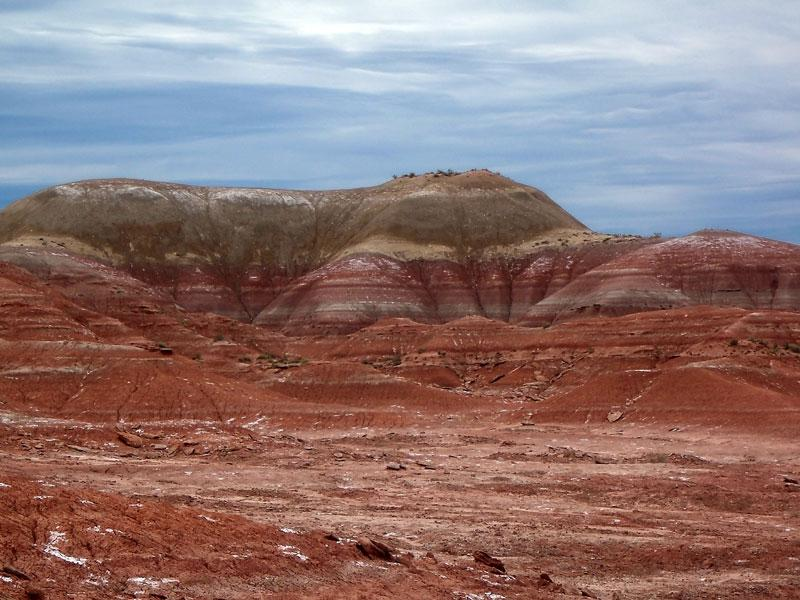
- Outcrop of the Allen Formation at Auca Mahuida
- Type: Group
- Sub-units: Agua de la Piedra Formation; Roca & Jagüel Formations; Loncoche & Allen Formations
- Overlies: Neuquén Group; Río Colorado Subgroup; Anacleto Formation

Lithology
- Primary: Mudstone, sandstone, conglomerate
- Other: Limestone, tuff, paleosol

Location
- Coordinates: 40.0°S 66.6°W
- Approximate paleocoordinates: 42.8°S 52.2°W
- Region: La Pampa, Río Negro, Neuquén & Mendoza Provinces
- Country: Argentina
- Extent: Neuquén Basin

Type section
- Named for: Malargüe
- Malargüe Group (Argentina)

The Malargüe Group is a group of geologic formations of the Neuquén Basin of the Mendoza, Neuquén, Río Negro and La Pampa Provinces in northern Patagonia, Argentina. The formations of the Malargüe Group range in age between the middle Campanian to Deseadan, an Oligocene age of the SALMA classification, straddling the Cretaceous–Paleogene boundary, about 79 million to 30 million years in age. The group overlies the older Neuquén Group, separated by an unconformity dated to 79 Ma. The rocks of the Malargüe Group comprise both marine and continental deposits which are over 400 m (1312 ft) thick in total.

== Subdivision ==
The Malargüe Group is subdivided into:

- Agua de la Piedra Formation (Deseadan) - white-grayish tuffs and tobaceous paleosols
- Roca Formation (Maastrichtian to Danian) - coastal mudstones and sandstones
- Jagüel Formation (middle Maastrichtian to Danian) - shallow marine mudstones
- Loncoche Formation (late Campanian to early Maastrichtian) - terrestrial conglomerates and sandstones, delta plain sandstones and limestones
- Allen Formation (middle Campanian to early Maastrichtian) - eolian sandstones and fluvio-lacustrine mudstones and limestones

== Fossil content ==
Fossils of dinosaurs, plesiosaurs, turtles (Euclastes, Mendozachelys wichmanni), Paleoanculosa sp., fish, birds (cf. Andrewsornis sp.) and mammals have been recovered from the strata that make up the Malargüe Group.

Mammals of the Agua de la Piedra Formation

Archaeohyrax suniensis, Argyrohyrax proavus, Asmodeus petrasnerus, Fieratherium sorex, Gualta cuyana, Hegetotheriopsis sulcatus, Mendozahippus fierensis, Meteutatus aff. lagenaformis, Proborhyaena gigantea, Prohegetotherium malalhuense, P. schiaffinoi, P. cf. sculptum, Propachyrucos cf. smithwoodwardi, ?Prozaedyus aff. impressus, Pyrotherium romeroi, Stenotatus aff. ornatus, Trachytherus cf. spegazzinianus, cf. Archaeotypotherium sp., Pharsophorus sp., Proadinotherium sp., Progaleopithecus sp., cf. Prosotherium sp., Acaremyidae indet., Glyptodontidae indet., Interatheriidae indet., Litopterna indet., ?Megalonychidae indet., Notohippidae indet., Toxodontidae indet.

== See also ==
- List of fossil sites
- Santa Lucía Formation, Maastrichtian to Danian (Tiupampan) fossiliferous formation of the Potosí Basin, Bolivia
- Yacoraite Formation, Maastrichtian to Danian fossiliferous formation of the Salta Basin
- López de Bertodano Formation, Maastrichtian to Danian fossiliferous formation of northern Antarctica
