= Lias Formation =

Geological formation of Jurassic age in France

- Stratigraphic range: Jurassic
- Type: Formation

Location
- Country: France

The Lias Formation is a geologic formation in France. It preserves fossils dating back to the Jurassic period.

== See also ==
- List of fossiliferous stratigraphic units in France
