= Ancud Volcanic Complex =

Volcanic complex in Chile

- Stratigraphic range: Oligocene–Miocene
- Type: Geological complex
- Sub-units: Heuihuen, Teguaco, Cocotue
- Underlies: Quaternary and Neogene deposits including Lacui Formation
- Overlies: Caleta Chonos Formation

Lithology
- Primary: Basaltic andesite
- Other: Dacite

Location
- Coordinates: 41.9°S 73.8°W
- Region: Los Lagos Region
- Country: Chile
- Extent: Chiloé Archipelago

Type section
- Named for: Ancud
- Ancud Volcanic Complex (Chile)

Ancud Volcanic Complex (Spanish: Complejo Volcánico de Ancud) is a volcanic complex of Oligocene and Miocene age located around Ancud with exposures in Chiloé Island, the Chilean mainland and smaller islets. Three subunits are recognized in the complex: Hueihuen, Teguaco and Cocotue. The complex is part of the mid-Tertiary coastal magmatic belt in south-central Chile.

== See also ==
- Parga Formation
- Santo Domingo Formation
