= El Chiflón del Diablo =

Chiflón del Diablo
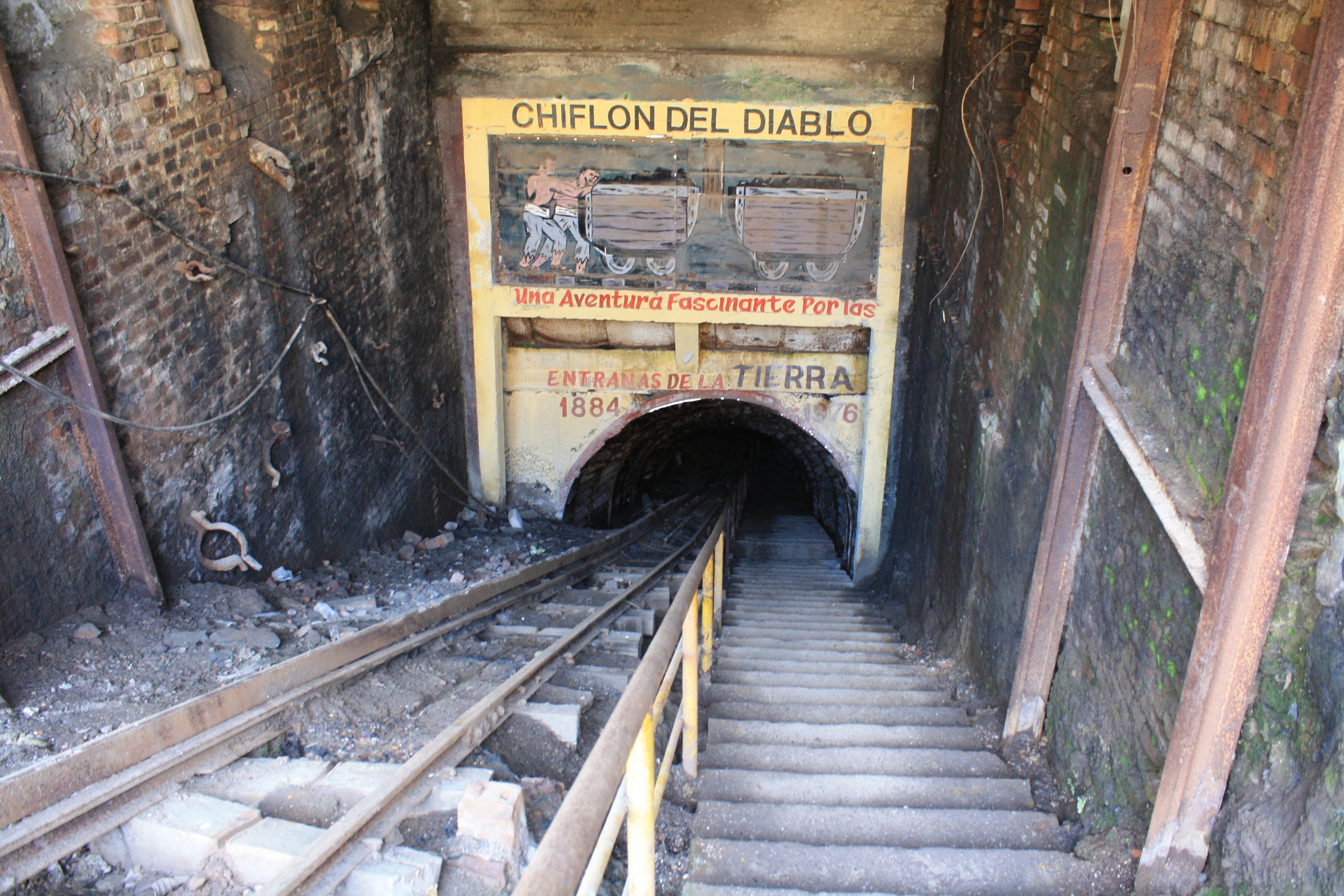
- Entrance to the mine.
- Interactive map of Chiflón del Diablo
- Location: Lota, Concepción Province, Chile
- Coordinates: 37°04′33″S 73°09′38″W
- Type: Coal Mine Historical Monument

El Chiflón del Diablo or The Devil's Blast is one of the oldest Chilean coal mines in the commune of Lota, Concepción Province, Biobío Region.

== History ==
The mine operated between 1884 and 1970, serving as an important economic center for mining companies in the 19th and 20th centuries.

The heavily criticized working conditions of the mine were immortalized in the 1904 book Sub Terra by Chilean author Baldomero Lillo, and in 2003 was represented in a major motion picture of the same name.

On October 6, 2009, the mine was declared a National Monument of Chile under the category of historical monument. Currently, El Chiflón del Diablo serves as tourist attraction.

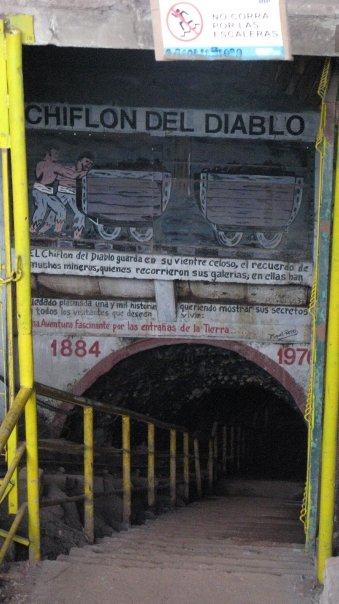
Stairway down into El Chiflón del Diablo.

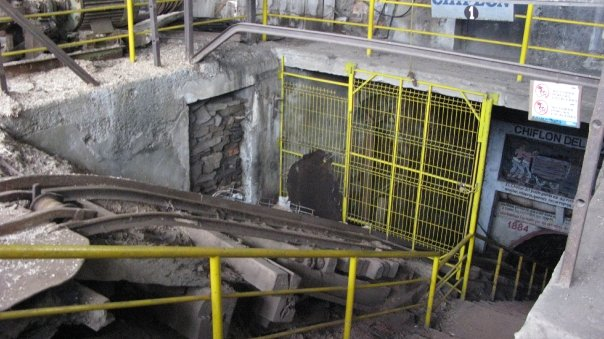
Top of El Chiflón del Diablo.

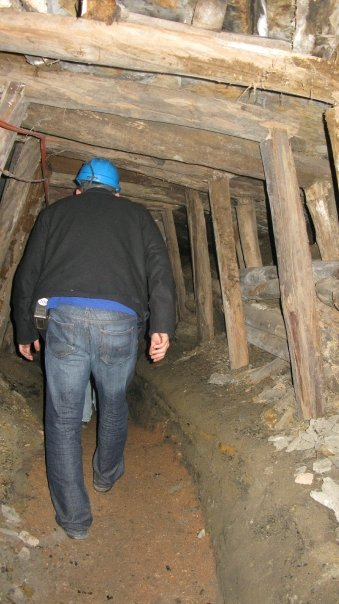
Walking through El Chiflón del Diablo.
