= Adaffa Formation =

Geological formation in Saudi Arabia

- Stratigraphic range: Campanian; ~72 Ma
- Type: Geological formation
- Unit of: Suqah Group
- Underlies: Unconformity with Lower Miocene Al Wajh Formation
- Overlies: Proterozoic granite basement
- Thickness: Up to 200 m (660 ft)

Lithology
- Primary: Sandstone, siltstone, marl
- Other: Conglomerate

Location
- Location: Midyan Peninsula, Tabuk Region
- Coordinates: 27.3°N 35.7°E
- Approximate paleocoordinates: 9.7°N 29.2°E
- Region: Arabian Peninsula
- Country: Saudi Arabia
- Adaffa Formation (Saudi Arabia)

The Adaffa Formation is a geological formation in Saudi Arabia, and the lowermost unit of the Suqah Group. It dates back to the Campanian of the Late Cretaceous. The lithology consists of sandstone, siltstone and marl, with a basal granitic conglomerate with phosphatic nodules. Also present are ferricrete horizons. It was deposited in marginal marine conditions close to land. Fish, marine reptile and dinosaur remains have been recovered from the formation.

== Vertebrate paleofauna ==
=== Fish ===
Fish of the Adaffa Formation
Genus	Species	Location	Stratigraphic position	Abundance	Notes	Images
Ceratodus	Indeterminate			Toothplates	Lungfish	
cf. Enchodus	Indeterminate			Teeth		
cf. Protosphyraena	Indeterminate			Teeth	Pachycormid	
?Anacoracidae	Indeterminate			Vertebrae		
Lepisosteidae	Indeterminate			Vertebral centra		
Pycnodontiformes	Indeterminate			Teeth		

=== Crocodyliformes ===
Crocodyliformes of the Adaffa Formation
Genus	Species	Location	Stratigraphic position	Abundance	Notes	Images
Dyrosauridae	Indeterminate			Two vertebrae		
Crocodyliformes	Indeterminate			Cranial fragment		

=== Plesiosaurians ===
Plesiosaurians of the Adaffa Formation
Genus	Species	Location	Stratigraphic position	Abundance	Notes	Images
Elasmosauridae	Indeterminate			Rostral portion of a skull		

=== Squamates ===
Squamates of the Adaffa Formation
Genus	Species	Location	Stratigraphic position	Abundance	Notes	Images
Prognathodon	Indeterminate			Teeth	Mosasaur	
cf. Pachyvaranus	Indeterminate			Vertebrae	Aquatic varanoid	
Mosasauridae				Pygal vertebra		
Plioplatecarpinae	Indeterminate			Dorsal vertebra		

=== Turtles ===
Turtles of the Adaffa Formation
Genus	Species	Location	Stratigraphic position	Abundance	Notes	Images
Bothremydidae	Indeterminate			Shell fragments and a femur		

=== Non-avian Dinosaurs ===
Dinosaurs of the Adaffa Formation
Genus	Species	Location	Stratigraphic position	Abundance	Notes	Images
Abelisauridae	Indeterminate			Two teeth		
Titanosauria	Indeterminate			Seven caudal vertebrae, seemingly from the same individual		
