= Iván Flores =

Chilean politician (born 1955)

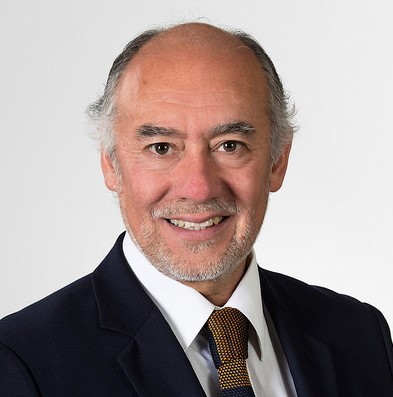

Member of the Senate
- In office 11 March 2022 – 11 March 2030
- Preceded by: Creation of the circumscription
- Constituency: Los Ríos Region (12th Circumscription)

President of the Chamber of Deputies
- In office 19 March 2019 – 7 April 2020
- Preceded by: Maya Fernández
- Succeeded by: Diego Paulsen

Member of the Chamber of Deputies
- In office 11 March 2014 – 11 March 2022
- Preceded by: Alfonso de Urresti

Intendant of the Los Ríos Region
- In office 2 October 2007 – 26 October 2009
- President: Michelle Bachelet
- Preceded by: Office established
- Succeeded by: Alejandro Larsen

Personal details
- Born: 15 June 1955 (age 71) Puerto Montt, Chile
- Party: Christian Democratic Party
- Education: Austral University of Chile

Iván Alberto Flores García (born 15 June 1955) is a Chilean politician currently serving as a member of the Chamber of Deputies, representing District 24 of the Los Ríos Region. He served as President of the Chamber of Deputies from March 2019 to April 2020.

Flores served as intendant of the Los Ríos Region from its creation in 2007 until his resignation in 2009. Flores resigned after being heavily criticized at a national level by the opposition after he was photographed with propaganda of Eduardo Frei's presidential campaign while he was on official duties.

Flores had previously served as provincial governor of Valdivia from 1998 to 2000.

== Early life and education ==
Flores was born on 15 June 1955 in Puerto Montt. He is the son of Belisario Flores Cuellar and Elena García Quintana. He is married to Marta Andrea Larraín Grosolli and is the father of one daughter.

He earned a degree in veterinary medicine from the Austral University of Chile in 1978. His undergraduate thesis was titled “Determinación del flujo sanguíneo hepático en ovinos, mediante la prueba de Bromosulftaleína (BSP).”

Between 1990 and 1998, he pursued graduate studies in rural development at the same university, completing coursework for a master’s degree. He also undertook postgraduate training, technical courses, and professional work in planning, local and regional development, public health, animal health, animal production, and urban development in several countries, including Mexico, Guatemala, Honduras, the United States, Japan, Spain, and Chile.

== Professional career ==
Between 1979 and 1986, Flores worked as a consultant with the Regional Development Project (PRODERO) technical team in Honduras. From 1981 to 1982, he served as regional director of the Animal Health Programme (PSA) in that country, and subsequently as western regional director of the Animal Production Programme. In 1987, he held the position of technical head of the National Programme for the Promotion of Bovine Production and Animal Health (PROFOGASA), also in Honduras.

From 1990 to 1998, he worked in the retail trade sector in the city of Valdivia.

Between 2000 and 2004, he served as chairman of the board of Sociedad Valdicor Ltda., and between June 2004 and April 2007, he was general manager of Sociedad Desarrollo Urbano Valdicor Limitada.

From 2010 to 2013, Flores served as director of national and regional relations at the Austral University of Chile in Valdivia.

== Political career ==
Between 1994 and 1998, Flores held various public administration posts in the Province of Valdivia, including provincial delegate of the Ministry of Planning and provincial delegate of the Housing and Urbanization Service (SERVIU). From 1998 to 2000, he served as governor of Valdivia Province.

Between 2000 and 2004, he again served as provincial delegate of SERVIU.

In the 2000 Chilean municipal elections, Flores was elected councillor of the Municipality of Valdivia, representing the Christian Democratic Party. He served two consecutive terms, from 2000 to 2004 and from 2004 to 2008.

In April 2007, he was appointed presidential delegate for the creation of the new Los Ríos Region. Following the region’s establishment, he served as its first intendant between October 2007 and October 2009.

In August 2013, Flores won the Nueva Mayoría primary election to stand as a candidate for the Chamber of Deputies in District No. 53 of the Los Ríos Region. He was elected deputy and subsequently re-elected in the 2017 Chilean general election.

In August 2021, he registered his candidacy for the Senate of Chile representing the Christian Democratic Party in the 12th senatorial constituency of the Los Ríos Region. In the 2021 Chilean general election, he was elected senator within the Nuevo Pacto Social coalition, obtaining 21,153 votes (14.23%).
