= Lacuy Peninsula =

Peninsula on Chiloé Island, Chile

Coordinates: 41.823167°S 73.9981944°W

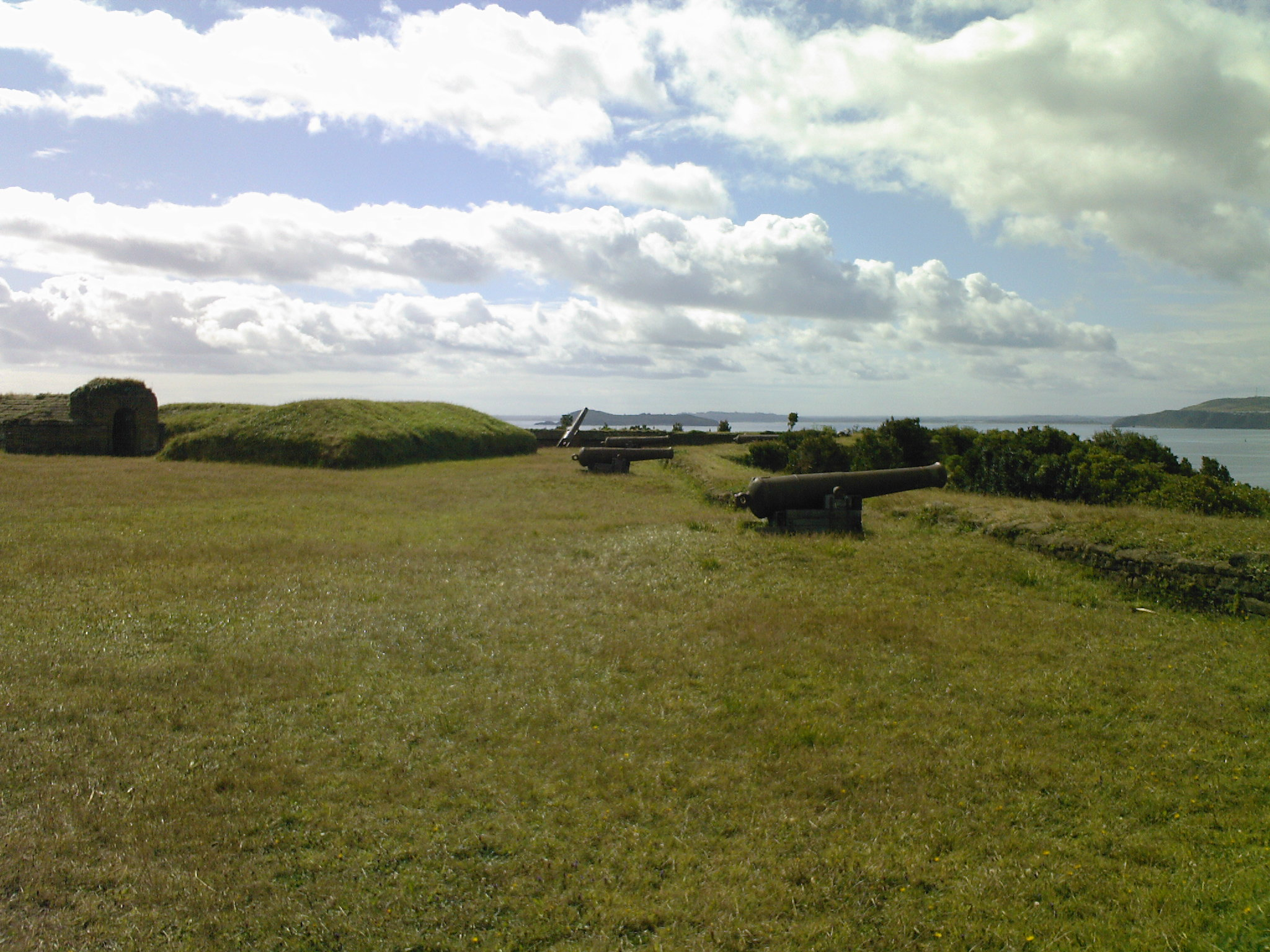
View of the Fuerte a Agüi at the eastern end of the peninsula.

The Lacuy Peninsula (Spanish: península de Lacuy), alternatively spelled with i, is located in the northwestern corner of Chiloé Island. The peninsula lies a few kilometers (miles) west of Ancud but the isthmus that connects to the rest Chiloé Island lies more than 10 kilometres (6.2 mi) west of Ancud. During colonial times, the peninsula hosted a Spanish fort system consisting of three batteries, one sentinel outpost, and one fort. The fort, named Fuerte de Agüi, was the site of the battle of Agüi in 1820. The geological Lacui Formation is named after the peninsula.
