= Lacui Formation =

Marine Miocene sedimentary formation in Chiloé Island

- Stratigraphic range: Serravallian (Laventan); ~13.8–11.8 Ma
- Type: Geological formation
- Overlies: Ancud Volcanic Complex

Location
- Coordinates: 41°50′S 74°00′W
- Region: Chiloé Island (Los Lagos Region)
- Country: Chile

Type section
- Named for: Lacuy Peninsula
- Named by: Valenzuela
- Year defined: 1982
- Lacui Formation (Chile)

Lacui Formation (Spanish: Formación Lacui) is a marine Miocene sedimentary formation located in Chiloé Island with minor outcrops near Carelmapu on the mainland. Gastropod shells are the most common macrofossils of Lacui Formation. According to Sernageomin (1998) the formation dates to the earliest Serravallian — that is the Middle Miocene.

South of Lacui Formation there are equivalent sedimentary rocks in the islands of Ipún, Lemo and Stoke.

== See also ==
- Lacuy Peninsula
- Navidad Formation
- Santo Domingo Formation
