= Catamutún =

Coal mine and locality in Chile

Coordinates: 40°09′13″S 73°07′52″W

Catamutún is a coal mine and locality in Los Ríos Region, Chile. Catamutún is located 25 km away from the city of La Unión. Coal has been mined in Los Ríos Region since the 1930s and Catamutún begun in 1945 to be exploited by Compañía Carbonífera San Pedro de Catamutún, an enterprise which has since then expanded into limestone mining.

The Catamutún mine complex was as of 1990 made up of three individual mine where the same coal bed was mined. The mines were San Pedro, Antihual and Bandurrias. The exploited coal bed is divided into an upper and lower bed by a small light grey claystone bed. There are only few faults in the beds. The coal bed belongs to either or Cheuquemó Formation or Estratos de Pupunahue. ENAP geologists have instead named "Osorno Formation" the coal-bearing formation and estimated a Serravallian age for the marine strata that overlie the coal beds. Mining is facilitated by the lack of any significant fault displacement of the coal beds. The coal of Catamutún are sub-bituminous, low in sulfur and of heat contents of 5,800–6,150 Kcal/kg.

Early mentions of coal near Catamutún include a description by Rodolfo Amando Philippi in 1851 and a passage in Vicente Pérez Rosales' book Recuerdos del pasado in 1855. Mining explorations were performed by private individuals in 1873 and by public works in 1908. In 1945 Catamutún begun to be exploited by Compañía Carbonífera San Pedro de Catamutún. Mining was done using room and pillar and the longwall mining systems depending on the local conditions. The introduction of longwall mining improved the recovery rates of the mines.

Miners lived initially in a mining camp the Catamutún area. Conditions in the mining cominity were precarious, particularly for children, which led social workers and the mining company to create saving accounts to finance a housing project. so that workers moved in the late 1980s to the new Miraflores neighborhood in city of La Unión. La Unión, a city with better services and schooling opportunities, became thus a dormitory town for miners. Most miners had a peasant background, which they retained after they began to work in the mines. Example of this are the leave request miners did in order to be able to sow or harvest potatoes, or the fact that miners spent their free time in their farms rather than together with other miners. Mining in Catamutún ceased in the late 1990s. Until that point Catamutún had been the only coal mine in Los Ríos Region and Los Lagos Region in continuous operations from the 1940s. Some workers were transferred by the company to the Mulpún mine (Note: This mine was purchased by Compañía Carbonífera San Pedro de Catamutún in 1987.) where mining continued until 2001.
