= Cheuquemó Formation =

Cenozoic geologic formation

- Stratigraphic range: Late Oligocene–Early Miocene
- Unit of: Osorno–Llanquihue Basin
- Underlies: Santo Domingo Formation
- Overlies: Bahía Mansa Metamorphic Complex
- Thickness: more than 1,200 m (3,900 ft)

Lithology
- Primary: Conglomerate, sandstone, mudstone, tuff
- Other: Coal

Location
- Coordinates: 40.0°S 73.0°W
- Region: Los Lagos Region
- Country: Chile

Type section
- Named by: Floreal García
- Year defined: 1968
- Cheuquemó Formation (Chile)

Cheuquemó Formation (Spanish: Formación Cheuquemó) is a geological formation of sedimentary rock in south-central Chile. The sediments of the formation were deposited during the Late Oligocene and Early Miocene epochs. The formations lower sections are made up of conglomerate, then successions of sandstone, tuff and mudstone rich in organic material follows. The formation indicates that sedimentation occurred in an estuarine (paralic) and other non-marine (continental) environments. It contains fossils of the following genera: Mytilus, Cardium and Turritella. Stratigraphically it overlies the Bahía Mansa Metamorphic Complex and underlies the Miocene Santo Domingo Formation.

== Description ==
The formation is very similar to the Pupunahue Beds found further north, with the sole difference that the fossil assemblage in both seem to indicate different ages. While Cheuquemó is possibly about 14 million years old (Miocene), the Pupunahue Beds are 35–25 million years old.

== See also ==
- Coal mining in Chile
