= Jagüel Formation =

Geological formation in Argentina

- Stratigraphic range: Maastrichtian-Danian (pre-Tiupampan); ~68–63 Ma
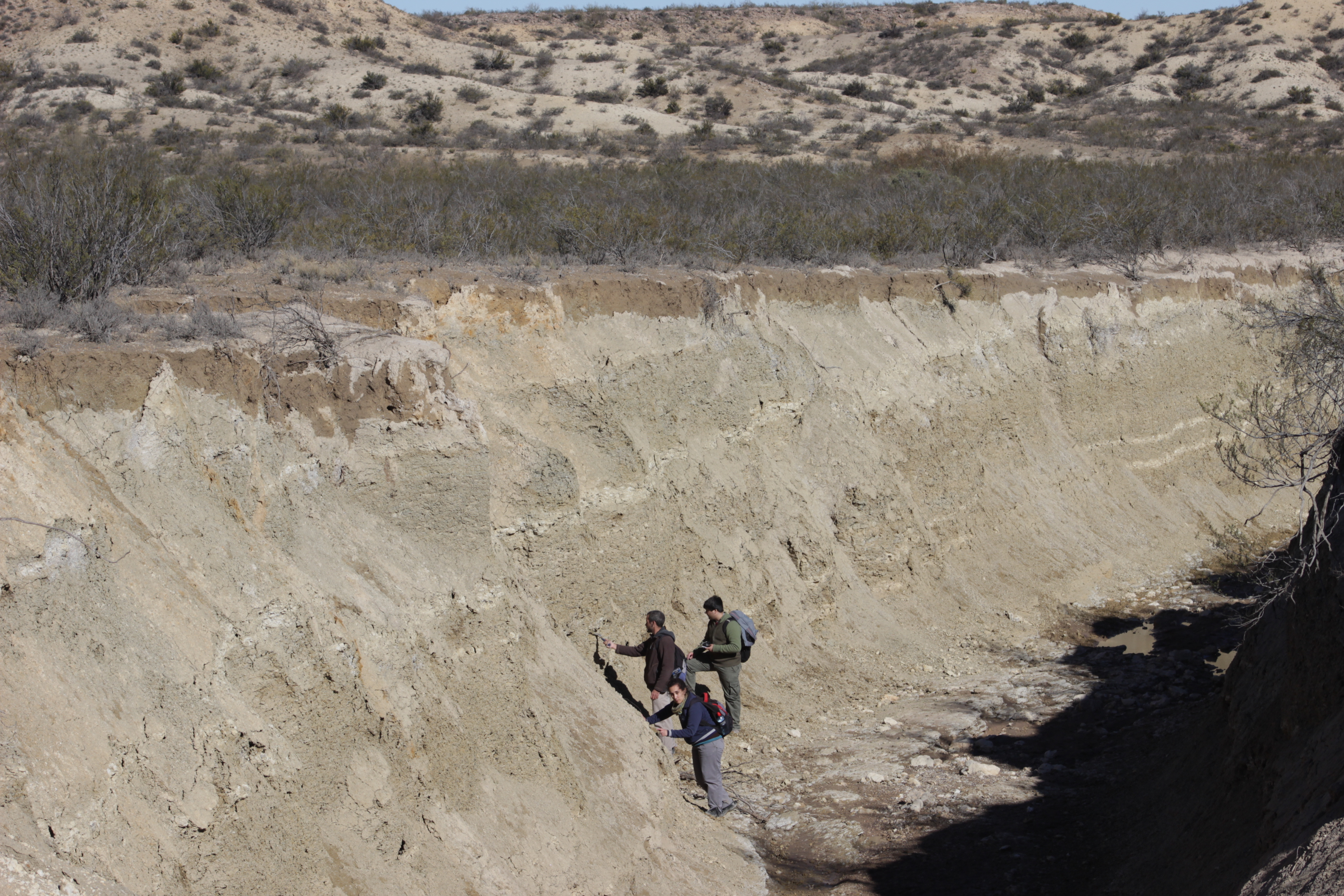
- Outcrops of Malargüe Group in Cañadón Cholino (General Roca)
- Type: Geological formation
- Unit of: Malargüe Group
- Underlies: Roca Formation
- Overlies: Allen Formation

Lithology
- Primary: Claystone, siltstone, mudstone

Location
- Coordinates: 38.9°S 67.6°W
- Approximate paleocoordinates: 41.5°S 56.0°W
- Region: Río Negro, Neuquén & Mendoza Provinces
- Country: Argentina
- Extent: Neuquén Basin

Type section
- Named for: Jagüel de Rosauer
- Named by: Windhausen
- Year defined: 1914
- Jagüel Formation (Argentina)

The Jagüel Formation is a geological formation, located in Patagonia, Argentina. It underlies the Roca Formation and overlies the Allen Formation. All of these formations belong to the Malargüe Group. Its name was coined by Windhausen in 1914. This unit, defined in the eastern area of the Neuquén Embayment, registers an event of marine flooding that happened during the ages Maastrichtian and Danian. It consists of mudrocks formed between the upper section or "Gypsum" of the Allen Formation, and the base of the first organogenic limestone of the Roca Formation. The Jagüel Formation is particularly important since a vast area of the formation contains the Cretaceous–Paleogene boundary that marks the end of the Mesozoic Era. It also shows evidence of the Cretaceous–Paleogene (K–Pg) extinction event. In this period of time, animal species became extinct, such as non–avian dinosaurs, the last marine reptiles, ammonites, and many groups of microfossils.

== Area distribution ==
The main outcrops of the Jagüel Formation are found in the inner sectors of the Neuquén Basin, where the "Rocanense Sea" reached its maximum depth. In the Andean region, it crops out in the south of Mendoza, where its fossil content dates back to the age Maastrichtian. In the area of Huantraico (Neuquén), the Jagüel Formation crops out at Cerro Villegas, where it is 23 metres (75 ft) thick.

Moreover, its outcrops are partially covered in the eastern flank of Añelo low (sector Lomas Coloradas–sierras Blanca), in the surrounding area of Pellegrini Lake, in the hills to the north of Río Negro extending to General Roca. Having reduced outcrops, it can be observed in the surroundings of Casa de Piedra reservoir. Due to its fine and homogeneous lithology, its outcrops have few morphological features and they are often partially covered.

== Lithology ==
The Jagüel Formation consists of monotonous olive green and yellowish mudrocks (claystones, siltstones, mudstones), traversed by thin veins of fibrous gypsum. These veins are found on the meteorized surface and they give distinct brightness to the outcrops. The claystones are plastic and friable, with waxy brightness. Some of them are laminated, while the siltstones are grayish.

With these distinct characteristics, it crops out in its type locality (Jagüel de Rosauer) and at Lomas Coloradas, where the unit is 18–26 m thick (59–85 ft). The outcrops around Pellegrini Lake keep the typical characteristics of the unit. Olive green calcareous mudrocks appear in the northern sector of the lake, which are solid and friable with fragmentary remains of molluscs (oysters). In this sector, there is also abundant fossil content composed of scallops and small brachiopods. Besides, there is an important microfaunal assemblage from the mid–Maastrichtian. In this area, it has a maximum thickness of 30 m (98 ft).

In the hills located in the north of General Roca (type locality of the Roca Formation), the outcrops of the Jagüel Formation are very friable, and they are covered by rock fragments from upper layers of the same unit. They are brown–olive. They make up the base of the hills and have the typical aspect of this unit. The boundary with the overlying Roca Formation is marked by yellowish resistant limestones.

Finally, the lower part of the Jagüel Formation crops out above the southern margin of Casa de Piedra reservoir. It is composed of brown–ochre mudrocks, with many veins of gypsum at the base, and a thin layer of highly fossiliferous limestones that lies 1 m (3 ft) above its contact with the Allen Formation. The outcropping thickness of the unit is 25 m (82 ft). Dark brown friable mudstones crop out above the northern shore of the reservoir, with remaining molluscs in the lower part, near the shore. In the upper section, there are ochre mudrocks which are gypseous, and its outcrops are partially covered; there, its thickness is 20 m (66 ft). In this sector, the Jagüel Formation is covered unconformably by the Vaca Mahuida Formation.

In the area of Huantraico, there are greenish calcareous mudstones, with thin intercalations of calcareous sandstones; the mudstones are solid or laminated. The lithofacies characteristics of the unit suggest an outer continental shelf environment, below the normal wave base.

== Age and correlations ==
The micropaleontological content of the Jagüel Formation made it possible to classify it as Maastrichtian–Danian (Early and Late). This formation conformably overlies the Allen Formation and it also conformably underlies the Roca Formation . The Pircala–El Carrizo Formation lies above these formations. All of them belong to the Malargüe Group.

== Fossil content ==
=== Microfossils ===
The Jagüel Formation, aged Maastrichtian and Danian, constitutes the peak of the transgression within the Malargüe Group, reaching maximum depths of a mid–outer shelf environment. It has abundant marine microfossils, such as planktonic and benthic foraminifera, calcareous ostracods and nannofossils, as well as dinoflagellates. Generally, they are well preserved. The micropaleontological record of the Jagüel Formation is of paramount importance since this unit contains the Cretaceous–Paleogene boundary in different localities, which marks the Cretaceous–Paleogene (K–Pg) extinction event.

=== Reptiles ===
The record of faunal marine reptiles include mosasaurs and the marine turtle Euclastes meridionalis.

=== Macroinvertebrates ===
As a result of a taxonomic revision of the Cretaceous–Paleogene (K–Pg) boundary, oysters in the Neuquén Basin, in the west of Argentina, it was mentioned that there were Pycnodonte (Phygraea) vesicularis, Amphidonte mendozana, Ostrea wilckensi, Gyrostrea lingua, Ambigostrea clarae, and Gryphaeostrea callophyla.

Moreover, it was observed that there were other specimens, like bivalves, gastropods, irregular echinoids, bryozoans, and decapods.

== Depositional environment ==
The Jagüel Formation contains marine deposits accumulated in inner positions of the basin, with depths that vary from a mid to an outer continental shelf. Sedimentological and paleontological evidence suggests a predominance of normal atmospheric conditions, below the normal wave base and with optimal circulation, away from the sources of detritus supply.
