= Roca Formation, Argentina =

Geological formation in Argentina

Roca Formation
- Stratigraphic range: Maastrichtian-late Danian (pre-Tiupampan); ~68–63 Ma
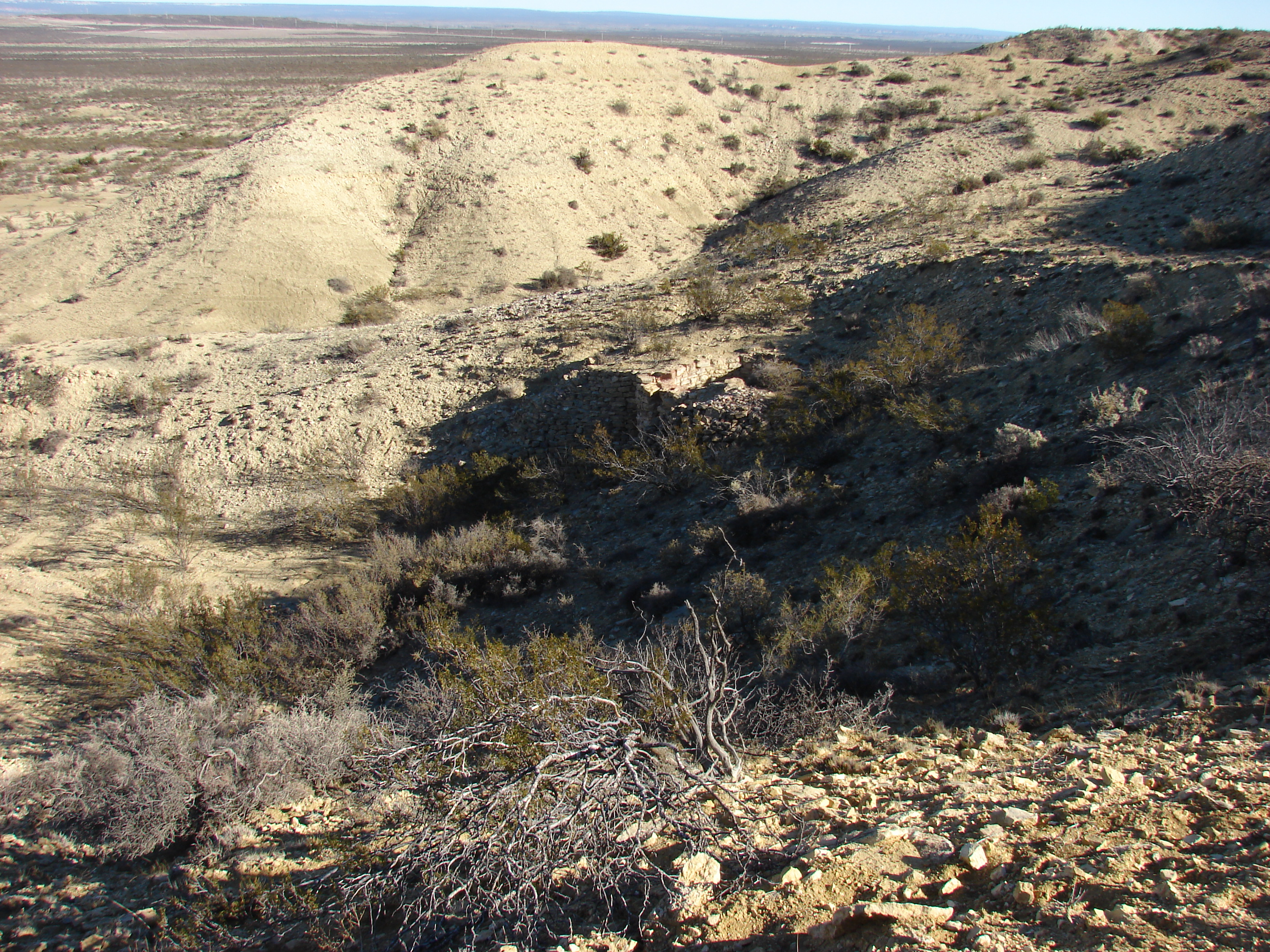
- Roca Formation in Barda Norte, General Roca, Río Negro
- Type: Geological formation
- Unit of: Malargüe Group
- Sub-units: 3 members
- Underlies: El Carrizo & Pircala Formations
- Overlies: Jagüel Formation
- Thickness: Up to 58 m (190 ft)

Lithology
- Primary: Limestone, claystone, siltstone
- Other: Gypsum

Location
- Coordinates: 38.9°S 67.6°W
- Approximate paleocoordinates: 41.5°S 56.0°W
- Region: Río Negro, Neuquén, La Pampa & Mendoza Provinces
- Country: Argentina
- Extent: Neuquén Basin

Type section
- Named for: General Roca
- Roca Formation, Argentina (Argentina)

The Roca Formation is a Cretaceous to Paleogene lithostratigraphic unit, located in the Neuquén Basin. It crops out in the Argentinian provinces of Río Negro, Neuquén, La Pampa, and Mendoza. Its deposition is diachronous, beginning during the Maastrichtian in the north of its distribution, and later moving to the south, where its strata reached the Late Danian. It lies transitionally above the Jagüel Formation, and the top of the formation is marked by a regional unconformity due to an Eocene and Oligocene orogenic pulse. These two units belong to the Malargüe Group. The marine sediments of the Jagüel and Roca Formations were deposited during a transgression from the Atlantic Ocean, beginning in the Maastrichtian and ending in the Danian.

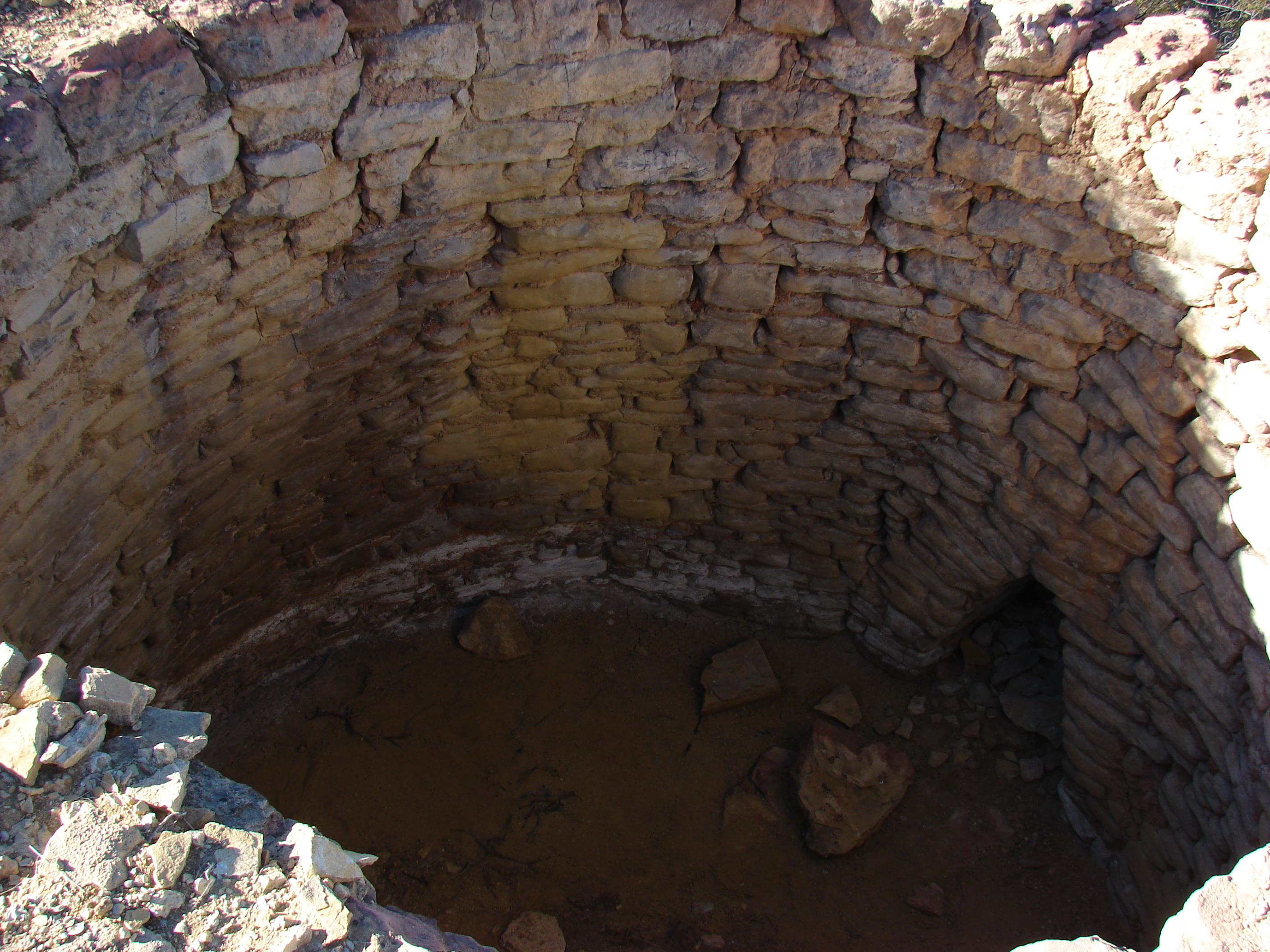
Lime kiln in Barda Norte Locality, General Roca, Río Negro, Argentina

The stratotype of the Roca Formation is located 12 kilometres (7.5 mi) north of General Roca, Río Negro (39º40´S, 67º32´W). The fossiliferous beds of the Roca Formation were discovered by G. Rohde Windhausen (1914), who was also the first author to describe these sediments. Schiller (1922) took samples of one section along the Zanjón Roca, from the northern part of General Roca to Horno de Cal (lime kiln). This author proposed to name the lime kiln as the "classic area", and the westward cliffs from the lime kiln as the "model area" of these beds. The lithological composition of this type locality contains gray-yellowish and highly fossiliferous limestones, with greenish claystones and marls, and abundant gypsum at the top. The basal and middle sections are approximately 26 metres (85 ft) thick (Weber, 1972).

== Lithology ==
In its type locality, the Roca Formation is divided into three sections. The first section, that is, the base, is approximately 20 metres (66 ft). It consists of intercalated bioclastic limestones and green claystones. The calcareous materials are highly fossiliferous with textures like wackestone and packstone without an obvious orientation of the shells. The claystones are composed of montmorillonite with calcite and quartz. The second section (middle) is not over 8 metres (26 ft) and consists mainly of limestones. Such section has very thin strata of varied yellow limestones and siltstones, interbedded with yellow porous and coarse-grained limestones. The limestones of the middle section are almost devoid of fossil invertebrates. The third section (upper) is 25 to 30 metres (82 to 98 ft). It is mainly composed of white gypsum in large crystals. It has lenticular intercalations of greenish siltstones with wave-formed ripples and fragments of gypsum.

The faunal character on the fossils of marine invertebrates in the Roca Formation suggests a transgression from the Atlantic Ocean. By contrast, the marine invasions in Argentina and Chile during the Jurassic and Early Cretaceous were caused by an inflow of seawater from the Pacific Ocean.

== Fossil content ==
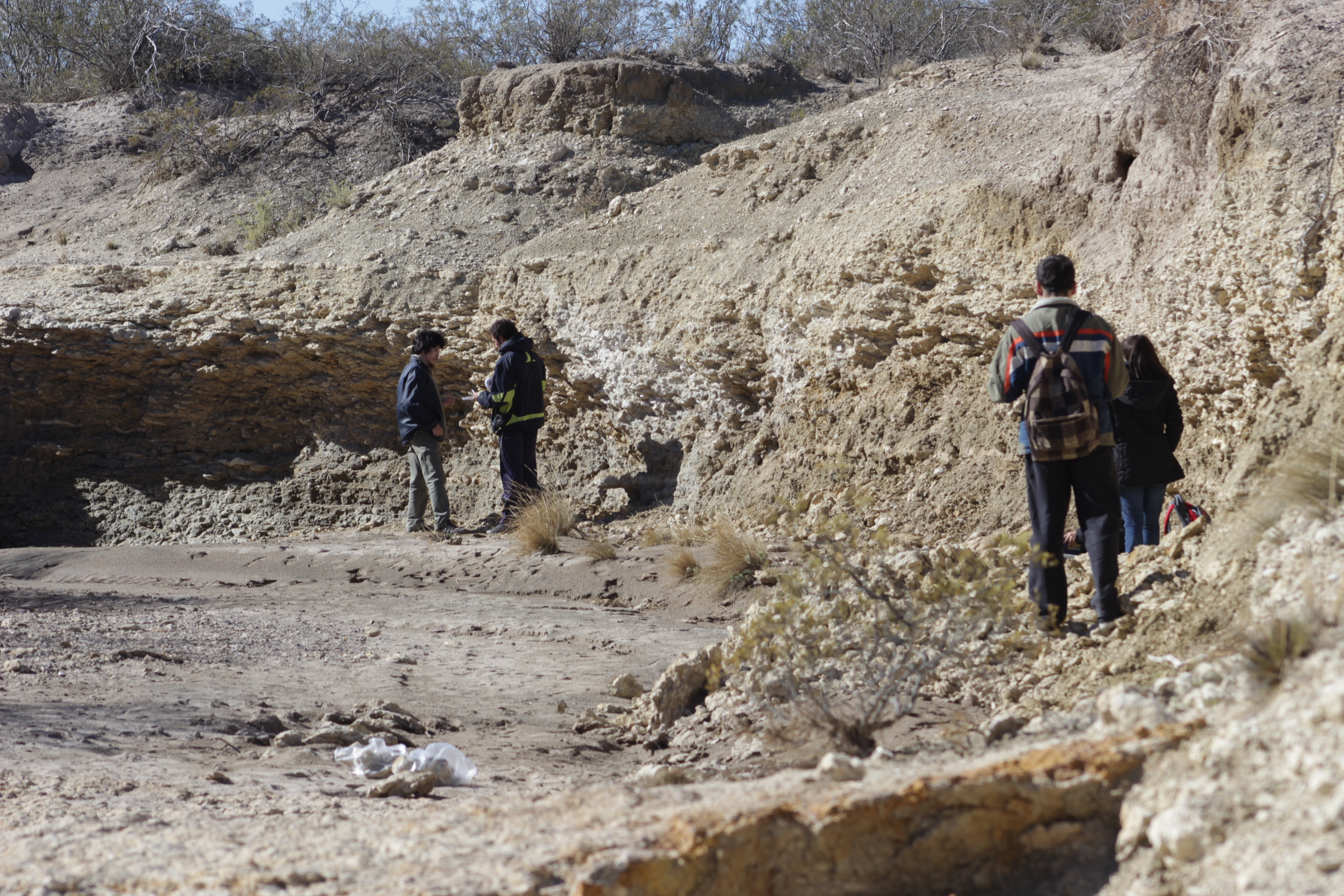
Limestones in Roca Formation, Cantera Cholino, General Roca, Río Negro

The first section of the Roca Formation has abundant fossiliferous content, including bivalves, gastropods, bryozoans, echinoderms, crustaceans, ostracods, foraminifera, and calcareous nanoplankton, as well as remains of fish.

=== Bivalves ===
- Pycnodonte (Phygraea) burckhardti (Boehm)
- Pycnodonte (Phygraea) sarmientoi Casadío 1998
- Gryphaeostrea callophyla (Ihering)
- Ostrea wilckensi Ihering
- Ostrea neuquena Ihering
- Cubitostrea ameghinoi (Ihering)
- Nucula (Leionucula) dynastes Ihering
- Neilo cf. N. ornata (Sowerby)
- Cucullaea rocana Ihering
- Chlamys patagonensis negroina Ihering
- Musculus rionegrensis (Ihering)
- Arca ameghinorum Ihering (=Venericardia ameghinorum)
- Venericardia iheringi (Boehm)
- V. feruglioi Petersen
- Aphrodina burckhardti (Ihering)

=== Gastropods ===
- "Aporrhais" spp.
- Turritella burckhardti Ihering
- Turritella aff. T. malaspina Ihering

=== Nautoloids ===
- Hercoglossa romeroi (Ihering)
- Cimomia camachoi Masiuk

=== Decapods ===
- Callianassa burckhardti Boehm

=== Echinoida ===
- Linthia joannisboehmi Oppenheim
- Nucleopygus salgadoi Parm
