= Bernardo Berger =

Chilean politician

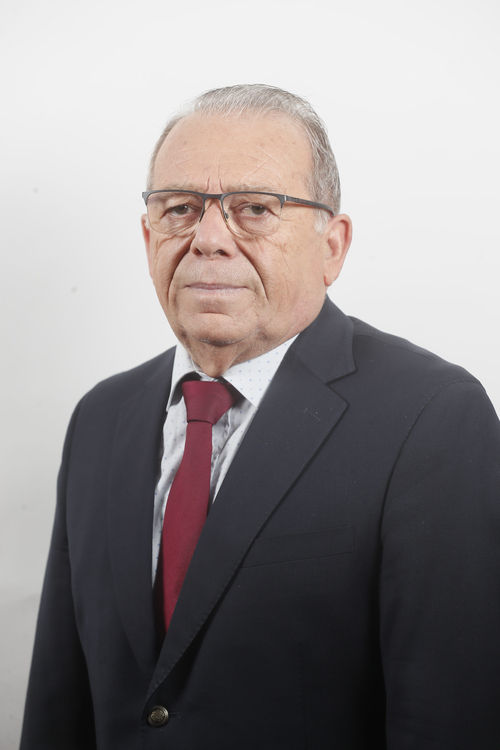

Member of the Chamber of Deputies of Chile
- In office 11 March 2018 – 11 March 2026
- Constituency: 24th district
- In office 11 March 2014 – 11 March 2018
- Preceded by: Roberto Delmastro
- Succeeded by: Dissolution of the district
- Constituency: 53rd district

Mayor of Valdivia
- In office 6 December 2000 – 6 December 2012
- Preceded by: Jorge Sabat Gozalo
- Succeeded by: Omar Sabat Guzmán
- In office November 1989 – 26 September 1992
- Appointed by: Augusto Pinochet
- Preceded by: Eduardo Schild
- Succeeded by: Gonzalo Espinoza

Councilman of Valdivia
- In office 6 December 1992 – 6 December 2000

Personal details
- Born: 4 October 1946 (age 80) Valdivia, Chile
- Party: National Renewal (RN) (1987–2020)

Bernardo José Berger Fett (born 4 October 1946) is a Chilean politician who served in the Chamber of Deputies of Chile.
