= Bahía Mansa Metamorphic Complex =

- Stratigraphic range: Carboniferous, ~330–385 Ma
- Type: Geological complex
- Underlies: Mesozoic and Cenozoic sediments
- Thickness: Thousands of meters

Lithology
- Primary: Pelitic schist
- Other: Blueschist, Greenschist, Slate

Location
- Coordinates: 40.5°S 73°W
- Region: Los Ríos Region, Los Lagos Region
- Country: Chile

Type section
- Named for: Bahía Mansa

The Bahía Mansa Metamorphic Complex (Spanish: Complejo Metamórfico Bahía Mansa, CMBM), also known as the Western Series, is a group of geologic formations in the Chilean Coast Range in southern Chile that have been transformed by heat and pressure (a process called metamorphism). It includes pelitic schists (layered rocks from mud or clay), metagreywackes (hardened sandy sediments altered by metamorphism), and mafic metavolcanics (dark-colored rocks from ancient ocean floors). The complex is named after Bahía Mansa, a nearby coastal bay.
