= Paso Flores Formation =

Geological formation in Patagonia, Argentina

- Stratigraphic range: Latest Late Triassic; ~205–202 Ma
- Type: Geological formation
- Underlies: Sañicó, Nestares, Collón Curá, Caleufú & Cerro Petiso Formations
- Overlies: Cushamen basement
- Thickness: Up to 230 m (750 ft)

Lithology
- Primary: Conglomerate, sandstone
- Other: Shale

Location
- Coordinates: 40.5°S 70.5°W
- Approximate paleocoordinates: 50.1°S 31.1°W
- Region: Neuquén Province
- Country: Argentina
- Extent: Southern Neuquén Basin

Type section
- Named for: Balsa Paso Flores
- Named by: Fossa Mancini
- Year defined: 1937
- Paso Flores Formation (Argentina)

The Paso Flores Formation is a latest Late Triassic (Rhaetian) geologic formation in the Neuquén Basin of Neuquén Province in northwestern Patagonia, Argentina. The brown to red-stained conglomerates, sandstones and shales of the formation represent the youngest and only latest Triassic sedimentary unit in the country, overlying basement.

The formation has provided a rich fossil flora of various groups, preserved in leaves and fossil wood in the finer lithologies in the Paso Flores Formation. The fossil flora is representative of the ecosystem of the latest Triassic, preceding the Triassic-Jurassic extinction event.

== Description ==
The formation was first defined by Fossa Mancini in 1937 as the Formación Continental de Paso Flores. Later, Frenguelli (1948) called the formation Estratos de Paso Flores ("Paso Flores Beds") and Galli (1954, 1969) described it as Serie de Paso Flores. Finally, the formation was described as Paso Flores Formation (Nullo, 1979, González Díaz, 1982, Spalletti et al., 1988). based on a type section exposed along the Limay River in the southern Neuquén Basin.

The Paso Flores Formation comprises conglomerates, sandstones and shales.

=== Extent ===
The formation crops out in its largest extent around the Limay River and the Ranquel-Huao hill and north of Estancia Corral de Piedra. Other outcrops are found northeast of Estancia Collón Curá y on the right banks of the Collón Curá River and in the cañadones of Pancho and El Pedregoso. The type section is found in the eponymous Paso Flores, on the left (western) banks of the Limay River and around Cerro Mariana. The national roads 40 and 237 cross-cut the formation.

=== Stratigraphy ===
Separated by a marked unconformity, the formation overlies the Paleozoic crystalline basement of the Cushamen Formation. The Paso Flores Formation is unconformably overlain by the Jurassic Sañicó and Nestares Formations, and Neogene Collón Curá, Caleufú and Cerro Petiso Formations and by alluvium.

The Sañicó Lineament puts the Paso Flores Formation in contact with Famatinian basement.

=== Age and correlation ===
González Díaz (1982) assigned a Late Triassic age to the formation, based on a paleofloristic analysis of the Paso Flores Formation executed west of the Collón Curá River. Ganuza et al. (1995) realized a paleobotanical study at Cañadón de Pancho and reached the same conclusion of a Late Triassic age. Zavattieri (1997) observed that the macro- and microflora indicated a Rhaetian age. Several taxa known from the Jurassic are present as well as typical Triassic taxa as Telemachus elongatus and Pagiophyllum. The formation is the only fossiliferous latest Triassic formation.

The Paso Flores Formation is correlated with the Garamilla, Los Menucos and Sierra Colorada Formations elsewhere in Argentina.

Dictyophyllum tenuifolium, whose type locality is the Paso Flores Formation, is also found in the Ladinian Cortaderita Formation of San Juan Province.

=== Lithology ===
The Paso Flores Formation is a terrestrial unit with a high fossil content, composed of conglomerates, conglomeratic sandstones and lightbrown sandstones and shales with iron staining. The thickness of the formation varies from 30 metres (98 ft) in the Ranquel Huao hills, 90 metres (300 ft) in the Cañadón de Pancho and according to Frenguelli (1948) and Spalletti et al.(1988), 263 metres (863 ft) in Estancia Paso Flores and Cerro Mariana.

The well-consolidated conglomerates comprise rounded polymict granitic and volcanic clasts of up to 20 centimetres (7.9 in) in a sandy matrix. Intercalated in the conglomerates are lenses of fine-to-medium grained sandstones and shales preserving fossil leaves and fossilized treetrunks.

== Fossil content ==
The Paso Flores has provided a variety of flora fossils, reported from three outcrops: In 2003, more specific descriptions were carried out of Cladophlebis grahami, C. denticulata, Dictyophyllum chihuiuensis, D. tenuiserratum and D. rothi, Rhexoxylon brunoi, Dicroidium crassum, D. odontopteroides, D. lancifolium, Xylopteris argentina and X. elongata. Abundant other flora are Scleropteris grandis, Linguifolium arctum, L. lilleanum, L. tenisonwoodsii and L. steinmannii, Cycadocarpidium and Heidiphyllum, Telemachus and Protocircoporoxylon marianaensis.

In 2017, several flora were described; Lutanthus ornatus, Rissikistrobus plenus, Rissikistrobus reductus, Rissikia media, Umkomasia sp., Sphenobaiera argentinae, Pseudoctenis spatulata, Taeniopteris crassinervis and Yabeiella brackebuschiana.

Additionally, Baiera triassica, in replacement of the homonymous species previously identified in Argentina as Baiera taeniata, Ginkgo taeniata and Sphenobaiera taeniata, were described as well as new species previously described from other locations than the analyzed Quemquemtreu area of the Cañadón Pancho locality. These species are: Asterotheca rigbyana, Marattiopsis muensteri, Cladophlebis kurtzii, C. indica, Dictyophyllum (Dictyophyllum) tenuifolium, Goeppertella stipanicicii, Dicroidium incisum, D. odontopteroides, D. lancifolium, Pachydermophyllum praecordillerae, Heidiphyllum elongatum, Baiera furcata, Sphenobaiera robusta, Pseudoctenis carteriana and P. falconeriana.

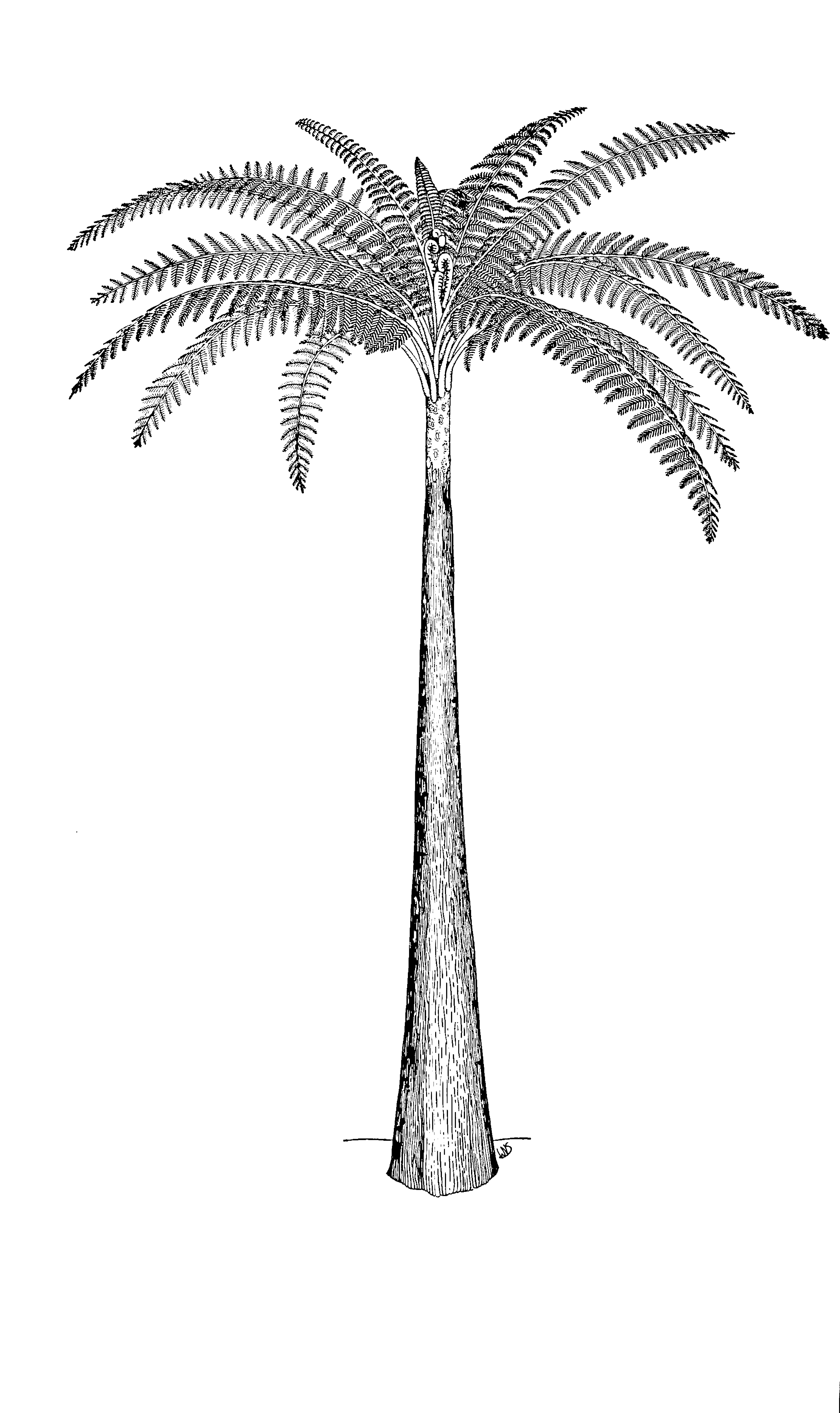
Asterotheca sp.

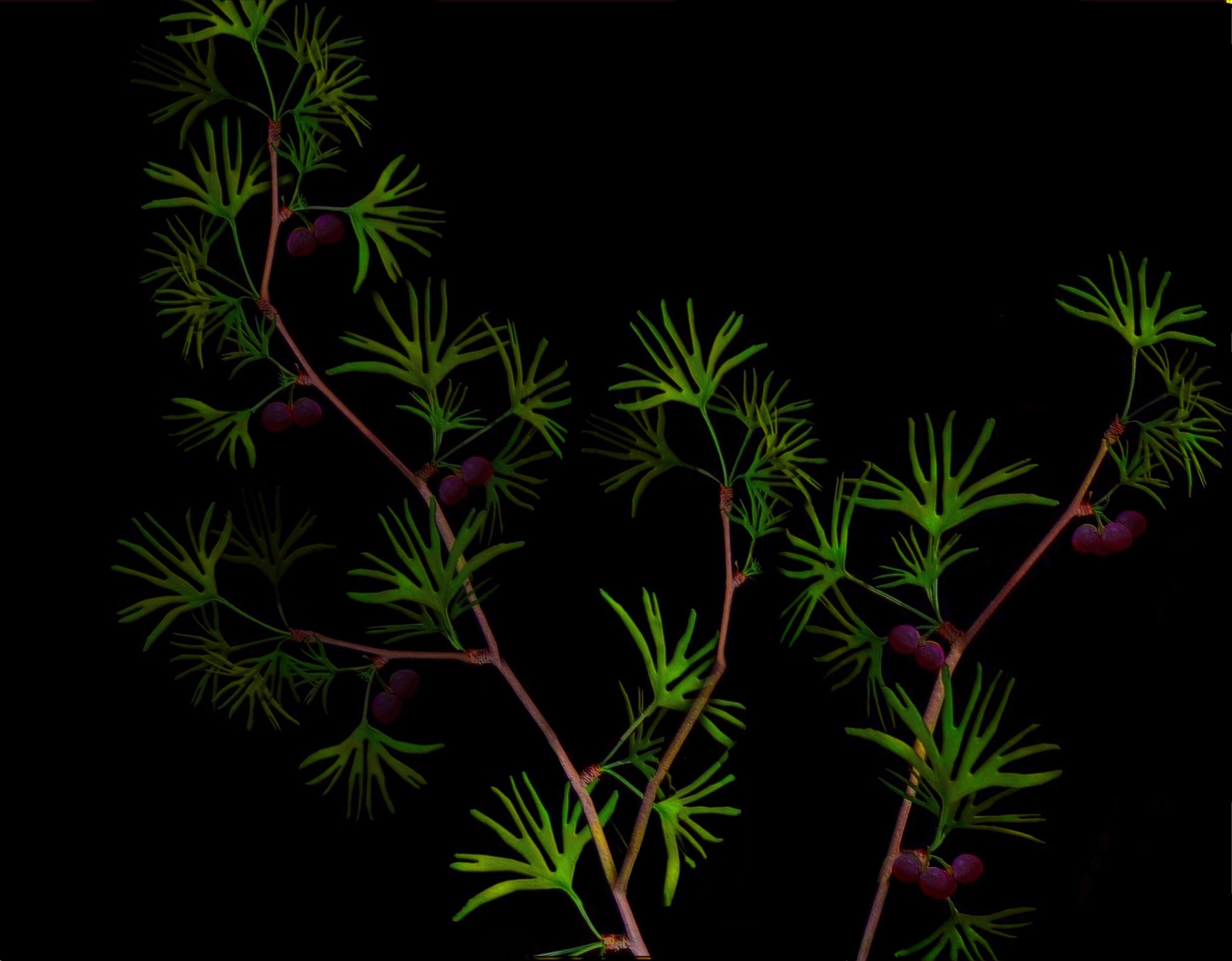
Baiera

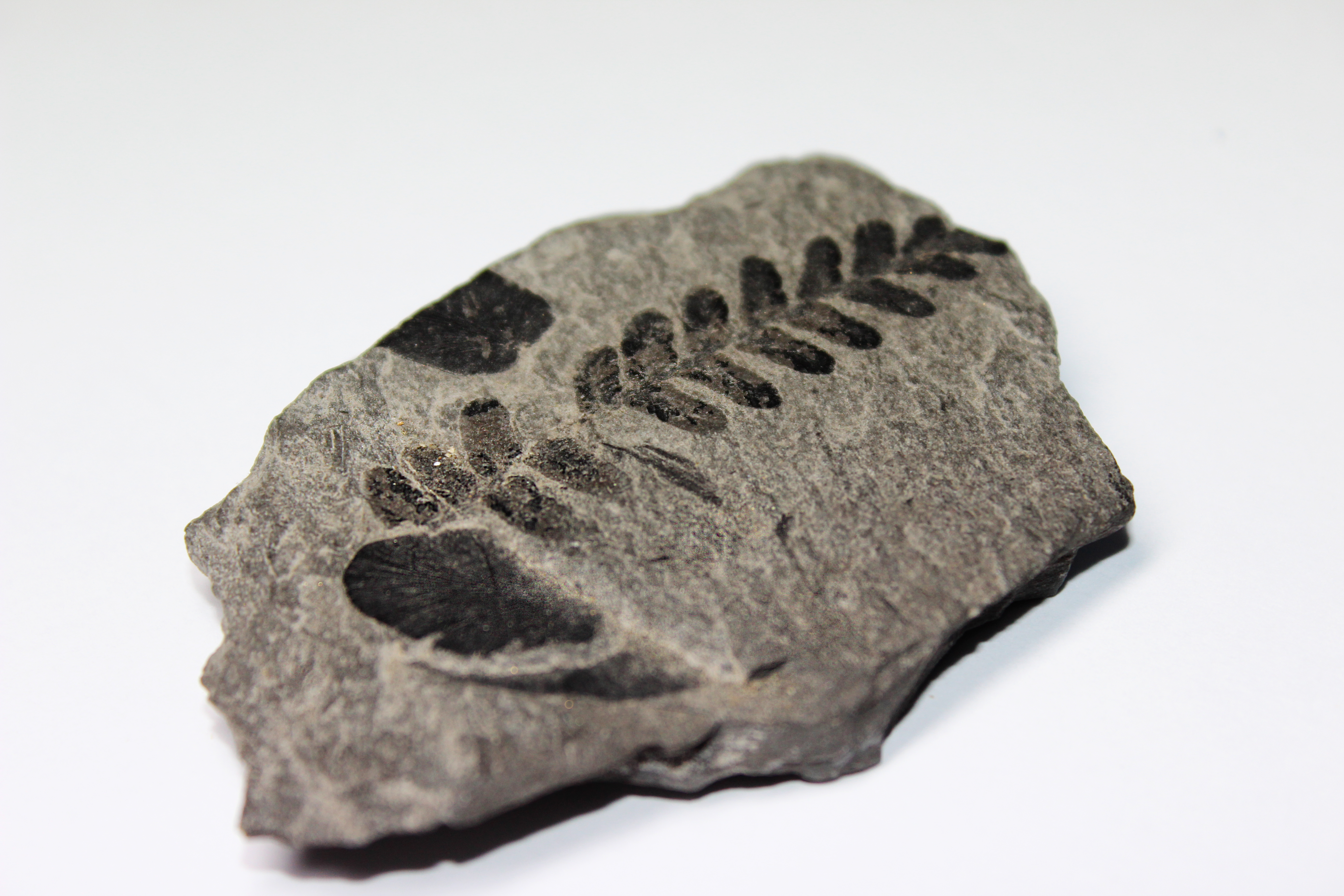
Cladophlebis (specimen from Eastern Europe)

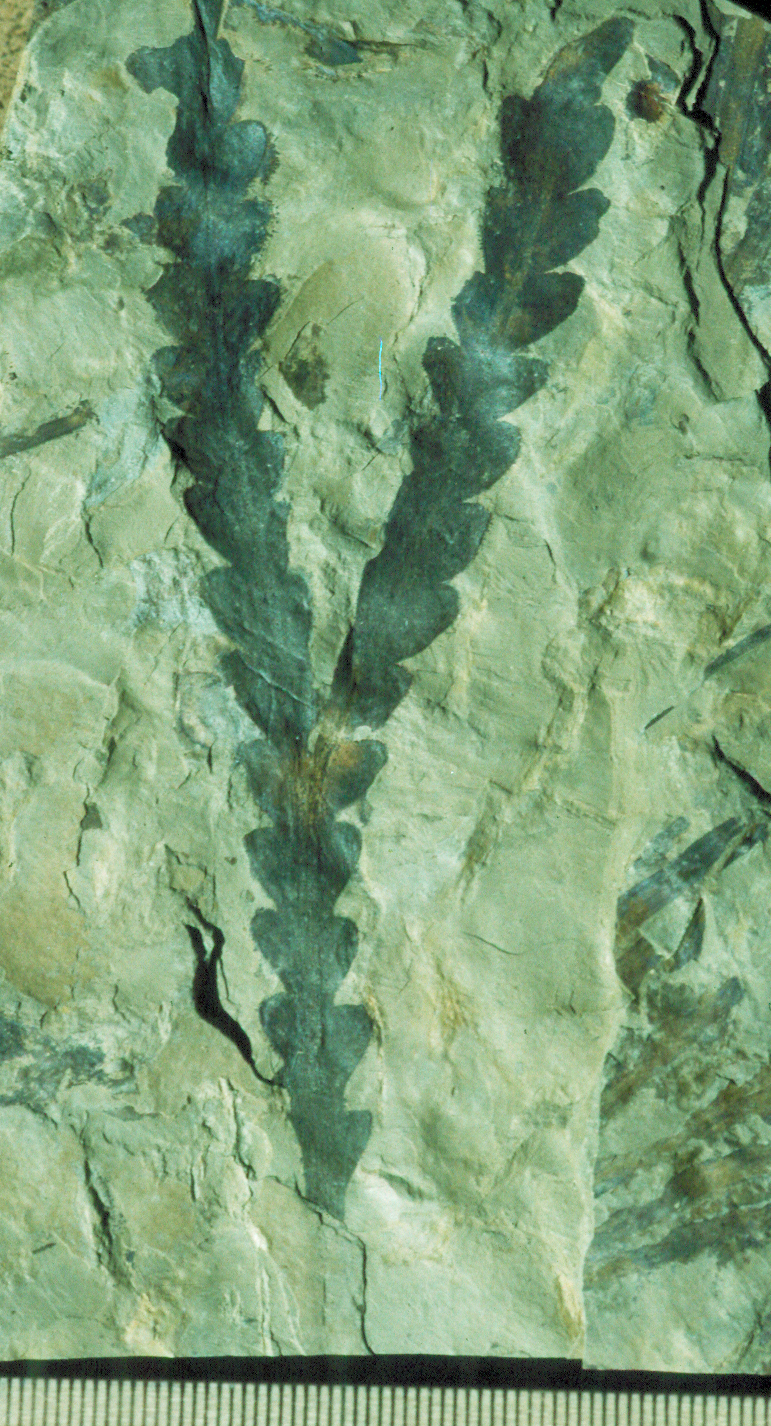
Dicroidium (specimen from South Africa)

=== Paso Flores ===
PGAP 2402 - Spalletti et al. (1988)

- Pinopsida
  - Araucarioxylon sp.
  - Araucarites sp.
- Peltaspermopsida
  - Dicroidium sp.
  - Xylopteris sp.
- Peltaspermopsida
  - Sphenobaiera sp.
- Ginkgoopsida
  - Baiera sp.
  - Czekanowskia sp.
  - Ginkgoites sp.
- Pinopsida
  - Podozamites sp.
  - Desmiophyllum sp.
  - Pseudoctenis sp.
- Polypodiopsida
  - Coniopteris sp.
  - Dictyophyllum sp.
- Polypodiopsida
  - Cladophlebis sp.

=== Cañadón del Ranquel Huao ===
PGAP 2403 - idem

- Peltaspermopsida
  - Dicroidium sp.
- Ginkgoopsida
  - Baiera sp.
- Pinopsida
  - Asterotheca sp.
  - Kurtziana sp.
  - Pachydermophyllum sp.
  - Podozamites sp.
  - Pseudoctenis sp.
- Polypodiopsida
  - Cladophlebis sp.
  - Coniopteris sp.
  - Dictyophyllum sp.
  - Thaumatopteris sp.

=== Cañadón de Pancho ===
PGAP 2404 - Artabe et al. (1994)

- Ginkgoopsida
  - Cycadocarpidium sp.
  - Czekanowskia sp.
  - Johnstonia sp.
  - Nilsonia sp.
  - Pseudoctenis sp.
  - Scleropteris sp.
  - Taeniopteris sp.
  - Zuberia sp.
- Peltaspermopsida
  - Dicroidium sp.
  - Heidiphyllum sp.
  - Linguifolium sp.
  - Sphenobaiera sp.
  - Xylopteris sp.

Additionally, several spores and pollen were described from the formation by Zavattieri and Mego in 2008:

== See also ==
- Tralcán Formation, contemporaneous formation in Chilean northern Patagonia
- Los Colorados Formation, Norian fossiliferous formation of the Ischigualasto-Villa Unión Basin in northwestern Argentina
- Elliot Formation, contemporaneous fossiliferous formation of South Africa
- Fremouw Formation, contemporaneous fossiliferous formation of Antarctica
- Lower Dharmaram Formation, contemporaneous fossiliferous formation of India
- Carapacha Formation, Permian fossil flora-bearing formation of Argentina
