= Brandoni =

Brandoni is a surname. Notable people with the surname include:

- Luis Brandoni (1940–2026), Argentine actor and politician
- Mauro Brandoni (born 1984), Argentine former professional footballer
- Zulma Brandoni (born 1944), Argentine paleontologist and zoologist
