= Elqui-Limarí Batholith =

Geological feature of Chile and Argentina

The Elqui-Limarí Batholith is a group of plutons in the Andes of Chile and Argentina between the latitudes of 28 and 30° S. The plutons of the batholith were emplaced and cooled in the Late Paleozoic and the earliest Mesozoic. Some of the plutons were emplaced in a context of crustal thickening related to the San Rafael orogeny.

Together with the Chilean Coastal Batholith and the Colangüil Batholith, the Elqui-Limarí Batholith is a remnant of the volcanic arcs that erupted the volcanic material of the Choiyoi Group. As Pangaea broke up at the end of the Paleozoic, ocean crust material was subducted under the eastern and western continental plates. Volcanic melts from this oceanic crustal material rose through the mantle and embedded themselves in the overlying continental crust. This process was the ultimate cause of these igneous intrusive bodies.
