= Víctor Alberto Ramos =

Argentine geologist (born 1945)

Víctor Ramos
- Education: University of Buenos Aires
- Known for: Contributions to the geology of South America
- Awards: Premio México de Ciencia y Tecnología (2013)
- Scientific career
- Fields: Tectonostratigraphy, Tectonics, Paleogeography, Structural geology
- Workplaces: University of Buenos Aires

Víctor Alberto Ramos (born 1945) is an Argentine geologist who has contributed to the paleogeography and plate tectonics of South America. He has been a member of the Chilean Academy of Science since 2001 and won in 2013 the Premio México de Ciencia y Tecnología.

Ramos was the first to recognize the existence of Chilenia and the former sea that separated it from the rest of South America (then part of Gondwana). At the time of the discovery in the 1980s it was considered to be speculative. In a 1988 conference in Chile the discovery of Chilenia was not well received and a payador at the conference ridiculed him. As the existence of Chilenia was recognized, he was made a member of the Chilean Academy of Sciences.

Together with other researchers Ramos has proposed to change the age of the Jurassic-Cretaceous boundary from 145 Ma to 140 Ma making the Jurassic longer. This proposal derives from a 2014 study based on biostratigraphy and radiometric dating of ash in the Vaca Muerta Formation in Neuquén Basin, Argentina. In Ramos' words the study would serve as a "first step" toward formally changing the age in the International Union of Geological Sciences.

Ramos has proposed that the Patagonian landmass originated as an allochthonous terrane that separated from Antarctica and docked in South America 250 to 270 Ma in the Permian period. A 2014 study by Robert John Pankhurst and co-workers reject the idea of a far-travelled Patagonia claiming it is likely of parautochthonous (nearby) origin.

Víctor Ramos has been a visiting professor at:

- Universidade Federal de Ouro Preto, Brazil
- Cornell University, United States
- Universidad de Chile, Chile
- Universidad Nacional de Salta, Argentina
- Universidad Nacional de San Juan, Argentina
- Universidad Nacional de San Luis, Argentina
- Universidade Federal do Rio Grande do Sul, Brazil
- University of São Paulo, Brazil
- Universidad Nacional del Sur, Argentina
- Universidad Nacional de Córdoba, Argentina
- Universidad Nacional de Asunción, Paraguay
- Universidad de la República, Uruguay
