= Lotena Formation =

Geologic formation in Argentina

- Stratigraphic range: Late Callovian-Early Oxfordian; ~165–160 Ma
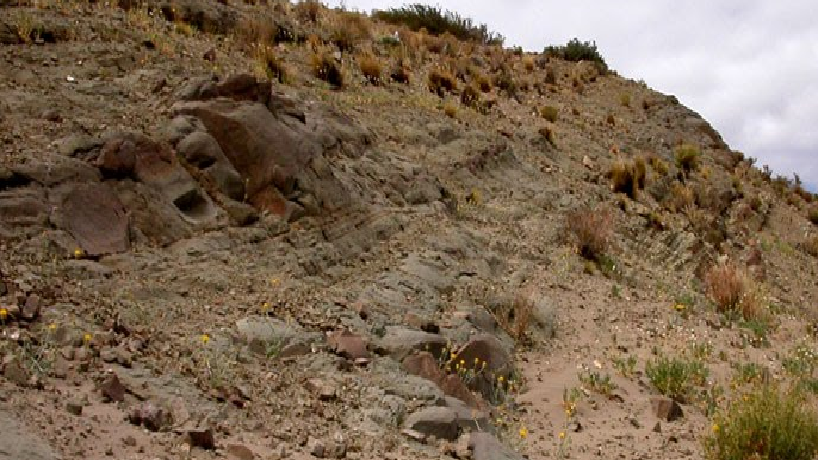
- Outcrops of the Lotena formation (2016)
- Type: Geological formation
- Unit of: Lotena Group
- Sub-units: La Estrechura, El Pichanal & El Vado Members
- Underlies: La Manga Formation
- Overlies: Cuyo Group; Lajas Formation
- Thickness: 50–167 m (164–548 ft)

Lithology
- Primary: Sandstone, conglomerate
- Other: Limestone, shale

Location
- Coordinates: 38.6°S 70.2°W
- Approximate paleocoordinates: 35.9°S 31.7°W
- Region: Neuquén Basin; Mendoza Province & Neuquén Province; Northern Patagonia
- Country: Argentina
- Extent: 2,500 km^{2} (970 sq mi)

Type section
- Named for: Cerro Lotena
- Named by: Weaver
- Year defined: 1931
- Lotena Formation (Argentina)

The Lotena Formation is a geologic formation dated from the Late Callovian to Early Oxfordian in the Neuquén Basin in Mendoza Province, Argentina. The formation, first defined by Weaver in 1931 and named after Cerro Lotena, consists of fluvial conglomerates, calcareous sandstones and marine limestones and shales. The Lotena Formation is overlain by the La Manga Formation and overlies the Lajas Formation of the Cuyo Group. Initially, the fossil find of the pterosaur Herbstosaurus pigmaeus was reported from the formation, but this fossil was found in the younger Vaca Muerta. The formation is a reservoir rock in the Neuquén Basin.

== See also ==
- Los Molles Formation, contemporaneous formation of the Neuquén Basin
- Cañadón Calcáreo Formation, contemporaneous formation of the Cañadón Asfalto Basin
