= Wenupteryx =

Wenupteryx Temporal range: Tithonian ~150–146 Ma

Scientific classification
- Kingdom: Animalia
- Phylum: Chordata
- Class: Reptilia
- Order: †Pterosauria
- Suborder: †Pterodactyloidea
- Genus: †Wenupteryx; Codorniú & Gasparini, 2013

Type species
- †Wenupteryx uzi Codorniú & Gasparini, 2013

Genus of pterodactyloid pterosaur from the Late Jurassic

Wenupteryx is an extinct genus of pterodactyloid pterosaur known from the Late Jurassic (Tithonian stage) Vaca Muerta of Neuquén Province, southern Argentina. It was first named by Laura Codorniú and Zulma Gasparini in 2013 and the type species is Wenupteryx uzi. It is a small-sized pterosaur related to the clade Euctenochasmatia or Archaeopterodactyloidea.

== See also ==
- Timeline of pterosaur research
