= Catutosaurus =

Catutosaurus Temporal range: Late Jurassic

Scientific classification
- Kingdom: Animalia
- Phylum: Chordata
- Class: Reptilia
- Superorder: †Ichthyopterygia
- Order: †Ichthyosauria
- Family: †Ophthalmosauridae
- Genus: †Catutosaurus; Fernández et al, 2021

Type species
- Catutosaurus gaspariniae Fernández et al, 2021

Ophthalmosaurid ichthyosaur from the Late Jurassic

Catutosaurus is an ophthalmosaurid ichthyosaur from the Late Jurassic Vaca Muerta Formation of Argentina. It contains a single species, Catutosaurus gaspariniae.

The generic name refers to the Los Catutos site. The specific name honours Zulma Gasparini.

The holotype is MOZ-PV-1854, a skull, lower jaws and front torso. Referred are specimina MOZ-PV-103, a skull with lower jaws, and MOZ-PV-7260, a set of snout fragments.
