= Colangüil Batholith =

Group of plutons in Argentina

The Colangüil Batholith is a group of plutons in western Argentina between the latitudes of 29 and 31° S. The plutons of the batholith were emplaced and cooled in the Late Paleozoic and the Triassic. Runs in a north–south direction. The plutons of the batholith are intruded into volcanic rocks produced by the same plutons plus some earlier deformed basement. The most common rocks in the batholith are granodiorite, granite and leucogranite. The batholith contains also a dyke swarm of north–south trending dykes. Compared to other subduction-related batholiths around the Pacific Ocean Colangüil Batholith is more felsic.

Together with the Chilean Coastal Batholith and the Elqui-Limarí Batholith the Colangüil Batholith is a remnant of the volcanic arcs that erupted the volcanic material of the Choiyoi Group.

The batholith is made up six major units:

- Granodiorita Las Piedritas (made up by five plutons)
- Granito Los Puentes (made up by three plutons)
- Granito Las Opeñas (made up by a single pluton)
- Granito Agua Blanca (made up by two plutons)
- Granito Los Lavaderos (made up by a single pluton)
- Riolita Tres Quebradas (subvolcanic intrusions)

Part of the batholith is thought to be covered by thick sedimentary deposits such as those of Iglesia Basin.
