= Iglesia Basin =

Sedimentary basin in Argentina

- Cuenca de Iglesia
- Location within Argentina
- Coordinates: 30°20′00″S 69°20′00″W
- Etymology: Iglesia
- Region: San Juan Province
- Country: Argentina
- State: Iglesia Department
- Cities: Rodeo

Characteristics
- On/Offshore: Onshore
- Boundaries: Frontal Cordillera, Precordillera

Hydrology
- River: Jáchal

Geology
- Plate: South American
- Orogeny: Andean
- Age: Neogene-Pleistocene

Iglesia Basin (Spanish: Cuenca de Iglesia) is a sedimentary basin located in northern San Juan Province, western Argentina. It is thought to be a piggyback basin. Its sedimentary fill is of Neogene to Pleistocene age and has an estimated maximum thickness of 3.5 km. There are hot springs in the eastern part of the basin. The rock under the sedimentary fill is interpreted to be in part composed of plutonic intrusions belonging to the Tocota pluton, which in turn is a part of a larger group of plutonic intrusions known as the Colangüil Batholith.
