= Nacientes del Teno Formation =

Geologic formation in Chile

- Stratigraphic range: Bajocian–Oxfordian
- Type: Geologic formation

Location
- Region: Maule Region
- Country: Chile

Type section
- Named for: Teno River

Nacientes del Teno Formation (Spanish: Formación Nacientes del Teno) is a geological formation that crops out near the uppermost reaches of Teno River, in the Andes of central Chile. The formation is similar to Nacientes del Biobío Formation further south.
