= Nacientes del Biobío Formation =

Geologic formation in Argentina and Chile

- Stratigraphic range: Pliensbachian–Kimmeridgian
- Type: Geologic formation
- Sub-units: Lonquimay; Lolén-Pacunto; Icalma
- Underlies: Vizcacha-Cumilao Complex
- Overlies: Unknown
- Thickness: >2,450 m (8,040 ft)

Lithology
- Primary: Basaltic lava, sandstone, mudstone, limestone
- Other: Tuff, volcaniclastic breccia, conglomerate

Location
- Coordinates: 38.9°S 71.3°W
- Region: Neuquén Province; Araucanía Region
- Country: Argentina; Chile

Type section
- Named for: Bío Bío River
- Named by: Suárez & Emparan
- Year defined: 1997
- Nacientes del Biobío Formation (Chile)

Nacientes del Biobío Formation (Spanish: Formación Nacientes del Biobío) is a geological formation that crops out near the uppermost reaches of Bío Bío River, in south-central Chile, and nearby areas of Argentina. The formation is made up of basalt and pyroclastic rocks and marine sedimentary rocks, such as sandstone and mudstone. Some less abundant sedimentary lithologies are conglomerate, volcaniclastic sedimentary rock. The formation is intruded by Grupo Plutónico Galletué which is of Late Jurassic to Late Cretaceous age. Further north in Chile the formation is similar to Nacientes del Teno Formation while in Argentina it is similar to Los Molles Formation and Lotena Formation.

== Subdivision ==
Suárez and Emparan have identified three interdigitating members of the formation the older one being Miembro Icalma, the youngest one being Miembro Lonquimay and Miembro Lolén-Pacunto being in-between. The ages of the formation as well of that of the members have been established through fossil ammonite findings.

Miembro Icalma contains basaltic pillow lava and other features indicative of deep marine eruptions. Volcanic rocks, including basalt, belong to the tholeiitic and calc-alkaline series showing geochemical affinities with island arc magmas. Miembro Icalma do also contains marine fossils of Harpoceratinae and Atacamiceras in its sedimentary strata that indicate a Pliensbachian to Mid-Toarcian age for the sub-unit.

Miembro Lolén-Pacunto is made up chiefly of mudstone and sandstone. Miembro Lonquimay stands out for containing limestone and paleochannels filled with sandstone.

== Interpretation ==
The formation is interpreted as indicative of a Jurassic marine regression showing a successive shallowing of deep marine environments (pillow lavas, turbidites) to shallow marine environments (limestone) and culminating with an upper region displaying a continental environment (paleochannels). Tectonically, the formation is assumed to have deposited either in the westernmost fringes of Neuquén Basin or in an intra-arc basin. In both cases the formation must have been deposited very close to a volcanic arc, active in the Jurassic.
