= Coastal Batholith of central Chile =

Igneous rock formation in central Chile

- Stratigraphic range: Pennsylvanian; 322.0–297.6 Ma
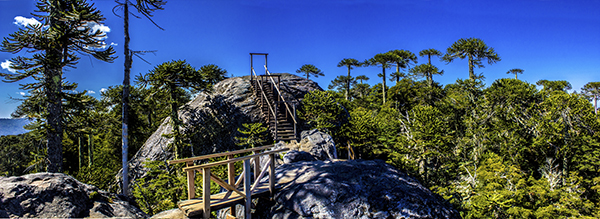
- Araucarias growing on top of rocks of the Coastal Batholith, Cordillera de Nahuelbuta
- Type: Batholith
- Unit of: Central Chile, Andes

Lithology
- Primary: Calc-alkaline magma series

Location
- Location: Chilean Coast Range
- Coordinates: 37°30′S 73°00′W
- Region: Araucanía, Biobío, Los Ríos, Maule, O'Higgins, Santiago Metropolitan & Valparaíso Regions
- Country: Chile
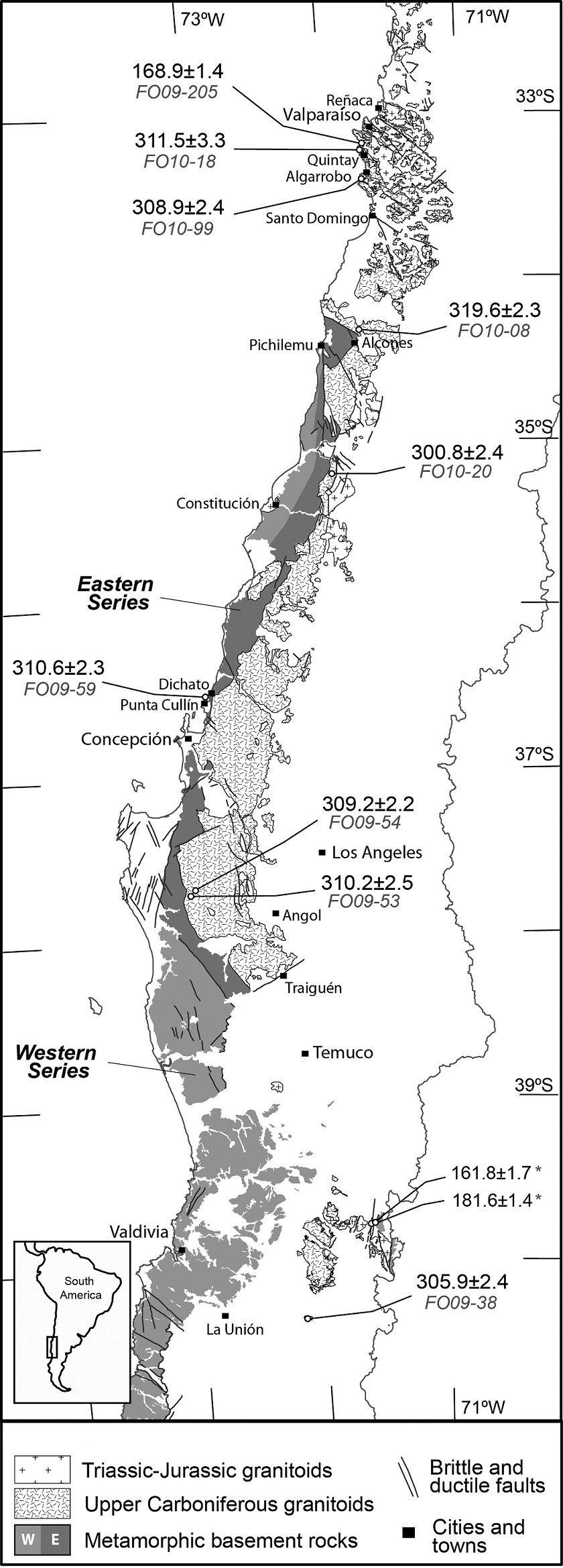
- Geological sketch map of central Chile 33° and 40°S with the Coastal Batholith and rocks of the accretionary metamorphic prism - age data are U-Pb zircon crystallization ages

The Coastal Batholith of central Chile is a group of plutons in the Chilean Coast Range of Central Chile appearing contiguously from 33° S to 38° S. At a latitude of 40° S an outlying group of plutons of the batholith appear in a more eastward position in the Andes.

Together with the Elqui-Limarí Batholith and the Colangüil Batholith, the Coastal Batholith of central Chile is a remnant of the volcanic arcs that erupted the volcanic material of the Choiyoi Group. During the Permian the zone of arc magmatism moved from the Coastal Batholith 350 km inland reaching San Rafael about 280 million years ago. The batholith is emplaced amidst metamorphic rocks belonging to a Paleozoic accretionary complex. The northern parts are of the batholith are themselves intruded by Jurassic gabbros.

Rocks of the batholith belong to the calc-alkaline magma series.
