= Vaca Muerta =

Geologic formation in Argentina

Vaca Muerta Formation
- Stratigraphic range: Tithonian-Berriasian; ~148–140 Ma
- Type: Geological formation
- Unit of: Mendoza Group
- Underlies: Mulichinco Fm., Quintuco Fm., Picún Leufú Fm.
- Overlies: Tordillo Formation
- Thickness: 30–1,200 m (98–3,937 ft)

Lithology
- Primary: Marl
- Other: Organic shale, lime-mudstone

Location
- Coordinates: 38°12′0″S 69°30′0″W
- Region: Neuquén Province
- Country: Argentina
- Extent: >30,000 km^{2} (12,000 sq mi)

Type section
- Named by: Charles E. Weaver
- Location: Salado River valley
- Year defined: 1931
- Country: Argentina
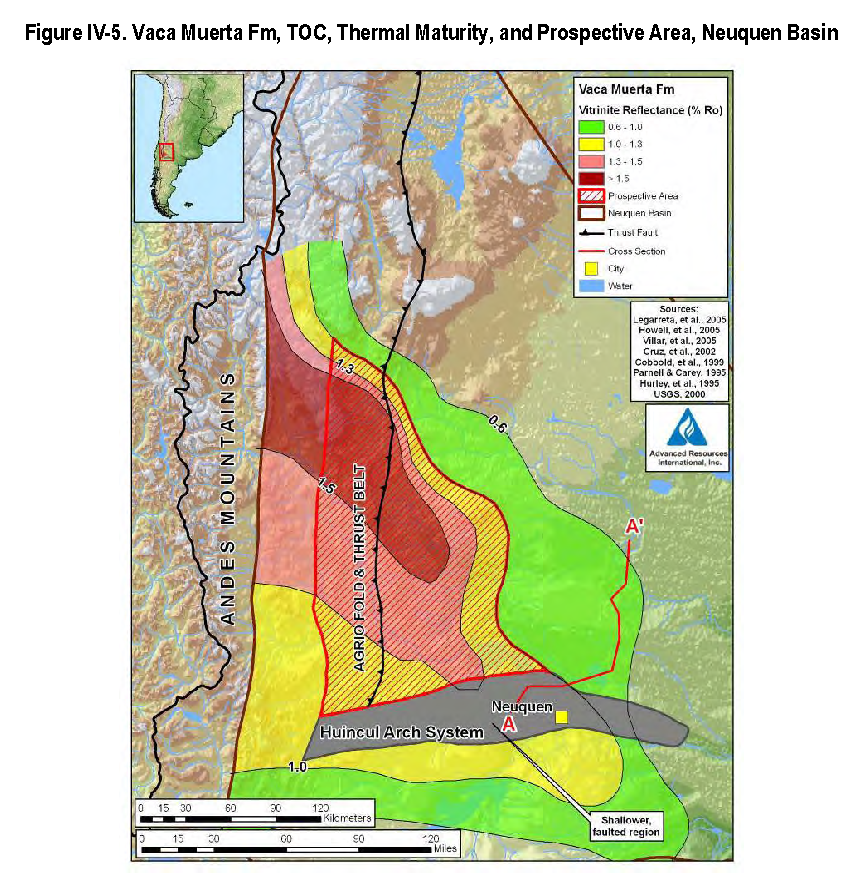
- Hydrocarbon source rock maturity (Ro %) of the Vaca Muerta. Huincul basement high is shown in grey.

The Vaca Muerta Formation, commonly known as Vaca Muerta (Spanish for dead cow), is a geologic formation of Late Jurassic to Early Cretaceous age, located in the Neuquén Basin in northern Patagonia, Argentina. It is well known as the host rock for major deposits of shale oil and shale gas.

The large oil discovery in the Vaca Muerta Formation was made in 2010 by the former Repsol-YPF. The total proven reserves are around 927 million barrels (147.4×10^{6} m^{3}), and as of 2014 YPF's production alone was nearly 45,000 barrels per day (7,200 m^{3}/d). In February 2012, Repsol YPF SA raised its estimate of oil reserves to 22.5 billion barrels (3.58×10^{9} m^{3}). The US EIA estimates total recoverable hydrocarbons from this Vaca Muerta Formation to be 16.2 billion barrels (2.58×10^{9} m^{3}) of oil and 308 trillion cubic feet (8.7×10^{12} m^{3}) of natural gas, more than even the Neuquén Basin's hydrocarbon-rich Middle Jurassic Los Molles Formation holds. As of 2017, there were almost 500 fracking wells, one of the most fracked sites outside North America, and as of October 2024, there were over 1500 fracking wells.

In July 2013, protests were heavily repressed by the police. The huge water consumption of fracking as well as the sand mines interfere with agriculture. In 2018, the Mapuche sued Exxon, French company TotalEnergies and Pan American Energy for "dangerous waste" due to "deficient treatment" close to the town of Añelo as oily sludge residue from fracking was tipped in illegal waste dumps.

The formation is also known for its fossils, such as those of marine reptiles.

== Geography ==
The Vaca Muerta Formation, commonly known as Vaca Muerta (Spanish for Dead Cow), is a geologic formation of Late Jurassic to Early Cretaceous age, located in the Neuquén Basin in northern Patagonia, Argentina. Waste from the oil exploitation since 2011 has been deposited close to the town of Añelo, which is about 1,200km west of Buenos Aires.

== Geology ==
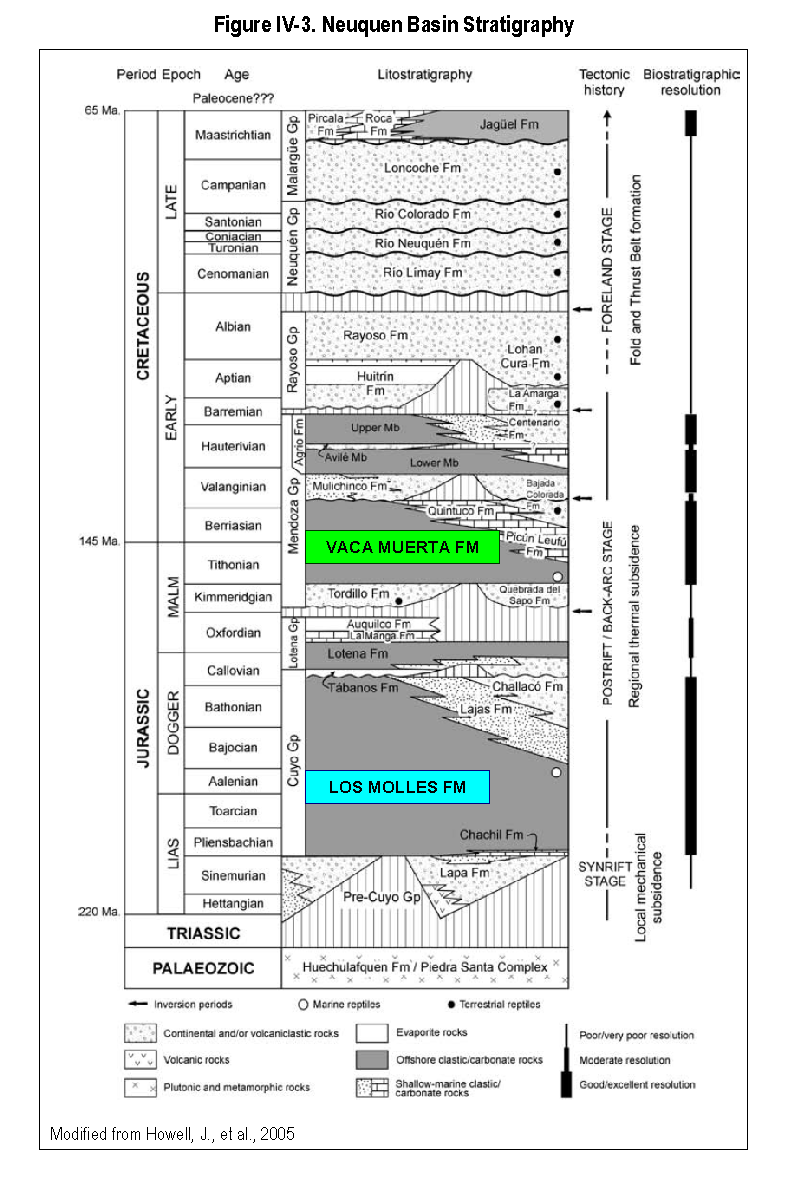
Stratigraphy of the Vaca Muerta Formation

The Vaca Muerta Shale is a continuous tight oil and shale gas reservoir of Late Jurassic (Tithonian) and Early Cretaceous (Berriasian) age. The formation covers a total area of 30,000 square kilometres (12,000 sq mi). The shale is at a depth of about 9,500 feet (2,900 m), where it has been found productive of oil and gas. Although called a shale, and with a total organic carbon content varying from 1 percent to 5 percent, the Vaca Muerta is predominately marl and consists of mature black shales, marls and lime mudstones. Formed in a marine environment with little clay and brittle rock, the deposit is 30 to 1,200 metres (98 to 3,937 ft) (usually over 400 metres (1,300 ft)) thick, extending throughout the basin. At the time of deposition, the Vaca Muerta was situated on the eastern margin of the Pacific Ocean.

Although the name Vaca Muerta Formation was introduced to the geological literature in 1931 by American geologist Charles E. Weaver, the highly bituminous shales in the Salado River valley in southern Mendoza were described in 1892 by Dr. Guillermo Bodenbender. German paleontologists Beherendsen and Steuer determined the Tithonian age of these shales. In several outcrop locations, the Vaca Muerta Formation has been the site of paleontological finds: the crocodylomorph Cricosaurus and possibly Geosaurus, the ichthyosaur Caypullisaurus, and the pterosaurs Herbstosaurus and Wenupteryx.

The Vaca Muerta Formation represents the most distal facies of the Lower Mendoza Mesosequence, a Tithonian–Valanginian broad shallowing-upward sedimentary cycle. In the southern part of the Neuquén Basin the Lower Mendoza Mesosequence includes the basinal deposits of the Vaca Muerta Formation (early to middle Tithonian), which to the south-southeast change to mixed carbonate-siliciclastic nearshore deposits of the Carrin Cura Formation (lower part of the middle Tithonian) and Picún Leufú Formation (middle Tithonian – lower Berriasian), and to continental deposits of the Bajada Colorada Formation of Tithonian – Berriasian age. In the central part of the Neuquén Basin, also known as Neuquén embayment, the Lower Mendoza Mesosequence consists of basinal deposits of the Vaca Muerta Formation (early to upper Tithonian), which to the east change to shoreface deposits of the Quintuco Formation (upper Tithonian – lower Valanginian), and to sabkha deposits of the Loma Montosa Formation (lower Valanginian), forming a mixed carbonate-siliciclastic depositional system. Westward the Vaca Muerta Formation includes slope facies (Huncal Member), and in the Chilean territory pass into shallow marine/volcanic deposits. By contrast, in the southern Mendoza area the Lower Mendoza Mesosequence consists of aggradational and divergent sequences, with a maximum thickness of 500 metres (1,600 ft) towards the center of the basin. It includes basinal to middle carbonate ramp deposits of the Vaca Muerta Formation (early Tithonian – early Valanginian) and middle to inner ramp oyster-deposits of the Chachao Formation (early Valanginian), which form an homoclinal carbonate ramp system. Westward, undated tidal to continental mixed deposits have been recognized and correlated with the Vaca Muerta and Chachao Formations, receiving the name of Lindero de Piedra Formation.

== Paleobiota ==
Color key: Taxon / Reclassified taxon / Taxon falsely reported as present / Dubious taxon or junior synonym / Ichnotaxon / Ootaxon / Morphotaxon

Notes
Uncertain or tentative taxa are in small text
~~crossed out~~ taxa are discredited.

=== Vertebrates ===
==== Plesiosaurs ====
Plesiosaurs from the Vaca Muerta Formation
Genus	Species	Location	Member	Material	Notes	Images
Liopleurodon	L. sp.				A thalassophonean pliosaurid The specimen from Vaca Muerta was very large, with a skull length of 2.1–2.5 metres (6.9–8.2 ft).	
Pliosaurus	P. patagonicus				A large thalassophonean pliosaurid	
Pliosaurus	P. almanzaensis				A large thalassophonean pliosaurid	

==== Ichthyosaurs ====
Ichthyosaurs from the Vaca Muerta Formation
Genus	Species	Location	Member	Material	Notes	Images
Arthropterygius	A. thalassonotus				An ophthalmosaurid ichthyosaur	
Catutosaurus	C. gaspariniae				An ophthalmosaurid ichthyosaur	
Caypullisaurus	C. bonapartei				A platypterygiine ophthalmosaurid	
Ophthalmosaurus	O. sp.				An ophthalmosaurid ichthyosaur	
Sumpalla	S. argentina				A platypterygiine ophthalmosaurid	
Eternauta	E. patagonica				A platypterygiine ophthalmosaurid	

==== Pseudosuchians ====
Pseudosuchians from the Vaca Muerta Formation
Genus	Species	Location	Member	Material	Notes	Images
Cricosaurus	C. araucanensis				A metriorhynchine metriorhynchid	
Cricosaurus	C. lithographicus				A metriorhynchine metriorhynchid	
Cricosaurus	C. puelchorum				A metriorhynchine metriorhynchid	
Dakosaurus	D. andiniensis				A geosaurine metriorhynchid	
Purranisaurus	P. potens				A geosaurine metriorhynchid	

==== Pterosaurs ====
Pterosaurs from the Vaca Muerta Formation
Genus	Species	Location	Member	Material	Notes	Images
Herbstosaurus	H. pigmaeus			Partial skeleton	A pterodactyloid pterosaur	
Wenupteryx	W. uzi			Partial skeleton of a subadult individual, referred incomplete ulna	Pterodactyloid pterosaur with affinities to Archaeopterodactyloidea	
Pterodactyloidea	Indeterminate			Tibiotarsus	Estimated wingspan of over 3 metres, represents a distinct taxon from named species due to size differences.	

==== Turtles ====
Turtles of the Vaca Muerta
Genus	Species	Location	Member	Material	Notes	Images
Neusticemys	N. neuquina				A thalassochydian sea-turtle	
Notoemys	N. laticentralis				A platychelid turtle	

==== Fish ====
Fishes of the Vaca Muerta
Genus	Species	Location	Member	Material	Notes	Images
Bunoderma	B. baini				A ray-finned fish	
Catutoichthys	C. olsacheri				A caturid amiiform	
Jonoichthys	J. challwa				A aspidorhynchid fish	
Leedsichthys	L. problematicus				A pachycormid fish	
Leptolepis	L. australis				A leptolepid fish	
Leptolepis	L. dubius				A leptolepid fish	
Notodectes	N. argentinus				A pachycormiform fish	
Pholidophorus	P. argentinus				A pholidophrorid fish	

=== Invertebrates ===
==== Cephalopods ====
Cephalopods from the Vaca Muerta Formation
Genus	Species	Location	Member	Material	Notes	Images
Argentiniceras	A. noduliferum					
Aspidoceras	A. euomphalum					
Blanfordiceras	B. cf. wallichi					
Catutosphinctes	C. sp. A					
Catutosphinctes	C. guenenakenensis					
Catutosphinctes	C. cf. proximus					
Catutosphinctes	C. rafaeli					
Corongoceras	C. alternans					
Corongoceras	C. mendozanum					
Cieneguiticeras	C. perlaevi					
Himalayites	H. cf. andinus					
Indansites	I. picunleufuense					
Karakaschiceras	K. attenuatus					
Leonardia	L. almanzaensis					
Leonardia	L. steinmanni					
Lissonia	L. riveroi					
Mazatepites	M. arredondense					
Olcostephanus	O. atherstoni					
Physodoceras	P. sp. A					
Pseudhimalayites	P. subpretiosus					
Pseudolissoceras	P. zitteli					
Windhauseniceras	W. internispinosum					

== Oil and gas exploration and production timeline ==
Vaca Muerta
- Location within Argentina
- Country: Argentina
- Region: Neuquén Province
- Offshore/onshore: Onshore
- Coordinates: 38°12′0″S 69°30′0″W
- Operator: YPF

Field history
- Start of development: 2011
- Start of production: 2011

Production
- Current production of oil: 45,000 barrels per day (~2.2×10^{6} t/a)
- Estimated oil in place: 126 million tonnes (~ 147×10^{6} m^{3} or 927 million bbl)
- Producing formations: Vaca Muerta

The Vaca Muerta Shale had long been known as a major petroleum source rock for other formations in the Neuquén Basin, which has had oil production since 1918. Wells producing from the Vaca Muerta itself are in several oil fields, including the Loma La Lata, Loma Lata Norte, and Loma Campana fields.

=== 2008–2013 ===
Given the natural decline in gas production and diminishing returns from conventional exploration activity, in 2008 Repsol-YPF executive Tomas Garcia Blanco sponsored the search for "unconventional" shale gas. The initiative included forming an exploration team under the leadership of Mikel Erquiaga, with Germán Bottessi heading the team searching for gas. M. di Benedetto was added to the team once the oil potential was fully identified. A budget and resources were assigned to the team, and Welsh engineer R. Ll. Lolley was appointed engineering advisor.

This team screened all Argentine source rock formations and proposed Vaca Muerta as principal objective because logistics were easier and it held greater potential.

Target well locatíons were selected in most of the exploration and production leases. A policy of systematically testing the wells after they had been stimulated was adopted with wells in the Loma La Lata/ Loma Campana area being tied into existing production facilities. By March 2012 data was available from over 25 stimulated wells. The D-129 source rock had also started to be explored had tested positive.

As part of the visualization the logistics required to develop the assets were investigated with the need for importation of drilling rigs and fracturing equipment being identified together with an opportunity for ín-country proppant sand production. The critical path was however the availability of heavy motor mechanics.

In July 2010, Repsol-YPF recognized the productive potential of the Vaca Muerta Shale of the Neuquén Basin, and completed Argentina's first shale gas well at the Loma La Lata field. In November 2010, the company completed a tight oil well in the Vaca Muerta Shale in the Loma Campana area. In August 2011, the first horizontal well in the Vaca Muerta was drilled and completed. By October 2012, 31 wells had been drilled and completed, and another 20 had been drilled and were awaiting completion. The drilling had extended the Vaca Muerta producing extent to an area of at least 300 square kilometres (120 sq mi).

As of 2011, the total proven reserves were around 927 million barrels (147.4×10^{6} m^{3}), and as of 2014 YPF's production alone was nearly 45,000 barrels per day (7,200 m^{3}/d). In February 2012, Repsol YPF SA raised its estimate of oil reserves to 22.5 billion barrels (3.58×10^{9} m^{3}). The US EIA estimated in 2013 total recoverable hydrocarbons from Vaca Muerta Formation to be 16.2 billion barrels (2.58×10^{9} m^{3}) of oil and 308 trillion cubic feet (8.7×10^{12} m^{3}) of natural gas, more than even the Neuquén Basin's hydrocarbon-rich Middle Jurassic Los Molles Formation holds.

One problem in attracting development was Argentina's price controls on natural gas, keeping the price down to US$2.00-$2.50 per million BTU. However, the government exempted tight gas from controls, and in 2011 the Vaca Muerta gas was selling for US$4–$7. The higher gas prices attracted major oil companies, including ExxonMobil, Total S.A., and Chevron Corporation to Vaca Muerta.

In May 2013, YPF announced that it had negotiated a joint venture in which Chevron Corporation would invest US$1.5 billion drilling 132 wells on the Loma Campana field. Chevron's participation was complicated by efforts by the plaintiffs who obtained a judgement in Ecuador with respect to actions by Texaco in the Lago Agrio oil field to collect the judgement from Chevron's Argentine assets. On September 24, 2013, YPF announced that Dow Chemical Company subsidiary Dow Argentina had signed an agreement to drill 16 natural gas wells in the El Orejano block of the Vaca Muerta formation over a 12-month period, with Dow contributing US$120,000,000 and YPF US$68,000,000. Shell Argentina CEO Juan José Aranguren was quoted on December 10, 2013, as saying his company, with 4 producing wells in Vaca Muerta and 2 more drilling, would triple capital spending in Argentine shale to "about" US$500 million in 2014 from US$170 million in 2013. Luis Sapag, of the Sapag family which has dominated Neuquén politics for half a century, was reported by Bloomberg in December 2013 as saying that the YPF-Chevron joint venture would invest as much as US$16 billion if the US$1.2 billion pilot venture was successful by March 2014, which would generate almost US$9 billion in royalties for Neuquén.

=== Developments in 2014 ===
In February 2014, Archer Ltd. announced it had an "approximately US$400 million" contract with YPF to provide "five new built drilling rigs to support YPF's development of unconventional shale resources in the Neuquén area in Argentina." On February 18 of the same year, YPF announced that it had signed a memorandum of understanding with Petronas on a possible investment (agreed upon in the following August; see below) in the 187 square kilometer Amarga Chica zone of the Vaca Muerta formation; YPF also indicated that its current production in Vaca Muerta was over 20,000 barrels of oil equivalent a day from over 150 fracked wells using 19 fracking drill rigs. Helmerich & Payne disclosed on March 5, 2014, that it had contracted with YPF to deploy 10 drill rigs under five-year contracts from the United States to Argentina between the third quarter of 2014 and the first quarter of 2015 to work in the Vaca Muerta play in addition to the nine rigs Helmerich & Payne already had in the country. On April 10, 2014, Miguel Gallucio of YPF announced that Chevron had decided to continue its partnership with YPF in the "massive development" of Vaca Muerta; the US$1.24 billion pilot program financed by Chevron and ended in March had developed 161 fracked wells in a 20 square kilometer area. The new phase would frack 170 additional wells that year with a joint investment of over US$1.6 billion, with YPF continuing as operator. The goal agreed upon for future years would be to develop an area of 395 square kilometers with over 1500 fracked wells producing over 50,000 barrels of oil and 3 million cubic meters (over 100 million cubic feet) of natural gas a day. Chevron and YPF also agreed on a US$140,000,000, four-year exploration project to drill and analyze 7 vertical and 2 horizontal wells in a 200 square kilometer area (Narambuena) in the Chihuido de la Sierra Negra concession, to be financed by Chevron with YPF as operator. In an interview with the Argentine newspaper La Nación published September 14, 2014, Gallucio indicated that production in the Loma Campana field had reached 31,000 barrels of oil equivalent a day.

On October 8, 2014, Argentine Industry Minister Débora Georgi reported that YPF had signed a confidential agreement in principle with Gazprom that could lead to a US$1 billion investment in gas exploration and production "in Argentina".

=== 2015-present ===
In January 2015 YPF and Sinopec signed a memorandum of understanding for future cooperation in both conventional and unconventional petroleum development; they indicated that Sinopec Argentina Exploration and Production S.A. was already doing due diligence on exploration and development in "certain areas" of Vaca Muerta together with YPF. In January 2015 YPF indicated that it and Chevron had invested over US$3 billion in their Loma Campana venture, which YPF described as the most important unconventional oil project in the world outside the United States.

In April 2015, Gallucio stated that production in the Loma Campana field had reached 44,000-45,000 barrels of oil equivalent a day. In April 2015, YPF signed a memorandum on cooperation with Gazprom, though it had previously denied the report. As of May 2015, more than 30 oil and gas companies were active in Vaca Muerta. In June 2015, YPF announced a new discovery in Vaca Muerta, this time in the La Ribera I block, with an initial output of 43,000 cubic meters (over 1.5 million cubic feet) of gas a day. In November 2015, YPF indicated that production from Vaca Muerta was 54,000 barrels of oil equivalent daily, with 47,000 from Loma Campana; it also indicated that Chevron had invested US$2,500,000,000 over the last two years. YPF showed production for the third quarter of 2016 at 58,200 barrels of oil equivalent daily from 522 wells, with 11 rigs working.

In September 2016, after the change of government in Argentina, YPF said that proposed new rates for gas would permit the continued development of gas in Vaca Muerta.

As of 2017, there were almost 500 fracking wells, one of the most fracked sites outside North America.

By May 2024, the price of Vaca Muerta gas was US$5 per million BTU, half of the price of the imported LNG shipped from Brazil to LNG Escobar, and less than a third of the price of diesel. The Néstor Kirchner gas pipeline was partially operational.

As of October 2024, there were over 1500 fracking wells and local infrastructure was stressed. The massive oil production produced an energy trade surplus for the first time since production began in 2012. An investment of $1.2 billion in the Rincón de Aranda field was planned to further increase oil production. Gas cannot yet be exported as there are no large scale plants to turn it into LNG and no pipelines, however liquefaction ship Hilli Episeyo is scheduled to export 11 million cubic meters per day from Las Grutas by 2027 or 2028. Further stages may export from Punta Colorada, Río Negro.

== Blocks and financing ==
As of 2013 Vaca Muerta was divided into different development blocks. Consortium of YPF (50%) and Chevron (50%) develops General Enrique Mosconi concession, including Loma La Lata Norte and Loma Campana fields. Consortium of Petrobras (55%, operator) and Total S.A. (45%) develops the Rincon de Aranda concession. The Los Toldos blocks are developed by the consortium of Americas Petrogas (45%, operator of the blocks), ExxonMobil (45%) and Gas y Petroleo del Neuquén (10%). Consortium of Shell (65%, operator) Medanito (25%) and Gas y Petroleo del Neuquén (10%) develops Águila Mora and Sierras Blancas areas. Consortium of Wintershall (50%, operator) and Gas y Petroleo del Neuquén (50%) develops the Aguada Federal block. Apache Corporation was active in the Vaca Muerta in 2012–2013, but agreed to sell all its Argentine assets to YPF for US$800 million in an agreement signed February 12, 2014. The Bandurria block was formerly a joint venture of Pan American Energy, YPF, and Wintershall; it has now been split into three blocks, with Wintershall as operator of Bandurria Norte, Pan American Energy as operator of Bandurria Centro, and YPF as operator of Bandurria Sur. YPF indicated in July 2015 that it planned to drill 20 wells in Bandurria Sur with the goal of beginning shale oil production within three years at a cost of US$282.2 million. ExxonMobil is the operator of the Bajo del Choique and La Invernada blocks and has an 85% working interest in them, with Gas y Petroleo del Neuquén holding the remaining 15%; they announced their first discovery on the former block in May 2014, and their first discovery on the latter in the following December. YPF and Petronas signed an agreement on August 28, 2014, whereby Petronas would receive a 50% interest together with YPF in return for contributing US$475 million as part of a three-year, US$550 million, pilot project of development in the Amarga Chica block, with YPF as operator. In November 2016, YPF and Petronas announced that they had spent US$165 million drilling 9 wells in the initial phase of Amarga Chica development, and that they had agreed to move to a second stage where they would spend another US$192.5 million on drilling 10 horizontal wells and constructing surface facilities. The El Orejano block, which (as mentioned above) YPF and Dow Argentina agreed to develop in 2013, was producing 750,000 cubic meters of shale gas (nearly 26 1/2 million cubic feet) daily from a total of 19 wells by December 2015; Dow and YPF agreed to invest another US$500 million in 2016 on top of the US$350 million already invested, and drill 30 more wells in order to triple that output. In January 2016, Aubrey McClendon's American Energy Partners, LP, and YPF announced a preliminary agreement for the development of two more blocks, at a cost of over US$500 million in the next three years: Bajada de Añelo and the southern zone of Cerro Arena, the latter together with Pluspetrol and Gas y Petróleo del Neuquén; an affiliate of American Energy Partners would acquire up to a 50% participation in both. Also Madalena Ventures, Azabache, and Tecpetrol participate in exploration and production.

As of April 2022, the following banks financed operations in Vaca Muerta: Citibank, Credit Suisse, Deutsche Bank, Goldman Sachs, HSBC, ING, Industrial and Commercial Bank of China (ICBC) and Morgan Stanley. Both IBD and World Bank have funded massive urban planning projects in Añelo city.

== Human right violations and environmental impacts ==
In July 2013, protests against the ratification of the YPF-Chevron US$16 billion agreement to exploit the Loma Campana concession were heavily repressed by the police. Each oil well demands 640 water trucks, the equivalent of nine Olympic-size pools, over the lifetime of the well. Other environmental externalities include the clash of sand mines with agriculture in the town of Dolavon, Chubut province.

In 2018, the Mapuche were suing Exxon, French company TotalEnergies and Pan American Energy for "dangerous waste" due to "deficient treatment" close to the town of Añelo as oily sludge residue from fracking was tipped in illegal waste dumps.

== See also ==
- Choiyoi Group
- Los Molles Formation
