= San Rafael Block =

Argentina's 200 kilometers geographic and tectonic unit

The San Rafael Block or San Rafael Massif (Spanish: Bloque de San Rafael or Macizo de San Rafael) is an uplifted area in central Mendoza Province, Argentina. The San Rafael Block is both a geographic and a tectonic unit. From a tectonostratigraphic view, some geologists consider it an exposure of the Cuyania (Precordillera) terrane being its southern extension. The San Rafael Block crops out 200 kilometres (120 mi) to the south of the other exposures of Cuyania. The San Rafael Block forms the northeastern boundary of the Neuquén Basin.

== See also ==
- North Patagonian Massif
- Reserva Provincial La Payunia
- San Rafael orogeny
