= Notoemys =

Notoemys Temporal range: Oxfordian–Valanginian

Scientific classification
- Domain: Eukaryota
- Kingdom: Animalia
- Phylum: Chordata
- Class: Reptilia
- Order: Testudines
- Family: †Platychelyidae
- Genus: †Notoemys; Cattoi and Freiburg, 1961

Species
- See text

Synonyms
- Caribemys De la Fuente & Iturralde-Vinent, 2001

Extinct genus of turtles

Notoemys is an extinct genus of platychelyid turtle known from the Late Jurassic and Early Cretaceous of the Americas.

== Species ==
- Notoemys laticentralis Cattoi and Freiburg, 1961 Vaca Muerta, Argentina, Late Jurassic (Tithonian)
- Notoemys oxfordiensis (de la Fuente and Iturralde-Vinent 2001) Jagua Formation, Cuba, Late Jurassic (Oxfordian) (originally Caribemys oxfordiensis)
- Notoemys tlaxiacoensis Lopez-Conde et al. 2017 Sabinal Formation, Mexico, Late Jurassic (Kimmeridgian)
- Notoemys zapatocaensis Cadena, 2005 Rosablanca Formation, Colombia, Early Cretaceous (Valanginian)
