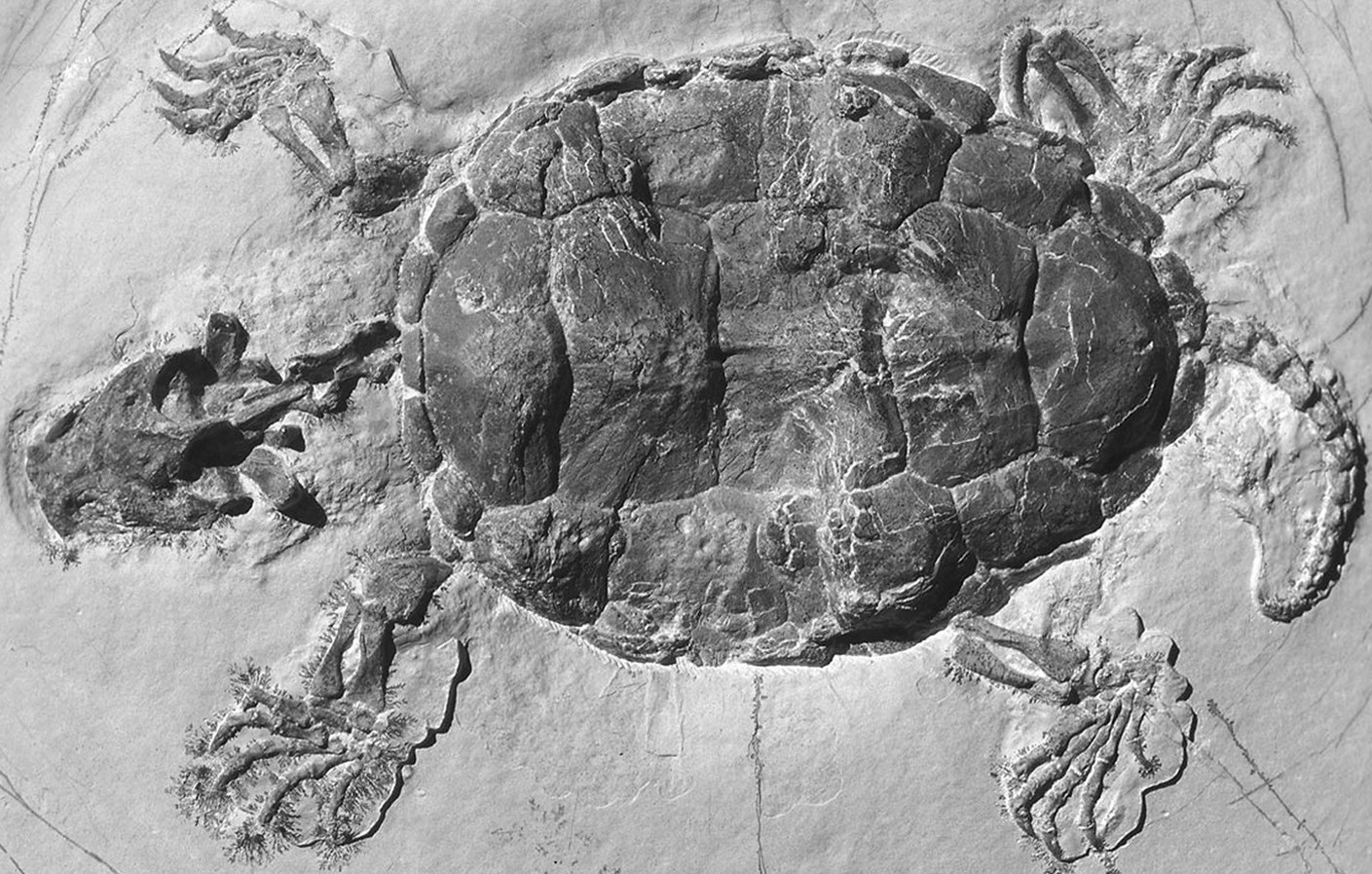
- Platychelys oberndorferi

Scientific classification
- Kingdom: Animalia
- Phylum: Chordata
- Order: Testudines
- Clade: Pan-Pleurodira
- Family: †Platychelyidae; Bräm, 1965

Genera
- Platychelys Wagner, 1853; Notoemys Cattoi and Freiburg, 1961

= Platychelyidae =

Platychelyidae Temporal range: Oxfordian–Valanginian

Extinct family of turtles

Platychelyidae is an extinct family of pan-pleurodiran turtles, known from the Late Jurassic and Early Cretaceous of Europe, South America, North America, and the Caribbean. It represents the oldest known clade of stem-pleurodires. All known members have been found in marine or coastal deposits. Despite this, their limb morphology suggests that they were not adapted for open marine conditions, but were likely inhabitants of shallow water environments, including brackish and saline waters, and they likely never inhabited environments more marine than lagoons. Their tolerance for saline environments likely aided their dispersal during the breakup of Pangea. Unlike modern pleurodires, which retract their necks to the sides, Platychelys retracted its neck inwards, similar to modern cryptodire turtles. Platychelys is strongly morphologically similar to mata mata and snapping turtles, suggesting that it had a similar ecology as a ram or suction feeder.

== Genera ==
After

- Platychelys Wagner, 1853
  - Platychelys oberndorferi Wagner, 1853 Reuchenette Formation, Switzerland, Late Jurassic (Kimmeridgian), Solnhofen Limestone, Germany, Late Jurassic (Tithonian)
- Notoemys Cattoi and Freiburg, 1961 (syn Caribemys de la Fuente & Iturralde-Vinent, 2001)
  - Notoemys laticentralis Cattoi and Freiburg, 1961 Vaca Muerta, Argentina, Late Jurassic (Tithonian)
  - Notoemys oxfordiensis (de la Fuente and Iturralde-Vinent 2001) Jagua Formation, Cuba, Late Jurassic (Oxfordian)
  - Notoemys tlaxiacoensis Lopez-Conde et al. 2017 Sabinal Formation, Mexico, Late Jurassic (Kimmeridgian)
  - Notoemys zapatocaensis Cadena, 2005 Rosablanca Formation, Colombia, Early Cretaceous (Valanginian)
