= Neuquén Basin =

Sedimentary basin covering most of Neuquén Province in Argentina

- Cuenca Neuquina
- Location within Argentina

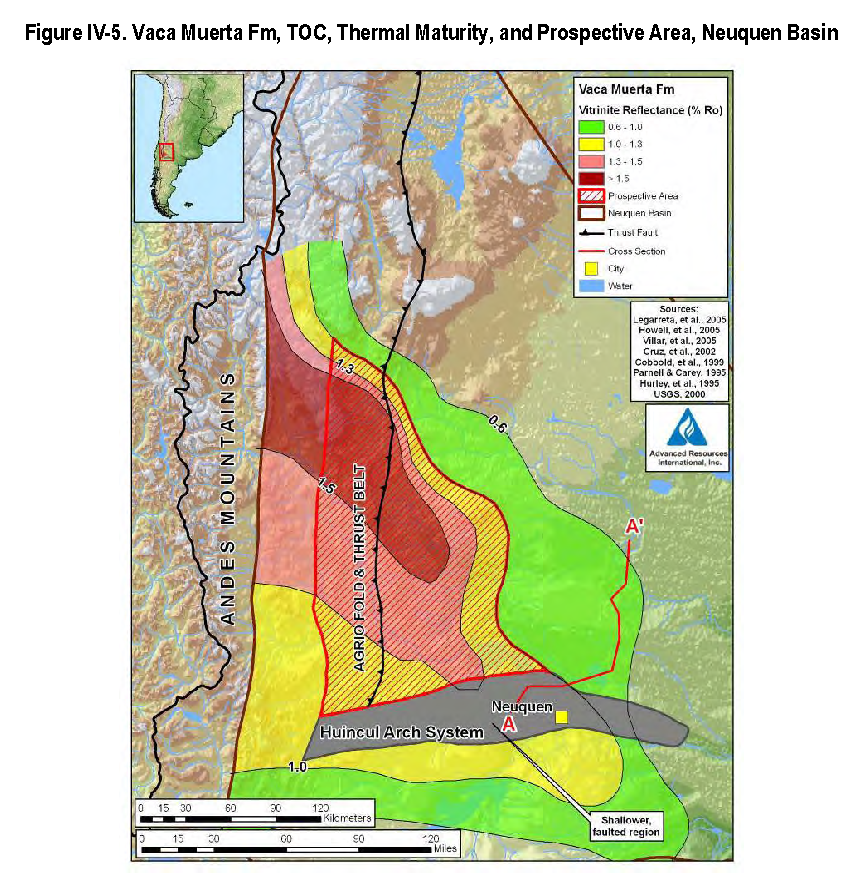
- Map of Vaca Muerta showing the extent of the Neuquén Basin. Colors indicate hydrocarbon maturity as measured by vitrinite reflectance. Huincul Fault is shown in grey.
- Coordinates: 38°14′S 69°16′W
- Etymology: Neuquén River
- Location: Southern South America
- Country: Argentina; Chile
- States: Mendoza, Río Negro, La Pampa, & Neuquén Provinces; Araucanía & Bío Bío Regions
- Cities: Neuquén, Bariloche

Characteristics
- On/Offshore: Onshore
- Boundaries: Andean Volcanic Belt (W); San Rafael Block (NE); Sierra Pintada (E); North Patagonian Massif (SE)
- Part of: Andean foreland basins
- Area: 120,000 km^{2} (46,000 sq mi)

Hydrology
- Rivers: Río Negro, Colorado, Limay, Collón Curá & Neuquén Rivers
- Lakes: Ezquiel Ramos Mexía, Los Barreales & Mari Menuco Reservoirs

Geology
- Basin type: Foreland basin
- Plate: South American
- Orogeny: Andean
- Age: Triassic-Holocene
- Stratigraphy: Stratigraphy
- Faults: Huincul
- Field: a.o. Vaca Muerta (unconventional oil)

Neuquén Basin (Spanish: Cuenca Neuquina) is a sedimentary basin covering most of Neuquén Province in Argentina. The basin originated in the Jurassic and developed through alternating continental and marine conditions well into the Tertiary. The basin bounds to the west with the Andean Volcanic Belt, to the southeast with the North Patagonian Massif and to the northeast with the San Rafael Block and to the east with the Sierra Pintada System. The basin covers an area of approximately 120,000 square kilometres (46,000 sq mi). One age of the SALMA classification, the Colloncuran, is defined in the basin, based on the Collón Curá Formation, named after the Collón Curá River, a tributary of the Limay River.

== Description ==
Jurassic and Cretaceous marine transgressions from the Pacific are recorded in the sediments of Neuquén Basin. These marine sediments belong to Cuyo Group, Tordillo Formation, Auquilco Formation and Vaca Muerta. In the Late Cretaceous, conditions in the neighboring Andean orogeny changed. A marine regression occurred and the fold and thrust belts of Malargüe (36°00 S), Chos Malal (37° S) and Agrio (38° S) started to develop in the Andes and did so until Eocene times. This meant an advance of the Andean orogenic deformation since the Late Cretaceous that made the western part of Neuquén Basin to stack in the Malargüe and Agrio fold and thrust belts. This caused a shift in deposition from Pacific to Early Atlantic.

In the south of Mendoza Province, the Guañacos fold and thrust belt (36.5° S) appeared and grew in the Pliocene and Pleistocene consuming the western fringes of the Neuquén Basin.

=== Tectonics ===
The Huincul basement high or Huincul ridge (Spanish: dorsal de Huincul) is a geological structure that divides Neuquén Basin in two parts. The basement high is one of the most studied features of Neuquén Basin given its importance for hydrocarbon exploration and exploitation. All over the basement high runs an approximate length of 250 kilometres (160 mi). There have been proposals on the nature of this structure. In the 1970s and 1980s it was proposed by that it was a transpressive fault zone. In 2009, Pángaro described it as being made up of inverted half-grabens.

Unconformities have been registered in the basin and were dated at 98, 117, 123, 129, 134 and 154 Ma.

=== Stratigraphy ===
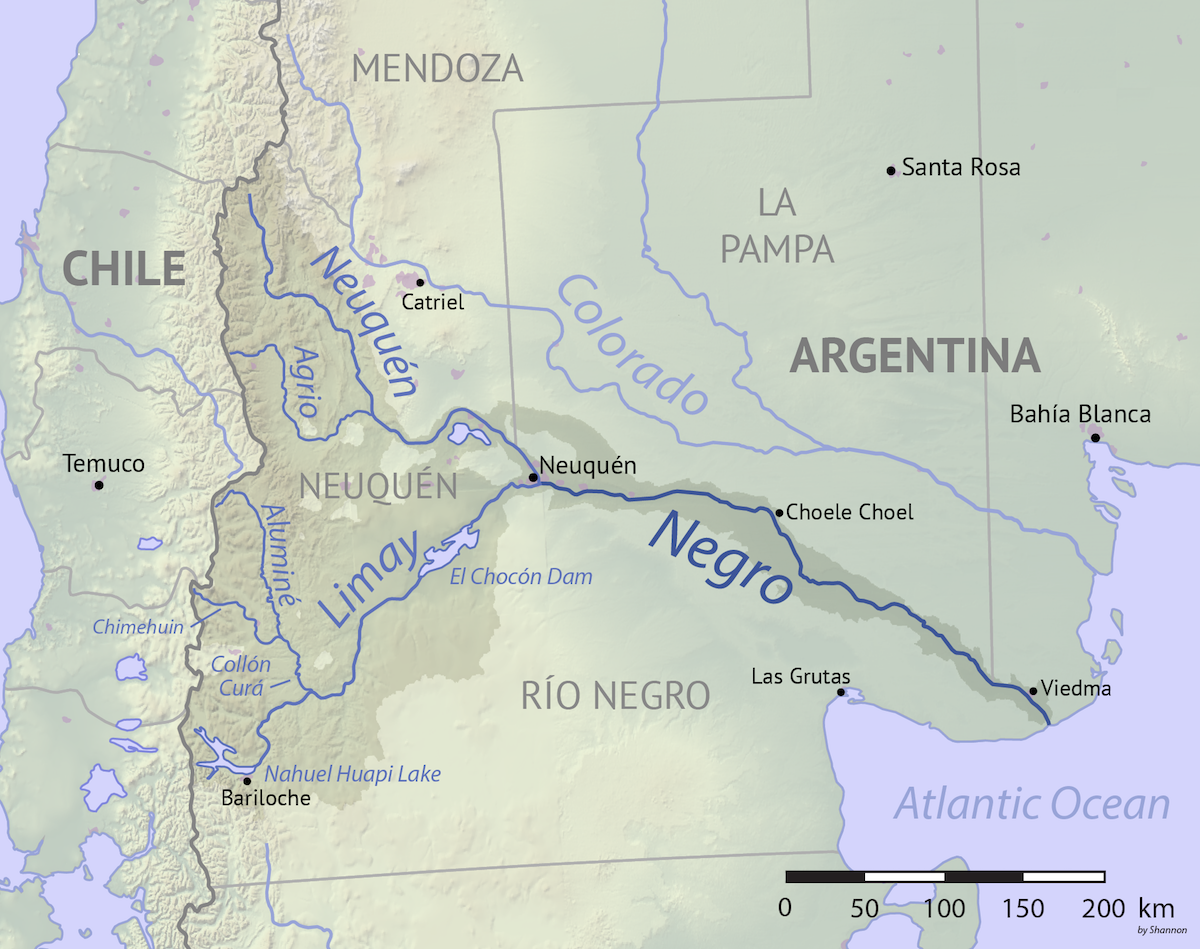
Map of the Río Negro watershed. The Neuquén Basin comprises the upper course of the Río Negro, stretching towards the Colorado River in the north and to the Limay River in the south. Various stratigraphic units are named after these rivers and their tributaries.

The basin contains many stratigraphic units from the Triassic onwards, with large regional variations from east to west and north to south, often described as different formations that are laterally equivalent, this list is a comprehensive overview of described formations:

Cenozoic

- Tromen Formation (Holocene)
- Cerro Campanario Formation (Late Pleistocene-Holocene)
- El Puente Formation (Middle Pleistocene)
- Chapúa Formation (Early Pleistocene)
- Agua de la Caldera Formation (Pleistocene)
- El Sauzal Formation (Pleistocene)
- Coyocho Formation (Middle Miocene-Early Pleistocene)
- Bayo Mesa Formation (Late Pliocene to Pleistocene)
- Los Pinos Formation (Late Pliocene)
- Pampa Encima Formation (Late Pliocene)
- Chenqueniyeu Formation (Pliocene)
- Chapelcó Formation (Pliocene)
- Rincón Bayo Formation (Middle Pliocene)
- Chos Malal-Trahalhué Formation (Late Miocene-Early Pliocene)
- El Palo Formation (Late Miocene to Early Pliocene)
- Arroyo Palao Formation (Late Miocene)
- Tristeza Formation (Late Miocene)
- Río Negro Formation or Caleufú Formation (Middle to Late Miocene)
- Barranca de los Loros Formation (Late Miocene-Early Pliocene)
- Collón Cura Formation (Colloncuran)
- Cerro Bandera Formation (Colhuehuapian)
- Chichinales Formation (Colhuehuapian)
- Vaca Mahuida Formation (Late Oligocene to Middle Miocene)
- Sierra Negra Formation (Oligocene-Early Miocene)
- Palauco Formation (Oligocene)
- Lolog Formation (Late Eocene)
- Colpilli Formation (Eocene)
- Cayanta Formation (Eocene)
- Ventana Formation (Lutetian, early Mustersan)
- Huitrera Formation (Paleocene to Oligocene)

Mesozoic

- Malargüe Group
  - Agua de la Piedra Formation (Deseadan to Early Miocene) (Note: Some authors include the Agua de la Piedra Formation within the Malargüe Group, others do not)
  - Pircala Formation (Paleocene)
  - Coihueco Formation (Paleocene)
  - El Carrizo Formation (Danian)
  - Roca Formation (Danian in the south, late Maastrichtian in the north)
  - Loncoche Formation (Maastrichtian to Danian)
  - Jagüel Formation (middle to late Maastrichtian)
  - Allen Formation (middle Campanian to early Maastrichtian)
- Diamante Formation (Cenomanian-Campanian)
- Neuquén Group
  - Río Colorado Subgroup (Santonian to early Campanian)
    - Anacleto Formation (early Campanian)
    - Bajo de la Carpa Formation (Santonian)
  - Río Neuquén Subgroup (late Turonian to Coniacian)
    - Plottier Formation (late Coniacian ?to early Santonian)
    - Sierra Barrosa Formation (middle to late Coniacian)
    - Los Bastos Formation (early to middle Coniacian)
    - Portezuelo Formation (late Turonian to early Coniacian)
  - Río Limay Subgroup (Cenomanian to early Turonian)
    - Lisandro Formation (late Cenomanian to early Turonian)
    - Huincul Formation (late Cenomanian)
    - Candeleros Formation (early Cenomanian)
- Los Machís Formation (Cenomanian to Santonian)
- Late Mirano unconformity (98 Ma)
- Lohan Cura Formation (Late Aptian to Albian)
- Rayoso Group (Aptian to Albian)
  - Rayoso Formation (Albian)
  - Middle Mirano unconformity (117 Ma)
  - Huitrín Formation (Aptian)
  - La Amarga Formation (Barremian to early Aptian)
- Early Mirano unconformity (123 Ma)
- Centenario Formation (Valanginian) to Barremian)
- Mendoza Group (early Tithonian to earliest Aptian
  - Agrio Formation (Hauterivian to earliest Aptian) or late Valanginian to latest Barremian
  - Unconformity (129 Ma)
  - Chachao Formation (Valanginian to Hauterivian)
  - Unconformity (134 Ma)
  - Mulichinco Formation (Valanginian)
  - Bajada Colorada Formation (Late Berriasian to Early Valanginian)
  - Loma Montosa Formation (Berriasian to Valanginian)
  - Quintuco Formation (Berriasian to Valanginian)
  - Picún Leufú Formation (Tithonian to Berriasian)
  - Lindero de Piedra Formation
  - Vaca Muerta (Tithonian to Berriasian)
  - Quebrada del Sapo Formation (Kimmeridgian)
  - Catriel Formation (Kimmeridgian)
- Tordillo Formation (Kimmeridgian) (Note: Some authors include the Tordillo Formation within the Mendoza Group, others do not)
- Unconformity (154 Ma)
- Río Damas Formation (Late Jurassic)
- Lotena Group (middle Callovian to late Oxfordian)
  - Auquilco Formation (late Oxfordian)
  - La Manga Formation (early Oxfordian)
  - Lotena Formation (Callovian to Oxfordian)
- Cuyo Group (Pliensbachian to middle Callovian)
  - Challaco Formation (Bathonian)
  - Tábanos Formation (Callovian)
  - Calabozo Formation (Middle Jurassic)
  - Punta Rosada Formation
  - Lajas Formation (Bajocian to Bathonian)
  - Tres Esquinas Formation (Toarcian to Callovian)
  - Los Molles Formation (Pliensbachian to Callovian) (Note: Some authors include the Los Molles Formation within the Cuyo Group, others do not)
  - Chuchil Formation (Pliensbachian)
- Piedra del Aguila Formation (Early to Middle Jurassic)
- Sañicó Formation (Early to Middle Jurassic)
- Sierra Chacaico Formation (Early to Middle Jurassic)
- Puesta Araya Formation (Hettangian to Bathonian)
- El Freno Formation (Pliensbachian to Toarcian)
- Primavera Formation (Hettangian to Sinemurian)
- Lapa Formation (Hettangian to Sinemurian)
- Nestares Formation (Early Jurassic)
- Planicie Morada Formation (Late Triassic to Sinemurian)
- Paso Flores Formation (Late Triassic)
- Milla Michicó Formation (Late Triassic)
- Remoredo Formation (Late Triassic)
- Chihuido Formation (Late Triassic)
- Tronqulmalal Formation (Mid-Late Triassic)
- Cordillera del Viento Formation (Early to Middle Triassic)

Paleozoic

- Choiyoi Group (Late Permian-Mid Triassic)
  - El Palque Formation
  - Horcajos Formation
  - Portezuelo del Cenizo Formation
  - Tambillos Formation
  - Vega de Los Machos Formation

== Petroleum geology ==
The Neuquén Basin is an important oil and gas producing basin in Argentina. Production started in 1918 and accumulated to 928 thousand cubic metres (5.84 million barrels) of oil equivalent in 2004, representing 45% of the oil production in Argentina and 61% of its gas production. The basin is also important for unconventionals, with the Vaca Muerta and Los Molles formations being major shale gas producers.

Source rock formations are predominantly the Vaca Muerta, and to a lesser extent the Agrio and Los Molles Formations. Reservoir rocks comprise the Mulichinco and Chachao Formations. Deeper reservoirs are the Lotena and Barda Negra Formations. Regional seal rocks are the evaporites of the Auquilco and Huitrín Formations, with local seals the Vaca Muerta, Agrio and Catriel Formations.

== Notes and references ==
=== Bibliography ===
Geologic map

- Rodríguez, María F.; Leanza, Héctor A.; Salvarredy Aranguren, Matías (2007), Hoja Geológica 3969-II, NEUQUÉN, provincias del Neuquén, Río Negro y La Pampa 1:250,000, Instituto de Geología y Recursos Minerales, pp. 1–165

General

- Balgord, Elizabeth A (2017), "Triassic to Neogene evolution of the south-central Andean arc determined by detrital zircon U-Pb and Hf analysis of Neuquén Basin strata, central Argentina (34°S–40°S)", Lithosphere, 9 (3): 453–462, Bibcode:2017Lsphe...9..453B, doi:10.1130/L546.1
- Balgord, Elizabeth A.; Carapa, Barbara (2014), "Basin evolution of Upper Cretaceous–Lower Cenozoic strata in the Malargüe fold-and-thrust belt: northern Neuquen Basin, Argentina" (PDF), Basin Research: 1–24
- Escosteguy, Leonardo; Franchi, Mario (2010), "Estratigrafía de la región de Chapelco, Provincia del Neuquén" (PDF), Revista de la Asociación Geológica Argentina, 66: 418–429
- Garrido, Alberto C (2011), El Grupo Neuquén (Cretácico Tardío) en la Cuenca Neuquina, XVIII Congreso Geológico Argentino, pp. 231–244
- Gómez Dacal, Alejandro R.; Gómez Peral, Lucía E.; Spalletti, Luis A.; Sial, Alcides N.; Siccardi, Aron; Poiré, Daniel G. (2018), "First record of the Valanginian positive carbon isotope anomaly in the Mendoza shelf, Neuquén Basin, Argentina: palaeoclimatic implications", Andean Geology, 45 (2): 111–129, doi:10.5027/andgeoV45n2-3059, hdl:11336/64562
- Howell, John A.; Schwartz, Ernesto; Spalletti, Luis A.; Veiga, Gonzalo D. (2005), "The Neuquén Basin: An overview", Geological Society, London, Special Publications, 252: 1–14, Bibcode:2005GSLSP.252....1H, doi:10.1144/GSL.SP.2005.252.01.01, hdl:11336/108392
- Iñigo, Juan Francisco Pedro; Vargas, Renzo; Novara, Eugenia; Pereira, Diego Martin; Schwarz, Ernesto (2018), LA FORMACIÓN LOMA MONTOSA EN EL BORDE NORORIENTAL DE LA CUENCA NEUQUINA: ANÁLISIS SECUENCIAL, CARACTERIZACIÓN PALEOAMBIENTAL Y PROSPECTIVIDAD REMANENTE, 10º Congreso de Exploración y Desarrollo de Hidrocarburos, pp. 623–645
- Leanza, H.A.; Apesteguia, S.; Novas, F.E.; De la Fuente, M.S. (2004), "Cretaceous terrestrial beds from the Neuquén Basin (Argentina) and their tetrapod assemblages", Cretaceous Research, 25: 61–87, Bibcode:2004CrRes..25...61L, doi:10.1016/j.cretres.2003.10.005
- Lebinson, Fernando; Turienzo, Martín; Sánchez, Natalia; Araujo, Vanesa; D'Annunzio, María Celeste; Dimieri, Luis (2018), "The structure of the northern Agrio fold and thrust belt (37°30' S), Neuquén Basin, Argentina", Andean Geology, 45 (2): 249–273, doi:10.5027/andgeoV45n2-3049, hdl:11336/83841
- Mendiberri, Héctor O.; Giusano, Adolfo E.; Valdéz, Alex H. (2004), Cuenca Neuquína, reservas y recursos hidrocarburíferos, pp. 1–9
- Mescua, José Francisco; Giambiagi, Laura Beatriz; Ramos, Victor Alberto (2013), "Late Cretaceous Uplift in the Malargüe fold-and-thrust belt (35ºS), southern Central Andes of Argentina and Chile" (PDF), Andean Geology, 40: 102–116, doi:10.5027/andgeoV40n1-a05
- Mosquera, Alfonso; Ramos, Víctor A. (2006), "Intraplate Deformation in the Neuquén Embayment", Geological Society of America Special Papers, 407: 97–123
- Náñez, Carolina; Malumián, Norberto (2019), "Foraminíferos miocenos en la cuenca Neuquina, Argentina: implicancias estratigráficas y paleoambientales", Andean Geology, 46: 183–210, doi:10.5027/andgeoV46n1-3142, hdl:11336/118014
- Olivo, Mariano S.; Schwartz, Ernesto; Veiga, Gonzalo D. (2016), "Modelo de acumulación y evolución secuencial del intervalo cuspidal de la Formación Quintuco en su área tipo: implicancias para las reconstrucciones paleogeográficas del margen austral de la Cuenca Neuquina durante el Valanginiano", Andean Geology, 43: 215–239, doi:10.5027/andgeoV43n2-a04, hdl:11336/49209
- Ponce, Juan José; Montagna, Aldo Omar; Carmona, Noelia (2015), Geología de la Cuenca Neuquina y sus sistemas petroleros: una mirada integradora desde los afloramientos al subsuelo (PDF), Fundación YPF & Universidad Nacional de Río Negro, pp. 1–152
- Ramos, Víctor A.; Mahlburg Kay, Suzanne (2006). "Overview of the tectonic evolution of the southern Central Andes of Mendoza and Neuquén (35°–39°S latitude)". In Mahlburg Kay, Suzanne; Ramos, Víctor A. (eds.). Evolution of an Andean Margin: A Tectonic and Magmatic View from the Andes to the Neuquén Basin (35–39°S lat). Special Paper of the Geological Society of America. Vol. 407. pp. 1–17.
- Rojas Vera, Emilio Agustín; Orts, Darío L.; Folguera, Andrés; Zamora Valcarce, Gonzalo; Bottesi, Germán; Fennell, Lucas; Chiachiarelli, Francisco; Ramos, Víctor A. (2016), Folguera, Andrés; Naipauer, Maximiliano; Sagripanti, Lucía; Ghiglione, Matías C.; Orts, Darío L.; Giambiagi, Laura (eds.), The Transitional Zone Between the Southern Central and Northern Patagonian Andes (36–39°S) in Growth of the Southern Andes, Springer, pp. 99–114, ISBN 978-3-319-23060-3

Mesozoic

- Leanza, Héctor A (2017), "Las principales discordancias del Jurásico Superior y el Cretácico de la Cuenca Neuquina" (PDF), Anales de la Academia Nacional de Ciencias Exactas, Fisicas y Naturales, 57: 147–155
- Ottone, Eduardo G (2009), "La flora cretácica de Cuenca Neuquina, su significado paleoambiental y paleoclimático" (PDF), Revista de la Asociación Geológica Argentina, 65: 373–386
- Pángaro, Francisco; Pereira, Diego Martín; Micucci, Eduardo (2009), "El sinrift de la dorsal de Huincul, Cuenca Neuquina: evolución y control sobre la estratigrafía y estructura del área", Revista de la Asociación Geológica Argentina, 65
- Voglino, Sergio (2017), Caracterización del Miembro Pilmatué de la Formación Agrio como reservorio no convencional de tipo shale (MSc. thesis), Universidad Nacional de Río Negro, pp. 1–196
- Zavala, Carlos Alberto (1993), Estratigrafía y análisis de facies de la Formación Lajas (Jurásico medio) en el sector suroccidental de la Cuenca Neuquina, Provincia del Neuquén, República Argentina (PhD thesis), Universidad Nacional del Sur, pp. 1–254
- Zavattieri, Ana María; Mego, Natalia (2008), "Registro palinológico de la Formación Paso Flores (Triásico Superior) sobre la margen sureste del Río Limay, Patagonia, Argentina", Ameghiniana, 45: 483–502

Vaca Mahuida Formation

- Montalvo, C.; Bond, M. (1998), "Un notoungulata de la Formación Vaca Mahuida (Eoceno), provincia de La Pampa, Argentina", Asociación Paleontológica Argentina, Publicación Especial, 5: 55–60

Ventana Formation

- Petrulevicius, J.F.; Popov, Y.A. (2014), "First fossil record of Discocephalinae (Insecta, Pentatomidae): a new genus from the middle Eocene of Río Pichileufú, Patagonia, Argentina", ZooKeys (422): 23–3, Bibcode:2014ZooK..422...23P, doi:10.3897/zookeys.422.6750, hdl:11336/32653, PMC 4109444, PMID 25061387
- Wilf, P.; Johnson, K.R.; Cúneo, N.R.; Smith, M.E.; Singer, B.S.; Gandolfo, M.A. (2005), "Eocene Plant Diversity at Laguna del Hunco and Río Pichileufú, Patagonia, Argentina", The American Naturalist, 165 (6): 634–650, doi:10.1086/430055, PMID 15937744

Chichinales Formation

- Agnolin, Federico L.; Chafrat, Pablo (2015), "New fossil bird remains from the Chichinales Formation (Early Miocene) of northern Patagonia, Argentina", Annales de Paléontologie, 101 (2): 87–94, Bibcode:2015AnPal.101...87A, doi:10.1016/j.annpal.2015.02.001
- Kramarz, Alejandro Gustavo; Paz, Ernesto Rodrigo (2013), "Un Hegetotheriidae (Mammalia, Notoungulata) basal del Mioceno temprano de Patagonia" (PDF), Revista Mexicana de Ciencias Geológicas, 30: 186–195

Cerro Bandera Formation

- Kramarz, Alejandro G.; Bond, Mariano; Arnal, Michelle (2015), "Systematic description of three new mammals (Notoungulata and Rodentia) from the early Miocene Cerro Bandera Formation, northern Patagonia, Argentina", Ameghiniana, 52 (6): 585–597, doi:10.5710/AMGH.27.06.2015.2906, hdl:11336/47331
- Kramarz, Alejandro; Garrido, Alberto; Forasiepi, Analía; Bond, Mariano; Tambussi, Claudia (2005), "Estratigrafia y vertebrados (Aves y Mammalia) de la Formación Cerro Bandera, Mioceno Temprano de la Provincia del Neuquén, Argentina", Revista Geológica de Chile, 32 (2): 273–291, doi:10.4067/S0716-02082005000200006
