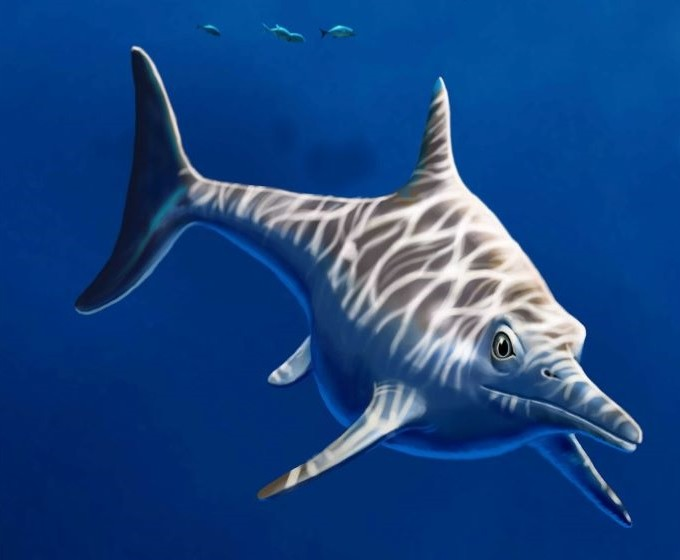
- Speculative life restoration

Scientific classification
- Kingdom: Animalia
- Phylum: Chordata
- Class: Reptilia
- Order: †Ichthyosauria
- Family: †Ophthalmosauridae
- Subfamily: †Platypterygiinae
- Genus: †Sumpalla; Campos et al., 2021
- Species: †S. argentina

Binomial name
- †Sumpalla argentina Campos et al., 2021

= Sumpalla =

Sumpalla Temporal range: Late Jurassic

Extinct genus of ichthyosaur

Sumpalla is an extinct genus of ophthalmosaurid ichthyosaurs from the Late Jurassic Vaca Muerta Formation of Argentina. It contains a single species, Sumpalla argentina. The holotype was initially believed to have belonged to Aegirosaurus before being placed in a new genus in 2021.
