= Chachao Formation =

Geological formation in Argentina

- Stratigraphic range: Valanginian; ~140–136 Ma
- Type: Geological formation
- Unit of: Mendoza Group
- Underlies: Agrio Formation
- Overlies: Vaca Muerta

Lithology
- Primary: Limestone
- Other: Mudstone

Location
- Coordinates: 35.0°S 69.7°W
- Approximate paleocoordinates: 33.8°S 33.0°W
- Region: Mendoza Province
- Country: Argentina
- Extent: Neuquén Basin
- Chachao Formation (Argentina)

The Chachao Formation is a geological formation in the Mendoza Province in northern Patagonian Argentina. It is Valanginian in age and is predominantly marine, being deposited at a time of marine transgression in the Neuquén Basin, and predominantly consists of carbonate rocks.

The formation belongs to the Mendoza Group, sediments deposited on the Mendoza Shelf. The formation overlies the Vaca Muerta and is overlain by the Agrio Formation.

== Description ==
A typical feature of the Chachao Formation is the dominance of oysters, many of them quite large e.g. Aetostreon latissimun, and others small, e.g. Ceratostreon minos. Different kinds of semi-infaunal soft bottom dwellers and swimming bivalves were recognized. Additional forms are represented by gastropods, ammonites (Olcostephanus curacoensis), and ichnofossils such as Thalassinoides sp. Serpulids are represented by the colonial Sarcinella sp., and the solitary form Parsimonia sp. The highly diverse fauna of the analyzed succession, made up with numerous stenohaline elements such as echinoderm, bryozoa, ammonite as well as serpulids and typical marine pelecypods indicate a fully marine environment.

== Fossil content ==
The formation has provided the following fossils:

- Decapods
  - Callianassa aff. peruviana
- Ammonites
  - Groebericeras bifrons
  - Olcostephanus curacoensis
- Polychaeta
  - Parsimonia sp.
  - Sarcinella occidentalis
- Bivalves
  - Exogyra caudoni
  - Cucullaea sp.
  - Exogyra (Aetostreon)
  - Amphidonte (Ceratostreon)
  - Eriphyla sp.
  - Myoconcha sp.
  - Pinna sp.
  - Pecten sp.
  - Ptychomya sp.
  - Trigonia sp.
- Ichnofossils
  - Thalassinoides sp.
