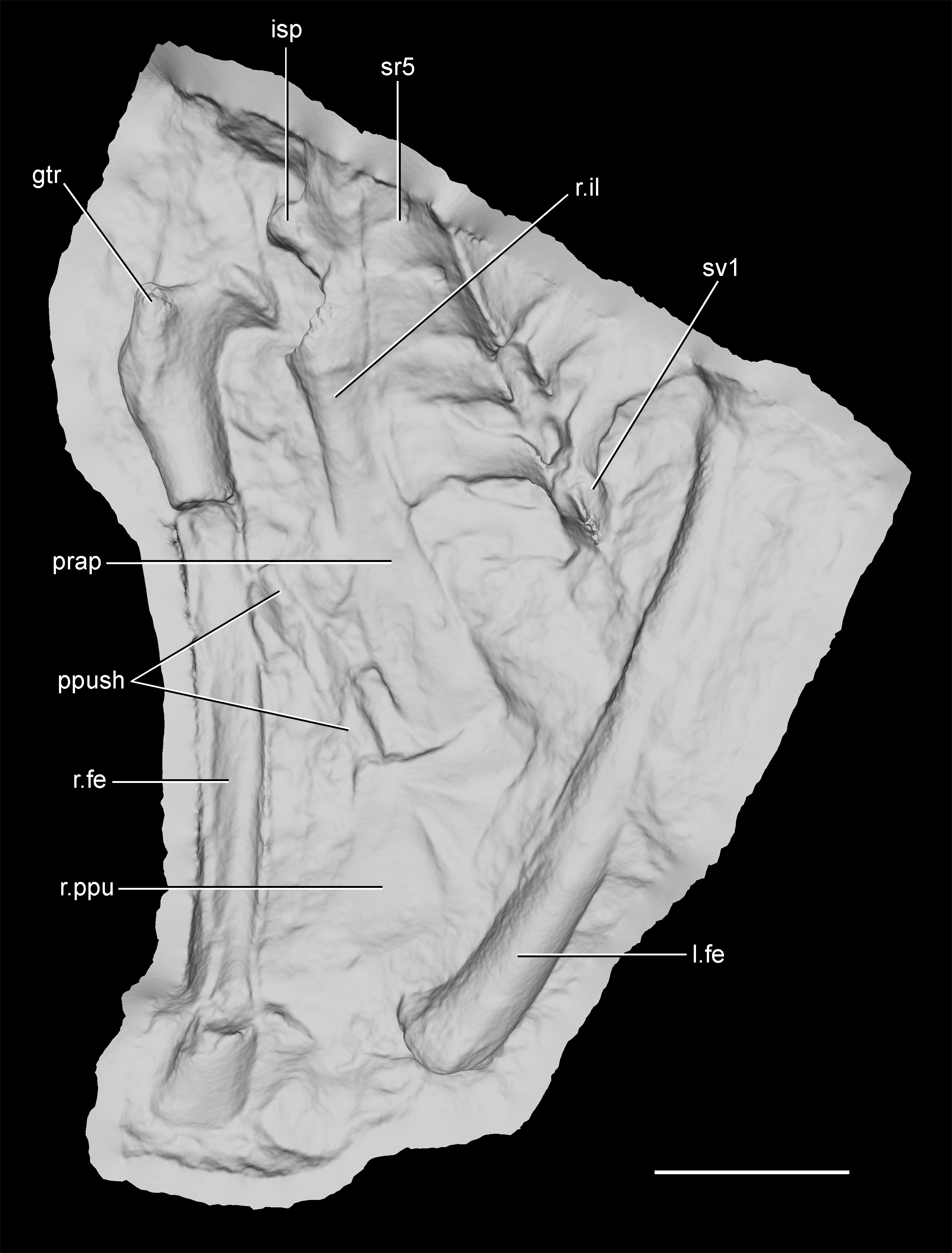
- Digital cast of the holotype specimen

Scientific classification
- Domain: Eukaryota
- Kingdom: Animalia
- Phylum: Chordata
- Order: †Pterosauria
- Suborder: †Pterodactyloidea
- Clade: †Lophocratia
- Clade: †Dsungaripteroidea
- Genus: †Herbstosaurus; Casamiquela, 1975
- Species: †H. pigmaeus

Binomial name
- †Herbstosaurus pigmaeus Casamiquela, 1975

= Herbstosaurus =

Herbstosaurus Temporal range: Late Jurassic ~150 Ma

Genus of pterodactyloid pterosaurs

Herbstosaurus (meaning "Herbst lizard") is an extinct genus of pterosaurs that lived during the late Jurassic period in what is now Argentina. The genus contains a single species, H. pigmaeus, known from a partial skeleton. The specimen was initially identified as belonging to a small theropod dinosaur, but was later recognized as belonging to a pterosaur.

== History ==
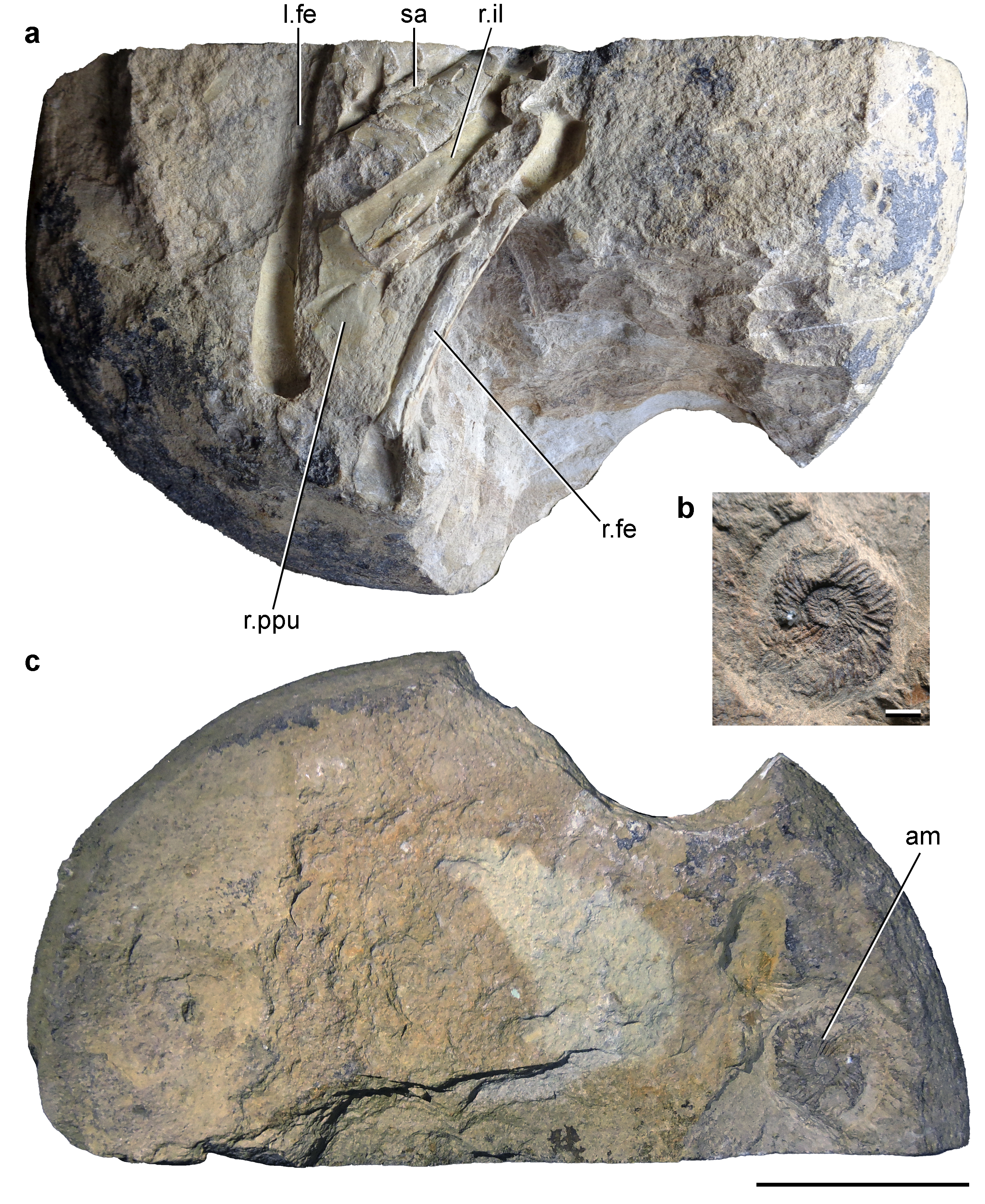
Holotype specimen alongside a preserved ammonite (cf. Lytohoplites alternans)

In 1969, Argentine paleobotanist Rafael Herbst dug up a piece of sandstone Neuquén Province at Picun Leufú, containing a number of disarticulated bones of a small reptile. At the time it was assumed the rock dated to the Middle Jurassic (Callovian), about 163 million years ago.

In 1975, paleontologist Rodolfo Magín Casamiquela named the find as a new genus and species, Herbstosaurus pigmaeus. The genus name honours Herbst and connects his name to Greek sauros, "lizard", a usual element in the name of dinosaurs. The specific name is derived from Greek pygmaios, "dwarf", as it was thought the form represented a small Compsognathus-like coelurosaurian theropod belonging to the Coeluridae and one of the smallest dinosaurs then known.

The holotype is CTES-PZ-1711, consisting of a sacrum, pelvic elements, and both femora preserved within a sandstone nodule which also contains an ammonite identified in 2025 as cf. Lytohoplites alternans. The dispersed bones are compressed, crushed by the weight of the layers above. Casamiquela had already indicated that the new species was very distinct because of an atypically long ilium and short ischium. In 1978, while reviewing the relations of Compsognathus, John Ostrom concluded that these qualities were best explained if Herbstosaurus was not a dinosaur but a pterosaur, for which such proportions are typical. The new identification allowed some fragmentary pterosaur material found in the same layers to be referred to Herbstosaurus, including a wing bone.

== Classification ==
Historically, determining the phylogenetic position of Herbstosaurus has been complicated. José Bonaparte and John Ostrom placed Herbstosaurus within Pterosauria in 1978 and 1980. In 1981, Peter Galton stated it was a member of the Pterodactyloidea. In his 1988 general textbook on vertebrate paleontology, Robert Carroll narrowed that down to the Pterodactylidae. However, in 1991, Peter Wellnhofer suggested it was not a pterodactyloid but a more basal pterosaur, because of the form of the pelvis. In 1996, David Unwin concluded Herbstosaurus was a basal member of the Dsungaripteroidea. This was again doubted by Laura Codorniú and Zulma Gasparini in 2007.

In 2025, Ezcurra et al. reanalysed the Herbstosaurus holotype. While the specimen is fragmentary, they were able to score it in a phylogenetic dataset to test its relationships and affinities with other pterosaurs. Based on the anatomy of its femur, they recovered Herbstosaurus as a member of the Dsungaripteroidea, deeply nested within Pterodactyloidea. Their results are displayed in the cladogram below:

- Pterodactyloidea
  - Pterodactylus
  - - - Liaodactylus
      - - - Gnathosaurus
          - Aurorazhdarcho
        - - Pterodaustro
          - Ctenochasma
          - Gladocephaloideus
          - Gegepterus
    - - - - Haopterus
          - Nurhachius
          - Istiodactylus
        - - Boreopterus
          - - Pteranodon
            - - Muzquizopteryx
              - Nyctosaurus
        - - Ludodactylus
          - Coloborhynchus
          - Anhanguera
          - Ornithocheirus
      - - Azhdarchoidea
        - Dsungaripteroidea
          - Noripterus
          - Tatal pterosaur
          - Dsungaripterus
          - Germanodactylus rhamphastinus
          - Germanodactylus cristatus
          - Herbstosaurus

== See also ==
- List of pterosaur genera
- Timeline of pterosaur research
