= Pseudoctenis =

Pseudoctenis Temporal range: Permian–Cretaceous

Scientific classification
- Kingdom: Plantae
- Clade: Tracheophytes
- Clade: Gymnospermae
- Division: Cycadophyta
- Class: Cycadopsida
- Order: Cycadales
- Family: †Nilssoniaceae
- Genus: †Pseudoctenis; Seward (1911)

Species
- See text.

Extinct genus of cycads

Pseudoctenis is a genus of fossil foliage attributable to the Cycadales. It is one of the most common genera of cycad fossil foliage in the Mesozoic era. Pseudoctenis leaves were ≈ 1m (3ft 3in) long, they were leaves that are divided into a series of elongated leaflets (pinnate) and attached to a central axis (rachis) are characteristic of many Mesozoic fossil floras. Pseudoctenis are similar to modern-day cycads and some, but not all (Zamites) are actually cycad remains.

== Taxonomy ==
The genus was erected by Albert Seward based on material from the Jurassic of Sutherland. Although he did not publish a diagnosis for the genus, he noticed the similarity with the genus Ctenis, stating that the main difference between the two is the absence of anastomoses in Pseudoctenis.

A 2023 study found this genus to be polyphyletic, with various species closely related to Ctenis, Cycadaceae, and Zamiaceae.

=== Species ===
Species that have been placed in this genus include:

- Pseudoctenis azcaratei
- Pseudoctenis ballii
- Pseudoctenis eathiensis (type species)
- Pseudoctenis fissa
- Pseudoctenis fragilis
- Pseudoctenis grossa
