= San Rafael orogeny =

The San Rafael orogeny was an orogeny that affected parts of western Argentina and Chile during the Late Paleozoic. The resulting orogenic belt has a NW-NNW curved form. The San Rafael orogeny might have been linked with the roughly contemporary Gondwanide orogeny of eastern Argentina. Parts of the Choiyoi Group sediments were deformed by the San Rafael orogeny. During the Neogene ancient faults related to the San Rafael orogeny conditioned the geometry of the blocks affected by the Andean orogeny.

Some of the plutons of the Elqui-Limarí Batholith were emplaced a context of crustal thickening derivative of the San Rafael orogeny.
