= Carapacha Formation =

Geologic formation in Argentina

- Stratigraphic range: Artinskian-Wuchiapingian; ~280–252 Ma
- Type: Geological formation
- Sub-units: Calencó & Urre-Lauquen members
- Underlies: Choiyoi Group (partially intruding)
- Overlies: not observed
- Thickness: 630 m (2,070 ft)

Lithology
- Primary: Sandstone, mudstone
- Other: Conglomerate, paleosols

Location
- Coordinates: 38.2°S 65.9°W
- Approximate paleocoordinates: 51.6°S 43.1°W
- Region: La Pampa Province
- Country: Argentina
- Extent: Sierra de Calencó, Carapacha Basin
- Carapacha Formation (Argentina)

The Carapacha Formation is a geological formation of the Sierra de Calencó, Carapacha Basin of La Pampa Province, Argentina whose strata date back to the Artinskian to Wuchiapingian of the Permian. The formation comprises two members, the lower Calencó member, named after the eponymous mountain range, and the Urre-Lauquen member, named after the Urre-Lauquen Lake bordering the range to the north.

The members are separated by an unconformity and represent a lacustrine (Calencó) and fluvial-dominated depositional environment. Ichnofossils of several groups of Permian reptiles and amphibians as well as flora have been retrieved from the formation. Traces on especially the Glossopteris leaves have been interpreted as suction tracks by arthropods.

== Description ==
The Carapacha Basin is considered to be a continental half-graben of Permian age located in southern La Pampa province, central Argentina, between approximately 37° 30' to 38° 40' S and 65° 40' to 66° 20' W. The basin filling is about 630 metres (2,070 ft) thick and entirely composed of the Carapacha Formation. The base of the formation cannot be observed and is covered and intruded by Permian-Triassic volcanic rocks of the Choiyoi Group.

The Carapacha Formation comprises red and gray arkosic or lithic sandstones, mudstones and rare conglomerates. The formation has been subdivided into two members, separated by an unconformity; the lower Calencó Member and the upper Urre-Lauquen Member. The lower member was deposited in a lacustrine environment, while braided fluvial environments dominate the upper member.

== Fossil content ==
The following fossils were reported from the formation:

- Ichnofossils
  - Batrachichnus salamandroides
  - Hyloidichnus bifurcatus
  - Characichnos sp.
  - cf. Amphisauropus sp.
  - cf. Varanopus sp.
- Flora
  - Cordaites sp.
  - Dictyopteridium sp.
  - Gangamopteris sp.
  - Glossopteris sp.
  - Neomariopteris sp.
  - Paracalamites sp.
  - Pecopteris sp.
  - Phyllotheca sp.

== See also ==
- Ischigualasto Formation
- Irati Formation
