= Mauro Brandoni =

Argentine footballer

Personal information
- Date of birth: February 24, 1984 (age 42)
- Place of birth: Buenos Aires, Argentina
- Height: 1.94 m (6 ft 4 in)
- Position: Defender

Senior career*
Years	Team	Apps	(Gls)
2006–2007	Sportivo Patria	20	(0)
2008–2009	Independiente José Terán	18	(2)
2010	Atlético Lujan	0	(0)
2010	Osorno	5	(0)
2012	Villa Belgrano	6	(0)
2013–2019	Independiente (Rio Colorado)	65	(2)
Total		114	(4)
- * Club domestic league appearances and goals

Mauro Brandoni (born December 19, 1984, in Buenos Aires, Argentina) is an Argentine former professional footballer who played as a defender.
