= Choiyoi Group =

Group of volcano-sedimentary formations in Argentina and Chile

- Stratigraphic range: Permian-Triassic
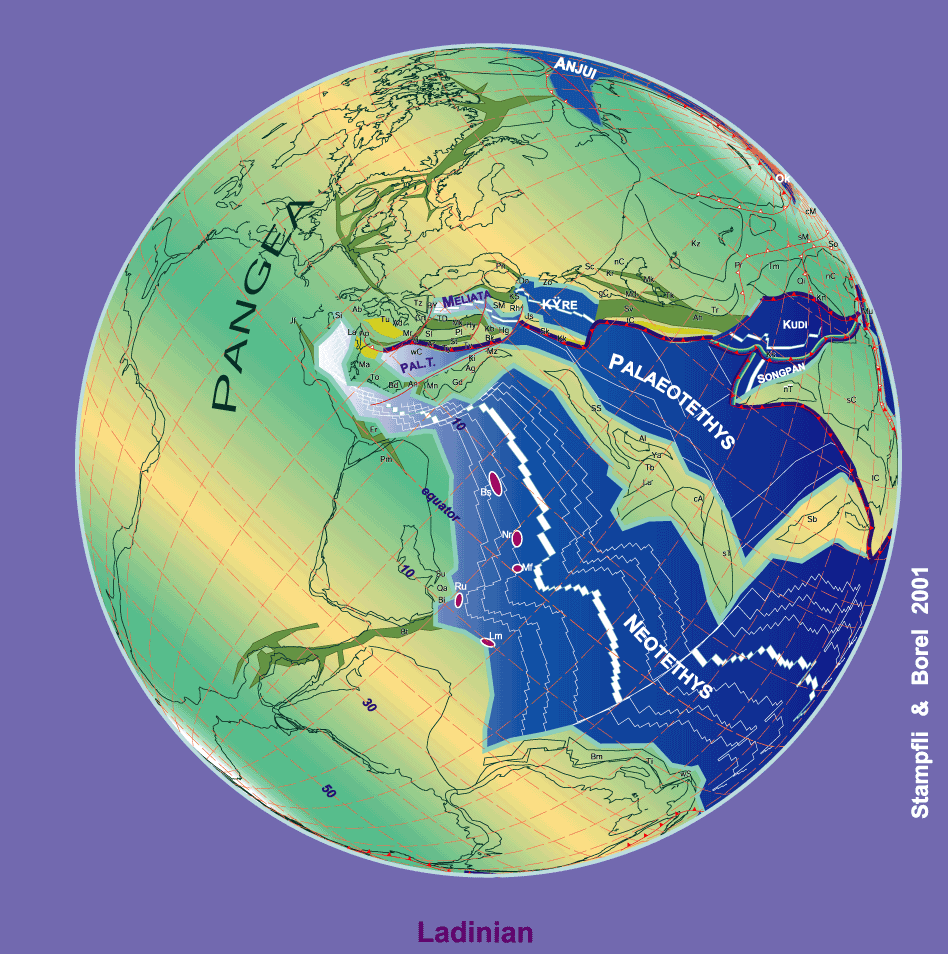
- Type: Group
- Unit of: Frontal Cordillera, San Rafael Massif, Principal Cordillera
- Sub-units: El Palque Fm., Horcajos Fm., Portezuelo del Cenizo Fm., Tambillos Fm., Vega de Los Machos Fm.
- Underlies: Mendoza & Cuyo Groups
- Overlies: Carapacha Formation (Sierra de Calencó)
- Area: >200,000 km^{2} (77,000 sq mi)
- Thickness: 2–4 km (6,600–13,100 ft)

Lithology
- Primary: Basaltic lava flow, breccia, andesite, rhyolitic ignimbrite
- Other: Dacite

Location
- Region: South America
- Country: Argentina; Chile

Type section
- Named by: Stipanicic et al.
- Year defined: 1968

Choiyoi Group (Spanish: Grupo Choiyoi (Note: Pablo Groeber described the group as early as in 1918. Subsequently the Choiyoi Group became known by a variety of names. The current name dates to the 1968 work of Stipanicic and co-workers where the group was described in a locality in Somún Cura Massif, Río Negro Province.)) is a Permian and Triassic-aged group of volcano-sedimentary formations in Argentina and Chile. The group bears evidence of bimodal-style volcanism related to an ancient subduction zone that existed along the western margin of the supercontinent Gondwana.

The Choiyoi Group has a large areal extent through western Argentina and parts of Chile, covering at least 200,000 square kilometres (77,000 sq mi), but probably around 500,000 square kilometres (190,000 sq mi). While the subsurface extent of the group is large, exposures in Argentina are most common in the Frontal Cordillera, the San Rafael Massif and the Principal Cordillera of southern Mendoza and northern Neuquén. In parts the group reaches thicknesses of 2 to 4 km.

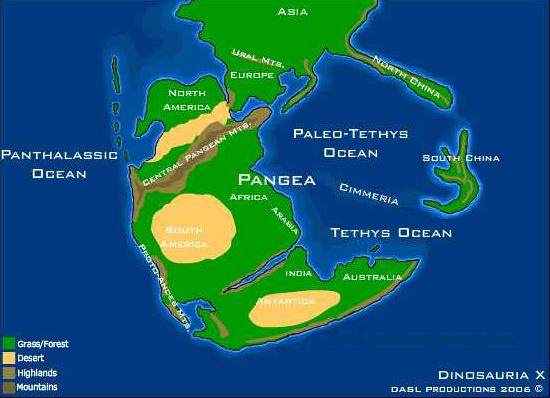
Paleogeographic reconstruction of Pangea, 237 million years ago. The Choiyoi Group was deposited immediately east of the Proto-Andes.

The plutonic equivalent of the Choiyoi Group volcanic material are mostly granitoids. The remnants of the magmatic arc that produced much of volcanic material is now preserved as a series of batholiths, including the Coastal Batholith of central Chile in the Chilean Coast Range. During the Permian, the zone of arc magmatism moved 350 kilometres (220 mi) inland from the Chilean Coast Range, reaching San Rafael about 280 million years ago.

Many Triassic basins in southern South America, including Cuyo Basin, have their lowermost sections made up of Choiyoi Group formations.

== Stratigraphy ==
The Choiyoi Group can be stratigraphically subdivided into a Lower Choiyoi Group and an Upper Choiyoi Group.

In the Lower Choiyoi Group basaltic lava flows, andesites and breccias are common. Volcanic rocks and sediments in the Lower Choiyoi Group belong to the calc-alkaline magma series and have also other geochemical signatures indicative of an origin in subduction zone volcanism. Volcanic rocks of the Lower Choiyoi in La Pampa and westernmost Buenos Aires Province have shoshonitic and syenitic features. Part of the Lower Choiyoi Group were erupted in association with the San Rafael orogeny while some Choiyoi Group sediments were deformed by the same orogeny.

Rhyolitic ignimbrites and lavas are more common in the Upper Choiyoi Group.

The Choiyoi Group include the following formations:

- El Palque, San Juan Province
- Horcajos, San Juan Province, Mendoza Province
- Portezuelo del Cenizo, San Juan Province, Mendoza Province
- Tambillos, Mendoza Province. This formation contains Sphenophyte fossils that are thought to have grown near an ancient lake.
- Vega de Los Machos, San Juan Province
