= Frontal Cordillera =

Mountain range in Argentina

Coordinates: 33°00′S 69°30′W

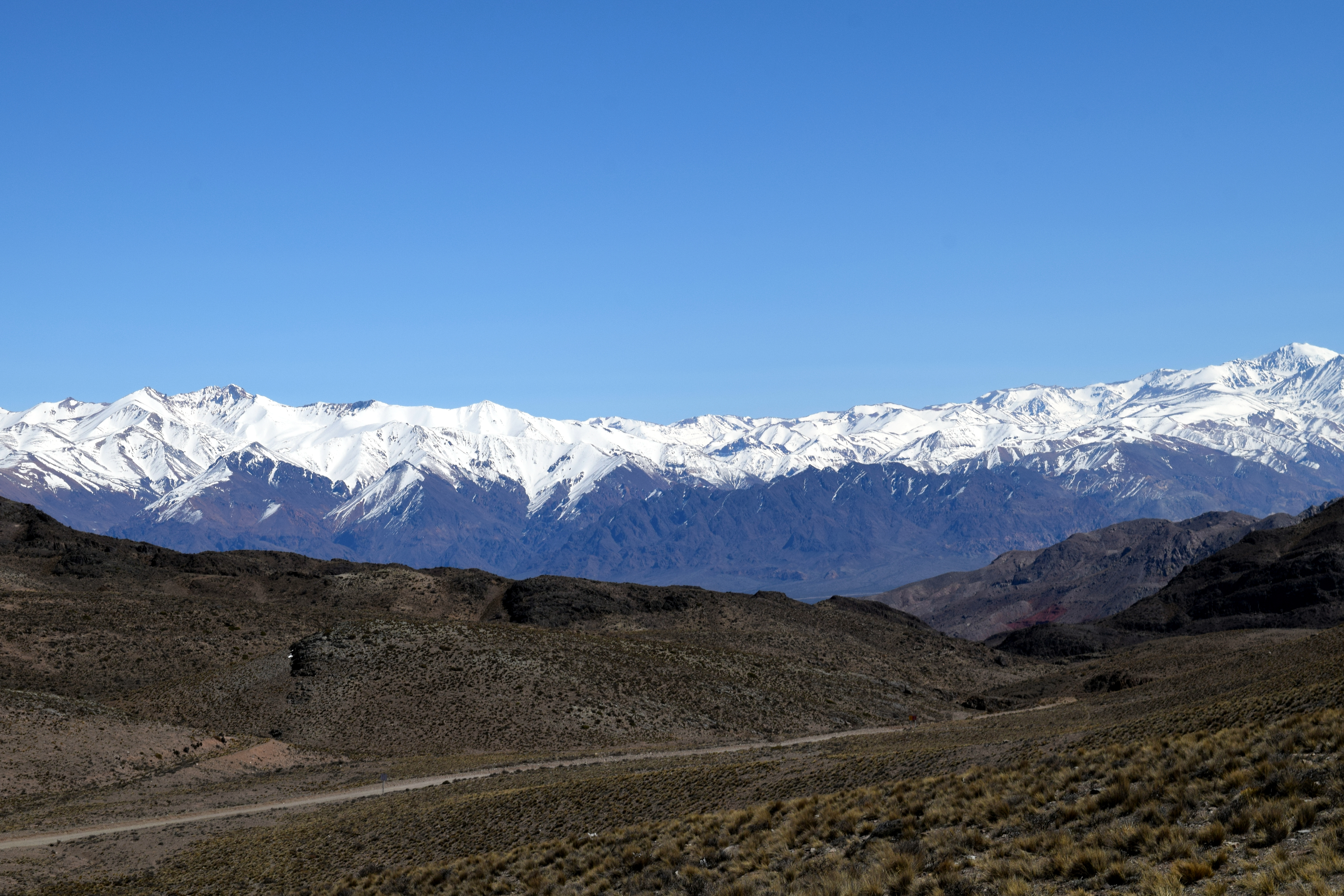
Cordón del Plata range, part of the Frontal Cordillera

The Frontal Cordillera (Spanish: Cordillera Frontal) is a mountain range in western Argentina that forms part of the Andes. It extends in a north–south direction in the provinces of La Rioja, San Juan and Mendoza. To the west of the Frontal Cordillera lies the Principal Cordillera that makes up the Argentina–Chile border and the continental divide.

The Frontal Cordillera has many summits between 5000 and 6000 m a.s.l. in Mendoza Province. It is subdivided into various lesser ranges such as Cordón del Plata, Cordón del Tigre, Cordón del Portillo, Cordón de Santa Clara, Cordón de las Llaretas and Cordón del Carrizalito.
