= Zulma Brandoni de Gasparini =

Argentine paleontologist

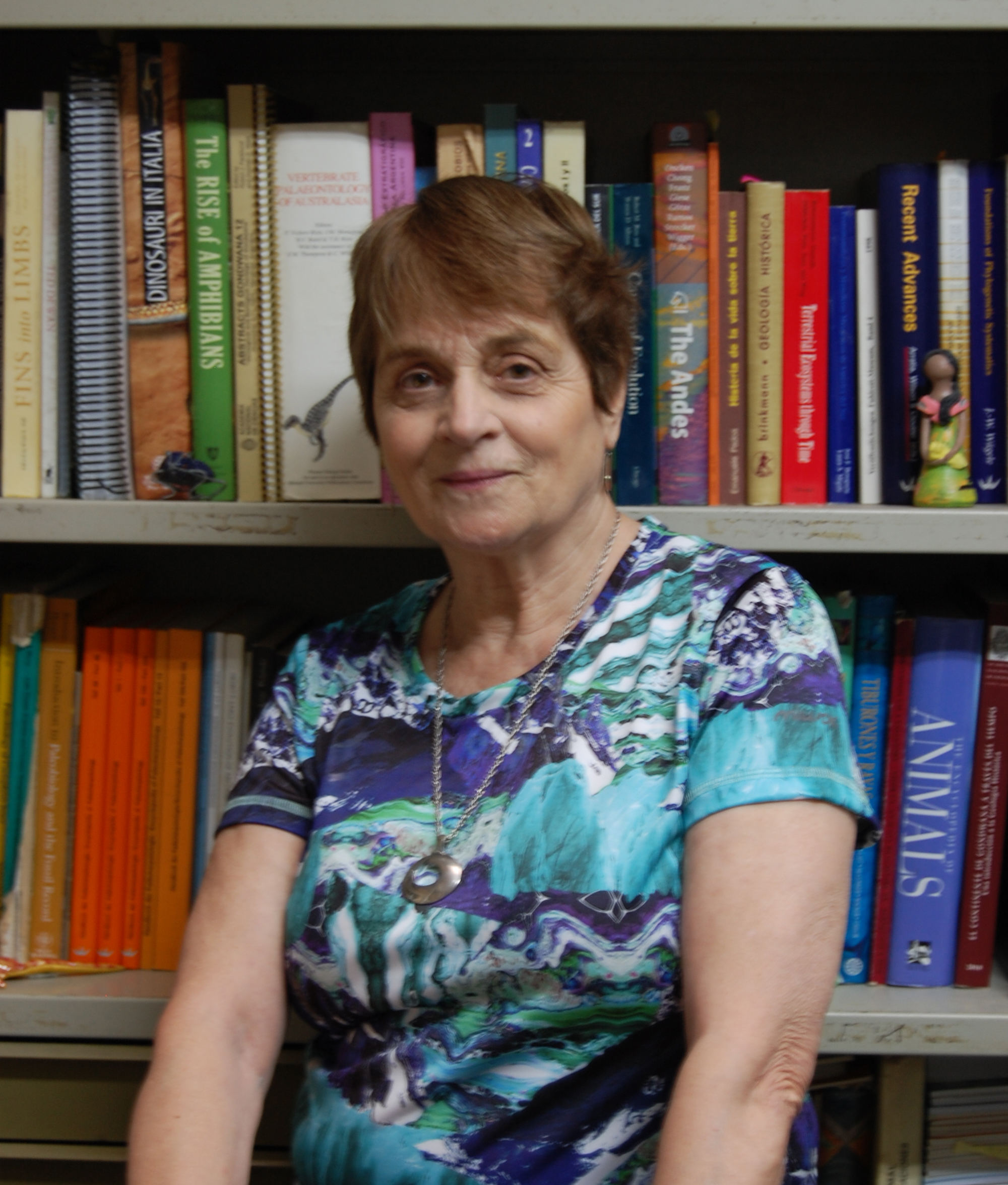
- Born: 15 May 1944 (age 82); La Plata, Argentina
- Awards: Prize Bernardo Houssay; Florentino Ameghino; Pellegrino Strobel

Academic background
- Education: National University of La Plata

Academic work
- Institutions: National Scientific and Technical Research Council
- Notable works: Gasparinisaura

Zulma Nélida Brandoni de Gasparini (born 15 May 1944) is an Argentine paleontologist and zoologist. She is known for discovering the fossils of the dinosaur Gasparinisaura, which was named after her.

== Work ==
Born in the city of La Plata, Argentina, on 15 May 1944, Brandoni de Gasparini graduated in zoology from the National University of La Plata in 1966 and obtained her PhD in Natural Sciences in 1973.

Zulma Brandoni de Gasparini was internationally recognized in the nineties for leading the team that discovered the Gasparinisaura. She is a recognized expert in Mesozoic reptilians of South America.

In 1972, she started her scientific career at the CONICET, where she was promoted in 2003 to the grade of Superior Researcher. She is today a professor in Paleontology of Vertebrates at the National University of La Plata.

== Honours ==
Brandoni de Gasparini has been awarded, among others recognitions, the Prize "Bernardo Houssay" of the CONICET (1987), the Prize to the Merit of the Argentinian Paleontological Association (2001) and the Prize Florentino Ameghino of the National Academy of Exact and Natural Sciences (2002). She received the Prize Pellegrino Strobel in 2013. In 2023, she was granted the Konex Award Merit Diploma for her work in Palaeontology in the last decade.
