= List of shipwrecks in October 1821 =

The list of shipwrecks in October 1821 includes ships sunk, wrecked, or otherwise lost during October 1821.

== 1 October ==
List of shipwrecks: 1 October 1821
| Ship | State | Description |
|---|---|---|
| Despatch | United Kingdom | The ship was driven ashore at Lamlash, Isle of Arran. She was on a voyage from Glasgow, Renfrewshire to Belfast, County Antrim. |
| John and Ann | United Kingdom | The ship sank at Great Yarmouth, Norfolk. She was on a voyage from Saint Petersburg. Russia to London. |
| Eliza | United Kingdom | The full-rigged ship was driven against the quayside and wrecked at Kingstown, County Dublin. |
| Looe | United Kingdom | The ship was driven ashore at Berck, Pas-de-Calais, France. She was on a voyage from Plymouth, Devon to London. |
| Maria Catherina | Denmark | The ship foundered off Flekkerøy, Norway. She was on a voyage from Flensburg to Bergen, Norway. |
| Speculation | Netherlands | The ship was driven ashore in the Zwinder. She was refloated in November. |

== 2 October ==
List of shipwrecks: 2 October 1821
| Ship | State | Description |
|---|---|---|
| Henriette Maria | Netherlands | The ship ran aground at Swinemünde, Prussia. |
| Providentia | Spain | The brig was wrecked at St. Agnes, Isles of Scilly, United Kingdom. Her crew were rescued. She was on a voyage from St. Andero to Bristol, Gloucestershire, United Kingdom |
| Resolution | United Kingdom | The ship was driven ashore at Cucq, Pas-de-Calais, France. She was on a voyage from Susa, Beylik of Tunis to London. |
| Rose | United Kingdom | The yacht was lost near Seaton, Devon. Her crew were rescued. |

== 3 October ==
List of shipwrecks: 3 October 1821
| Ship | State | Description |
|---|---|---|
| Dido | Netherlands | The ship was wrecked on Düne. Her crew were rescued. She was on a voyage from Amsterdam, North Holland to Königsberg, Prussia. |

== 4 October ==
List of shipwrecks: 4 October 1821
| Ship | State | Description |
|---|---|---|
| Bee | United Kingdom | The ship sprang a leak and was beached at Falmouth, Cornwall. She was on a voyage from Poole, Dorset to Liverpool, Lancashire. |
| Fortitude | United Kingdom | The ship was driven ashore and wrecked at Roscoff, Finistère, France. |
| Hopewell | United Kingdom | The ship was driven ashore at Padstow, Cornwall and severely damaged. She was on a voyage from Sligo to London. Hopewell was refloated the next day. |
| Lord Nelson | United Kingdom | The pilot boat departed from the Isles of Scilly for Penzance, Cornwall. No further trace, presumed foundered in the Atlantic Ocean with the loss of all seven people on board. |
| Mary | United Kingdom | The brig was wrecked off the Isles of Scilly. Her crew were rescued. She was on a voyage from London to Porto, Portugal. |
| Wilhelmina | Russia | The ship capsized in the English Channel with the loss of a crew member. She was on a voyage from Pärnu to Porto. Wilhelmina was later taken into Portsmouth, Hampshire, United Kingdom. |

== 5 October ==
List of shipwrecks: 5 October 1821
| Ship | State | Description |
|---|---|---|
| Hero | United Kingdom | The pilot boat was wrecked on the Rock of Halweathers, Isles of Scilly. All 21 people on board survived. |
| Jane | United Kingdom | The ship was driven ashore and wrecked at Aberavon, Glamorgan. She was on a voyage from a Cornish port to Swansea, Glamorgan. |
| Margaret | United Kingdom | The ship was wrecked on Saaremaa, Russia. Her crew were rescued. She was on a voyage from Liverpool, Lancashire to Saint Petersburg, Russia. |
| Waterloo | United Kingdom | The ship sank at Porthdinllaen, Caernarvonshire. She was on a voyage from Waterford to Liverpool, Lancashire. |

== 6 October ==
List of shipwrecks: 6 October 1821
| Ship | State | Description |
|---|---|---|
| Amphitrite | Denmark | The ship was driven ashore at Marseille, Bouches-du-Rhône, France. She was subsequently set afire due to yellow fever amongst the crew. |
| Hope | United Kingdom | The ship was driven ashore and wrecked between Boulogne and Étaples, Pas-de-Calais, France. She was on a voyage from Exmouth, Devon to Memel, Prussia. |
| Minerva | United States | The ship departed from Smyrna, Ottoman Empire for New York. No further trace, presumed foundered with the loss of all hands. |

== 7 October ==
List of shipwrecks: 7 October 1821
| Ship | State | Description |
|---|---|---|
| Eliza Plummer | United Kingdom | The ship ran aground on the Burbo Bank, in Liverpool Bay. She was on a voyage from Liverpool, Lancashire to Greenock, Renfrewshire. She was refloated the next day and returned to Liverpool. |
| Thetis | United Kingdom | The ship was wrecked near "Boombey", Jutland. Her crew were rescued. |

== 10 October ==
List of shipwrecks: 10 October 1821
| Ship | State | Description |
|---|---|---|
| Fortuna | Russia | The ship was driven ashore on Götaland, Sweden. She was on a voyage from Ventspils to Leith, Lothian, United Kingdom.Fortuna was refloated in November. |

== 11 October ==
List of shipwrecks: 11 October 1821
| Ship | State | Description |
|---|---|---|
| Cosmopolita | United States | The ship was wrecked on the coast of East Florida, New Spain. Her crew survived. She was on a voyage from Charleston, South Carolina to New Orleans, Louisiana. |
| Louisa | Stettin | The ship was wrecked on the coast of Jutland. She was on a voyage from Stettin to Lisbon, Portugal. |

== 12 October ==
List of shipwrecks: 12 October 1821
| Ship | State | Description |
|---|---|---|
| Albacore | (United Kingdom of Great Britain and Ireland) Guernsey | Albicore was lost at Bahia, Brazil with the loss of three of her crew. She was on a voyage from Buenos Aires, Argentina to Barbados. |
| William | United Kingdom | The ship was lost near Campbeltown, Argyllshire. she was on a voyage from Irvine, Ayrshire to Dublin. |

== 13 October ==
List of shipwrecks: 13 October 1821
| Ship | State | Description |
|---|---|---|
| Cuba | United Kingdom | The ship was wrecked on a reef off Mayaguana, Bahamas, her crew were rescued. She was on a voyage from Liverpool. Lancashire to Havana, Cuba. |
| Elizabeth | United Kingdom | The ship was driven ashore at Doolin, County Clare, where she was wrecked two days later. She was on a voyage from a Welsh port to Galway. |

== 14 October ==
List of shipwrecks: 14 October 1821
| Ship | State | Description |
|---|---|---|
| Harvey | United Kingdom | The ship departed from Milford Haven, Pembrokeshire for Youghal, County Cork. No further trace, presumed foundered in the Irish Sea with the loss of all hands. |
| Kilmarnock | United Kingdom | The ship was driven ashore and severely damaged in Donegal Bay. |
| Quebec Packet | United Kingdom | The ship capsized off the mouth of the Weser. |

== 15 October ==
List of shipwrecks: 15 October 1821
| Ship | State | Description |
|---|---|---|
| Cuba | United Kingdom | The ship was wrecked on Mayaguana, Bahamas. Her crew survived. She was on a voyage from Liverpool, Lancashire to Cuba. |

== 16 October ==
List of shipwrecks: 16 October 1821
| Ship | State | Description |
|---|---|---|
| Huddart | United Kingdom | Lloyd's List reported that a gale had driven the ship onto the rocks near Wolf’s Cove during a voyage to London. She was reported as a total loss. |

== 18 October ==
List of shipwrecks: 18 October 1821
| Ship | State | Description |
|---|---|---|
| Caledonia | United Kingdom | The brig was lost on Fox Island. Her crew were rescued. |
| Isabella | United Kingdom | The brig was lost on Fox Island. Her crew were rescued. |

== 19 October ==
List of shipwrecks: 19 October 1821
| Ship | State | Description |
|---|---|---|
| Cordelia | United Kingdom | The ship struck the pier and sank at Liverpool, Lancashire. |
| Glanmire | United Kingdom | The sloop was wrecked on Mew Island, County Down. |

== 20 October ==
List of shipwrecks: 20 October 1821
| Ship | State | Description |
|---|---|---|
| Caledonia | United Kingdom | The ship was wrecked on Fox Island, New Brunswick, British North America. She was on a voyage from London to Miramichi, New Brunswick. |
| Delight | United Kingdom | The ship struck the pier and sank at Liverpool, Lancashire. |
| Elbe | United Kingdom | The ship was driven ashore and severely damaged north of Blyth, Northumberland. She was on a voyage from Hull, East Riding of Yorkshire to Newcastle upon Tyne, Northumberland. |
| Emperor Alexander | United Kingdom | The ship was wrecked on the Cannon Rock, off Portaferry, County Down. Her crew were rescued. She was on a voyage from Liverpool, Lancashire to Bahia, Brazil. |
| Marianne | (United Kingdom of Great Britain and Ireland) British North America | The ship was lost near Bilbao, Spain. Her crew were rescued. She was on a voyage from Newfoundland to Bilbao. |
| Phœnix | United Kingdom | The ship was wrecked in Bawas Bay, Isle of Lewis, Outer Hebrides. She was on a voyage from Arkhangelsk, Russia to Belfast, County Antrim. |

== 21 October ==
List of shipwrecks: 21 October 1821
| Ship | State | Description |
|---|---|---|
| Elizabeth | United Kingdom | The ship was in collision with Clara Maria (Sweden) in the North Sea off Lindesnes, Norway and consequently sank. She was on a voyage from Gothenburg, Sweden to London. Clara Maria was severely damaged and put into Mandal, Norway. |
| Resolution | United Kingdom | The ship capsized in the Atlantic Ocean. She was on a voyage from Nassau, Bahamas to St. Vincent. |

== 22 October ==
List of shipwrecks: 22 October 1821
| Ship | State | Description |
|---|---|---|
| Glenmore | United Kingdom | The ship ran aground on New Island and sank. She was on a voyage from Dublin to Belfast, County Antrim. |

== 23 October ==
List of shipwrecks: 23 October 1821
| Ship | State | Description |
|---|---|---|
| Europe | United Kingdom | The ship was lost 20 nautical miles (37 km) north east of Helsingfors, Grand Duchy of Finland. She was on a voyage from Chatham, Kent to Saint Petersburg, Russia. |
| Friends | United Kingdom | The ship was driven ashore near Lagos, Portugal, where she was burnt due to fever amongst the crew. |

== 24 October ==
List of shipwrecks: 24 October 1821
| Ship | State | Description |
|---|---|---|
| Catherine | United Kingdom | The ship foundered in the Bristol Channel with the loss of all on board. She was on a voyage from Waterford to Bristol, Gloucestershire. |
| Peter William | United Kingdom | The ship was driven ashore and wrecked on the Isle of Skye. Her crew were rescued. She was on a voyage from Stockholm, Sweden to Bristol. |
| Phœnix | United Kingdom | The ship was driven ashore and wrecked in Bawas Bay, Isle of Lewis, Outer Hebrides. She was on a voyage from Arkhangelsk, Russia to Belfast, County Antrim. |
| Scandinavian | Sweden | The ship was lost on the Oesby Reef, off Öland. She was on a voyage from Stockholm to Rio de Janeiro, Brazil. |

== 25 October ==
List of shipwrecks: 25 October 1821
| Ship | State | Description |
|---|---|---|
| John & Isaac | United Kingdom | The ship was driven ashhore west of Almería, Spain. She was on a voyage from Newfoundland, British North America to Livorno, Grand Duchy of Tuscany. |
| Sea Fox | United States | The ship capsized in the Atlantic Ocean with the loss of twelve lives. She was on a voyage from New York to Port-au-Prince, Haiti. |
| Success | United Kingdom | The ship departed from Little Placentia Sound for Waterford. No further trace, presumed foundered in the Atlantic Ocean with the loss of all hands. |
| Swan | United Kingdom | The ship was lost near Norrköping, Sweden. She was on a voyage from Saint Petersburg, Russia to London. |
| Waterloo | United Kingdom | The ship was driven ashore and wrecked in Fish-hook Bay, Cape of Good Hope. Her crew were rescued. |

== 26 October ==
List of shipwrecks: 26 October 1821
| Ship | State | Description |
|---|---|---|
| Elbe | United Kingdom | The ship ran aground at Blyth, Northumberland and was severely damaged. She was on a voyage from Hull, Yorkshire to Newcastle upon Tyne, Northumberland. |

== 27 October ==
List of shipwrecks: 27 October 1821
| Ship | State | Description |
|---|---|---|
| Clyde | United Kingdom | The ship ran aground in Loch Seaforth. She was on a voyage from Arkhangelsk, Russia to Lancaster, Lancashire. |
| Lark | United Kingdom | The ship was abandoned in the Atlantic Ocean. Twelve survivors of the eighteen people on board were rescued on 2 November west of the Shetland Islands by Seagull (United Kingdom). Lark was on a voyage from Saint John, New Brunswick, British North America to South Shields, County Durham. |

== 28 October ==
List of shipwrecks: 28 October 1821
| Ship | State | Description |
|---|---|---|
| Catherine | United Kingdom | The ship foundered off the coast of Pembrokeshire with the loss of all on board. She was on a voyage from Waterford to Bristol, Gloucestershire. |

== 29 October ==
List of shipwrecks: 29 October 1821
| Ship | State | Description |
|---|---|---|
| Gute Hoffnung | Russia | The ship was wrecked on Læsø, Denmark. She was on a voyage from Saint Petersburg to Bordeaux, Gironde, France. |
| Pieter & Emma | Netherlands | The ship was wrecked on Ascension Island. She was on a voyage from Batavia, Netherlands East Indies to Rotterdam, South Holland. |

== 30 October ==
List of shipwrecks: 30 October 1821
| Ship | State | Description |
|---|---|---|
| Catwyck | Netherlands | The ship was driven ashore in the Meuse (Dutch: Maas). She was on a voyage from Rotterdam, South Holland to Batavia, Netherlands East Indies. She was later refloated and taken into Hellevoetsluis, Zeeland. |
| Pollux | Norway | The ship was driven ashore 3 Norwegian miles (33.885 km) from Bergen. She was on a voyage from Bergen to St. Ubes, Portugal. |

== 31 October ==
List of shipwrecks: 31 October 1821
| Ship | State | Description |
|---|---|---|
| Juliet | United Kingdom | The ship was destroyed by fire at Wilmington, Delaware, United States. |

== Unknown date ==
List of shipwrecks: Unknown date in October 1821
| Ship | State | Description |
|---|---|---|
| Antoinette | (United Kingdom of Great Britain and Ireland) British North America | The ship was lost at Gaspé, Lower Canada. She was on a voyage from Quebec City, Lower Canada to Liverpool, Lancashire, United Kingdom. |
| Frederica | Sweden | The ship was driven ashore in the Vlie. She was on a voyage from Amsterdam, North Holland, Netherlands to Kristianstad. |
| Isaac Todd | United Kingdom | The ship was wrecked near Gaspé Point, Lower Canada. Her crew were rescued. She was on a voyage from London to Quebec City. |
| Lively | United Kingdom | The ship was driven ashore and wrecked in Glass Bay, Cape Breton Island, Nova Scotia, British North America in late October. Her crew were rescued. She was on a voyage from St. John's, Newfoundland to Sydney, Cape Breton Island. |
| Loyal Sam | United Kingdom | The ship was driven ashore at Diamond Harbour, Lower Canada before 20 October. |
| Magdalina | Russia | The ship was driven ashore at Arkhangelsk in late October. She was on a voyage from Arkhangelsk to London. |
| Mary Eliza | United Kingdom | The ship capsized in a dry dock at Liverpool. She was declared a total loss. |
| Myrtle | United Kingdom | The ship departed from Lisbon, Portugal for Newfoundland, British North America. No further trace, presumed foundered with the loss of all hands. |
| Nestor | United Kingdom | The ship foundered in the North Sea before 13 October. Her crew were rescued. |
| Perseverance | United Kingdom | The whaler, which had been captured off Santa Maria by the pirate Vicente Benavides in March, was burnt in the Tubul River. Her master, two mates, and several of her crew had been murdered. |
| Placid | United Kingdom | The ship foundered in the Bay of Fundy in early October. She was on a voyage from St. Andrews, New Brunswick, British North America to the West Indies. |
| Prontadate | Portugal | The schooner was wrecked on the coast of County Cork, United Kingdom. Her crew were rescued, She was on a voyage from St. Ubes, Spain to Dublin, United Kingdom. |
| San José | Spain | The ketch was captured and burnt off Cuba by an insurgent privateer before 30 October. |
| Tartar | United Kingdom | The ship was lost at Saint John, New Brunswick, British North America before 5 October. |
