= Battle of Tarpellanca =

Coordinates: 37.2309°S 72.6152°W

- Part of the Chilean War of Independence
Date	September 26, 1820
Location	Tarpellanca ford, on the banks of the Laja River
Result	Royalist victory

Belligerents
Chilean Army	(Spain) Royalists; Mapuche Allies

Commanders and leaders
Pedro Andrés del Alcázar	(Spain) Vicente Benavides (Spain) Juan Manuel Picó; Toqui Catrileo

Strength
600	2,400
- Surrendered survivors were massacred by the victors

The Battle of Tarpellanca (September 26, 1820) took place between the forces of nascent Chilean Army and Spanish royalist guerrillas, in the context of the Total War campaign, during the later stages of the Chilean War of Independence.

== Background ==
After their victory at the Battle of Pangal, the Loyalist forces, composed of approximately 2,400 guerrilla and Mapuche Allies under the command of Vicente Benavides, decided to attack and destroy the city of Los Angeles. This city was defended by around 400 line soldiers under the command of Marshal Pedro Andrés del Alcázar, and had already survived four attempts by the same enemy.

At this juncture, Marshal del Alcázar received forged orders from General Ramón Freire to evacuate the city and move his forces to reinforce Chillán and meet with the main Army that was operating out of Concepción. Marshal del Alcázar, ignorant of the defeat suffered by the Patriot army at Pangal decided to evacuate the city, taking with him all the inhabitants, who otherwise would have been massacred by the guerrillas. He left the city on the 25th at the head of the Cazadores de Coquimbo battalion, 50 artillery troops, approximately 150 friendly Mapuche allies and about a thousand civilians, with their properties and animals. The long train made for a very slow speed.

== The battle ==
As he was crossing the Laja River at the Tarpellanca ford, early on the morning of the 26th, the column was attacked by the troops of Benavides at the point where the river branched into two inlets leaving an islet in the middle. Marshal del Alcázar and almost all of his column were trapped there at the islet. A defense was hastily organized by making a circle out of the carts, but after 13 hours of battle, just as night was falling, the patriots started to run out of ammunition.

In order to try to save the many civilians that were traveling with his column, he decided to negotiate with Benavides. The Patriots surrendered in exchange for their lives and free passage for all the civilians, while Marshal del Alcázar and his officers were to remain as hostages and the surviving soldiers were to incorporate themselves to the guerrilla. The final truce was agreed at 2AM on the 27th.

== Aftermath ==
After the surrender of the troops, Benavides ordered the prisoners to restart the march towards Yumbel. On the morning of the 28th, Benavides ordered all the prisoners executed, which were then shot, lanced and the bodies torn apart. The city of Los Angeles was torched.

== Sources ==
- Barros Arana, Diego (1850). Estudios históricos sobre Vicente Benavides i las campañas del Sur: 1818-1822 (in Spanish). Santiago, Chile: Impr. de Julio Belin i Compañia.
- Castedo, Leopoldo (1954). Resumen de la Historia de Chile de Francisco Antonio Encina (in Spanish). Vol. 2. Santiago, Chile: Empresa Editora Zig-Zag.
- Contreras Gomez, Domingo (1942). La Ciudad de Santa María de Los Angeles (in Spanish). Vol. 1. Santiago, Chile: Empresa Editora Zig-Zag.
- Fernández, Carlos (1933). Recuerdos Históricos. Tarpellanca. (26. IX. 1820). Memorial del Ejército de Chile (in Spanish). Santiago, Chile: Imprenta Fiscal.
- Vicuña Mackenna, Benjamín (1868). La guerra a muerte: memoria sobre las últimas campañas de la Independencia de Chile (1819-1824) (in Spanish). Santiago, Chile: Imprenta Nacional. pp. 562.
- Archivo O'Higgins (in Spanish). Vol. II, XVI & XXI. Santiago, Chile: varias imprentas. 1946–1966.
