= Tubul =

Tubul may refer to:

- Tubul, a fishing village in Chile
- Tubul River
- Tubul Formation a geological formation in Chile
- Tubul, one of the gigantic elephants that support the Discworld on their backs
