= Tubul Formation =

Sedimentary formation in Chile

- Stratigraphic range: Early Pleistocene
- Type: Geological formation
- Underlies: Quaternary sediments
- Overlies: Ranquil Formation
- Thickness: >100 m (330 ft)

Lithology
- Primary: Clay-rich sandstone and silt

Location
- Coordinates: 37.8°S 73.3°W
- Approximate paleocoordinates: 37.9°S 72.8°W
- Region: Bío Bío Region
- Country: Chile

Type section
- Named for: Caleta Tubul
- Named by: Egidio Feruglio
- Year defined: 1949
- Tubul Formation (Chile)

Tubul Formation (Spanish: Formación Tubul) is an Early Pleistocene (formerly described as Middle Pliocene in 1968 and Late Pliocene in 1976) sedimentary formation located in Arauco Province in south–central Chile. Its sediments were deposited in marine conditions. It overlies unconformably the folded sedimentary formations of Ranquil (Miocene–Pliocene), Quiriquina (Late Cretaceous) and the Lebu Group (Paleocene-Eocene).

Mollusc fossils found in the formation derives from soft-bed environments (contrary to rocky coasts). Evidence from the fossil mollusc fauna of the Tubul Formation seem to indicate that local water temperatures were lower in the Pliocene than today. Waters and mollusc faunas of Magallanes Region are modern-day equivalents of Tubul Formation.

The formation was first defined by Egidio Feruglio in 1949.

== See also ==
- Arauco Peninsula
- Arauco Basin
- Cerro Ballena
