= Perseverance (ship) =

Several ships have been named Perseverance.

== British Age of Sail merchant vessels ==
Several "Age of Sail" merchant ships of the United Kingdom have been named Perseverance:

- Perseverance (1797 ship) was launched in Virginia. She made one voyage as a whaler, leaving England in February 1820 for Peru. The pirate Vicente Benavides captured her off Santa Maria island in March 1821, and later burnt her in the Tubul River. More than four of her crew were murdered.
- Perseverance (1799 ship) was built in 1797 at Stettin or Sweden and came into British hands in 1799. She made one voyage under charter to the British East India Company (EIC), and was lost in July 1803.
- Perseverance (1801 EIC ship) was launched in 1801 as an East Indiaman. She made seven voyages for the EIC before she was sold in 1819 for breaking up.
- Perseverance (1801 whaling ship) was launched on the Thames in 1801 and made 16 whaling voyages to the coast of Africa, South East Asian waters, and the Pacific before she was broken up in 1841.
- Perseverance (1807 brig), a 136-ton Australian colonial brig owned by Robert Campbell, wrecked in 1828.
- Perseverance (1850 ship) was launched in Sunderland. The Hudson's Bay Company, purchased her in 1891 and sold her in 1900. While working for The Bay, she made two voyages as a whaler in Hudson Bay and Davis Strait.

== See also ==
- RSS Perseverance (L206) (1992-2003), a logistics and landing ship operated by the Republic of Singapore Navy
- Perseverance (privateer), a privateer given a letter of marque by the Colonial Rebellion during the American Revolutionary War, that was involved in the court case Jennings v. The Perseverance
- Perseverance (1786), a steam-powered-oar propelled steam boat built by John Fitch (inventor)
- Perseverance IV (1966), a Wey barge preserved as a museum ship
- HMS Perseverance, any one of several vessels of the British Royal Navy
