= Banditry in Chile =

Form of crime in Chile

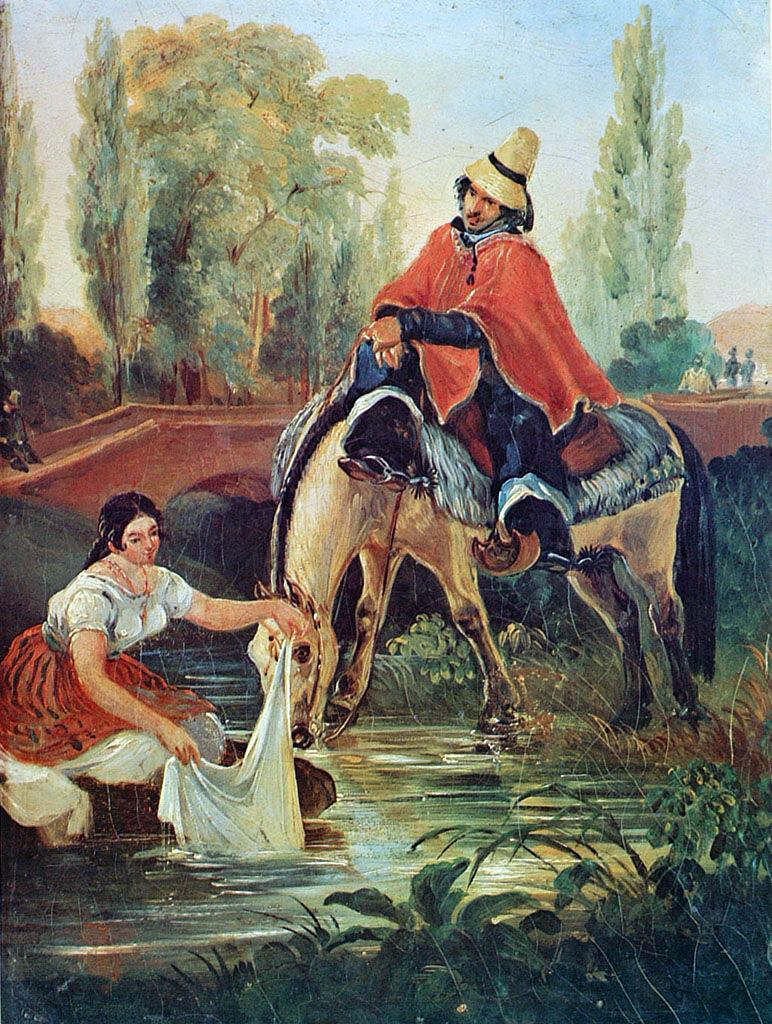
The Huaso and the Washerwoman by Mauricio Rugendas (1835)

Banditry (Spanish: bandidaje) was a considerable phenomenon in 19th century and early 20th century Central Chile and Araucanía. Many bandits achieved legendary status for their brutality and others for being regarded folk heroes. The bandits usually preyed on haciendas and their inquilinos.

The Chilean War of Independence (1810–1826) shaped an era of banditry as the war transitioned into irregular warfare known as Guerra a muerte (1819–1821) which was particularly destructive for the Biobío area and ended only to see a period of outlaw banditry occur until the late 1820s. The rise of banditry made travel dangerous; indeed, 1812 is held as the date from where travel between Concepción and Santiago was not longer safe for small groups. The Pincheira brothers, a royalist outlaw group based on indigenous territory east of the Andes, was defeated and dissolved in 1832.

In the words of Benjamín Vicuña Mackenna, banditry was a "national plague, worse than lepra or cholera." Following Chilean victories in the War of the Pacific against Peru, veterans begun to return in 1881, leading to a surge in banditry. The return of the veterans coincided with the Chilean Army's crushing of Mapuche resistance during the Occupation of Araucanía (1861–1883). This allowed opportunities for bandits and veterans-turned-bandits to immigrate to the newly opened Araucanía territory, leading to sudden rise in violence in a region that was recovering from Chilean-Mapuche warfare. Bandits that immigrated to Araucanía allied with displaced Mapuche and made cattle theft their chief business. Stolen cattle was sold in marketplaces through the region.

Thus Araucanía continued to be an insecure zone for many years. Assaults and robbery were common in the region. Because of this until the 1920s carbines, revolvers, and other firearms were common in the households of Araucanía. Banditry in Araucanía and Central Chile began to be suppressed in the late 19th century with the creation of the rural police Cuerpo de Gendarmes para las Colonias, a predecessor to Chile's main police force Carabineros de Chile. Hernán Trizano led this police force until 1905.

== Notable bandits ==
Independence Era

- José Miguel Neira, leader of Los Neirinos, patriots
- Pincheira brothers, royalists

1835–1900

- Juan de Dios López
- the Mendoza brothers
- Ciriaco Contreras
- Pancho Falcato

== See also ==
- Cueva de los Pincheira
- Mapuche conflict
- Mapuche uprising of 1881
- Pedro Ñancúpel
