= Ranquil Formation =

Miocene and Pliocene sedimentary formation in south-central Chile

- Stratigraphic range: Miocene–Pliocene
- Type: Geological formation
- Underlies: Tubul Formation
- Overlies: Lebu Group

Lithology
- Primary: Conglomerate with clay and silt matrix, breccia, sandstone, siltstone, mudstone
- Other: Conglomerate with sand matrix

Location
- Coordinates: 37.6°S 73.7°W
- Approximate paleocoordinates: 37.9°S 71.4°W
- Region: Bío Bío Region
- Country: Chile

Type section
- Named for: Caleta Ranquil
- Named by: Juan Tavera
- Year defined: 1942
- Ranquil Formation (Chile)

The Ranquil Formation (Spanish: Formación Ranquil) is a Miocene and Pliocene sedimentary formation located in Arauco Province in south–central Chile, including outcrops in Mocha Island. The formation has its greatest thicknesses in the south-west, where its sediments were largely deposited in marine conditions. It overlies unconformably sedimentary formations of the Paleocene-Eocene Lebu Group. The formation is part of the fill of Arauco Basin which is a sedimentary basin that extends south of Concepción.

Macrofossils of the formation are similar to those of Navidad (34° S) and Lacui Formations (43° S), two nearby Miocene marine formations.

The base of the Ranquil Formation is the so-called "main unconformity", which is thought to have been formed by erosion during a period of tectonic inversion.

The formation was first defined in 1942 by Juan Tavera.

== Units ==
The formation has been subdivided into five units, with the lowermost being made up of sandstone and shale, and the second lowest one being made up of a conglomerate. The middle unit is made up of mudrock and massive sandstone. At some places the middle unit is overlain by a unit made up of sandstone with thin layers of conglomerate and sandstone that has been bioturbated. The uppermost unit include a breccia and the so-called Huenteguapi sandstone. The sediments of Huenteguapi sandstone evidences that a megatsunami struck the coast of south–central Chile in the Pliocene, which has been linked to the hypothetical Eltanin impact.

== Fossil content ==
The Ranquil Formation contains the following trace fossils: Zoophycos, Chondrites, Phycosiphon, Nereites missouriensis, Lockeiasiliquaria, Parataenidium, Ophiomorpha, Rhizocorallium and possibly also Psammichnites.

== See also ==
- Arauco Peninsula – Peninsula in Chile
