= Juan Tavera =

Chilean geologist and paleontologist

- Born: 1917
- Died: 1991 (aged 73–74)
- Citizenship: Chile
- Known for: Study of the formations of Navidad, Arauco and Algarrobo
- Scientific career
- Fields: Geology, paleontology
- Workplaces: University of Chile; Departamento de Minas del Estado

Juan Tavera (1917–1991) was a Chilean geologist and paleontologist. His most important work was on the marine invertebrate fossils of the formations of Algarrobo, Arauco and Navidad. Tavera's work contributed to an increased understanding of the stratigraphy of Chile, for example by defining Ranquil Formation in 1942.

Along with Charles Darwin, Juan Brüggen and Gustav Steinmann he is one of the prominent geologists to have studied Navidad Formation in Central Chile.

The species Paulckella taverai is named after him.
