= Perseverance =

Perseverance most commonly refers to:

- Perseverance (rover), a planetary rover landed on Mars by NASA
- Persistence (psychology)
- Psychological resilience

Perseverance may also refer to:

== Geography ==
- Perseverance, Queensland, a locality in Australia
- Perseverance Island, Seychelles
- Perseverance Mountain, Canada
- De Volharding, Jislum (lit. 'The Perseverance'), a wind mill in the Netherlands
- Perseverance Tavern, a pub in Cape Town, South Africa
- The Perseverance, a pub in London, England
- Perseverance School, a Christian institution in South Africa

== Music ==
- Perseverance (Hatebreed album)
- Perseverance (Percee P album)
- "Perseverance" (song), on Terrorvision's 1996 album Regular Urban Survivors
- Perseverance Records, an American record label

== Theology ==
- Perseverance of the saints, a Protestant Christian teaching
- Assurance (theology)

== Vehicles ==
- Perseverance (ship), various watercraft so named
- Perseverance (Rainhill Trials), an early Scottish steam locomotive prototype
- Natal Railway 4-4-0T Perseverance, a series of four South African steam locomotives

== Other ==
- Perseverance (solitaire), a traditional playing-card game
- Brock Lesnar (born 1977; ring name: Perseverance), American wrestler and MMA fighter
- The Perseverance, a collection of poetry by Raymond Antrobus
- 975 Perseverantia, a Koronian asteroid
- Perseverance Theatre, a professional theater company in Juneau, Alaska
- Belief perseverance, in psychology
