= Navidad Formation =

Marine Neogene sedimentary formation in Central Chile

- Stratigraphic range: Early-Mid Miocene
- Type: Geological formation
- Underlies: Licancheu Formation
- Overlies: Paleozoic granitic basement Punta Tocopalma Formation
- Thickness: 100–200 m (330–660 ft)

Lithology
- Primary: Sandstone, siltstone, conglomerate
- Other: Coquina

Location
- Coordinates: 34.0°S 71.8°W
- Approximate paleocoordinates: 34.2°S 69.7°W
- Region: Valparaíso Region; O'Higgins Region
- Country: Chile

Type section
- Named for: Navidad
- Named by: Darwin
- Year defined: 1846
- Navidad Formation (Chile)

Navidad Formation (Spanish: Formación Navidad) is a marine Neogene sedimentary formation located in Central Chile. The formation is known for its diverse and abundant fossil record and is considered the reference unit for the marine Neogene in Chile. Originally described by Charles Darwin in 1846 the formation has attracted the attention of numerous prominent geologists and paleontologists since then. As a key formation Navidad has been subject to a series of differing interpretations and scientific disputes over time.

== History ==
Charles Darwin saw the formation in September 1834 during the second voyage of HMS Beagle. He became the first to describe it 1846 when he published his book Geological Observations on South America in 1846 and it was named by Darwin after the nearby town of Navidad. In this book Darwin calls the formation "Formation of Navidad" and "Sandstone Formation at Navidad". There are no signs of that Darwin would have attempted to make a formal definition of the formation.

...the next point at which I landed was at Navidad, 160 miles north of Concepcion, and 60 miles south of Valparaiso. The cliffs here are about 800 feet in height : they consist, wherever I could examine them, of fine-grained, yellowish, earthy sandstones, with ferruginous veins, and with concretions of hard calcareous sandstone. [...] The sandstone contains fragments of wood, either in the state of lignite or partially silicified, shark's teeth, and shells in great abundance...

— Charles Darwin

Early fossil descriptions from Navidad Formation were those of George Sowerby in Geological Observations on South America (1846) and by Rodolfo Amando Philippi (1887).

Gustav Steinmann redefined the Navidad Formation in 1895, then called Piso Navidad, by giving it a Lower Tertiary age and spanning much of south-central Chile. In 1934 Juan Brüggen separated Piso Concepción from Steinmanns Piso Navidad after showing there was a discordance between them. Humberto Fuenzalida published research on fossils of the formation in 1950–1951.

Juan Tavera further narrowed the age of the formation in 1968 and 1979 by proposing a Burdigalian (Lower Miocene) age for Navidad, Lincancheo and Rapel which were then the three subunits of Navidad Formation. Tavera's 1979 subdivision scheme for Navidad Formation remained popular until it was superseded in 2006 by a new one.

== Outcrops and surface morphology ==
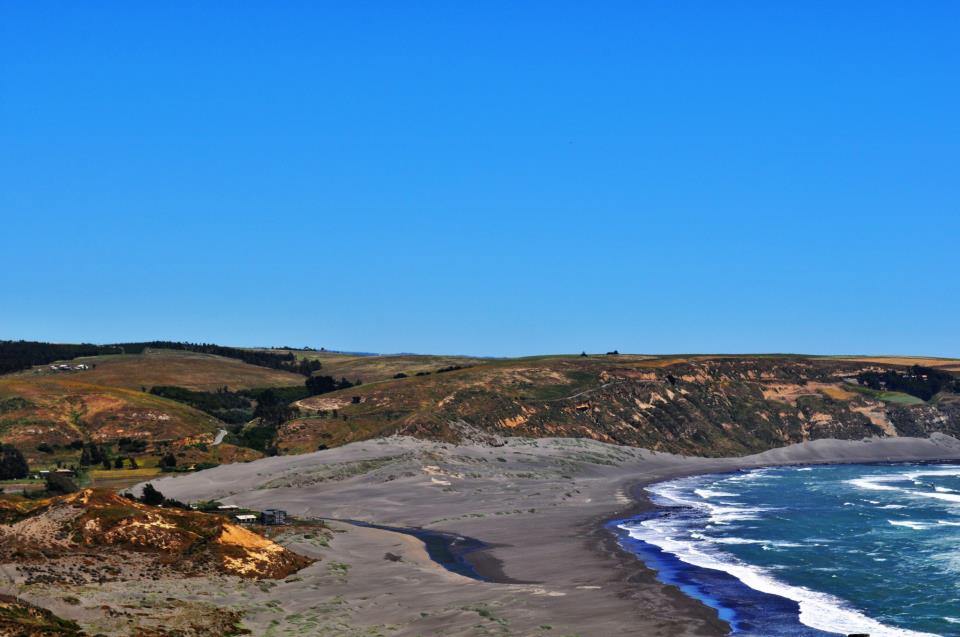
Southward view towards the mouth of Rapel River. Navidad outcrops can be seen above the beach in the right of the image.

Navidad Formation is located in the Chilean Coast Range in Central Chile at the latitudes of 33°00' S–34°30' S. The formation crops out more-less continuously along coastal bluffs displaying well-preserved exposures. The coastal exposures extends from the vicinities of San Antonio in the north to Boca Pupuya in the south over a length of 16 km. Morphologically the coastal zone near the formation has been divided into four distinct zones: a coastal platform of rocky outcrops and sand beaches, marine terraces dipping gently towards the sea, dissected coastal plain at the mouth of Rapel River and fluvial terraces in the northern and southern shores of Rapel River.

== Stratigraphy and lithology ==
The formation rests above both an Upper Cretaceous formation called Punta Tocopalma Formation and the Paleozoic granitic basement. It lies below Licancheu Formation to which it has a concordant contact to. The formation has a thickness of 100 to 200 meters. The sedimentary rocks that make up the formation includes a basal conglomerate stratigraphically followed by intercalated sandstone and siltstone with smaller occurrences of conglomerate and coquina.

There are more than one subdivision scheme for the stratigraphy of the formation. A scheme made by Juan Tavera in 1979 that was by 2005 the most used compromises tree members Navidad, Licancheo and Rapel. A new scheme proposed in 2006 elevated Tavera's sub-units Licancheo (renamed Licancheu) and Rapel to formations leaving the new definition of Navidad Formation as the former sub-unit Navidad. The rationale for subdividing Tavera's Navidad Formation was that the sub-units were separated by regional discontinuities.

The stratotype of the formation is the coastal bluff west of Punta Perro. The stratopype does not coincide with the original description by Darwin.

The sediments of the formation include detrital pyroxene, amphibole, garnet, zircon and other heavy minerals. Pyroxene is the most common heavy mineral in the lower sections of Navidad Formation. Part of the sediments are believed to have originated from the basement of the Chilean Coast Range based on the affinities of garnet with the coastal lithologies. Analysis of amphiboles and pyroxenes have led to the conclusion that they and other sediments originate from volcanic and subvolcanic rocks from the Central Valley and the Andean Cordillera. Over-all three erosion-and-deposition events have been distinguished in Navidad Formation.

== Fossil record ==
The formation contains a great variety of fossils. Among the macrofossils there are remnants from sharks, crustaceans and gastropods. Among microfossils there are ostracodes and foraminifera. In addition there are fossils of leaves and pollen. The teeth of the shark Odontaspis ferox have been identified in the formation.

=== Crustaceans ===
Fossils of the marine crab genera Cancer, Hepatus, Pilumnus, Pinnotheres, Trichopeltarion, Callianassa, Pinnixa and Proterocarcinus have been reported from Navidad Formation. Navidad Formation host two of the first fossil crab species to be described from Chile: Cancer tyros and Pinnotheres promaucanus both described by Rodolfo Amando Philippi in 1887. Notably, the type specimen of Pinnotheres promaucanus has presumably been lost at the Chilean National Museum of Natural History.

Ostracod species identified in Navidad Formation numbered 28 by 1978.

=== Molluscs ===
Gastropod shells are the most common macrofossils of Navidad Formation. A large number of these shells are remarkably well preserved. The mollusc fossil fauna of Navidad Formation is remarkably similar fossil faunas of the same age found in Peru. Some of the gastropod species found in Navidad Formation are Miltha vidali, Acanthina katzi, Olivancillaria claneophila, Testallium cepa, Ficus distans, Eucrassatella ponderosa, Glycymeris ibariformis and Glycymeris colchaguensis.

=== Flora ===
There are fossil spores, pollen, wood, cuticles and fresh water algae in the formation. Pollen and spore associations are dominated by land species and reflect that land flora was of both Gondwana and Neotropical affinities. In a 2011 study Barreda et al. identified a total of 65 morphospecies of pollen and spores. More specifically these consisted of at least 42 angiosperms, 14 pteridophytes, seven gymnosperms and two bryophytes. The dominant gymnosperms are the Podocarpaceae while the angiosperms lack any dominant family. Charcoal found together with pumice is thought to indicate that wildfires ignited by volcanic eruptions were common on land where Mediterranean climate prevailed in the Miocene as well as today.

=== Trace fossils ===
The trace fossils representing the ichnogenera of Zoophycos isp. and Chondrites isp. can be found in Navidad Formation.

== Scientific controversy ==
Over the years different age estimates for Navidad Formation have been proposed and led to a substantial debate.

Based on a biostratrigraphic analysis Encinas et al. (2008b) suggested a Tortonian to Zanclean (Late Miocene–Early Pliocene) age for Navidad Formation. They further suggested that Oligocene–Early Miocene shark teeth that occur in basal conglomerate are reworked material originating at another formation that re–sedimented in Navidad Formation. The formation was interpreted as including both deep marine and shallow marine depositional environments.

In 2013 Gutiérrez et al. published an article in Andean Geology claiming an Early to Middle Miocene age for Navidad Formation. Further, Gutiérrez et al. (2013) disagreed with Encina et al.'s (2008b) suggestion of a deep marine depositional environment for Navidad Formation proposing a shallow marine environment instead. This prompted a response from Encina and his associates (Finger et al., 2013) contesting elements of these claims but stressing it is true that some of the formation is of shallow marine origin and that at least part of the formation is of Early Miocene origin. In their comment Finger et al. (2013) revealed that previous identification of foraminera was erroneous as was also the Late Miocene–Early Pleistocene age estimate based on incorrect identification of foraminifera. Gutiérrez and his associates defended their findings in a reply in 2013 and the exchange continued in 2014.

Issues of debate on the age of Navidad Formation

Issue	Gutierrez et al. 2013; Le Roux et al. 2013; Le Roux et al., 2014	Finger et al. 2013; Encinas et al. 2014
Age of index species	Planktonic foraminifer index species indicating Late Miocene to Early Pliocene age "must have appeared in the SE Pacific earlier than elsewhere". Foraminifer interpretations have shown to not be fully reliable.	Appearance of planktonic foraminifer index species in the South East Pacific earlier than elsewhere is "implausible". It is admitted that earlier age estimations for Navidad Formation from planktonic foraminifers have been flawed.
Strontium stratigraphy	All except one of the molluscs dated by Encinas (2006) with strontium are of Oligocene–Early Miocene age. The single outlier displaying a Late Miocene age is an oyster that is likely not suitable for strontium dating since oysters are usually found on brackish waters not reflecting the true world ocean strontium levels. "Although the Sr dates may not be precise due to neomorphism, we do not consider this to be a major problem in the light of the overwhelmingly Early Miocene ages for the lower member and Middle Miocene age for the upper member".	Caution is needed. Strontium dating has been shown to contradict sometimes the stratigraphical order including some of Gutiérrez et al.'s (2013) stratigraphical data.
Bradleya normani occurrence	"Bradleya normani is a very rare species, so it is not surprising that it had not yet been found in older strata".	The ostracod Bradleya normani is not known to appear earlier than in the Late Miocene, therefore if Navidad Formation is of Oligocene–Early Miocene age its then anomalous occurrence would require an explanation.

Issues of debate on the depositional environment of Navidad Formation

Issue	Gutierrez et al. 2013; Le Roux et al. 2013; Le Roux et al., 2014	Finger et al. 2013; Encinas et al. 2014
Depositional environment	Fossil wave ripples, preservation of delicate land insect remains and leaves and an abundance of land plant pollen compared to marine plant pollen indicates that "Navidad Formation represents a shallow coastal to outer shelf environment". "The occurrence of rocky shoreline mollusc species" in what is claimed to be "deep water sandstones" is unlikely.	Navidad Formation reflects deep marine and shallow marine environments. The formation show plenty of sedimentological features that "are characteristic of gravity flow deposits typical of deep marine environments". "The occurrence of abundant and well-preserved terrestrial plant debris (leaves, woody fragments, and pollen) is not uncommon in deep-marine turbiditic systems". It is admitted that parts of the formation might represent shallow environments but a shallow marine environment can not explain "the repetitive, abrupt changes observed in a diversity of facies that characterize the Navidad Formation".
Foraminifer paleobathymetry	Encina et al.'s (2008b) estimation of depth based on foraminifera is problematic since paleobathymetry based on fossil benthonic foraminifers is most reliable after the late Middle Miocene and Navidad Formation is older than that.	"Paleobathymetric interpretations [using foraminifera] are assumed to be fairly reliable for at least the last 25 Myr".
Inferences from trace fossils	"Ophiomorpha nodosa, Skolithos linearis, Conichnus conicus, Macaronichnus segregates, and Thalassinoides isp.", are "considered to represent an upper shoreface environment". Zoophycus isp. and Chondrites isp. are "generally considered to be typical of the continental slope, it does not necessarily indicate water depths much greater than 150-200 m".	"Skolithos ichnofacies, is indeed typical of shallow marine environments, but it is also common in deep marine environments where it reflects particular conditions such as high energy". The Zoophycos ichnofacies of Navidad Formation is unlikely to reflect a shallow marine environment "as they typically occur in siltstones with abundant planktic foraminifers, indicating an environment farther offshore".
Turbidity currents	"...hyperpycnal flows could have been responsible for depositing some of the sandstones at Navidad, but such flows do not necessarily take place in deep water."	That sediment matrix in shells is the same as the surrounding sediments is not "evidence of an in situ molluscan fauna, but it only indicates that the fossils were not reworked from older strata." Sediment and fossils can transported together to deep water environments by gravity flows in such way that delicate plant remnants and body parts are preserved and matrix and surrounding sediment is the same.

== See also ==
- Cerro Ballena
- Coquimbo Formation
- Lacui Formation
- Ranquil Formation
- Santo Domingo Formation
