= Feruglio =

Feruglio may refer to:

== People ==
- Egidio Feruglio, Italian geologist (1897–1954)
- Egidio Feruglio (cyclist), Italian cyclist (1921–1981)
- Antonio Feruglio, bishop of Vicenza (d. 1911)
- Manlio Feruglio, Italian soldier (1892–1917)

== Other ==
- 73442 Feruglio, an asteroid
