= Biropristis =

Biropristis Temporal range: Maastrichtian

Scientific classification
- Domain: Eukaryota
- Kingdom: Animalia
- Phylum: Chordata
- Class: Chondrichthyes
- Subclass: Elasmobranchii
- Order: Rajiformes
- Suborder: †Sclerorhynchoidei
- Genus: †Biropristis; Suárez & Cappetta 2004
- Species: †B. landbecki

Binomial name
- †Biropristis landbecki Suárez & Cappetta 2004

Extinct genus of sawfish-like shark

Biropristis is an extinct genus of sclerorhynchoid from the Late Cretaceous epoch of the Cretaceous period. The genus is named in honor of Dr. Lajos Biró-Bagózcky who studied the formation in which it was found. It is known from a single species, B. landbecki. It is known solely from isolated oral teeth found in the Maastrichtian-aged Quiriquina Formation of central Chile. The species is named for Luis Landbeck who found the first fossils at the locality in which it was found.
