= HMS Perseverance =

Several British ships have been named Perseverance

== Royal Navy ==
Three ships of the Royal Navy have been named HMS Perseverance:

- HMS Perseverance (1781) was a 35-gun fifth-rate frigate launched in 1781, the nameship of the Perseverance class. She was sold in 1823.
- HMS Perseverance (1850) was a wooden screw discovery sloop, previously the civilian Free Trade. She was purchased in 1850 and briefly named HMS Perseverance. She was renamed HMS Intrepid later in 1850 and was abandoned in the Arctic in 1854.
- HMS Perseverance (1854) was an iron screw troopship, ordered as the Russian Sobraon before the Crimean War and purchased by the Royal Navy from its builders in 1854. She was wrecked in 1860.

== Admiralty ==
Also three large Admiralty tugs:

- Perseverance (1875) was a wood-hulled paddle tug for Devonport dockyard. She was broken up in 1911
- Perseverance (1883) was the former paddle tug Meteor, renamed in 1914. She was broken up in 1923
- Perseverance (1931) was a screw salvage tug Imara of the Tanganyika Government, purchased in 1932. She was sold for breaking up in 1958

== See also ==
- Perseverance (ship)
