= Guerra a muerte =

Warfare

- Part of the Chilean War of Independence
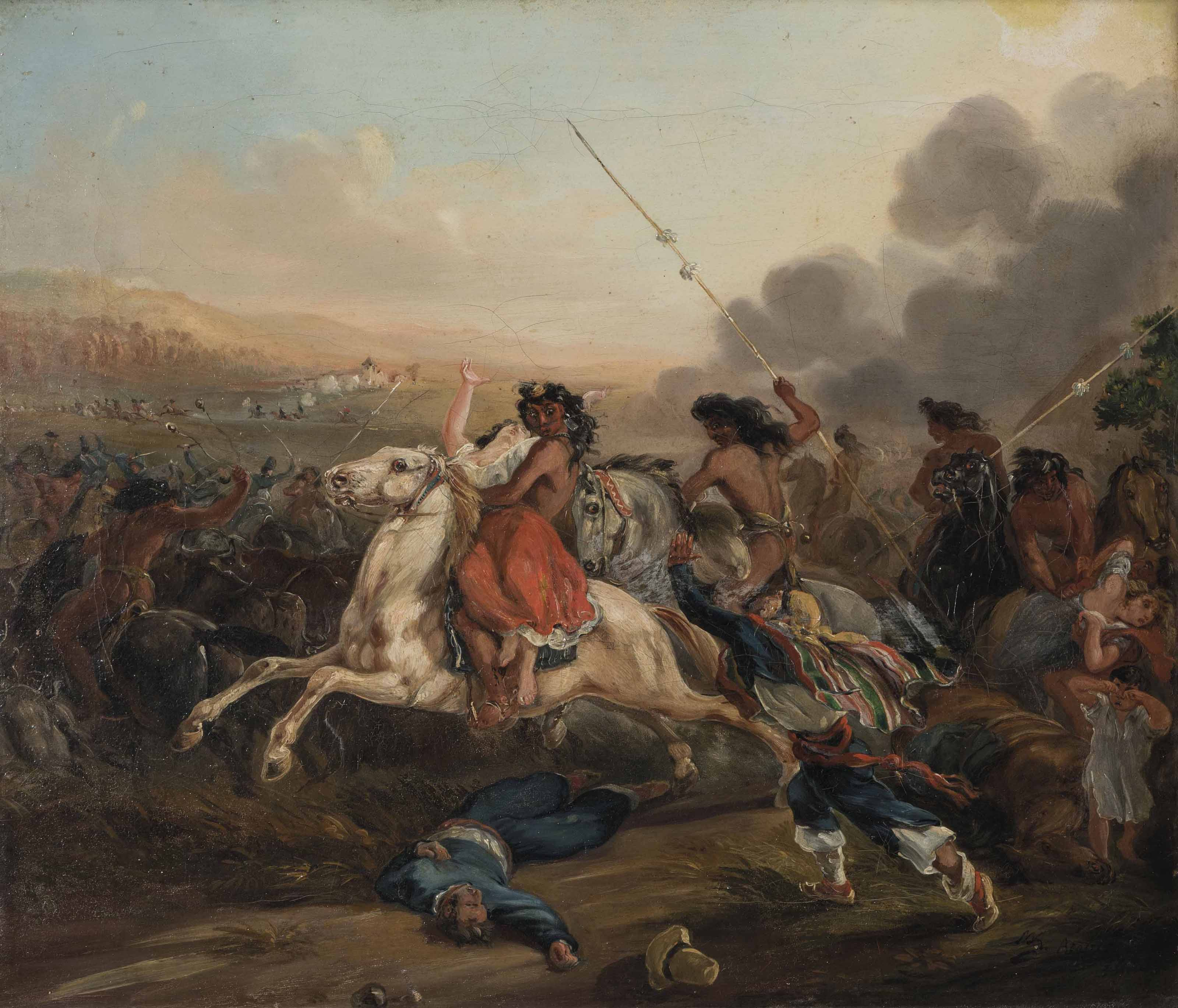
- El malón (1834) by Johann Moritz Rugendas
Date	1819–1824 (extended until 1827 or 1832)
Location	La Frontera, the Araucanía and the southern of the central valley (present-day Chile), and the Neuquén Basin (present-day Argentina)
Result	Patriot victory
Territorial changes	Definitive Chilean occupation of the towns and forts of La Frontera

Belligerents
Patriots: Chile Mapuche allies: Abajinos; Pehuenches	Royalists: (Spain) Rebels from the province of Concepción Mapuche allies: Arribanos; Boroanos; Pehuenches; Costinos; Huilliches

Commanders and leaders
(Chile) Ramón Freire; (Chile) Joaquín Prieto; (Chile) P. A. del Alcázar (executed); (Chile) Pedro N. Victoriano; (Chile) Juan de Dios Rivera; (Chile) Pedro R. Arriagada; (Chile) Manuel Bulnes; (Chile) José M. Borgoño; (Chile) Pedro Barnechea; Juan L. Colipí; Venancio Coñoepán; Luis Melipán	(Spain) Vicente Benavides (executed); (Spain) Juan M. Pico (executed); (Spain) Juan A. Ferrebú (executed); (Spain) José M. Zapata †; (Spain) Vicente Bocardo (surrendered); (Spain) Miguel Senosiaín (surrendered); (Spain) Pincheira brothers: Juan A. Pincheira †; Santos Pincheira †; Pablo Pincheira (executed); José A. Pincheira (surrendered); Juan F. Mariluán (surrendered); J. Mangin Hueno; Curiqueo †; Martín Toriano; Juan Neculmán †

Strength
(Chile) Chilean Army and militias Mapuche warriors	(Spain) Royalist semi-regular army and montoneras Mapuche warriors

Guerra a muerte (lit. English: War to the death) is a term coined by Benjamín Vicuña Mackenna and used in Chilean historiography to describe the irregular, no-quarter warfare that broke out in 1819 during the Chilean War of Independence.

After the royalists had been expelled from all cities and ports north of the Bio-Bio River, Vicente Benavides organized royalist resistance in La Frontera with the aid of Mapuche chiefs. The aid of the Mapuches was vital to the royalists since they had lost control of all cities and ports north of Valdivia. Most Mapuches valued the treaties they had with the Spanish authorities, while many other Mapuches regarded the matter with indifference and played both sides against each other. The Pincheira brothers, a future outlaw group, served Benavides in the Guerra a muerte by defending the Cordillera.

As result of the Guerra a muerte the government of nascent republic begun to distrust the Franciscan missionaries of Chillán who were regarded as representatives of the old regime. This led to the recruitment of a new contingent of missionaries for Chillán in the 1830s.

== See also ==
- Banditry in Chile
- Parliament of Tapihue (1825)

== Sources ==
- Vicuña Mackenna, Benjamín (1868). La guerra a muerte: memoria sobre las últimas campañas de la Independencia de Chile, 1819-1824 (in Spanish). Santiago, Chile: Imprenta Nacional.
- Barros Arana, Diego (1892). Historia jeneral de Chile (in Spanish). Vol. XII. Santiago, Chile: Imprenta Cervantes.
- Barros Arana, Diego (1894). Historia jeneral de Chile (in Spanish). Vol. XIII. Santiago, Chile: Imprenta Cervantes.
- Barros Arana, Diego (1897). Historia jeneral de Chile (in Spanish). Vol. XIV. Santiago, Chile: Imprenta Cervantes.
- Barros Arana, Diego (1897). Historia jeneral de Chile (in Spanish). Vol. XV. Santiago, Chile: Imprenta Cervantes.
- Barros Arana, Diego (1902). Historia jeneral de Chile (in Spanish). Vol. XVI. Santiago, Chile: Imprenta Cervantes.
- Barros Arana, Diego (1850). Estudios históricos sobre Vicente Benavides i las campañas del Sur, 1818-1822 (in Spanish). Santiago, Chile: Imprenta de Julio Belin y Compañía.
- Gay, Claude (1854). Historia física y política de Chile (in Spanish). Vol. VI. París, Francia: Imprenta de E. Thunot y Cía.
- Gay, Claude (1871). Historia física y política de Chile (in Spanish). Vol. VIII. París, Francia: Imprenta de E. Thunot y Cía.
- Guevara, Tomás (1902). Historia de la civilización de Araucanía: los araucanos y la república (in Spanish). Vol. III. Santiago, Chile: Imprenta Barcelona.
- Campos Harriet, Fernando (1958). Los defensores del Rey (in Spanish). Santiago, Chile: Editorial Andrés Bello.
- Ejército de Chile (1980). Historia del Ejército de Chile: el ejército y la organización de la república (1817-1840) (in Spanish). Vol. III. Santiago, Chile: Estado Mayor General del Ejército.
- Ejército de Chile (1997). Historia militar de Chile (in Spanish). Vol. I (3rd ed.). Santiago, Chile: Estado Mayor General del Ejército.
- Riquelme Cortés, Emilia (July–December 2020). "Tropas realistas en la Araucanía durante la guerra a muerte (1819-1824): un espacio de movilización indígena y popular". Claves. Revista de Historia (in Spanish). 6 (11). Montevideo, Uruguay: 105–137. ISSN 2393-6584.
- Ferrando Keun, Ricardo (2012) [1986]. Y así nació La Frontera...: conquista, guerra, ocupación, pacificación. 1550-1900 (in Spanish) (2nd ed.). Temuco, Chile: Ediciones Universidad Católica de Temuco. ISBN 978-956-7019-83-0.
- Bengoa, José (1996) [1985]. Historia del pueblo mapuche (siglo XIX y XX) (in Spanish) (5th ed.). Santiago, Chile: Ediciones Sur.
- López Parra, María Paz (December 2019). "La guerra a muerte: las campañas de la consolidación de la independencia en el sur de Chile, 1819–1832". Revista de Historia Militar (in Spanish) (17). Chile: 20–25. ISSN 0719-4641.
- Téllez Lúgaro, Eduardo (2016). "Espacios geoétnicos y confederaciones territoriales de la Araucanía en tiempos de la guerra a muerte". Revista de Historia Indígena (in Spanish) (3). Santiago, Chile: 53–76.
- Manara, Carla G. (2009). Circuitos fronterizos, malones y redes de poder en la órbita revolucionaria (PDF) (Thesis) (in Spanish). Argentina: XII Jornadas Interescuelas/Departamentos de Historia. Departamento de Historia, Facultad de Humanidades y Centro Regional Universitario Bariloche. Universidad Nacional del Comahue, San Carlos de Bariloche.
- Lara, Horacio (1889). Crónica de la Araucania: descubrimiento i conquista, pacificacion definitiva i campaña de Villa-rica (in Spanish). Vol. II. Santiago, Chile: Imprenta El Progreso.
