= Parliament of Tapihue =

The Parliament of Tapihue of 1825 was a diplomatic agreement between fourteen Mapuche reductions and the newly established Republic of Chile. The Mapuche reductions were represented by the lonko Juan Mariluán and the republic by Colonel Pedro Barnachea. The agreement was aimed to end the Guerra a muerte conflict that had grown out from the Chilean War of Independence. It was also a means for the Chilean government to establish relations with Mapuches.

The parliament did not prosper for a long time, since Mariluán himself rebelled against Chile in the fall of 1826, contravening several of the provisions of the agreement.
