= Hernán Trizano =

Chilean Army officer

Hernán Trizano Avezzana
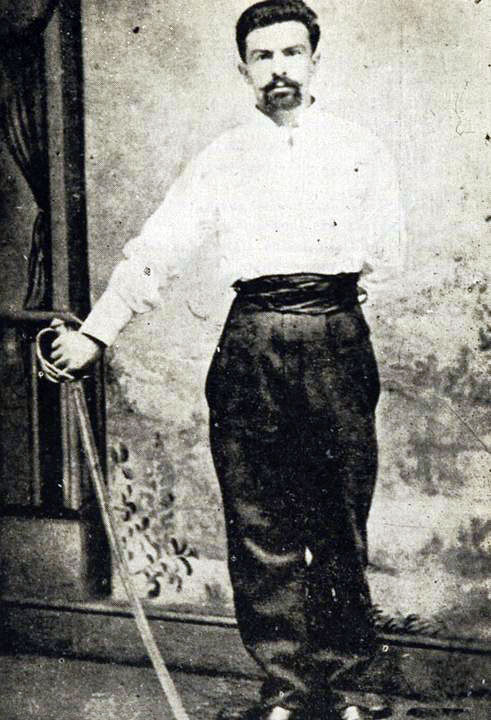
- Born: 1860; Valparaíso, Chile
- Died: December 16, 1926 (aged 65–66); Temuco, Chile
- Military career
- Allegiance: Chile
- Branch: Army
- Conflicts: War of the Pacific

Hernán Trizano Avezzana (Valparaíso, 1860 - Temuco, 1926) was a Chilean Army officer who led the Gendarmes para las Colonias an army regiment that acted as rural police in Southern Chile. Trizano led this policing force until 1905.

== See also ==
- Banditry in Chile
