= Hersilia (1819 ship) =

History

United States
- Owner: William A. Fanning, James P. Sheffield, Ephraim Williams
- Operator: James P. Sheffield
- Builder: Christopher Leeds
- Launched: 1819
- Acquired: 1819
- Fate: Destroyed by pirates in Chile

General characteristics
- Class & type: Brig
- Tons burthen: 130 (bm)
- Length: 68 ft (21 m)
- Beam: 22 ft 8 in (6.91 m)
- Depth of hold: 10 ft 1 in (3.07 m)

The Hersilia was an American merchant vessel and the first from the United States to visit the South Shetland Islands. During its second voyage it was seized by Vicente Benavides, a Royalist commander in the Chilean War of Independence, who ordered its destruction late in 1821.

== Construction ==
It was built by Christopher Leeds in 1819 at a dry dock in Mystic, Connecticut. The vessel was jointly owned between eight men that collectively had extensive maritime and commercial experience. Among them were Edmund Fanning's son, William A. Fanning, along with Ephraim Williams and its captain James P. Sheffield.

== First voyage ==
The Hersilia departed from Stonington, Connecticut, for the Antarctic Ocean in July 1819. Over a decade later Edmund Fanning claimed that it was sent to go exploring the southern Pacific Ocean. However this has been challenged by later historians, who question Fanning's assertion. Sheffield served as its captain, W. Fanning as supercargo and Nathaniel Palmer as second mate. The Hersilia stopped in the Falkland Islands to procure much needed water and food supplies. It is uncertain the precise date the Hersilia reached the South Shetland Islands, but it was primarily stationed at Hersilia Cove on Rugged Island. An estimated 9,000 Antarctic fur seal were killed by the crew for their valuable pelts over the span of two weeks. Afterwards, the Hersilia returned to Stonington in early 1820.

== Second voyage ==
Back in its Connecticut home port, the crew of the Hersilia quickly spread news of the recently discovered South Shetland Islands. The Fanning family organised a small fleet with fellow Stonington merchants to exploit the large seal populations there. Sheffield remained as captain and returned to the islands late in 1820. The Hersilia departed for Chile in February 1821 with a hold of over 15,000 seal furs. It was anchored at Santa María Island by May.

The crew was captured on the evening of the 14th by men loyal to Vicente Benavides. Benavides was a royalist guerrilla leader in the Chilean War of Independence and was based out of the nearby Arauco. After sailing the Hersilia to the mouth of the Carampangue River, the majority of the sealers were taken to Arauco as prisoners. Benavides distributed the captured sealers among his own men, "one to each officer, to wait on, and serve them at their quarters, or in their families, as a menial slave..." Sheffield and another American captain were utilised by Benavides to write promissory notes to help finance his campaign.

The Hersilia was refitted by Benavides to serve as a warship. Its hold of seal pelts were taken to shore, and several cannon were brought aboard. With a complement of an approximately 100 men, the Hersilia sailed for the Chiloé Island settlement of Castro. While there additional funds and supplies for Benavides was ordered. Near Arauco the vessel became beached, with the Americans commanded to free the vessel. On the evening of September 26, the majority of them escaped under Sheffield on two whaling boats for Santa María Island. Storms and high gales kept them detained there for five days, with the men leaving for Valparaíso the following day. The Americans avoided landing on the coast until further north of the Bay of Concepción to avoid any pursuers. Starting at Maule they went overland and were given much needed foodstuffs by Chileans throughout their journey.

When the Americans finally reached Valparaíso, Sheffield held a conversation with the British commodore in charge of the South America Station, Sir Thomas Hardy. Informed of their months of captivity and abuse by Benavides, Hardy agreed to aid the Americans. A ship would be sent to Arauco so as to retrieve the Hersilia and the remaining Americans still there. The British warship HMS Conway was selected for the mission, with Sheffield sailing on board. When they reached Arauco, however, the British and Americans found the settlement ablaze. Soldiers loyal to the Republic of Chile had fought Benavides and forced him to retreat into the countryside. Prior to leaving, his troops set fire to the Hersilia and various buildings in town, including the storehouses containing the seal pelts previously gathered by Sheffield's men. The remaining Americans that didn't previously escape the Royalist camp were found and rejoined their compatriots. Once back at Valparaíso, the Americans arranged for passage back to the United States. Notably, the British officers gave funds to make this possible.

== Legacy ==
Hersilia Cove in the South Shetland Islands is named after the vessel.

== Bibliography ==
- Fanning, Edmund (1833), Voyages Round the World, New York: Collins & Hannay
- Fanning, Edmund (1838), Voyages to the South Seas, Indian and Pacific Oceans (4th ed.), New York: William H. Vermilye
- Hurd, Duane Hamilton, ed. (1882), History of New London County, Connecticut, Philadelphia: J. B. Lippencott & Co.
- Stackpole, Edouard (1955), The voyage of the Huron and the Huntress, Mystic, CT: Marine Historical Association, INC.
