= Cueva de los Pincheira =

Coordinates: 36.896°S 71.551°W

Cueva de los Pincheira is rock shelter located about 65 kilometres (40 mi) southeast of Chillán, in Ñuble Region, Central Chile. The rock shelter is famous for being a hideout of the Pincheira brothers, a royalist outlaw gang. During high season there are reenactments in the cave.

The rock shelter lies in the foothills of the Andes near Laguna Huemul. In the 1820s the rock shelter was one of the Pincheira brothers' main encampments together with other locations also close to Chillán. Up to a thousand people are reported to have gathered at the site during the heyday of the Pincheira brothers.

Local lore says that a white mule appears during the night in the small waterfall of the rock shelter. Allegedly, this mule shows the route to the hidden treasures of the Pincheira brothers. It is also said that just before morning a cart can be heard near the rock shelter; additionally, there are sayings that the cries of women have been heard together with the cart. The sayings explain that these are the cries of the women kept captive by the outlaws.
