= Arauco Peninsula =

Peninsula in Chile

Coordinates: 37.265263°S 73.577295°W

The Arauco Peninsula (Spanish: península de Arauco), is a peninsula in Southern Chile located in the homonymous Arauco Province. It projects northwest into the Pacific Ocean. The peninsula is located west of Cordillera de Nahuelbuta. Geologically it is a forearc high.

== See also ==
- Arauco Basin
- Ranquil Formation
