= Arauco Basin =

Sediment-filled depression in Chile

- Cuenca de Arauco
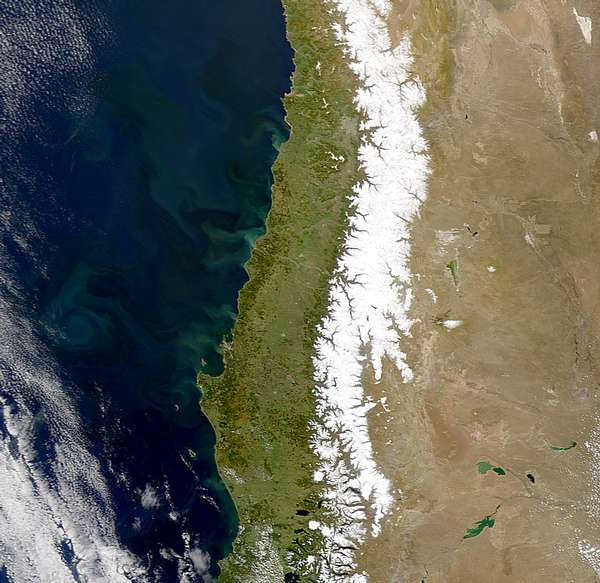
- Arauco Basin is located in the westernmost part of central Chile

- Location within Chile
- Coordinates: 37°05′S 73°10′W
- Etymology: Arauco Peninsula
- Location: Southwestern South America
- Country: Chile
- State: Bío Bío Region

Characteristics
- On/Offshore: Both
- Boundaries: Accretionary prism of the Chile trench (W); Accretionary complex intruded by the Coastal Batholith of central Chile (E)
- Area: ~8,000 km^{2} (3,100 sq mi)

Hydrology
- Sea: Eastern Pacific Ocean

Geology
- Basin type: Forearc basin
- Orogeny: Andean
- Age: Maastrichtian-Pliocene
- Stratigraphy: Stratigraphy
- Field: Chilean coal

The Arauco Basin (Spanish: Cuenca de Arauco) is a sediment-filled depression –a sedimentary basin– in south-central Chile. In the context of plate tectonics it is classified as a forearc basin. The basin has an approximate area of 8,000 square kilometres (3,100 sq mi) and at its deeper parts the surface of its sedimentary fill reaches 200 metres (660 ft) below sea-level. The basin is interpreted as being part of an uplifted part of the continental shelf. To the west it bounds an active accretionary prism that lies next to the Chile trench and to the east it bounds metamorphic basement representing a fossil Paleozoic accretionary complex that has been intruded by the Coastal Batholith of central Chile.

Traditionally the centre of coal mining in Chile, large-scale coal mining in Arauco Basin ended in the 1990s. Given a high density of geological faults that have displaced the coal beds and the thin nature of these (less than one metre) mining activity in Arauco Basin has proven difficult to mechanize.

== Stratigraphy ==
The sedimentary fill has a maximum thickness of ca. 2,000 metres (6,600 ft). Parts of the basin are on land in Arauco Peninsula where Eocene coal-bearing rocks of marine and continental origin and Eocene age are exposed. On top of these rocks and toward the centre of the peninsula Miocene and Pliocene sedimentary rocks exists. Towards the east Cretaceous sedimentary rocks crop out. The sedimentary formations defined in Arauco Basin include:

Sedimentary formations of Arauco Basin
Name		Environment	Age	Lithology
Tubul Formation		Marine	Pliocene	Sandstone, siltstone
Ranquil Formation		Marine	Miocene–Pliocene	Conglomerate, sandstone, siltstone, shale
Lebu Group	Millongue Formation (Note: What was previously known as Caleta Viel Formation is now considered to be the roof of Millongue Formation.)	Marine and continental	Eocene	Shale, siltstone
Lebu Group	Trihueco Formation	Marine and continental	Eocene	Sandstone, shale, coal
Lebu Group	Boca Lebu Formation	Marine	Eocene	Clay-rich and calcareous siltstone, sandstone
Lebu Group	Curanilahue Formation	Marine and continental	Paleocene	Massive sandstone, coal, clay-rich sandstone
Quiriquina Formation		Marine	Late Maastrichtian	Sandstone, conglomerate

Pliocene Tubul Formation is the oldest formation in the basin that has not been folded. It lies on an unconformity that cuts across all other formations of the basin. At present it reaches 100 metres (330 ft) above sea level in some locations and is dissected by a number of small valleys. The base of the Ranquil Formation is the so-called "main unconformity" which is thought to have formed by erosion during a period of tectonic inversion.

== Tectonic evolution ==
A three-stage model of evolution has been proposed for the Arauco Basin. First a phase of extension in the Late Cretaceous and Paleogene. Then a basin inversion lasting from the Middle Eocene to the Miocene causing the uplift and erosion that created the "main unconformity" and finally a post-inversion phase of strike-slip faulting in the Pliocene and Pleistocene. The subduction of the Mocha fracture zone under the basin that begun about 3.6 million years ago is believed to have caused the uplift of the basin plus some further tectonic inversion and contraction.

== See also ==
- Caldera Basin
- Cura-Mallín Basin
- Magallanes Basin
