= Quiriquina Formation =

Geological formation in Chile

- Stratigraphic range: Late Maastrichtian
- Type: Geological formation
- Unit of: Arauco Group
- Underlies: Lebu Group
- Overlies: Granitic rocks

Lithology
- Primary: Sandstone
- Other: Conglomerate

Location
- Coordinates: 33.5°S 71.7°W
- Approximate paleocoordinates: 35.6°S 59.2°W
- Region: Bío Bío, Concepción & Valparaíso Regions
- Country: Chile
- Extent: Arauco Basin

Type section
- Named for: Quiriquina Island
- Named by: Biró-Bagóczky
- Year defined: 1982
- Quiriquina Formation (Chile)

The Quiriquina Formation is a geological formation in Chile whose strata date back to the Late Cretaceous. Dinosaur remains are among the fossils that have been recovered from the formation. The glauconitic sandstones and conglomerates of the formation were deposited in a marine environment.

== Paleofauna ==
Color key: Taxon / Reclassified taxon / Taxon falsely reported as present / Dubious taxon or junior synonym / Ichnotaxon / Ootaxon / Morphotaxon

Notes
Uncertain or tentative taxa are in small text
~~crossed out~~ taxa are discredited.

=== Reptiles ===
==== Birds ====
Birds reported from the Quiriquina Formation
Genus	Species	Presence	Material	Notes	Images
Neogaeornis	N. wetzeli	Bahía San Vicente	Two tarsometatarsi	A diving bird, possibly a vegaviid	

==== Mosasaurs ====
Mosasaurs reported from the Quiriquina Formation
Genus	Species	Presence	Material	Notes	Images
cf. Halisaurinae indet.	Indeterminate	Loanco	Isolated tooth (SGO.PV.6629)	A halisaurine, another specimen formerly given the same classification has been reclassified as Halisaurus sp.	
Halisaurus	H. sp.	Cocholgüe	Jaw elements (CPOC/Q/3105)	Specimen formerly classified as cf. Plotosaurus sp. and cf. Halisaurinae indet.	
Mosasauridae indet.	Indeterminate	Quiriquina Island	Dorsal vertebra (CPMC 18)	A mosasaur, specimen is too fragmentary and eroded for more precise identification	
Mosasauridae indet.	Indeterminate	Algarrobo	Isolated tooth (SGO.PV.6570); Three isolated tooth crowns (SGO.PV.6571)	Material resembles the teeth of a specimen now referred to Halisaurus sp. (CPOC/Q/3105)	
Plotosaurus	cf. P. sp.	Cocholgüe	Jaw elements (CPOC/Q/3105)	Specimen reassigned to Halisaurus sp.	
Tylosaurinae indet.	Indeterminate	Cocholgüe; Loanco	Two teeth (MPC 11000 & MPC 11001)	A tylosaurine	

==== Plesiosaurs ====
Plesiosaurs reported from the Quiriquina Formation
Genus	Species	Presence	Material	Notes	Images
Aristonectes	A. quiriquinensis	Cocholgüe; Las Tablas Bay	Partial skeleton (SGO.PV.957); Postcranial skeleton of a juvenile (SGO.PV.260); Complete femur (SGO.PV.135); Partial humerus (SGO.PV.169); Caudal vertebrae (SGO.PV.94)	An aristonectine, some specimens of this species were formerly reported as Aristonectinae indet. or Mauisaurus sp.	
Aristonectinae indet.	Indeterminate	Las Tablas Bay	Postcranial skeleton of a juvenile (SGO.PV.260)	Specimen reassigned to Aristonectes quiriquinensis	
Cimoliasaurus	C. andium		Vertebrae and limb elements	An elasmosaurid, species now deemed a nomen dubium	
Elasmosauridae indet.	Indeterminate	Algarrobo	21 articulated vertebrae (SGO.PV.90); 17 teeth (SGO.PV.6572)	An elasmosaurid	
Elasmosauridae indet.	Indeterminate	Mariscadero	Postcranial skeleton (SGO.PV.6506)	May represent the same species as material referred to the dubious "Cimoliasaurus" andium	
Mauisaurus	M. sp.	Las Tablas Bay	Complete femur (SGO.PV.135); Partial humerus (SGO.PV.169)	Specimens reassigned to Aristonectes quiriquinensis	
Plesiosauria indet.	Indeterminate	Algarrobo	Partial left propodial (SGO.PV.6638)	May represent a young individual	
Pliosaurus	P. chilensis		Vertebrae and limb elements (now lost)	Species now deemed a nomen dubium, material actually represents an elasmosaurid and not a pliosaur	
Wunyelfia	W. maulensis	Pelluhue	Partial skeleton (SGO.PV.6507)	An aristonectine	

==== Turtles ====
Turtles reported from the Quiriquina Formation
Genus	Species	Presence	Material	Notes	Images
Australobaena	A. chilensis	Quiriquina	Skull (SFMF R 4151)	A baenid	
Chelonioidea indet.	Indeterminate	Algarrobo	Partial left humerus (MPC.11001)	A sea turtle	
cf. Dermochelyidae indet.	Indeterminate	Algarrobo	Associated ilium, scapula and pubis (SGO.PV.6573)	A possible dermochelyid, though the feature used to diagnose it as such may also be present in some protostegids	
Euclastes	E. sp.	Cocholgüe	Skull (SGO.PV.6504)	A pancheloniid	
Testudines indet.	Indeterminate	Algarrobo	Neural plate (MPC.11003); Peripheral plate (MPC.11002)	A turtle, specimens cannot be identified more precisely	

=== Fish ===
==== Bony fish ====
Bony fish reported from the Quiriquina Formation
Genus	Species	Presence	Material	Notes	Images
Belonostomus	B. longirostris	Algarrobo	Two rostrum fragments (SGO-PV 788 & SGO PV 790); Predentary (SGO-PV-789)	An aspidorhynchid	
Enchodus	E. sp.	Algarrobo	Abdominal centrum (SGO.PV.6825); Dermopalatine with attached fang (SGO.PV.6820a); Broken dermopalatine with attached broken fang (SGO.PV.6820b); Incomplete right articular (SGO.PV.6824); Two isolated fangs (SGO.PV.6519)	An aulopiform	
Pachycormidae indet.	Indeterminate	Algarrobo	Six teeth (SGO.PV.6620)	Specimens resemble the teeth of Protosphyraena but are much smaller	
Pachyrhizodus	P. sp.	Algarrobo	Three isolated teeth (SGO.PV.6571)	A crossognathiform	

==== Cartilaginous fish ====
Cartilaginous fish reported from the Quiriquina Formation
Genus	Species	Presence	Material	Notes	Images
Biropristis	B. landbecki	Algarrobo	Oral teeth	A sawskate	
Callorhynchus	C. sp.		Dental plates	A ratfish	
Carcharias	C. sp.		Teeth	A sand shark	
Centrophoroides	C. sp.		Teeth	A dogfish shark	
Chimaera	C. sp.		Dental plates	A ratfish	
Dasyatidae gen. et. sp. nov.	New species		Teeth	An unnamed species of stingray	
Edaphodon	E. sp.		Dental plates	A ratfish	
Ischyrhiza	I. chilensis	Algarrobo	Rostral teeth	A sawskate	
Orectolobiformes gen. et. sp. nov.	New species		Teeth	An unnamed species of carpet shark	
Paraorthacodus	P. sp.		Teeth	A paraorthacodontid	
Squatina	S. sp.		Teeth	An angelshark	

=== Crustaceans ===
Crustaceans reported from the Quiriquina Formation
Genus	Species	Presence	Material	Notes	Images
Anomura indet.	Indeterminate	Algarrobo	Broken dactylus tip (SGO.PI.6408)	A possible hermit crab	
Protocallianassa	P. saetosa	Algarrobo; Loanco	Multiple specimens	A callianassid	

=== Molluscs ===
==== Bivalves ====
Bivalves reported from the Quiriquina Formation
Genus	Species	Presence	Material	Notes	Images
Cardium	C. acuticostatum	Loanco	82 specimens	A cockle	

==== Cephalopods ====
Cephalopods reported from the Quiriquina Formation
Genus	Species	Presence	Material	Notes	Images
Anagaudryceras	A. politissimum	Las Tablas; Colchogüe; Tomé	Five specimens	A gaudryceratid ammonite	
Anagaudryceras	A. subtilineatum	Colchogüe; Tomé; Lirquén	Three juvenile specimens	A gaudryceratid ammonite	
Baculites	B. anceps	Colchogüe; Las Tablas; Lirquén; San Vicente; Santa Sabina; Tomé	40 specimens	A baculitid ammonite	
Baculites	B. huenickeni	Colchogüe; Las Tablas; San Vicente; Santa Sabina	32 specimens	A baculitid ammonite	
Diplomoceras	D. cylindraceum	Colchogüe; Las Tablas; Loanco; San Vicente	Seven specimens	A diplomoceratid ammonite	
Gaudryceras	G. kayei	Colchogüe; San Vicente; Las Tablas; Lirquén; Tomé	Six specimens	A gaudryceratid ammonite	
Eubaculites	E. carinatus	Colchogüe; Las Tablas; Laguna Lo Méndez; Lirquén; Loanco	56 specimens	A baculitid ammonite	
Grossouvrites	G. gemmatus	Las Tablas; Loanco; San Vicente	Nine specimens	A kossmaticeratid ammonite	
Grossouvrites	G. joharae	Colchogüe; Las Tablas; Loanco	Six specimens	A kossmaticeratid ammonite	
Gunnarites	G. cf. bhavaniformis	San Vicente	Two fragments	A kossmaticeratid ammonite	
Hoploscaphites	H. constrictus quiriquiniensis	Colchogüe; Dichato	51 specimens	A scaphitid ammonite	
Hypophylloceras	H. (Neophylloceras) hetonaiense	Las Tablas; Colchogüe; Tomé; Lirquén	20 specimens	A phylloceratid ammonite	
Hypophylloceras	H. (Neophylloceras) inflatum	Las Tablas; Tomé	Seven specimens	A phylloceratid ammonite	
Hypophylloceras	H. (Neophylloceras) ramosum	Las Tablas; Los Viejos; Colchogüe; Tomé	17 specimens	A phylloceratid ammonite	
Hypophylloceras	H. (Neophylloceras) surya	Las Tablas; Colchogüe	Three specimens	A phylloceratid ammonite	
Kitchinites	K. darwini	Colchogüe; Las Tablas; Santa Sabina	30 specimens	A desmoceratid ammonite	
Kitchinites	K. ifrimae	Colchogüe	Four specimens	A desmoceratid ammonite	
Kitchinites	K. vicentensis	San Vicente	Four specimens	A desmoceratid ammonite	
Kossmaticeras	K. (Natalites) erbeni	Colchogüe; Las Tablas; San Vicente; Tomé	Nine specimens	A kossmaticeratid ammonite	
Maorites	M. densicostatus	Colchogüe; Las Tablas	Six specimens	A kossmaticeratid ammonite	
Menuites	M. gerardoi	San Vicente	Seven specimens	A pachydiscid ammonite	
Menuites	M. fresvillensis	Las Tablas; San Vicente	Eight specimens	A pachydiscid ammonite	
Naefia	N. neogaeia	Quiriquina Island	Shell	A groenlandibelid	
Pachydiscus	P. (Pachydiscus) gutierrezi	Colchogüe; Las Tablas; Lirquén; Puente Perales	14 specimens	A pachydiscid ammonite	
Pachydiscus	P. (Pachydiscus) jacquoti chilensis	Colchogüe; Las Tablas	Three specimens	A pachydiscid ammonite	
Phyllopachyceras	P. forbesianum	Las Tablas	One specimen	A phylloceratid ammonite	
Phylloptychoceras	P. sp.	Tomé	Five fragments	A diplomoceratid ammonite	
Pseudophyllites	P. indra	Colchogüe; Las Tablas; Loanco	Five specimen	A tetragonitid ammonite	
Trachybaculites	T. vicentei	San Vicente	One specimen	A baculitid ammonite	
Zelandites	Z. varuna	Colchogüe; Las Tablas; Los Viejos; Lirquén; Tomé	11 specimens	A gaudryceratid ammonite	

==== Gastropods ====
Gastropods reported from the Quiriquina Formation
Genus	Species	Presence	Material	Notes	Images
Anisomyon	A. patelliformis			A siphonariid	
Austrosphaera	A. difficilis			A buccinoid	
Avellana	A. (Eriptycha) chilensis			A ringiculid	
Brunonia	B. sp.			A carinariid	
Calyptraea	C. (Trochita) laevis			A calyptraeid	
Concepcionella	C. bonillana				
Crenilabium	C. (Nonacteonina) chilensis			An acteonid	
Crenilabium	C. (Eacteon) valdovinosensis	Quiriquina Island		An acteonid	
Gyrodes	G. (Dockeryella) euryomphalus			A naticid	
Petropoma	P. biroensis	Quiriquina Island		A colloniid	
Polinices	P. (Polinella) ganae			A naticid	
Pyrifusus	P. (Deussenia) gigantea	Quiriquina Island		A pholidotomid	
Pyropsis	P. (Chilenopsis) quinzioensis	Quiriquina Island		A pyropsid	
Tegula	T. ovallei		Numerous specimens, very common	A tegulid	
Tephlon	T. tummidus			A pugnellid	
Trochifusus	T. hombroniana			A pyropsid	

== See also ==
- Arauco Basin
- Dorotea Formation
- List of dinosaur-bearing rock formations
- Quiriquina Island
