= Pincheira brothers =

Chilean Royalist Bandit/Guerrilla group during the war of independence

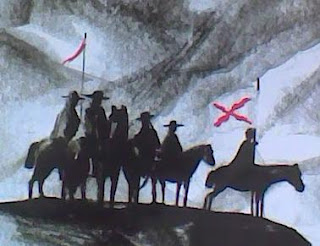
- The Pincheira brothers.
- Active: 1818–1832
- Country: Chilean Rebels
- Allegiance: Royalists
- Branch: Irregular Cavalry
- Type: Army
- Role: Raiding
- Size: 100-500
- Nickname: "The Last Defenders of the King of Spain"
- Engagements: Spanish American wars of independence

Insignia

The Pincheira brothers (Spanish: Hermanos Pincheira) was an infamous royalist outlaw group in Chile and Argentina active from 1818 to 1832.

== Background ==
In the early 19^{th} century, many European Creoles began to settle in South America and colonize the frontier. These settlers ran into the many native tribes who had lived in the region for centuries. The creoles also began to exploit the dwindling number of cattle herds and wild horses of the region. This region also served as a refuge for exiled political movements in the region. Native tribes would ally with these movements in alliances of convenience. The Pincheira brothers were one of these alliances.

The Pincheira brothers were an infamous band of bandits who fought in the Chilean War of Independence starting with the Guerra a Muerte phase. The name originates from the members of the band, four brothers and two sisters, who were part of the indigenous Chilean Pincheira family. The oldest brother Antonio joined the Spanish Army and fought at the battle of Maipu. After the defeat he returned home and the family uprooted and took up arms for the loyalist cause. The Jesuit educated family enjoyed the support of the Catholic Church.

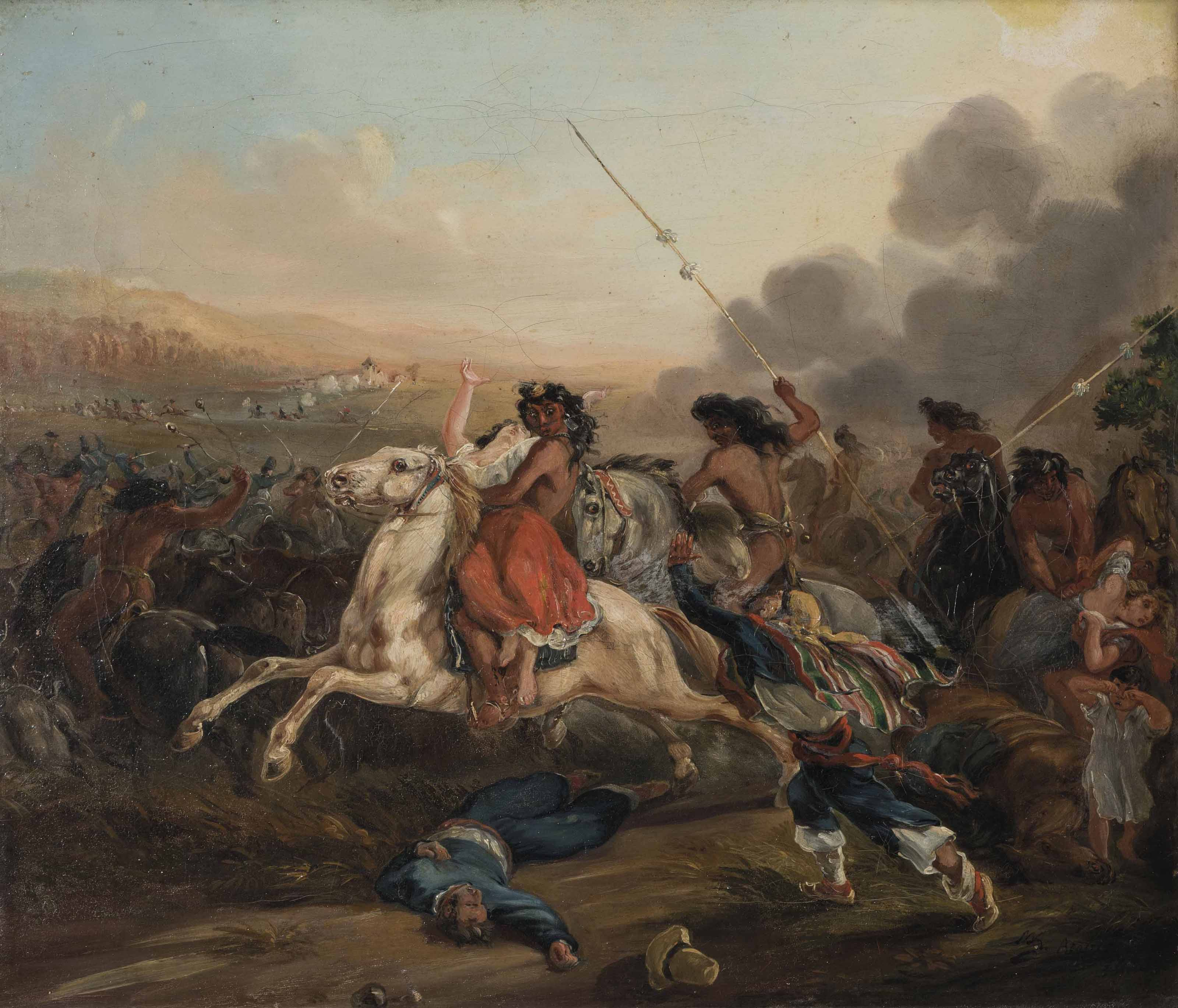
El malón (1834) by Johann Moritz Rugendas

In 1822 the loyalist general Vicente Benavides, who had been holding out in the south, was executed. Consequently the Brother’s band grew as peasants and “patriots” (political refugees from loyalist armies) joined. This put the band's numbers in the hundreds. Also, in 1822 the band allied with the Pehuenche Indians of Neuquén as well as the Epulafquen and other tribes.

At this point the Pincheira Brothers, the last loyalist army in the region, were little more than glorified raiders. They practicied the Malones doctrine: a form of Mapuche raiding where a large force would ambush a settlement with the aim of stealing cattle and women. The band would utilize mountain passes in the Andes to hide from the new government and raid settlements from 1822 – 1832.

In 1823 Antonio Pincheira was killed in a fight with the Chilean Army. His younger brother Santos took command. Santos would cement the group as folk heroes through his distribution of goods from the government and wealthy landowners to the peasants. Santos would drown a year later, and Paul and Jose Pincheira would lead the group fighting off a massive army of 1,000 Chilean soldiers attacking Neuquen, the base of their indigenous allies. Subsequently the Chilean Government declared a “war of death” in which the government would engage in a brutal war of attrition against the band and their native allies culminating with the bands defeat in 1832.

The band would seek refuge in Mendoza where they aided the Federalist faction against the Unitarians in the Argentine Civil War. Jose Antonio Pincheira was named commander of the "southern frontier" in Mendoza by the federalist governor. However, once the unitarians kicked the federalists out of Mendoza the federalist governor and a cadre of officers asked Jose for assistance against the unitarians. They were massacred instead by Pincheira's indigenous allies.

After the Federalists retook Mendoza several unitarian officials were tried in absentia for incitement of the massacre although it is unclear what actually happened. Subsequently Juan Manuel de Rosas federalist government in Buenos Aires cooperated with the Chilean government to destroy the Pincheira Brothers in a pincer campaign. The Chilean army ultimately slaughtered most of the band in the Battle of the gaps Epulafquen, January 14, 1832. The Chilean Army supposedly captured 20,000 head of cattle, though this may have been an exaggeration. Jose Antonio Pincheira escaped after an unsuccessful pursuit by Chilean soldiers, he was eventually pardoned. The "Last Defender of the King of Spain" died of old age in 1884.

A significant folklore has grown around the cave Cueva de los Pincheira, a hideout of the gang. Supposedly a white mule appears at night and leads those who follow to lost Pincheira treasure. The cries of women kept captive have also been heard.

== Motivations ==
Historians think the Pincheira Brother's stated motivations, loyalty to the Ferdinand VII and the Spanish Crown, were doubtful. The Brothers were attempting to sell themselves as more than just bandits in an effort to attract recruits from the scattered bands of loyalists. In 1822 the loyalist commander Benavides was defeated and executed. The Pencheira Brothers attempted to fill the power vacuum. Claiming to support the king gained them infamy and legitimacy. However, the oldest brother, Antonio, served in the Spanish Army and may have had been genuinely loyal. His brothers who led the group from Antonio's death in 1823 demonstrated no support for the Spanish Crown.

== Significance ==
The Chilean government's fight against the Pencheira rebels and their Pehuenche allies greatly impeded expansion into the Mapuche frontier. The defeat of the rebels in 1832 opened the frontier formal rule and led to the weakening of the Mapuche.

Cooperation between the fledgling governments in Santiago and Buenos Aires helped put an end to the rebels. This cooperation between the two governments would continue and help tame the southern frontier by putting down local leaders and tribes. This effort would force the two governments to invest in their control over the southern frontiers and lead to the eventual formalization of the rough borders of the region.
