= Pedro Andrés del Alcázar =

Chilean Army officer (1752–1820)

Marshal Pedro Andrés del Alcázar y Rodríguez de Zapata (12 December 1752 – 28 September 1820) was a Spanish and later Chilean Army officer and hero of the Chilean War of Independence.

== Early life ==
Alcázar was born in the fort of San Diego de Alcalá, in Tucapel, the son of Andrés del Alcázar, an infantry captain and the fort's commander, and of Feliciana Rodríguez de Zapata y Sanhueza. began his military career in 1773 as a "distinguished" soldier in the Dragones de la Frontera cavalry regiment of the Spanish Army. When shortly after his official commission as a Cadet arrived from Spain, it was discovered that by a copyist mistake, it was made out to a Pedro del Alcázar instead of his real name Andrés del Alcázar. In order to solve the discrepancy, the commander of the regiment, Colonel Ambrosio O'Higgins ordered his act of baptism modified to read Pedro Andrés, the name he would be known ever after.

In 1776, del Alcázar was promoted to Alférez, to Lieutenant of the Dragones de la Frontera in 1783 and to Captain in 1785. He married Clara de Zumelzu Obregón y Ruiz de Berecedo In 1777, and together they had 7 children: Carmen, Juan Andrés, Mateo (who became a priest), Antonia, Juana, Teresa and José Antonio.

== War of Independence ==
He supported the patriot side on the Chilean War of Independence from the beginning, and in 1811 he was dispatched by the First Government Junta to support the government of Buenos Aires, then under threat from a Royalist invasion. He took with him a small contingent, named the "disciplined troops" (Spanish: Tropas Disciplinadas), composed of 200 infantry soldiers and 100 Dragones de la Frontera cavalry. Among the 27 officers he took along were the captains José Joaquín Prieto, future President and Manuel José Bulnes, father of the president of the same name. They arrived to Buenos Aires on June 16, where they supported José de San Martín and the creation of the Second Triumvirate during the revolution of October 8.

=== Patria Vieja campaign ===
In April 1813, Alcázar requested permission from the governing body of the United Provinces of the Río de la Plata to return to Chile together with his troop, in order to help in the defense of the country. The troops left Buenos Aires on April 18, crossed the Andes at the end of May and arrived to Santiago on June 4, where was received with wild enthusiasm. The Chilean government first sent the "disciplined troops" to defend Valparaíso, but soon after they were sent south to defend Talca, where they were incorporated into the Auxiliary Division. As part of this division, under the command of Colonel Marcos González de Balcarce, they captured Longaví, Cauquenes and Quirihue.

After the capture of the frigate Thomas, Alcázar was charged with the protection of José Ignacio Cienfuegos, the commissioner transporting the captured money and documents taken to the Royalist army. Later, on the Battle of Cucha-Cucha (February 23), Del Alcázar was second in command to Brigadier Juan Mackenna.

== Additional information ==
=== See also ===
- Battle of Tarpellanca

=== Sources ===
- Barros Arana, Diego (1850). Estudios históricos sobre Vicente Benavides i las campañas del Sur: 1818-1822 (in Spanish). Santiago, Chile: Impr. de Julio Belin i Compañia.
- Castedo, Leopoldo (1954). Resumen de la Historia de Chile de Francisco Antonio Encina (in Spanish). Vol. 2. Santiago, Chile: Empresa Editora Zig-Zag.
- Contreras Gomez, Domingo (1942). La Ciudad de Santa María de Los Angeles (in Spanish). Vol. 1. Santiago, Chile: Empresa Editora Zig-Zag.
- Fernández, Carlos (1933). Recuerdos Históricos. Tarpellanca. (26. IX. 1820). Memorial del Ejército de Chile (in Spanish). Santiago, Chile: Imprenta Fiscal.
- Vicuña Mackenna, Benjamín (1868). La guerra a muerte: memoria sobre las últimas campañas de la Independencia de Chile (1819-1824) (in Spanish). Santiago, Chile: Imprenta Nacional. pp. 562.
- Archivo O'Higgins (in Spanish). Vol. II, XVI & XXI. Santiago, Chile: varias imprentas. 1946–1966.
- "Andres del Alcazar". Ejercito de Chile (in Spanish). Archived from the original on June 5, 2008.
