= Lebu Group =

Chilean geologic formation

- Stratigraphic range: Paleocene–Eocene
- Type: Stratigraphic group
- Sub-units: Millongue Formation; Trihueco Formation; Boca Lebu Formation; Curanilahue Formation
- Underlies: Ranquil Formation
- Overlies: Quiriquina Formation

Lithology
- Primary: Shale, sandstone, siltstone, mudstone
- Other: Coal

Location
- Coordinates: 37.6°S 73.7°W
- Approximate paleocoordinates: 40.1°S 64.2°W
- Region: Bío Bío Region
- Country: Chile
- Extent: Arauco Basin

Type section
- Named for: Lebu
- Lebu Group (Chile)

Lebu Group is stratigraphic unit of Arauco Basin in south-central Chile. The group consists of a sequence of four formations, of both marine and nonmarine origin, deposited between the Early Paleocene and Middle Eocene.

== Description ==
The group is made up of four formations, from youngest to oldest these are: Millongue Formation, (Note: What was previously known as Caleta Viel Formation is now considered to be the roof Millongue Formation.) Trihueco Formation, Boca Lebu Formation and Curanilahue Formation.

The Eocene Millongue Formation is composed of shale and siltstone of both marine and continental origin. Its top is marked by an unconformity, the so-called “main unconformity” of Arauco Basin, which is thought to have formed by erosion during a period of tectonic inversion.
