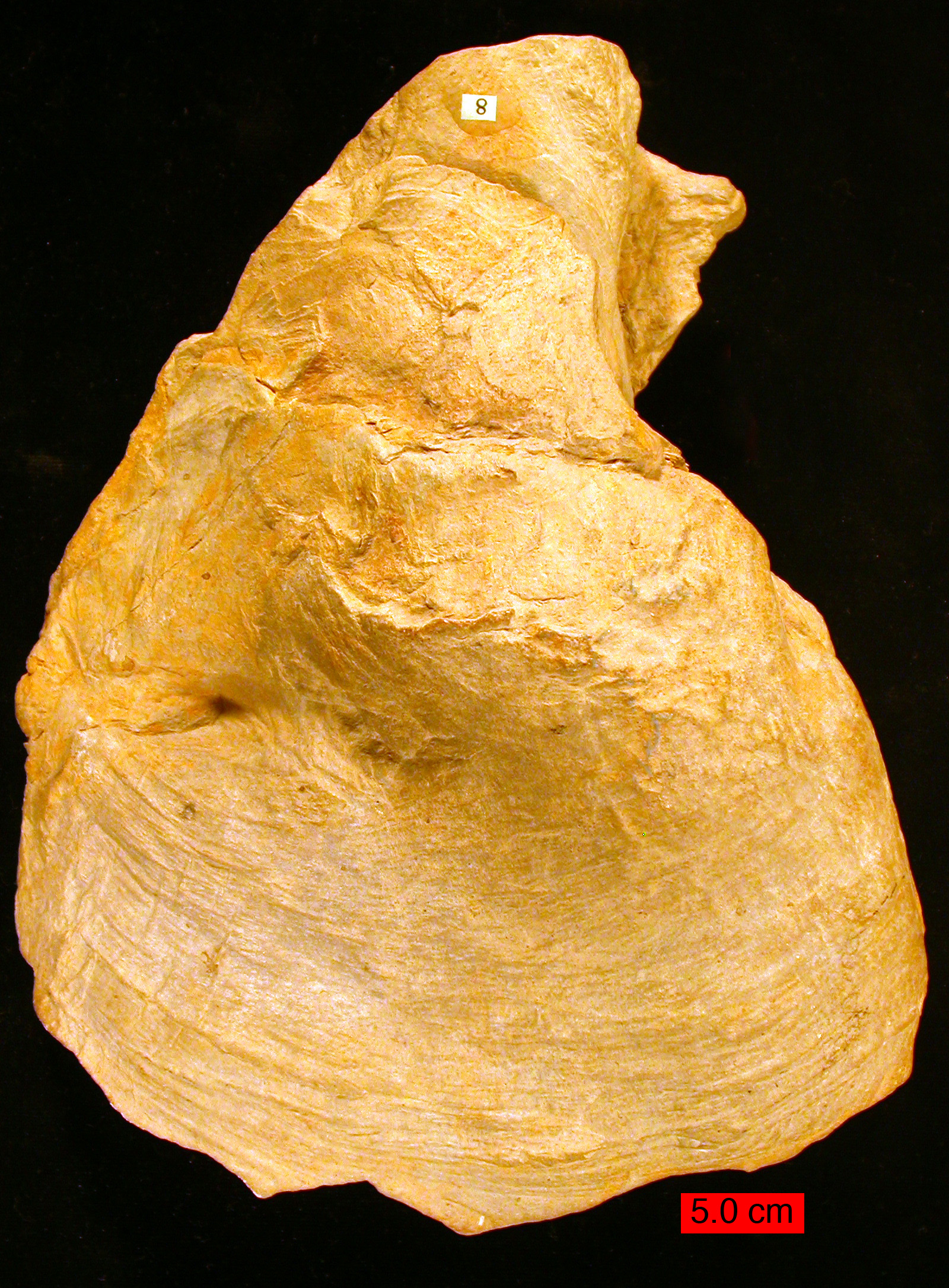
- Zoophycos trace fossil from the Mississippian of northern Kentucky. Scale bar is 5.0 cm (2 inches).

Trace fossil classification
- Ichnogenus: Zoophycos; Massalongo, 1855

= Zoophycos =

Trace fossil

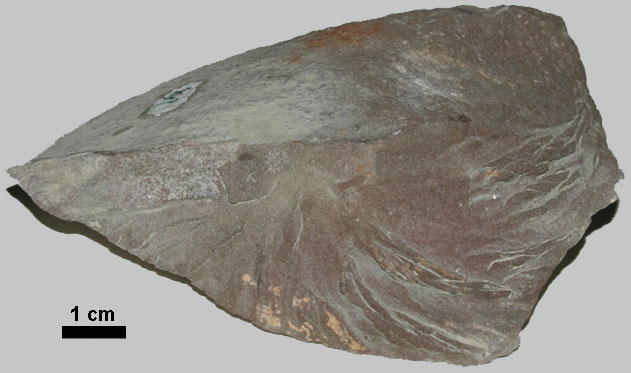
Zoophycos from turbidites of Farmers Member of Borden Formation at mile marker 135, I-64, Kentucky.

Zoophycos is a somewhat cosmopolitan ichnogenus thought to be produced by moving and feeding polychaete worms.

== Appearance ==
Zoophycos occurs in two forms, one planar, and one which resembles a corkscrew. In the latter helicoidal form, successive turns have larger or smaller radii. A marginal tube surrounds the perimeter of the corkscrew, linked to the vertical shaft that connects the burrow to the surface. Spreiten occur between the marginal tube and the corkscrew axis. The burrows can exceed a metre in vertical and horizontal dimension.

== Ethology ==
One hypothesis proposes that Zoophycos represents gardening behaviour, in a similar fashion to Palaeodictyon. According to this view, there should be a fractionation of carbon isotopes between the burrow infills and the matrix – but such differentiation was not observed in Quaternary instances from deep-water cores off the Portuguese coast.(Variation in morphology between different zoophycos 'species' means that these may not be representative of all zoophycos instances.) Instead, increased concentration of organic carbon within burrows suggests that the burrows may have been used to cache food resources. Alternatively, the burrows may simply be deposit feeding traces.

== Occurrence ==
Zoophycos gives its name to the Zoophycos ichnofacies, an assemblage of trace fossils which is associated with the shelf break. Nevertheless, it is now appreciated that it has a somewhat more cosmopolitan occurrence that has changed through time. It is typically associated with deep marine muds and sands, often between turbidite beds. It is known from both the fossil record and deep sea sediment cores. However, it can also occur in shallow-marine storm deposits, and indeed in Moroccan deposits it seems only to occur in beds that have some form of storm-supplied sediment input.

It occurs from the early Ordovician until the present. It is restricted to deep waters in the Silurian, but occurs in nearshore settings from the Devonian until the end of the Permian.

== See also ==
- Bioturbation
