= Perseverance (1797 ship) =

History

United States
- Launched: 1797
- Fate: Sold c.1799

Great Britain
- Name: Perseverance
- Acquired: 1799 by purchase
- Captured: March 1821 by pirates
- Fate: Burnt

General characteristics
- Tons burthen: 299, or 300, or 332 (bm)
- Complement: 35
- Armament: 1808:20 × 6&9-pounder cannons; 1809:2 × 9-pounder guns + 16 × 6-pounder carronades
- Notes: Pine sides

Perseverance was launched in Virginia in 1797, and was registered in Great Britain in 1799. A privateer captured her in 1800, but the British Royal Navy recaptured her within days. She traded with Baltimore, Brazil, and the Mediterranean. She made one voyage as a whaler that resulted in pirates taking her in 1821, killing her master and at least some of her crew, and burning her.

== Career ==
Perseverance entered Lloyd's Register (LR), in 1799.

Year	Master	Owner	Trade	Source & notes
1799	T. Norman	Jacquiere	London–Lisbon	Lloyd's Register (LR)
1800	T. Norman	Brown & Co.	London–Baltimore	LR
1800	T. Norman	A. Ghapwrie	London–Baltimore	Register of Shipping (RS)

Lloyd's List reported on 11 March 1800, that Perseverance, Norman, master, had been sailing from Baltimore to London when the privateer Mars captured her. However, HMS Nereide recaptured Perseverance and sent her into Plymouth. Nereide had recaptured the American ship Perseverance, of Baltimore, on 3 March. She was carrying a cargo valued at £30,000. (Note: HMS Amethyst and Nymphe captured Mars. At the time there was already an HMS Mars, so the Royal Navy took the privateer into service as Garland.)

Year	Master	Owner	Trade	Source & notes
1801	T. Norman; W. Bryden	Brown & Co.	London–Lisbon; London–Baltimore	LR
1805	W. Dryden	Brown & Co.	London–Baltimore	LR & RS

Captain David Isbetser (or Ibitser) acquired a letter of marque on 26 January 1808. The Register of Shipping for 1809 shows Perseverance's master as D. Isbetser, her owner as Buckle & Co., and her trade as London–Hayti. She had damages repaired in 1806.

Year	Master	Owner	Trade	Source & notes
1810	Isbester	Jacobs	London–Brazils	LR & RS; damages & good repair 1805 (or 1806)
1815	T. Winter	Boyd & Co.	London–Rio de Janeiro	LR — Good repair and two damage repairs in 1814; RS — Large repair 1812 & damage and good repair 1813
1820	T. Winter; Clark	Boyd & Co.	London–Constantinople; London–South Seas	LR
1820	T. Winter	Boyd & Co.	London–Malta	RS
1821	Clerk	M. Boyd	London–Southern Fishery	RS

== Fate ==
Captain Clark sailed Perseverance from England on 1 February 1820, bound for whaling off the coast of Peru. By May 20, she was around Cape Horn, and she was at Lima in October−November. Initially she was reported to have been seen hauled on shore at St Mary's (Santa María Island, Chile – 37°03′S 73°31′W), and stripped, and her casks and other articles strewn along the shore. She had been anchored at Santa Maria in March 1821, when a boat belonging to the pirate Vicente Benavides captured her; she was later burnt in the Tubul River (37.233°S 73.443°W). Benavides had murdered Clark, two mates, and part of her crew.
