= Egidio Feruglio =

Italian geologist (1897–1954)

- Born: September 10, 1897; Tavagnacco, Italy
- Died: July 14, 1954 (aged 56); Udine, Italy
- Scientific career
- Fields: explorer, geologist, naturalist, paleontologist

Egidio Feruglio (10 September 1897 – 14 July 1954) was an Italian-born geologist who spent most of his career in Argentina.

== Early life ==
The seventh of twelve sons, Feruglio finished grammar school in 1914, and then enrolled at the University of Florence. In Florence, he studied medicine and natural sciences, graduating in 1920. He became assistant university professor of geology at the University of Cagliari. During this period, he was dedicated in particular to geographic studies, as well as geology and glaciology of the Alps.

== Moving to Argentina and subsequent career ==
In 1925, he became assistant geologist at an oil company in Argentina, where he worked and travelled extensively in search of oil deposits, until 1928. After travelling for a year in Italy, Feruglio returned to Argentina to continue geologic studies in Patagonia and the province of Salta. From 1932 to 1934 he was back in Italy, working at the geologic institute of the University of Bologna, as director of the paleontology section. Forced to leave because of his refusal to join the Fascist Party, Feruglio returned to Argentina in 1934, where he resumed geologic research in Patagonia, subsequently travelling and carrying out geologic studies in that region. He became attached to the National University of Cuyo in Mendoza, with the mission of reorganizing its institute for oil studies, and creating a course of mineralogy and geology. He became chair of the department of geology and petrology.

Besides the activities and studies in his university positions, Feruglio carried out explorations in Uruguay, Chile and Brazil. He authored hundreds of publications on geology, paleontology and morphology, published in both Italy and Argentina, many illustrated with geologic maps.

The main contributions for which Feruglio is remembered are his scientific studies on geology and morphology in Italy and in Patagonia. He was a member of various scientific organizations. He died in Friuli, Italy on 14 July 1954.

== Memorials ==
One of the Villanova Caves, in the province of Udine, Italy bears his name, as does the Museum of Paleontology Egidio Feruglio located in Trelew, Argentina. A prehistoric category of mammals has also been named for him.

== Bibliography ==
- Magrini, Bianca. Lettere per l'Argentina a Egidio Feruglio, Ribis Publisher, Udine (2006).
