= Vicente Benavides =

Chilean soldier

- Charles Ellms (1837) "The head of Benavides stuck on a pole"
- Born: c. 1777; Quirihue, Captaincy General of Chile, Spanish Empire
- Died: 23 February 1822 (aged 44–45); Santiago, Chile
- Cause of death: Hanging

Vicente Benavides Llanos (c. 1777 – 23 February 1822) was a Chilean soldier, guerrilla and Royalist. Benavides is known for leading guerrillas in La Frontera during the last years of the Chilean War of Independence.

== Life as soldier ==
He initially supported the patriots but later defected to fight for the royalists. He then led the royalist bands during the so-called Guerra a muerte. This was a time of irregular warfare. Benavides obtained the aid of many Mapuche chiefs to combat the Chileans and pillage the countryside. He became known in this period for cruelty towards prisoners and breaking faith during truces. The Pincheira brothers, a future outlaw group, served Benavides in the Guerra a muerte by defending the Cordillera.

In March 1821, Perseverance was anchored at St Mary's (37°03′S 73°31′W) when a boat belonging to Benavides captured her; she was later burnt in the Tubul River (37.233°S 73.443°W). Benavides murdered her master, two mates, and part of her crew.

On 14 May, Benevides seized the American merchant vessel Hersilia, also at Santa Maria island, and later destroyed it.

== Execution ==
Benavides was captured near the end of the war. After a brief trial in Santiago, Benavides was hanged on 23 February 1822. His body was mutilated and dismembered as a result of public outrage against him.

== Aftermath ==
Benavides was the last royalist commander in southern Chile. The power vacuum after his execution was exploited by Antonio Pincheira. His band called the Pincheira Brothers fought with Benavides from 1818-1822. Antonio Pincheira organized many of his former soldiers into his gang and used them to become an infamous outlaw for the next decade.

== In literature ==
The author Joseph Conrad modeled his character Gaspar Ruiz on Benavides. Conrad wrote "Gaspar Ruiz": in 1904–5, published it in The Strand Magazine (1906), and again in A Set of Six (1908 in the UK; 1915 in the US). This story was the only piece of Conrad's fiction ever adapted by the author for cinema, as Gaspar the Strong Man (1920). Conrad found Benavides in Chapter 4 of Captain Basil Hall's 1824 book.
