= Tubul River =

River in Chile

The Tubul River is a river of the Bío Bío Region of Chile. Where the river reaches the Pacific Ocean stands the small fishing village of Tubul.

The coastline near the egress of the river is cliff-lined and hilly. Prior to 1835, the lower mile of the river was navigable. An earthquake in that year temporarily blocked off the river by raising the sand bar. In 2010 the nearby city of Concepción was struck by a magnitude 8.8 earthquake. Multiple waves generated by the earthquake, arriving from both the ocean and the river, struck and nearly destroyed the village of Tubul.

== See also ==
- Tubul Formation
