= Pfannenstiel =

Pfannenstiel may refer to:

== People ==
- Hermann Johannes Pfannenstiel (1862–1909), German gynecologist who was a native of Berlin (see Pfannenstiel incision)
- Jackalyne Pfannenstiel (born 1947), United States Assistant Secretary of the Navy (Installations and Environment)
- Lutz Pfannenstiel (born 1973), retired German footballer
- Max Pfannenstiel (1902–1976), German geologist
- Peter Pfannenstiel (1934–2013), German professor of medicine and thyroid expert; son of Wilhelm Pfannenstiel
- Wilhelm Pfannenstiel (1890–1982), German professor of hygiene and SS Standartenführer; son of Hermann Johannes Pfannenstiel

== Other ==
- Pfannenstiel incision, a type of surgical incision that allows access to the abdomen
- Pfannenstiel (Zürich), a mountain in the canton of Zurich, Switzerland
- Pfannenstiel (ship, 1998), a ship operated on Lake Zurich in Switzerland
