= Bentz =

Bentz is a surname. Notable people with the surname include:

- Alfred Bentz (1897–1964), German geologist
- Chad Bentz (born 1980), American baseball player
- Cliff Bentz (born 1952), American politician
- Eddie Bentz (1894–1979), American criminal
- Gunnar Bentz (born 1996), American swimmer
- Melitta Bentz (1873–1950), German businesswoman and inventor
- Misty C. Bentz (born 1980), American astrophysicist
- Roman Bentz (1919–1996), American football player
- Avery Bentz (born 1997), Canadian financial prodigy
- David Bentz (born 1986), American politician
- Mark Bentz (born 1965), Canadian politician

== See also ==
- Bendz, a surname
- Benz (disambiguation)
