= Hans Stille Medal =

German geology award

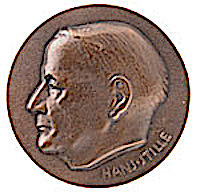
Hans Stille Medal 1948

The Hans Stille Medal was a scientific award of the Deutsche Gesellschaft für Geowissenschaften (German Society for Geosciences), given to an individual who made outstanding contributions in the fields of geology and earth sciences. The award was named after German tectonicist Hans Stille and suspended in 2016.

== Laureates ==
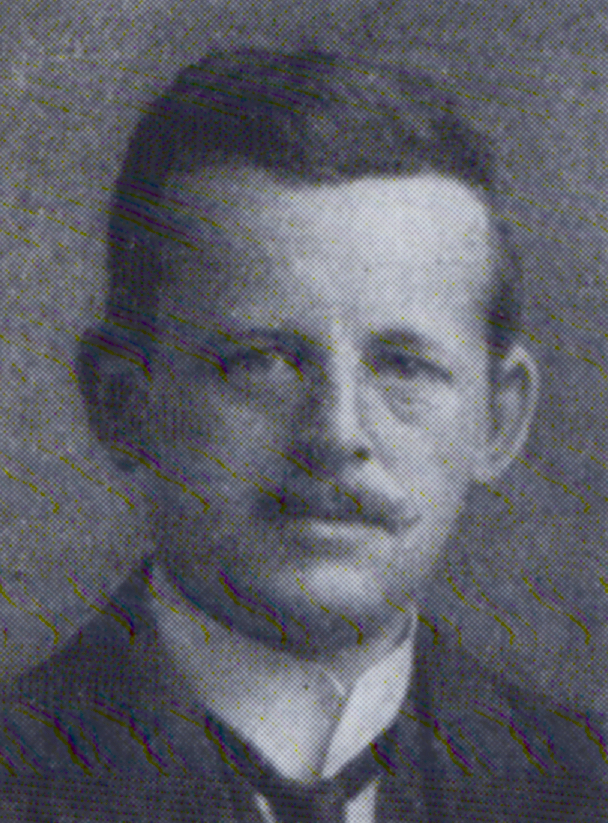
Otto Erdmannsdörffer, Recipient 1953

- 1948 Karl Erich Andrée, Erich Bederke, Roland Brinkmann, Hermann Reich, Karl-Hermann Scheumann, Johannes Wanner, Paul Woldstedt
- 1949 no award
- 1950 Adolf Wurm
- 1951 Rudolf Richter
- 1952 Alfred Bentz
- 1953 Otto Erdmannsdörffer
- 1954 Hermann Schmidt
- 1955 Franz Lotze
- 1956 no award
- 1957 Wilhelm Otto Dietrich
- 1958 Wilhelm Kegel
- 1959 Ernst Kraus
- 1960 Ehrhard Voigt
- 1961 Rolf B. Behrmann
- 1962 Hans-Joachim Martini
- 1963 Carl Wilhelm Correns
- 1964 Karl Krejci-Graf
- 1965 Hans-Rudolf von Gaertner
- 1966 Georg Knetsch
- 1967 Karl Richard Mehnert, Max Richter
- 1968 Gerhard Richter-Bernburg
- 1969 Marlies Teichmüller, Rolf Teichmüller
- 1970 no award
- 1971 Andreas Pilger
- 1972 Herbert Karrenberg
- 1973 Hans Closs, Wolf von Engelhardt
- 1974 Max Pfannenstiel
- 1975 Henno Martin
- 1976 Wolfgang Schott
- 1977 Helmut G. F. Winkler
- 1978 Julius Hesemann
- 1979 Paul Schmidt-Thomé
- 1980 no award
- 1981 Henning Illies
- 1982 Martin Schwarzbach
- 1983 Walter Carlé
- 1984 Hans Füchtbauer
- 1985 Erik Flügel
- 1986 Eugen Seibold
- 1987 Walter Kertz
- 1988 Paul Wurster
- 1989 Eberhard Plein
- 1990 Georg Matthess
- 1991 Gerhard Einsele
- 1992 Hermann Jaeger
- 1993 Eva Paproth
- 1994 Franz Kockel
- 1995 German Müller
- 1996 Roland Walter
- 1997 Max Schwab
- 1998 Egon Althaus
- 1999 Reinhard Pflug
- 2000 Lothar Eissmann
- 2001 Hans-Ulrich Schmincke
- 2002 Hubert Miller
- 2003 Jörn Thiede
- 2004 Karl-Heinrich Heitfeld
- 2005 Dieter K. Fütterer
- 2006 Dierk Henningsen
- 2007 Gerhard Katzung
- 2008 Wolfgang Frisch
- 2009 Horst D. Schulz
- 2010 Georg Kleinschmidt
- 2011 Werner Buggisch
- 2012 Thilo Bechstädt
- 2013 Gerhard H. Bachmann
- 2014 Gerhard Wörner

== See also ==
- List of geology awards
