= Benz =

Benz, an old Germanic clan name dating to the fifth century (related to "bear", "war banner", "gau", or a "land by a waterway") also used in German (German pronunciation: [bɛnts]) as an alternative for names such as Berthold, Bernhard, or Benedict, may refer to:

== People ==
=== Surname ===
- Amy Benz (born 1962), American golfer
- Bertha Benz (1849–1944), German marketing entrepreneur who was the first to drive an automobile for a long distance, wife of Carl Benz
- Carl Benz (1844–1929), German engineer, inventor, and entrepreneur who built the first patented automobile
- Derek Benz (born 1971), American author of fantasy fiction for children
- Edward J. Benz, Jr., professor of genetics
- Gerold Benz (1921–1987), German politician
- Gary R. Benz, producer of the GRB Studios
- Joe Benz (1886–1957), American Major League Baseball pitcher
- Joseph Benz (1944–2021), Swiss former bobsledder, Olympic and world champion
- Julie Benz (born 1972), American actress
- Kafi Benz (born 1941), American author, artist, and environmental and historic preservationist
- Larry Benz (born 1941), American former National Football League player
- Laura Benz (born 1992), Swiss ice hockey player
- Maria Benz (1906–1946), birth name of Nusch Éluard, German-born model who married Paul Éluard
- Mathilde Benz (1901–1977), birth name of Lee Parry, German actress
- Paul Benz (born 1986), Australian Paralympic athlete
- Richard Benz (1884–1966), German historian and writer
- Roland Benz (born 1943), German biophysicist
- Sara Benz (born 1992), Swiss ice hockey player
- Walter Benz (1931–2017), German mathematician known for his work on geometric planes
- Wolfgang Benz (born 1941), German historian

=== Ring or stage name ===
- Nikki Benz (born 1981), stage name of Alla Montchak, Canadian pornographic actress and director
- Spragga Benz (born 1969), stage name of Carlton Grant, Jamaican deejay and musician

== Places ==
- Benz (Usedom), Mecklenburg-Vorpommern, Germany, a municipality
- Benz, Nordwestmecklenburg, Mecklenburg-Vorpommern, Germany, a municipality
- Benice, West Pomeranian Voivodeship (Benz in German), Poland, a village
- Benz Pass, Trinity Peninsula, Antarctica

== Mathematics and science ==
- Benz (unit), a proposed unit of velocity
- Benz, an abbreviated form of Benzo, a functional group in chemistry
- Benz plane, in geometry

== Other uses ==
- Benz & Cie., a manufacturer of steam engines co-founded by Carl Benz in 1883
- Benz (group), a British band
- "Benz", a song by Denzel Curry from the album Nostalgic 64
- Benz series, a series of paintings and drawings created by Lyonel Feininger
- Benz (film), an upcoming Indian film
- Mercedes-Benz

== See also ==
- Benzz, the "Calabria" sampling West London drill rapper known for "Je M'appelle"
- Bendz, a surname
- Bentz, a surname
