= Juan Brüggen =

German-Chilean geologist

- Born: 25 April 1887; Lübeck, Germany
- Died: 7 March 1953 (age 65); Santiago, Chile
- Citizenship: Germany, West Germany
- Known for: Chilean geology
- Scientific career
- Fields: Geology
- Workplaces: University of Chile

Johannes Brüggen Messtorff better known by his hispanized name Juan Brüggen (Lübeck, Germany, April 25, 1887 – March 7, 1953, Santiago de Chile) was a German-Chilean geologist. One of his most famous works is the extensive treaty of Fundamentos de la geología de Chile published in 1950. Brüggen Glacier in the Southern Patagonian Ice Field is named after him.

In 1913 he published a report on the iron ores of the Chilean Iron Belt near La Serena and Huasco and the general geology of the region. In his study Brüggen identified El Algarrobo and El Tofo as the main iron ore deposits of Chile.

Two of Brüggen's students established the geology degree at the University of Chile; Jorge Muñoz Cristi and Héctor Flores Williams.

== See also ==
- Pablo Groeber
- Henning Illies
- Gustav Steinmann
