= Otto Erdmannsdörffer =

German mineralogist and petrographer (1876–1955)

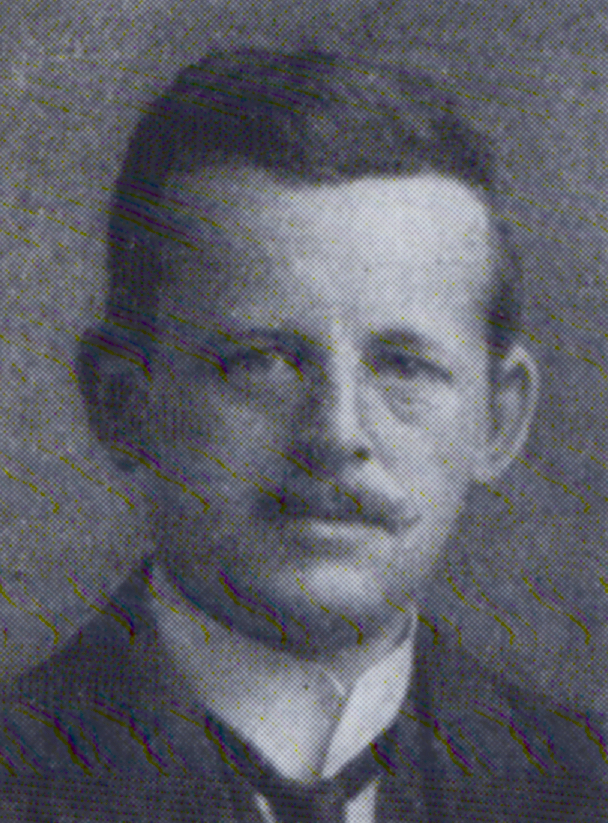
Image of Otto Erdmannsdörffer

Otto Heinrich Erdmannsdörffer (11 March 1876, Heidelberg – 19 April 1955, Heidelberg) was a German mineralogist and petrographer, known for his analysis of rocks and minerals found in the Odenwald, the Black Forest and the Harz Mountains. He was the son of historian Bernhard Erdmannsdörffer.

He studied natural sciences at the universities of Heidelberg and Strasbourg, receiving his doctorate in 1900. For the next twelve years he worked as a research assistant at the Prussian Geological Survey, and in the meantime, obtained his habilitation in mineralogy and petrology from the University of Berlin (1908). In 1912 he was appointed chair of mineralogy and petrology at the Technical University of Hannover, and in 1926 returned to Heidelberg, where he succeeded Ernst Anton Wülfing as director of the mineralogical-petrographic institute. In 1932 he was named academic rector at Heidelberg.

In 1953 he was awarded the Hans-Stille-Medaille by the Deutsche Geologische Gesellschaft. He was an editor of the journal Heidelberger Beiträge zur Mineralogie und Petrographie.

== Selected works ==
- Grundlagen der Petrographiem 1924 – Fundamentals of petrography.
- Südostmazedonien und Kleinasien, 1925 – Southeastern Macedonia and Asia Minor.
- Über Disthen-Andalusitparagenesen, 1928 – On kyanite-andalusite paragenesis.
- Über Alkalihornblenden aus dem Radautal, 1929 – On alkali hornblende from the Radau valley.
- Die Syenite des Radautales im Harz als palingene Eruptiva, 1930 – The syenite of the Radau valley in the Harz as palingenetic-eruptive.
- Über den Buchonit von Poppenhausen in der Rhön, 1933 – On the buchonite of Poppenhausen in the Rhön Mountains.
- Beiträge zur Petrographie des Odenwaldes, 1941 – Contribution to the petrography of the Odenwald.
- Über Flasergranite und Böllsteiner Gneis, 1949 – On flaser granite and Böllstein gneiss.
