= Pablo Groeber =

German geologist (1885–1964)

Pablo Groeber, Paul Gröber
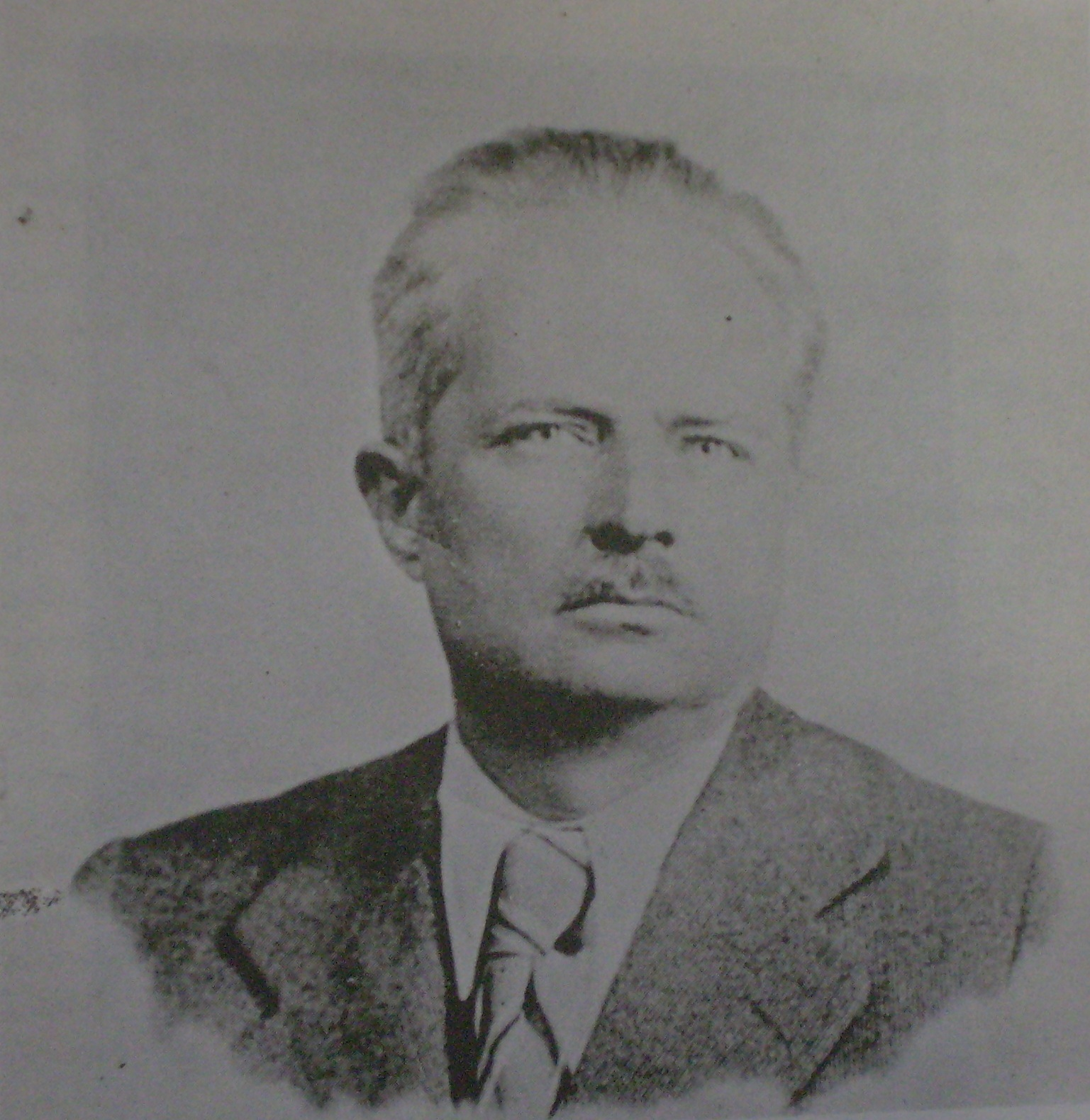
- Born: 13 July 1885; Strasbourg, Alsace-Lorraine, German Empire
- Died: 16 May 1964 (aged 78)
- Education: University of Strasbourg, Ludwig-Maximilians-Universität München
- Known for: Contributions to the geology of Patagonia
- Scientific career
- Fields: Tectonostratigraphy, Tectonics, Paleogeography, Structural geology
- Workplaces: Servicio Geológico Minero

Pablo Groeber (born Paul Friedrich Karl Gröber; 1885–1964) was a German geologist known for his contributions to the understanding of the geology of Tien Shan in Central Asia and the Andes of Nequén and Mendoza Province in Argentina.

== See also ==
- Juan Brüggen – German-Chilean geologist
- Henning Illies – German geologist
- Walther Penck – German geologist (1888–1923)
- Gustav Steinmann – German geologist and paleontologist
