= Bernhard Erdmannsdörffer =

German historian (1833–1901)

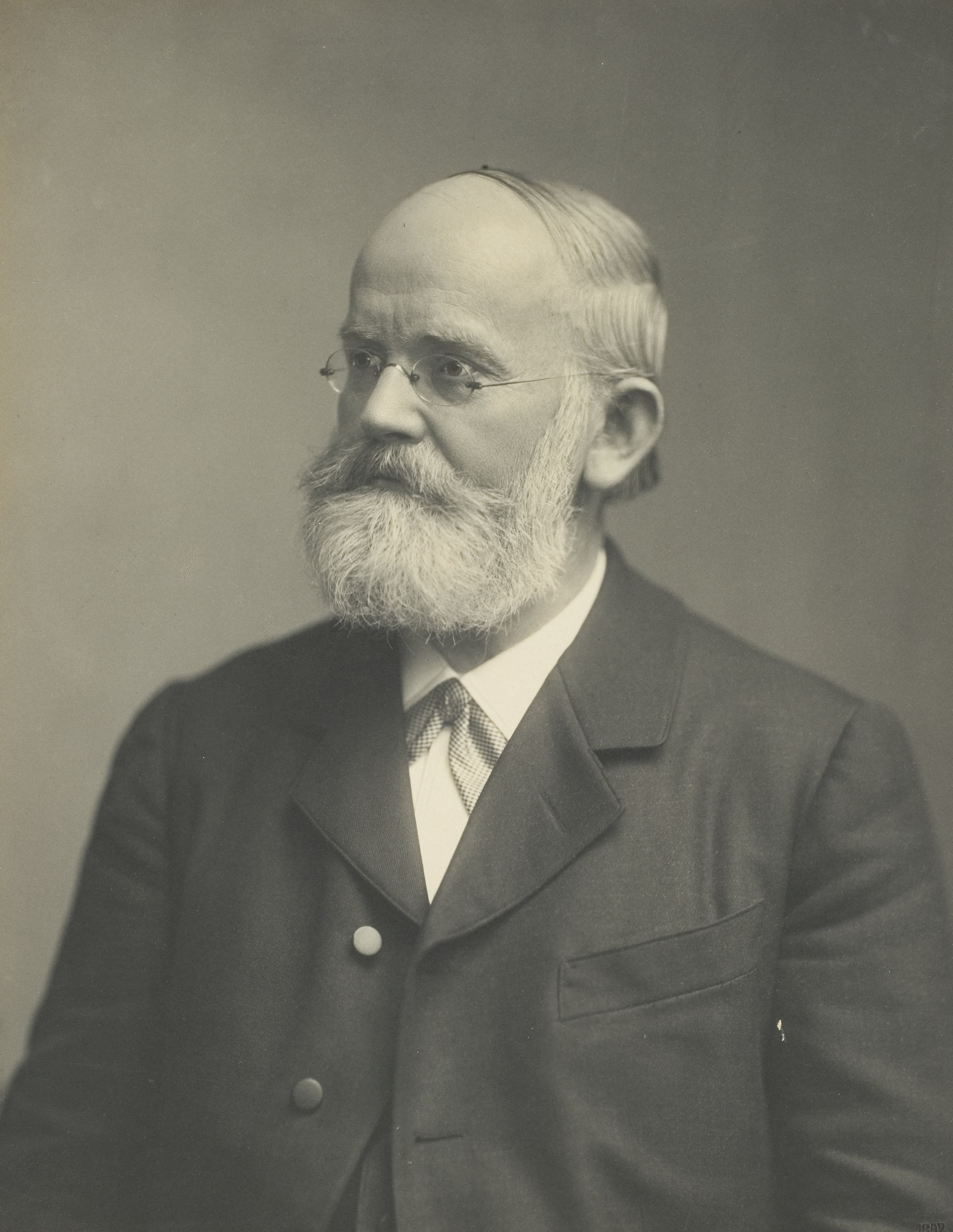
Bernhard Erdmannsdörffer, 1897

Bernhard Erdmannsdörffer (24 January 1833, in Altenburg – 1 March 1901, in Heidelberg) was a German historian. He was the father of mineralogist Otto Erdmannsdörffer.

From 1852 he studied classical philology and history at the University of Jena, subsequently receiving his doctorate under the sponsorship of Johann Gustav Droysen. After conducting research in Italy, he relocated to Berlin in 1861 and collaborated with Droysen and Maximilian Wolfgang Duncker on a massive work involving Frederick William, Elector of Brandenburg, Urkunden und Actenstücke zur Geschichte des Kurfürsten Friedrich Wilhelm von Brandenburg, a project that ultimately grew to 23 volumes, only being finished in 1930.

In 1862 he became a lecturer at the University of Berlin, and two years later, began teaching classes at Berlin's military academy. From 1871 to 1873 he was a professor of modern history at the University of Greifswald, and after a short stay at Breslau, succeeded Heinrich von Treitschke at the University of Heidelberg (1874), where he taught classes in history until his death in 1901.

In 1894 he was awarded the "Verdun Prize" for his magnum opus on German history, titled "Deutsche Geschichte vom Westfälischen Frieden bis zum Regierungsantritt Friedrichs des Großen. 1648–1740" (1892/93).

== Selected works ==
- Graf Georg Friedrich von Waldeck : ein preußischer Staatsmann im siebzehnten Jahrhundert, 1869 – Count Georg Friedrich von Waldeck.
- Politische Correspondenz Karl Friedrichs von Baden: 1783–1806 (6 volumes, 1888 ff.), with Karl Obser. – Political correspondence of Charles Frederick, Grand Duke of Baden.
- Deutsche Geschichte vom Westfälischen Frieden bis zum Regierungsantritt Friedrichs des Großen. 1648–1740, (2 volumes, 1892–93) – German history from the Peace of Westphalia to the accession of Frederick the Great (1648–1740).
- Mirabeau, 1900 – Honoré Gabriel Riqueti, comte de Mirabeau.
