= Pierre Joffroy =

French author, dramaturge and journalist (1922–2008)

Maurice Marcel Weil (2 December 1922 – 4 October 2008), better known by the pen name Pierre Joffroy, was a French author, dramaturge and journalist who wrote for Paris Match, Libération and L'Express.

== Biography ==
Maurice Marcel Weil was born in Hayange, France on 2 December 1922.

As a writer, he adopted the pen name Pierre Joffrey. In France, he released numerous novels, stage plays and articles.

For a period of 30 years he worked on a biography of Kurt Gerstein before he finally released the book A Spy for God, which deals with Kurt Gerstein's story and the decades of the author's research.

Within the framework of an interview with Deutschlandfunk(DLF) the French author declared, that he considered Kurt Gerstein to be "one of the most important persons of World War II".

Joffroy later lived in Paris. He died there on 4 October 2008, at the age of 85.

== Bibliography ==
- Un séjour à Alcatraz, novel 1965
- Les Prétendants, novella 1966
- 1416 ou Punition, stage play 1971
- Parfait Amour, novel 1986.
- A Spy for God, 2002

== Publications ==
Pierre Joffroy, Le retour des bourreaux in : Paris Match, Nr. 831, Paris, 13 March 1965, S. 3–5, 7, 9. (deals with the process of Munich, 1965)
