= Karl Obser =

German archivist and historian

Karl Joseph Obser (16 January 1860, Karlsruhe – 21 January 1944, Karlsruhe) was a German archivist and historian, largely known for his studies on the history of Baden during the 18th and early 19th century.

He studied law, history and German literature at Heidelberg University and the Ludwig-Maximilians-Universität München, obtaining his doctorate in 1883 with a dissertation on early medieval English church history. In 1888, he began work as an assessor at the Generallandesarchiv Karlsruhe (General State Archives at Karlsruhe), where from 1906 to 1924, he served as its director.

In 1888, he became a full member of the Baden Historical Commission. From 1897 to 1927, he was on the editorial board of the Zeitschrift für die Geschichte des Oberrheins, a journal in which he was the author of numerous historical articles.

== Selected works ==
- Wilfrid der Ältere Bischof von York. Ein Beitrag zur angelsächsischen Geschichte des 7. Jahrhunderts. Karlsruhe 1884 – Wilfrid, Bishop of York. A contribution to the Anglo-Saxon history of the 7th century.
- Politische Correspondenz Karl Friedrichs von Baden: 1783 – 1806, Teil 1-6, Heidelberg 1888-1915 (editor; with Bernhard Erdmannsdörffer) – Political correspondence of Charles Frederick, Grand Duke of Baden.
- "Bonaparte, Jean Debry und der Rastatter Gesandtenmord", in: Zeitschrift für die Geschichte des Oberrheins, 48. Jg. 1894, S. 49-78 – Napoleon Bonaparte, Jean Debry and the Rastatt murders.
- Erinnerungen aus dem Hofleben, Heidelberg 1902 (editor) – Memoirs of Freiin Karoline von Freystedt.
- Savigny und die Wiederbelebung der juristischen Studien in Heidelberg unter Grossherzog Karl Friedrich, 1903 – Savigny and the revival of legal studies in Heidelberg under Grand Duke Karl Friedrich.
- Voltaires Beziehungen zu der Markgräfin Karoline Luise von Baden-Durlach und dem Karlsruher Hofe, 1903 – Voltaire's relationship with the Margravine Karoline Luise of Baden-Durlach and the Karlsruhe court.
- Denkwürdigkeiten des Markgrafen Wilhelm von Baden, Heidelberg 1906 (editor) – Memoirs of the Margrave Wilhelm of Baden.
- Frau von Krüdener in der Schweiz und im badischen Seekreis, in: Schriften des Vereins für Geschichte des Bodensees und seiner Umgebung, 39. Jg. 1910, S. 79–93 – Barbara von Krüdener in Switzerland and in Baden Seekreis.
- Quellen zur Bau- und Kunstgeschichte des Ueberlinger Muensters, Karlsruhe 1917 – Sources in regards to the architecture and art history of the Überlingen churches.
- Jugenderinnerungen, 1826–1847, (editor) 1921 – Youthful memoirs of Friedrich I, Grand Duke of Baden.
