= Bendz =

Benz is a surname. Notable people with the surname include:

- Diana Bendz, American polymer scientist and environmental and industrial engineer
- Jacob Christian Bendz (1802–1858), Danish medical doctor, military surgeon, and titular professor
- Sergei Bendz (born 1983), Russian footballer
- Wilhelm Bendz (1804–1832), Danish painter

== See also ==
- Bentz, a surname
- Benz (disambiguation)
