= Kurt Gerstein =

SS officer (1905–1945)

- Kurt Gerstein wearing SS "Germania" collar tab
- Born: 11 August 1905; Münster, Kingdom of Prussia, German Empire
- Died: 25 July 1945 (aged 39); Paris, France
- Military career
- Allegiance: Nazi Germany
- Branch: Schutzstaffel
- Service years: until 1945
- Rank: SS-Obersturmführer
- Units: Death's Head Units

Kurt Gerstein (11 August 1905, Münster, German Empire – 25 July 1945, Paris, France) was a German mining engineer, a member of the Nazi Party from 1933, of the SA in 1934, and later head of the SS Hygiene Institute (Hygiene-Institut der Waffen-SS) from 1941 in Berlin.

In 1942, after witnessing mass murders in the Belzec and Treblinka Nazi extermination camps, Gerstein gave a detailed report to Swedish diplomat Göran von Otter, as well as to Swiss diplomats, members of the Roman Catholic Church with contacts to Pope Pius XII, and to the Dutch government-in-exile, in an effort to inform the international community about the Holocaust as it was happening. In 1945, following his surrender, he wrote the Gerstein Report covering his experience of the Holocaust. During his imprisonment in France later that year, he was found hanged in his cell under circumstances that were never fully clarified.

Gerstein’s legacy endures primarily through his writings, which notably inspired the 1963 play The Deputy by Rolf Hochhuth and the 2002 film Amen. by Costa-Gavras.

== Biography ==
=== Childhood and youth ===
Kurt Gerstein was born on 11 August 1905 into a family originally from Lower Saxony and grew up in Hagen, North Rhine-Westphalia. His father, Louis Gerstein, was a judge, while his mother was responsible for raising their seven children, of whom Kurt was the sixth. Family relationships were often strained, as the household, described as conventional, had difficulty accommodating Gerstein’s nonconformist personality. His father, an authoritarian figure who remained attached to the Germany of Wilhelm II and resentful of the perceived humiliation of the Treaty of Versailles, sought to instill strict obedience and conformity in his son. In a letter dated 5 October 1944, he wrote to Kurt: “You must obey the orders of your superiors. It is the one who gives the orders who bears the responsibility. There can be no disobedience.” A childhood friend later described him as “the black sheep of the family.”

Within the Gerstein household, considerable importance was attached to demonstrating Aryan ancestry, and the family shared antisemitic attitudes that were widespread at the time. Nevertheless, Judge Louis Gerstein warned Jewish lawyers in Hagen of the first anti-Jewish measures introduced by the Nazi regime in 1933 and expressed his regret over these policies. At school, repeated disciplinary measures failed to significantly alter Kurt Gerstein’s behavior. Although an average student academically, he was regarded as intelligent and unconventional. Contemporary accounts describe incidents such as damaging school property, publicly protesting what he considered excessive Latin assignments, and, on one occasion, complying literally with an order from his Greek teacher to return to school after classes by hiring a horse-drawn cab, overtaking the teacher who was walking back. Gerstein ultimately obtained his Abitur at the age of 20.

=== Early relationship with Christianity ===
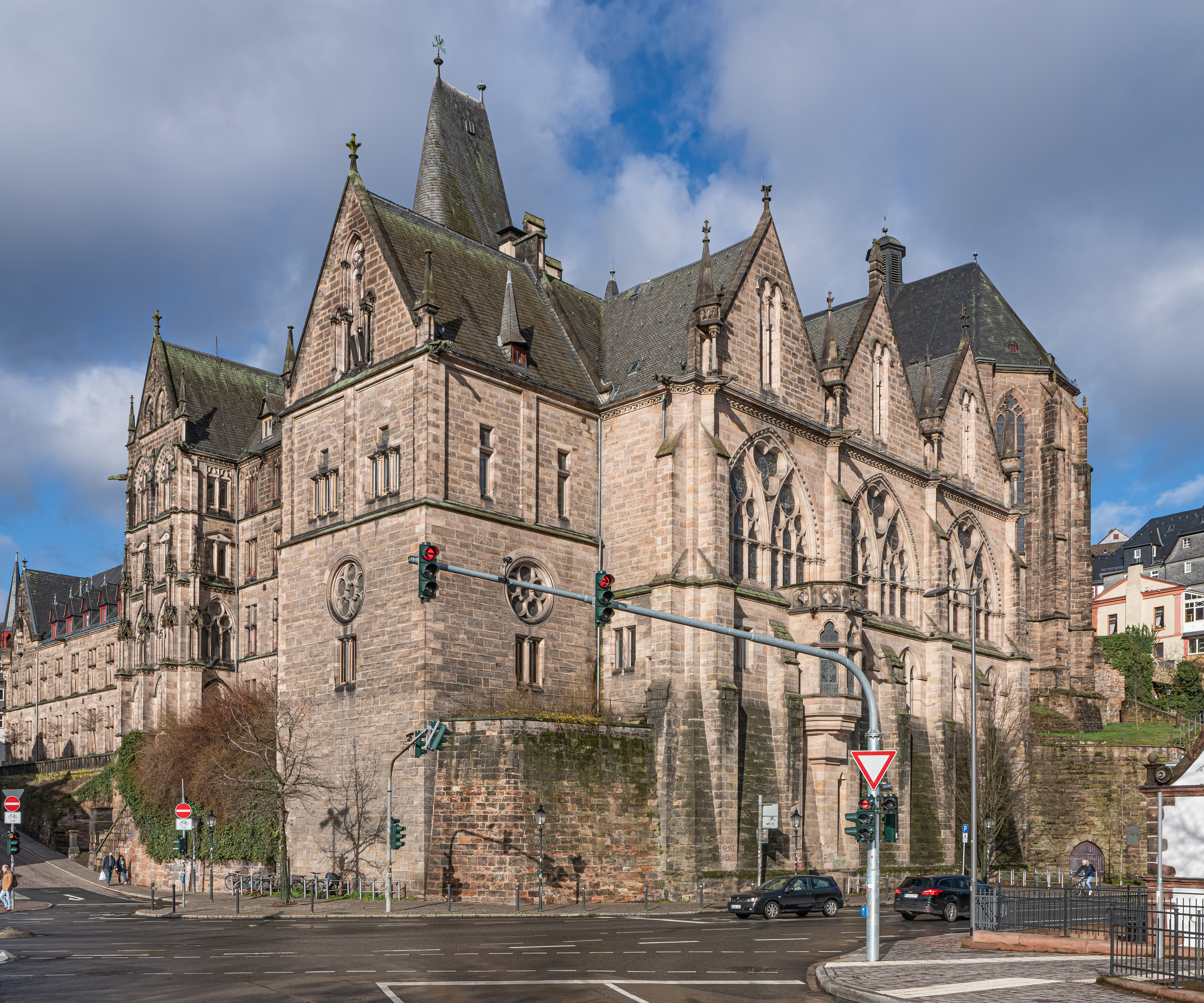
The former University of Marburg.

In 1925, Kurt Gerstein enrolled at the University of Marburg, where, at his father’s request, he joined the student fraternity “Teutonia”. He expressed reservations about what he regarded as the fraternity members’ lack of seriousness and moral rigor. Owing to health problems caused by severe diabetes, he was unable to participate in all of the ritual duels required for full membership and therefore remained a “half-member”. The strong nationalism that characterized “Teutonia” does not appear to have conflicted with his views; Gerstein would continue to identify as a German nationalist for many years.

After approximately eighteen months in Marburg, Gerstein continued his studies in Aachen and later in Berlin-Charlottenburg. In 1931, he graduated with a degree in mining engineering.

Alongside his polytechnic studies, Gerstein was deeply involved in religious activities. A self-published pamphlet, Um Ehre und Reinheit (“On Honor and Purity”), illustrates the importance he attached to religious commitment. In his writings, he emphasized submission to God and personal accountability, themes that also appear in a letter to his father dated 5 March 1944, written from a military hospital in Helsinki. The concept of purity was a recurring theme in his reflections, which he associated with an ideal to be attained; he later described his adolescence as marked by a “sense of guilt and a longing for purity”.

Seeking an alternative to the social environment of his fraternity, Gerstein began reading the Bible and became active within the Protestant Church, where he found a sense of purpose and stability. He soon assumed responsibilities, particularly in youth Bible study groups. At the time, the German Protestant Church generally promoted nationalism and obedience to authority, attitudes that were sometimes accompanied by antisemitism. Organised into twenty-eight regional churches, some Lutheran and others Calvinist, German Protestantism, despite encompassing approximately forty million adherents, proved largely unable to resist the advance of Nazism. Most Protestants aligned themselves with the prevailing ideology, notably within the “German Christians” movement, which supported racist doctrines.

From 1925 onwards, he became active in Christian student and youth movements and joined the German Association of Christian Students (DCSV) in 1925. In 1928, he became an active member of both the Evangelical Youth Movement (CVJM-YMCA) and the Federation of German Bible Circles, where he took a leading role until it was dissolved in 1934 after a takeover attempt by the Hitler Youth movement.

At first finding a religious home within the Protestant Evangelical Church, he gravitated toward the Confessing Church, which formed itself around Pastor Martin Niemöller in 1934, as a form of protest against attempts by the Nazis to exercise increasing control over German Protestants. Initially, however, Adolf Hitler was viewed favorably by several prominent members of the Confessing Church, reflecting attitudes common among Protestants more broadly. For example, 1 May 1933, designated as the “Day of the National Community”, was described by Niemöller as “a day full of joy, a day that awakens hopes”, while the superintendent Otto Dibelius welcomed the Nazi electoral victory as a historic turning point.

Within the Protestant Church and later the Confessing Church, Gerstein worked primarily with young people. His activities included leading prayer meetings and camps, as well as participating in sports and hiking. He joined the Bible circles (Bund deutscher Bibelkreise) in 1928 and became one of their leading figures until their dissolution in 1934. He was known by the nickname Vati (“Dad”), reflecting the respect and affection he inspired among participants. Protestant youth movements of this period tended to reject materialism and emphasized the moral and spiritual renewal of the people. He called the attention of Baldur von Schirach, and consequently, he spent time in prison and concentration camps in the late 1930s.

Over time, elements within German Protestantism increasingly drew parallels between religious authority and political leadership. As Saul Friedländer notes, “it is likely that the combined influences of authoritarian upbringing, nationalist tradition, and the atmosphere within German Protestantism contributed to Kurt Gerstein’s decision to join the National Socialist Party on 2 May 1933”. At that time, Gerstein was 27 years old.

=== Nazi Party and the Sturmabteilung ===
In an apparently contradictory move given his Protestant activism, Kurt Gerstein joined Adolf Hitler’s Nazi Party approximately four months after Hitler’s accession to power. His pastor in Hagen discussed this decision with him and warned him of the violent nature of "National Socialism", but was unable to dissuade Gerstein from participating in national political life. In July 1933, he enrolled in the Sturmabteilung (SA), the original paramilitary militia of the Nazi Party. Friedlander describes the contradictions in Gerstein's mind at the time as "Firm defense of religious concepts and of the honour of the Confessional youth movements, but weakness in the face of National Socialism, with acceptance of its terminology and shoddy rhetoric; acceptance, above all, of the existing political order, of its authoritarianism and its hysterical nationalism".

Gerstein’s entry into the Nazi movement, despite his strong Christian convictions, reflected an enduring ambiguity that would later become more apparent during the war. From the outset, however, his conduct created difficulties for his superiors.

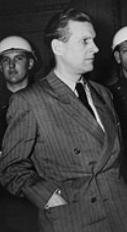
Baldur von Schirach during the Nuremberg trials.

Although a member of the Nazi Party, Gerstein continued to oppose efforts to bring Protestant youth organizations under state control. A particularly intense conflict developed over youth policy between the Church’s Bible Circles (Bund Deutscher Bibelkreise, BK), founded in 1930 and led nationally by Gerstein, and the Hitler Youth, founded in 1926 and headed by Baldur von Schirach. This struggle ended with the dissolution of the Bible Circles in February 1934 and the compulsory incorporation of their members into the Hitler Youth. On 19 December 1933, the Reich Bishop Ludwig Müller announced that the 800,000 Protestant youths were joining the Hitler Youth “spontaneously”. Two days later, Gerstein sent protest telegrams to Schirach and to Bishop Müller. He accused the Hitler Youth leadership of contributing to the “annihilation of German Protestantism” and warned of the consequences for the German people and state. In a message to Bishop Müller, he denounced what he described as the abandonment of Protestant youth work and lamented what he saw as the Church’s capitulation.

At the meeting marking the effective dissolution of the Bible Circles in Hagen, Gerstein addressed their members and supporters. He drew an analogy with the German fleet that had been scuttled rather than surrendered to the British after the Treaty of Versailles, describing this act as “admirable and unique”. He emphasized the symbolic purity of the cause the Bible Circles claimed to uphold, namely service to Jesus Christ and to Germany. In doing so, he reiterated his conviction that Christianity was indispensable to the nation. While acknowledging defeat in organizational terms, he asserted that Christian youth had not been morally overcome by the Hitler Youth, even if the contest had become unequal once the authority of the Führer had been invoked. He concluded by declaring submission to state authority, whose orders were to be accepted without reservation.

After losing this struggle over Protestant youth organizations, Gerstein focused his efforts on supporting the Confessing Church. He expressed indignation at what he viewed as the regime’s failure to honor its commitments and wrote to a friend on 18 March 1934 that public testimony had become for him an inescapable duty, despite unfavorable conditions.

Gerstein devoted significant personal resources to printing and distributing pamphlets outlining his views on the Church, society, and morality. His activism also took more direct forms. On 30 January 1935, he attended a performance in Hagen of the anti-Christian play Wittekind, inspired by the figure of Widukind of Saxony and written by Edmund Kiss. The production, organized by the Hitler Youth, became the scene of disturbances during its subsequent performances. At one such performance, a spectator wearing a Nazi Party badge and accompanied by two SA men publicly protested a blasphemous line and was physically assaulted, sustaining serious injuries. That protester was Gerstein himself.

The tension between Gerstein’s Christian convictions and National Socialist ideology led to repeated confrontations with Nazi organizations. As noted by contemporaries, “incidents with the Hitler Youth and with the Gestapo itself are constantly on the agenda”. Following a Gestapo raid on a youth holiday camp he was directing, Gerstein wrote to the Dortmund Gestapo office, invoking the Führer’s publicly proclaimed guarantee of religious freedom and criticizing measures that, in his view, fostered resentment rather than unity. He concluded the letter with the customary Nazi salutation. In early 1935, he stood up in a theater during a performance of the play Wittekind and vocally protested against its anti-Christian message. In response, he was attacked and beaten by Nazi Party members in the audience.

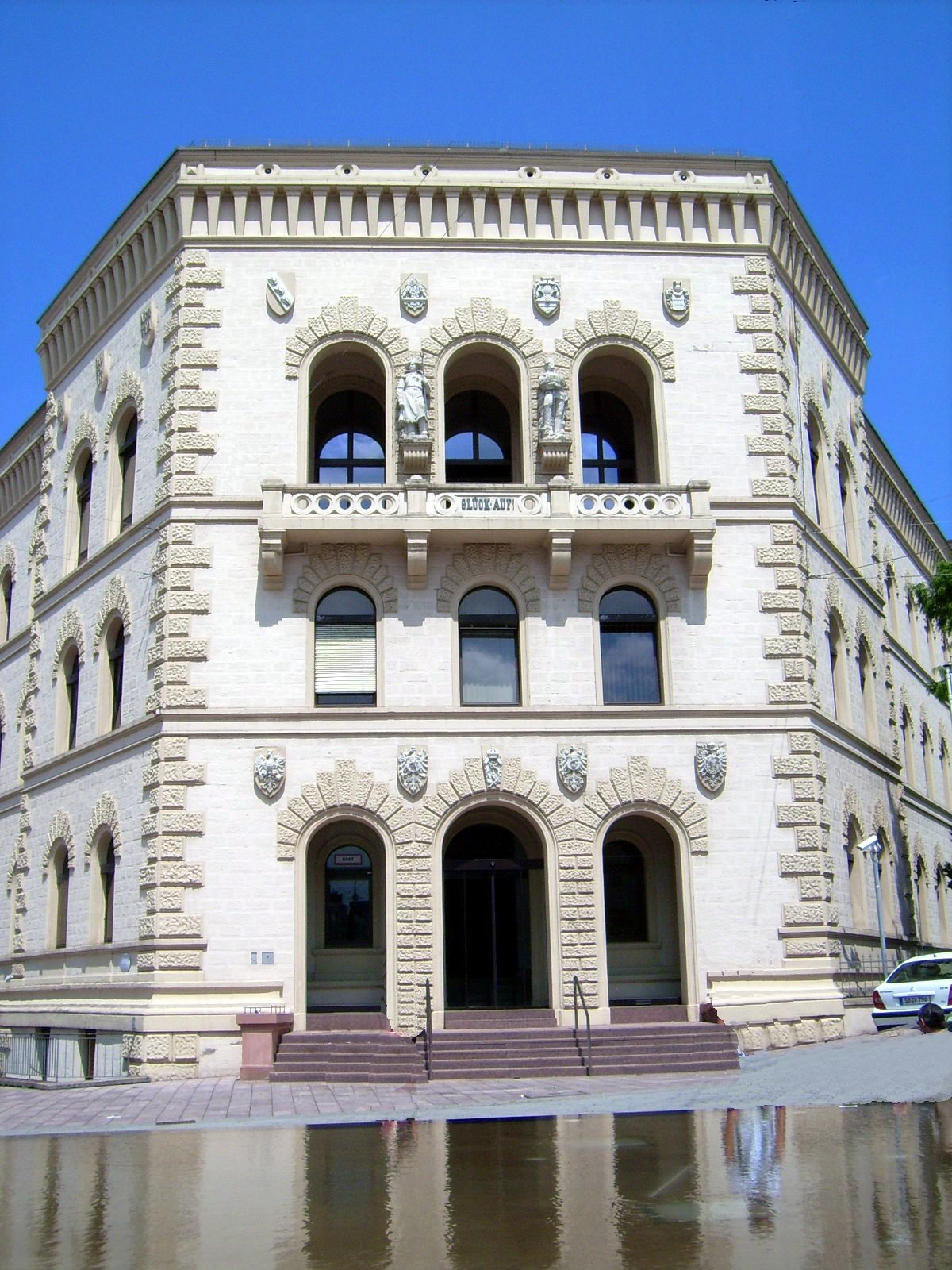
Saarbrücken: headquarters of the Saar coalfields.

Observers within his circle noted during this period that Gerstein appeared increasingly overextended, dividing his efforts among numerous activities and showing signs of exhaustion. His frequent use of irony and provocation ultimately led to his first arrest on 26 September 1936, followed by his expulsion from the Nazi Party on 15 October 1936 for “activities against the party and the state”. The immediate cause was another act of provocation. While organizing in Saarbrücken the first congress of German mining workers following the return of the Saar to Germany, Gerstein enclosed with the invitations two slips of paper bearing the inscriptions “Compartment for travelers accompanied by rabid dogs” and “Compartment for travelers suffering from contagious disease”. A subsequent police search of his home uncovered more than a thousand letters addressed to senior government and judicial officials, each containing banned pamphlets produced by the Confessing Church. These bore titles such as Dechristianization of Youth, A Word on the Situation of the Church, and Commentary on the gendarmerie report (Penzberg/Upper Bavaria) on the refusal to decorate churches on 1 May 1936. The police also found approximately 7,000 pre-addressed empty envelopes intended for further distribution. During interrogation, Gerstein explained that, through conversations with judicial officials visiting his family home, he had concluded that the judiciary was insufficiently informed about the scope of the struggle against the Church.

The dissemination of such pamphlets contravened National Socialist legislation enacted on 20 December 1934 concerning the “defense of the uniform and the party”. Despite interventions on his behalf by senior figures of the Confessing Church and by his father, Gerstein was sentenced to six weeks’ detention in Saarbrücken and formally expelled from the NSDAP by the Gau court of Saar-Palatinate on 15 October 1936. The court nevertheless noted as a mitigating circumstance that Gerstein “had acted out of religious conviction, which appears plausible”.

The loss of membership meant he was unable to find employment as a mining engineer in the state sector. He was arrested a second time in July 1938 but was released six weeks later since no charges were filed against him. With the help of his father and some powerful party and SS officials, he continued to seek reinstatement in the Nazi Party until June 1939, when he obtained a provisional membership.

=== Early career ===
Kurt Gerstein obtained a degree in mining engineering in 1931 and for several years worked without attracting particular attention, gradually advancing within the mining industry. In 1935, he was employed at the Saar mines, a state-run enterprise following the return of the Saar to Germany by plebiscite. It was there that his professional and political trajectories intersected. While organizing a congress of Saar miners, Gerstein engaged in actions that led to his arrest and subsequent exclusion from the Nazi Party in the autumn of 1936 (see above). Although exclusion from the ruling party was in itself a serious setback, particularly for his father, Louis Gerstein, a committed Nazi; it also had immediate professional consequences. Employment in state enterprises required party membership, and as most mines were state-owned, Gerstein was effectively barred from work in his chosen profession. Newly engaged to Elfriede Bensch, the daughter of a pastor, he found himself without employment prospects.

Members of the Gerstein family, including his father and several brothers, made sustained efforts to have Kurt reinstated in the party, which was viewed as the only means of restoring his career. Under considerable family pressure, Gerstein wrote to the regional party court on 28, requesting readmission and affirming his loyalty to the regime. In this letter, he emphasized his opposition to what he described as “Jewish-Bolshevik” influences and to organizations he associated with moral decline. He acknowledged responsibility for his actions and asked only that the penalty of exclusion be lifted. He appeared before the regional party court in Bochum in early January 1937 and later appealed to the Supreme Court of the NSDAP in Munich.

While awaiting a decision, Gerstein settled in Tübingen. There he began studying theology before turning to tropical medicine at the Institute of Protestant Missions.

Lacking regular income and only loosely engaged in his studies, Gerstein devoted much of his time to religious activities and to writing and distributing pamphlets. These publications addressed what he regarded as the moral challenges facing young men in Germany during the 1930s. He argued that nationalism and Christianity were compatible, while criticizing the positions of the “German Christians”. He also organized lectures aimed at raising awareness among youth, attempting to avoid direct confrontation with the authorities. Despite this caution, he was arrested again on 14 on the charge that his behavior was “detrimental to the interests of the people and the state”. In practice, he was suspected of involvement in a monarchist conspiracy. The investigation determined that although he was aware of the plan, he had not actively participated. Nonetheless, he spent six weeks in the Welzheim concentration camp, an experience that had lasting effects on his physical and mental health. During the investigation, Gerstein came into contact with a Gestapo official, Ernst Zerrer, who was sympathetic to him and facilitated his release on 28.

After his release and the formal dismissal of the charge of high treason, Gerstein was left in severe financial difficulty, having spent much of his personal resources on pamphlet production and distribution. Despite their profound ideological differences, Louis Gerstein continued to assist his son, seeking both employment opportunities and reinstatement in the Nazi Party. On 9, he again petitioned the party court, stressing Kurt Gerstein’s inability to support himself or his family and the uncertainty of his future.

In an effort to restore his morale, Kurt Gerstein and his wife undertook a cruise to Rhodes in October. During a stop in Italy, he wrote to a relative who had emigrated to the United States, expressing his intention to leave Germany. By this time, repression of the Confessing Church had intensified: many of its leaders and members had been arrested, and Pastor Martin Niemöller was imprisoned. Gerstein feared that any further incident would result in renewed detention. While his letter to his American relative conveyed despair, a contemporaneous letter to his father expressed confidence in the future of Nazi Germany.

With the assistance of a family friend who was a prominent industrialist, Gerstein soon obtained a position in Merkers (Thuringia) at a potash mine operated by the private company Wintershall. He remained there until October 1940.

=== World War Two ===
He volunteered successively for the Heer in October 1939, for the Luftwaffe in July 1940 and finally for the Waffen-SS in December of the same year. During this period, he maintained close contact with Nazi circles and collaborated with the Hitler Youth at what he described to a friend as relatively senior levels. In October 1940, he left his position at Wintershall to work at his grandfather’s locomotive pump factory in Düsseldorf where he remained until 5 March 1941.

In February 1941, Gerstein’s family received the funeral urn of Berthe Ebeling, a relative who had been institutionalized for mental illness and was said to have died of natural causes in a psychiatric clinic. Gerstein rejected this explanation and asserted that she had been killed at the Hadamar facility as part of the Aktion T4 program, a state-run euthanasia campaign targeting people deemed “unfit”, including those with mental illnesses and disabilities. He subsequently resolved to seek access to the centers of power responsible for such policies in order to understand their operation.

To his Protestant associates, many of whom were surprised by what they regarded as a reversal by a figure who had previously advocated resistance, Gerstein justified his actions as an attempt to gain insight into the regime’s activities and to expose crimes from within. This strategy was perceived by some as misguided or as a form of betrayal, and several personal relationships were severed as a result. His application to the Waffen-SS was accepted in March 1941. In later accounts, Gerstein attributed this outcome to the support of two Gestapo references; one of these, Ernst Zener, subsequently denied involvement and suggested instead the discreet intervention of a senior official. According to later research, this may have been Walter Schellenberg, head of the Sicherheitsdienst (SD), whom Gerstein’s father contacted through an intermediary. Browning describes him as "a covert anti-Nazi who infiltrated the SS", and in a letter to his wife, Gerstein wrote: "I joined the SS... acting as an agent of the Confessing Church." In any case, Gerstein, previously active in the Confessing Church, was admitted to the SS, in which he served until the end of the war.

Owing to his background as a mining engineer and his medical training, Gerstein was assigned to the Hygiene Institute at SS headquarters in Berlin, where he worked in the “Water Hygiene” department under Dr. Krantz, along with Odilo Globocnik and Christian Wirth. The Hygiene Institute of the Waffen-SS was responsible for sanitary oversight of concentration camps and, under the pretext of disinfection, for the development and supply of toxic gases. He supplied hydrogen cyanide (Zyklon B) to Rudolf Höss in Auschwitz from the Degesch company (Deutsche Gesellschaft für Schädlingsbekämpfung Vermin-Combating Corporation") and conducted the negotiations with the owners. On 17 August 1942, together with Rolf Günther and Wilhelm Pfannenstiel, Gerstein witnessed at Belzec the gassing of some 3,000 Jews who had arrived by train from Lwow. The next day, he went to Treblinka, which had similar facilities, and he observed huge mounds of clothing and underwear, which had been removed from the victims. At the time, motor exhaust gases were used for mass murder in both extermination camps. Reflecting later on his posting, Gerstein wrote that his assignment placed him unexpectedly close to the core of Nazi power, despite his prior conflicts with the regime, an outcome he regarded as extraordinary given his past. Historian Pierre Joffroy characterized this position as that of an “archangel who demanded a folding seat in hell—and obtained it.”

After completing a course at the disinfectors’ school in Oranienburg, Gerstein was tasked with epidemic prevention, particularly against typhus, among troops and in camps, through water treatment and disinfection. He devised an improved system for water disinfection that was well received by his superiors and led to his promotion. In November 1941, he was appointed second lieutenant and placed in charge of the “Technical Hygiene” section, responsible for disinfection methods. His duties involved extensive travel across occupied Europe, including France, to oversee the manufacture and deployment of equipment and to inspect barracks and prisoner-of-war camps.

In November 1941, Gerstein was recognized at the funeral of his brother Alfred by a magistrate who had previously taken part in his expulsion from the Nazi Party. Unaware of Gerstein’s reinstatement, the magistrate reported his presence in SS uniform to authorities connected to Heinrich Himmler. The Sicherheitsdienst subsequently informed the head of the Hygiene Institute, Joachim Mrugowsky. Gerstein was placed under renewed Gestapo surveillance, temporarily prohibited from wearing uniform or carrying a weapon, and had his authority curtailed. He was not dismissed, however, as his technical expertise was considered indispensable, and Mrugowsky intervened on his behalf.

Gerstein continued clandestine efforts to assist detainees. During inspections, he sometimes left food or cigarettes in areas accessible to prisoners. He also facilitated the recruitment of several trusted individuals into the Hygiene Institute, including Horst Dickten, for whom he had previously served as a guardian.

According to Gerstein’s postwar testimony, in early June 1942 he was assigned an ultra-secret mission by Sturmbannführer Günther of the Jewish Affairs section under Adolf Eichmann at the RSHA. He was instructed to transport and test potassium cyanide or hydrogen cyanide at the Bełżec extermination camp in occupied Poland, with the aim of evaluating alternatives to killing by carbon monoxide. During this visit, a malfunctioning diesel engine delayed the gassing process. The camp commandant, Christian Wirth, reportedly asked Gerstein not to recommend adoption of the new method, a request to which Gerstein agreed; the 100 kilograms (220 lb) of Zyklon B brought to the site was subsequently buried.

On the return journey, on 20 August 1942, Gerstein spoke to Baron Göran von Otter, secretary of the Swedish consulate in Berlin, and described the extermination he had witnessed. Von Otter later recorded the conversation, but his report was not acted upon at the time. Back in Berlin, Gerstein attempted to inform the apostolic nunciature but was refused an audience, an experience from which he reportedly never fully recovered. He continued to alert various religious leaders and representatives of neutral states, without success. His final effort, through contacts in the Netherlands, was to convey his account to British authorities, who dismissed it as unreliable.

=== Prisoner ===
Aware that the collapse of the regime was imminent, Kurt Gerstein left Berlin in March 1945 under the pretext of a business trip. He arrived in Tübingen on 26 March 1945, where he spent several days with his wife and their three children. According to a letter written by Elfriede Gerstein in 1965, Gerstein believed that American forces were closer to Tübingen than was in fact the case. Cut off from Berlin by the advancing front, he was unable to return to the capital. Seeking not to endanger his family, he left Tübingen and did not see his wife and children again. After the city came under Allied control, his return was no longer possible. He then stayed in Urach with physician friends until rumors circulated that an SS unit was approaching the town. Having had no contact with his superiors for nearly a month, Gerstein risked being regarded as a deserter; encountering disorganized SS units was therefore considered particularly dangerous. He decided to surrender to Allied forces, specifically the French units operating in the region.

On 22 April 1945, Gerstein surrendered to the French command in Reutlingen and presented himself as an opponent of the Nazi regime. He was held under parole conditions in a hotel in Rottweil until 26 May, during which time he drafted a written account describing his activities and denouncing Nazi crimes. In a letter to his wife dated 26 May, he characterized his work within the SSFHA as being undertaken, from the outset, in the service of the Confessing Church. He was then transferred to the ORCG (Organe de recherche des crimes de guerre, War Crimes Investigation Office). Gerstein initially expressed confidence about his situation, writing to his wife that there was strong interest in his testimony and that he expected to appear before an international tribunal as a witness against war criminals.

Transferred to Paris, Gerstein was interrogated by French investigators. On 26 June, during questioning by Commander Beckhardt of the ORCG, he presented himself as having played a central role in Protestant resistance networks, claiming contacts in the Netherlands, Sweden, and Switzerland. He stated that he had become aware of plans to use cyanide and that he sought both to obstruct their implementation and to inform those involved in production of their lethal purpose. Lieutenant Colonel Mantout, head of the ORCG, who attended the interrogation, later described Gerstein as a deeply traumatized individual, distressed that his warnings had not been taken seriously by either German or Allied authorities.

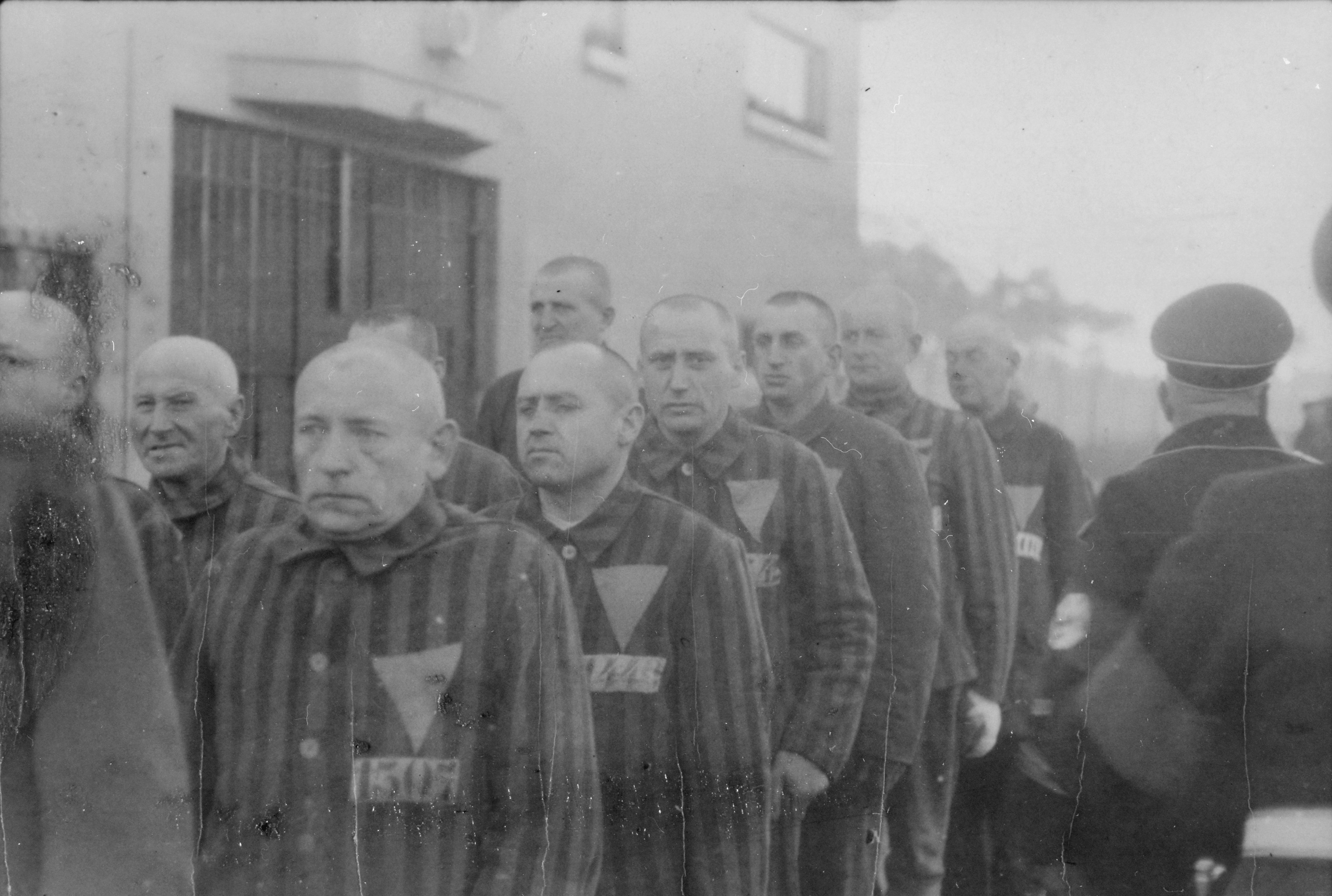
At the Oranienburg-Sachsenhausen concentration camp.

On 13 and 19 July 1945, Gerstein summarized his wartime career for the investigating magistrate. He stated that he initially held no clearly defined role, before later focusing on disinfection equipment and water sanitation. He reported that he carried out these duties until April 1945, including missions with manufacturing firms and inspections of sanitary installations at Oranienburg (twice), Droegen (twice), Ravensbrück, Bełżec, Treblinka, Majdanek, and the Heinkel works.

French authorities nevertheless suspected Gerstein of involvement in the development or supply of homicidal gas chambers, and his account was considered by investigators to contain numerous implausibilities. He was charged with direct or indirect participation in the murder of deportees, notably through the delivery of 260 kilograms of cyanide allegedly intended for use in gas chambers. Imprisoned at the Cherche-Midi Prison in Paris, he was treated as a suspected Nazi war criminal and detained pending trial before a military tribunal. On 20 July 1945, he was placed in solitary confinement. In an unfinished letter, he asked a Dutch acquaintance to testify on his behalf.

Gerstein was found hanged on 25 July 1945. His death was officially ruled a suicide. Some historians, including Alain Decaux, have raised doubts about this conclusion, citing reported injuries and inconsistencies in the chronology, and have suggested the possibility of homicide.

== Kurt Gerstein’s accounts ==
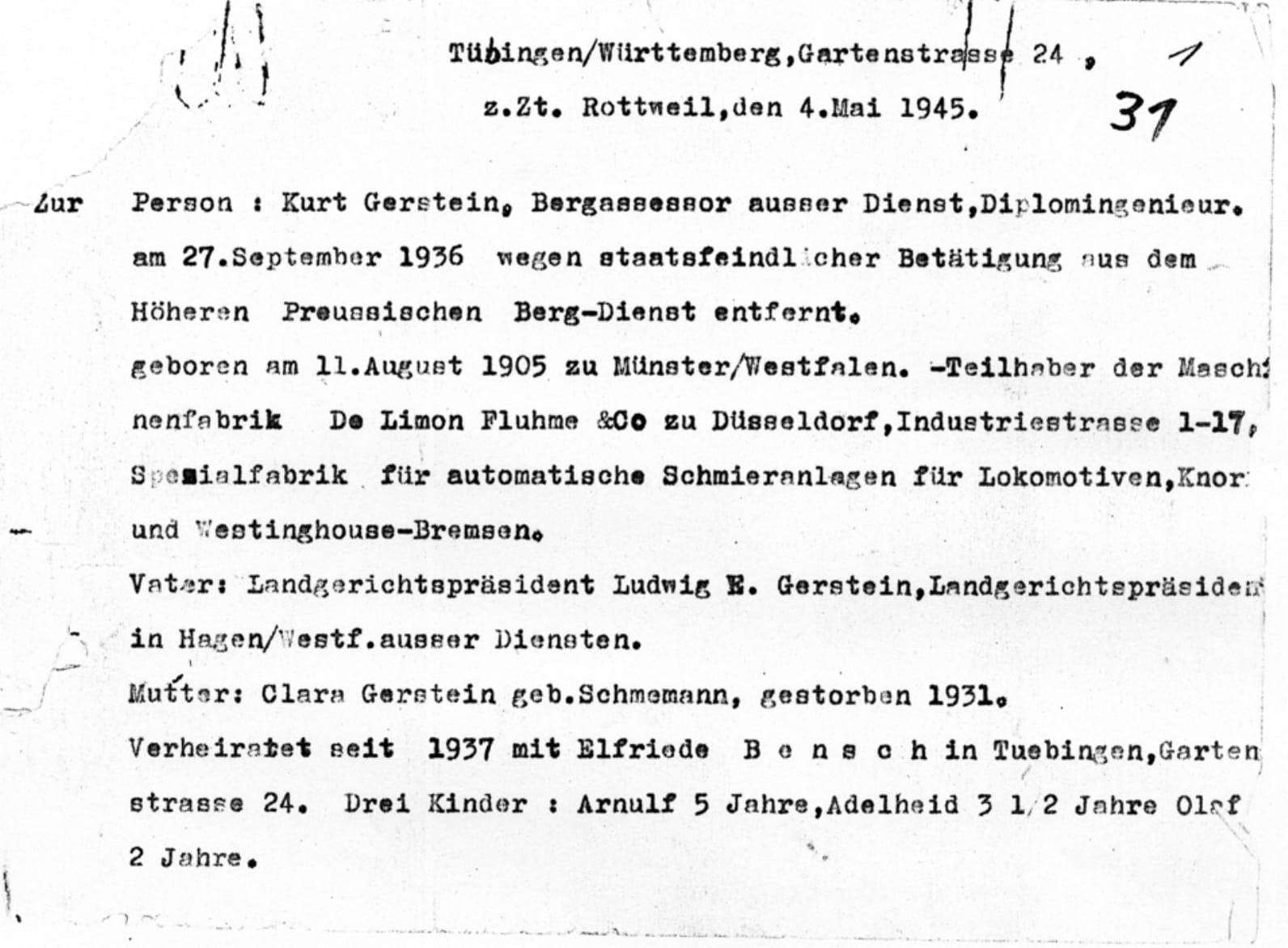
Page 1 (of 33) of the Kurt Gerstein Report, version of 4 May 1945.

Gerstein had a chance encounter on the Warsaw-to-Berlin train with the Swedish diplomat Göran von Otter, who was stationed in Berlin. In a conversation that lasted several hours, he told the diplomat what he had seen and urged him to spread the information internationally. In the meantime, Gerstein tried to make contact with representatives of the Vatican, the press attaché at the Swiss legation in Berlin and a number of people linked to the Confessing Church.

One of his contacts was the Dutch citizen J.H. Ubbink, whom he asked to pass on his testimony to the Dutch resistance. A little later, an unnamed member of the Dutch government-in-exile, in London, noted in his diary a testimony that is very similar to Gerstein's report. Gerstein's statements to diplomats and religious officials over from 1942 to 1945 had little effect.

After his surrender in April 1945, Gerstein was ordered to report about his experiences with gassing and the extermination camps in French, followed by two German versions in May 1945.

The historian Christopher Browning noted, "Many aspects of Gerstein's testimony are unquestionably problematic.... [In making] statements, such as the height of the piles of shoes and clothing at Belzec and Treblinka, Gerstein himself is clearly the source of exaggeration. Gerstein also added grossly exaggerated claims about matters to which he was not an eyewitness, such as that a total of 25 million Jews and others were gassed. But in the essential issue, namely that he was in Belzec and witnessed the gassing of a transport of Jews from Lviv, his testimony is fully corroborated.... It is also corroborated by other categories of witnesses from Belzec". French historian Pierre Vidal-Naquet, in Assassins of Memory, discusses such criticism.

Kurt Gerstein’s testimony is preserved in two principal bodies of documents:

The interrogations conducted in Paris, in particular that of 19 July. Gerstein’s statements in these interrogations can be divided into two main topics: the mission leading to the extermination camp at Bełżec and his stay there, as well as his subsequent visits to Treblinka and Majdanek. The interrogation of 19 July constitutes the principal source for the account of the mission to Bełżec, while the written report is the main source for the description of events at the camps.

Note: The excerpts reproduce verbatim the text of Kurt Gerstein’s report as edited by Pierre Joffroy in the appendix to his book L’espion de Dieu. La passion de Kurt Gerstein. The quotations retain syntactic, spelling, and stylistic irregularities, as well as typographical inconsistencies, in order to reflect Gerstein’s original wording while he was in Allied detention.

=== First part ===
In early June 1942, Sturmbannführer (major) Günther appeared in Gerstein’s office and instructed him to take delivery, in Kollin near Prague, of 260 kilograms of potassium cyanide (described as 100 kilograms of prussic acid in Gerstein’s “report”) and to transport it to a destination known only to the driver of the vehicle, who was himself attached to the RSHA. Günther stated that he had personally determined the quantity of the substance in order to "make full use of the car's carrying capacity" and had selected the Kollin factory. The mission was explicitly placed under the seal of state secrecy. Gerstein later stated that he had been chosen “at random by appointment from some leader or other” of the chemistry department to which Günther had applied, and “because he was considered an expert in the use of cyanide for disinfection,” which he said was stored in containers designed “in such a way that the liquid became volatile.”

Regarding the homicidal use of potassium cyanide, Gerstein asserted that “Günther had no idea. He assumed I must have one. But in reality, I didn't...” In addition to transporting the victims, he was “responsible for taking all necessary measures to [...] replace the toxic diesel engine with cyanide as a means of extermination.” In Kollin, forty-five steel cylinders containing cyanide were loaded, and Dr. Pfannenstiel joined the party as an additional passenger, “still having room in the car.” From the driver, he received “instructions along the way [...] to go to Lublin, to SS Gruppenführer (Major General) Globocnik, who commanded the four extermination camps.” Gerstein stated that he was received by Globocnik on 17 August. During this meeting, Globocnik reportedly told him that Hitler and Himmler had visited him two days earlier to demand an acceleration of the killing process. According to Gerstein, Globocnik emphasized the secrecy of the operation and described the extermination facilities as follows: "This thing is the most secret thing there is. Anyone who talks about it will be shot. Yesterday, two talkers died. [...] There are three facilities: 1. Belzec [...], maximum 15,000 people per day; 2. Sobibor [...], 20,000 people per day; 3. Treblinka [...], 25,000 per day; 4. Maidannek, seen in preparation."

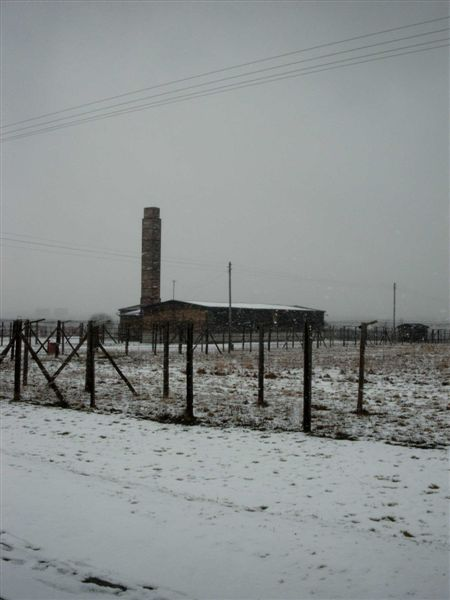
Majdanek.

According to Gerstein, Globocnik ordered him to go to Belzec, specifying that he would also go “because no one could be admitted to the camp without being introduced by the general himself.” One of the bottles of cyanide was, on the way, "emptied by me with all the necessary precautions, because it was dangerous. [...] The remaining forty-four bottles were not taken to the Belzec camp but were hidden by the driver and myself about twelve hundred meters from the camp." This was possible because “the driver got scared on the way and, since we had loaded the poison, he was only too happy to see me get rid of what he considered to be a danger.”

At Bełżec, on 18 August 1942, Gerstein reported that he justified the non-delivery of the cyanide by citing its danger. He later summarized his explanation to the camp commandant as follows:

I indicated to the camp commandant the danger presented by cyanide, informing him that I could not assume responsibility for the use of the cyanide I had brought. The commandant was a poorly educated man and contented himself with my explanations, stating moreover that he was satisfied with the extermination system in use.

To Commander Mattei, who expressed his disbelief: "You were given a mission in Berlin so important that you had to carry it out as a state secret; you visited three camps, you were received in audience by a general who, given the purpose of your mission, felt compelled to report to you the very words of the two great Nazi leaders. How can you persist in making us believe: 1. that you did not fulfill the very purpose of your mission; 2. that you did not report to anyone about it; 3. that no one asked you anything about it either?“ Kurt Gerstein replied, ”Hauptmann Wirth [the real camp commander, who was present the day after Gerstein's arrival] had such a personal position with Hitler and Himmler that he was able to tell me not to concern myself with this matter any further."

On 20 August 1942, Gerstein stated that he was taken to Majdanek and Treblinka “by Hauptmann Wirth and Professor Dr. Pfannenstiel to [examine] on site the possibilities of replacing the extermination system used (toxic diesel engine) with cyanide.”

=== Second part ===
According to his report, Kurt Gerstein arrived at Bełżec in occupied Poland on 17 August 1942. He stated that Hauptsturmführer (captain) Obermeyer of Pirmasens, to whom General Globocnik introduced him, conducted a tour of the camp. Gerstein noted the presence of a strong and pervasive odor in the area, which he attributed to mass graves in which victims’ bodies were buried. On the following day, he reported witnessing the arrival of a transport of deportees.

Plan of the Bełżec extermination camp, Poland.

Gerstein described the convoy as consisting of “45 train cars, carrying 6,700 people, 1,450 already dead upon arrival.” According to his account, the remaining 5,250 individuals were ordered to undress. He mentioned that a four-year-old Jewish boy distributed pieces of string to allow shoes to be tied together, and that women had their hair cut, which was collected. Gerstein wrote that the deportees were then led toward the gas chambers, stating: "guided by an extraordinarily beautiful young girl, [...] completely naked, men, women, young girls, children, babies [...] make their way to the death chambers [...]. Most [of them] know everything. The smell [of stench] tells them their fate [...]." And: “The naked men stand at the foot of the others, 700-800 in 25 square meters, in 45 cubic meters! [...].”

Gerstein further reported that after the doors were closed, the diesel engine used to generate lethal exhaust fumes failed to start. Together with Dr. Pfannenstiel, he observed events while Wirth reacted angrily to the malfunction. Looking through a peephole, Gerstein stated that he timed the process with his watch:

50 minutes, 70 minutes, the diesel engine isn't working! The men wait in their gas chambers. [...] After two hours and 49 minutes—the clock recorded everything—the diesel engine starts. Until that moment, the men in the four chambers, already filled to capacity, live, live, 4 times 750 people in four times 45 cubic meters.

He continued that after an additional period, deaths occurred as follows:

Many, it is true, are dead [...] After 28 minutes, few remain alive; after 32 minutes, finally—all are dead! On the other side, Jewish workers open the wooden doors [...]. Like columns of basalt, the dead still stand, having no room to fall or bow [...]. The blue, sweat-drenched bodies are thrown away [...]. Dentists use hammers to pull out gold teeth [...]. The naked bodies were thrown into large pits measuring approximately 100 × 20 × 12 meters, located near the death chambers. After a few days, the bodies swelled and rose 2-3 meters due to the gas that formed in the corpses. After a few days, the swelling subsided and the bodies fell together. The next day, the pits were filled again and covered with 10 cm of sand.

Gerstein stated that on the next day, 20 August, he visited Treblinka, which he described as having “Eight gas chambers and mountains of clothes and linen, approximately 34-40 meters high!”. He also reported visiting Majdanek, which he characterized as still being in preparation.

Gerstein further claimed that at the beginning of 1944, Günther requested large quantities of prussic acid “for an obscure purpose. The acid was to be delivered to Berlin.” According to Gerstein, the scale of the order led him to fear that it might be intended for mass killing, possibly of German civilians, foreign laborers, or prisoners of war. He referred to a statement attributed to Goebbels and wrote: "close the doors behind them, if Nazism would never succeed. […] I have notes weighing 2,175 kg on me, but in reality it is approximately 8,500 kg, enough to kill 8 million people." He stated that he complied with the delivery order but subsequently arranged for the substance to be diverted to disinfection purposes. He explained that he had the delivery documents issued in his own name: “I had the notes written in my name for reasons of discretion, as I said, but in truth it was to give me some freedom in the arrangements and to better remove the toxic acid”, and that he deliberately did not pay the invoices to Degesch, the supplier.

Gerstein concluded his interrogation by estimating: “In the three camps I visited, approximately thirty-five thousand Jews died on the day of my visit [...]. Without being very precise, I can say that the extermination system must have begun in April 1942. I think the extermination lasted throughout the war, as I never heard that it had stopped.” He stated that the RSHA unit responsible for the operation “was called Einsatz Reinhardt”.

Gerstein ended his report with the declaration: “I am prepared to swear that all my statements are completely true.”

== Judicial analysis ==
Immediately after the end of hostilities, in the summer of 1945, French investigators questioned Kurt Gerstein’s credibility and expressed skepticism regarding the scale and nature of the crimes he described.

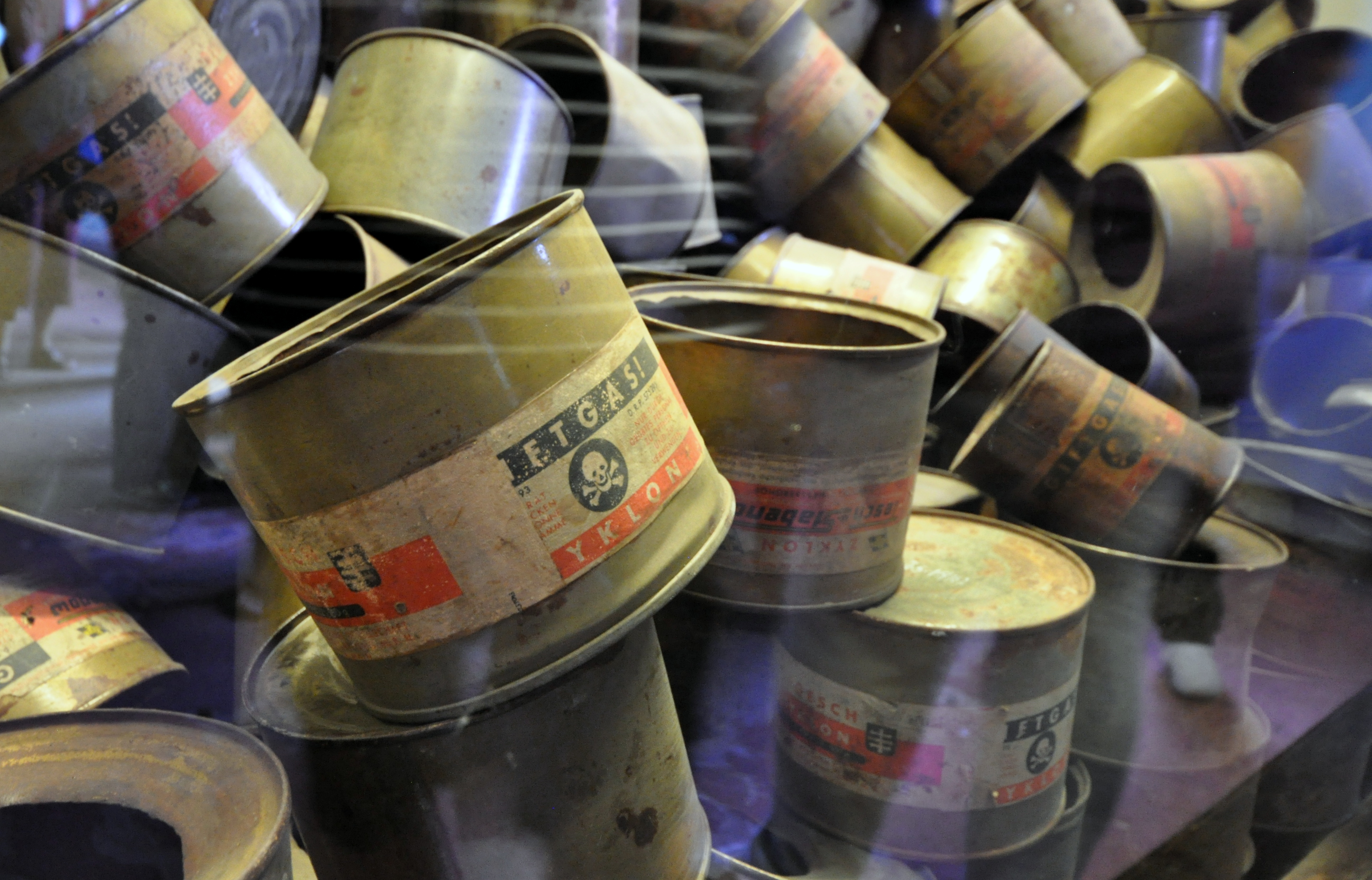
Zyklon B canisters at Auschwitz.

In 1950, the denazification chamber in Tübingen declined to clear Gerstein’s name. The judges acknowledged that “By informing senior figures in the Protestant Church and members of the Dutch resistance about these exterminations [...] and rendering two shipments of prussic acid unusable, Gerstein acted in resistance and thus took great risks.” They nevertheless concluded that "In view of the horror of the crimes committed, this attitude [...] cannot completely exonerate him from his shared responsibility. [...] Kurt Gerstein should have refused with all his might to become an intermediary in an organized extermination. The Chamber is of the opinion that he did not do everything in his power to this end, and that he could have found other ways to distance himself from this action. It is neither understandable nor excusable that a devout Christian such as he [...] agreed [...] to place orders with the Degesch company (Deutsche Gesellschaft für Schädlingsbekämpfung, the company that supplied Zyklon B gas to the hygiene services headed by Gerstein)." The chamber concluded “That he alone could not prevent the exterminations or save even a small number of lives was something he should have understood clearly after what he had seen at Belzec. The Chamber therefore granted Gerstein mitigating circumstances and did not count him among the main criminals, but among the 'Belastete'."

Five years later, the “Gerstein case” was again examined by the court in Frankfurt during the appeal proceedings of Gerhard Peters, former director of Degesch. The court compared three versions of Gerstein’s report (one in French and two in German) and heard testimony from numerous witnesses, including SS personnel stationed at Auschwitz and individuals to whom Gerstein had confided. The purpose was to determine the fate of the large quantities of poison ordered in Gerstein’s name. Following the hearings and textual analysis, described by Saul Friedländer as the most systematic investigation undertaken on the subject, the court reached the following conclusions:

According to these testimonies, Gerstein represented the type of man who, by virtue of his deepest convictions, disavowed, indeed inwardly hated, the Nazi regime, but participated in it in order to fight it from within and to avert something even worse. Gerstein, however, was only an SS Obersturmführer and represented within this formidable machinery only a relatively secondary cog, whose role was limited to a clearly defined domain. Despite the greatest efforts and the best intentions, he did not have sufficient importance or influence to stop this machine, or, more precisely, to act on what lay outside the framework of his domain. The machine was stronger than he was. He eventually realized this and suffered greatly from it.

In summary, the court finds that:

The Zyklon B ordered by Gerstein was delivered for purposes of killing; Gerstein did not order the Zyklon B on his own initiative, but on the orders of his hierarchical superiors in the SS;

Gerstein attempted to divert the Zyklon B to purposes other than killing, but it could not be excluded that he did not succeed entirely in doing so.

Despite these findings, it was not until five years later that the judgment of the Tübingen denazification chamber was formally reconsidered and Gerstein rehabilitated. This rehabilitation occurred not through a court ruling but by administrative decision of the Minister-President of Baden-Württemberg, Kurt Kiesinger. On 20 January 1965, Kiesinger declared that “Gerstein fought against National Socialism to the extent of his strength and suffered as a result”.

This decision restored Gerstein’s civil status and enabled his widow to receive a pension. Historians have noted, however, that it did not directly address the earlier reproach that his efforts had been ineffective. Saul Friedländer has interpreted this tension as illustrating the broader ambiguity surrounding Gerstein’s actions and, more generally, the dilemma faced by individuals who sought to oppose a totalitarian regime from within its structures.

== Historians’ analysis ==
In Le Bréviaire de la Haine, published in 1951, Léon Poliakov became the first historian to publish and assess Kurt Gerstein’s testimony in detail. Poliakov accepted the core of the account as credible, emphasizing Gerstein’s decision to enter the SS in order to attempt to undermine the extermination process from within and his efforts to alert external actors, notably the Swedish diplomat Baron Göran von Otter. Poliakov noted that Gerstein believed that “As soon as the broad masses of the German population learned of this extermination, which would be confirmed to them by unbiased foreigners, the German people would no longer tolerate the Nazis for a single day.” Poliakov also observed that Gerstein unsuccessfully sought an audience with the papal nuncio in Berlin and that the Swedish authorities did not transmit von Otter’s report to the British government until after the war had ended.

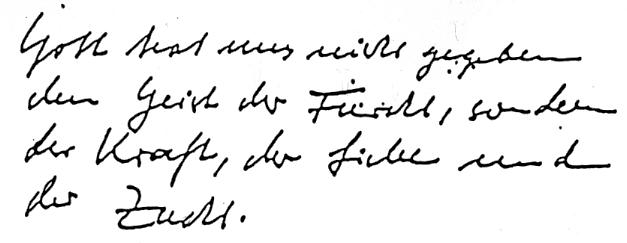
Gerstein manuscript.

Saul Friedländer’s biographical study, published in 1967 as Kurt Gerstein ou l'ambiguïté du Bien, likewise accepted the essential veracity of Gerstein’s testimony. Friedländer nevertheless highlighted the ambiguities of Gerstein’s character, particularly regarding the motivations that led him first to join the Nazi Party and later the SS, as well as his belief that it was possible to oppose radical evil from within its institutional structures. Friedländer concluded that this ambiguity was largely the result of Gerstein’s isolation: had a larger number of Germans attempted similar forms of internal resistance, Gerstein might have been regarded as a hero rather than as a tragic and morally compromised figure.

In his later major work on the Holocaust, L'Allemagne nazie et les Juifs, 1939–1945, Friedländer again relied on Gerstein’s testimony concerning the gassing he witnessed at Bełżec in August 1942, as well as his attempt to alert a Swedish diplomat, without expressing doubts as to its factual basis. In the same work, Friedländer described Gerstein as “exceptional and unique as a morally tormented but also ‘traitor’ member of the extermination system”.

Raul Hilberg likewise confirmed Gerstein’s role in the procurement of Zyklon B intended for Auschwitz, as well as his presence at Bełżec in August 1942. Hilberg accepted as credible Gerstein’s account of witnessing a carbon monoxide gassing prolonged by a diesel engine failure, as well as his disclosure of the extermination process to Baron von Otter during a train journey between Warsaw and Berlin in late summer 1942.

Historian Uwe Dietrich Adam emphasized that certain numerical estimates provided by Gerstein, particularly regarding the number of victims at Bełżec, were implausible, but argued that such errors did not invalidate the testimony as a whole. On the contrary, Adam suggested that these inaccuracies reflected the conditions under which the account was produced and did not undermine Gerstein’s credibility or good faith.

Differences among the various versions of the Gerstein Report and certain evident numerical errors were later exploited by Holocaust deniers in attempts to discredit the existence of gas chambers. Historians have noted that such arguments focus on peripheral inconsistencies while disregarding the substantial body of corroborating evidence, including the postwar testimony of the SS physician Pfannenstiel, who accompanied Gerstein to Bełżec and testified on multiple occasions before German courts.

In 1985, Henri Roques submitted a doctoral dissertation at the University of Nantes entitled Les confessions de Kurt Gerstein. Étude comparative des différentes versions, which adopted a denialist perspective. Although initially accepted, the thesis provoked widespread controversy and was subsequently annulled; one member of the jury, Pierre Zind, was compelled to retire. The dissertation was later critically examined and rejected by several historians, including Pierre Bridonneau and Pierre Vidal-Naquet, who argued that multiple independent testimonies and documents convincingly established that Gerstein witnessed a gassing at Bełżec.

In 1999, historian Christopher Browning, serving as an expert witness for the defense in the libel case brought by David Irving against Penguin Books and Deborah Lipstadt, assessed Gerstein’s testimony in detail. Browning concluded that while several aspects of Gerstein’s account contained exaggerations or inaccuracies—particularly regarding statements attributed to Globocnik and figures outside Gerstein’s direct observation—the central claim that Gerstein was present at Bełżec and witnessed a gassing was corroborated by Pfannenstiel and by other categories of witnesses from the camp.

== Popular culture ==
The playwright Rolf Hochhuth wrote, in the early 1960s, the play Der Stellvertreter. Ein christliches Trauerspiel (published in French as The Deputy), which drew in part on the testimony of Kurt Gerstein. The play premiered in 1963 in Berlin under the direction of Erwin Piscator.

A biography by Pierre Joffroy, A Spy for God, was published in English in paperback in 1971.

His search for Christian values and ultimate decision to betray the SS by attempting to expose the Holocaust and informing the Catholic Church is portrayed in the narrative film Amen, released in 2002, starring Ulrich Tukur as Gerstein and directed by Costa-Gavras. Amen was largely adapted from Rolf Hochhuth's play.

William T. Vollmann's Europe Central, the National Book Award fiction winner for 2005, has a 55-page segment, Clean Hands, which relates Gerstein's story.

Thomas Keneally, the author of Schindler's Ark (on which the film Schindler's List is based), wrote a dramatic play, Either Or, on the subject of Gerstein's life as an SS officer and how he dealt with the concentration camps. It premiered at the Theater J in Washington, DC, in May 2007.

In 2010, a group of film students from Emory University produced a short film, The Gerstein Report, which chronicled the events leading up to Gerstein's death. The film won Best Drama at the 2010 Campus MovieFest International Grande Finale in Las Vegas, Nevada.

The Swedish musician Stefan Andersson wrote the song "Flygblad över Berlin" ("Flyers over Berlin") on his 2018 album of the same name, about Gerstein and his meeting with the Swedish diplomat.

He is depicted in the 2026 movie The Swedish Connection, played by Simon Mantei. Gerstein's meeting with von Otter is depicted as happening by chance on a train between Warsaw and Berlin.

== Bibliography ==
- Adam, Uwe Dietrich (1985). "Les chambres à gaz" [The Gas Chambers]. In Colloque de l'École des hautes études en science sociale (ed.). L'Allemagne nazie et le génocide juif [Nazi Germany and the Jewish Genocide] (in French). Paris: Gallimard–Le Seuil. ISBN 978-2020089852.
- Friedländer, Saul (1967). Kurt Gerstein ou l'ambiguïté du Bien [Kurt Gerstein, or the Ambiguity of Good] (in French). Tournai: Casterman.
- Friedländer, Saul (1969). Kurt Gerstein: The Ambiguity of Good. New York: Alfred A. Knopf.
- Friedländer, Saul (2008). L'Allemagne nazie et les Juifs, 1939-1945 (in French). Vol. 2, Les années d'extermination. Paris: Seuil.
- Hilberg, Raul (2006). La destruction des Juifs d'Europe [The Destruction of the European Jews]. Folio Histoire (in French). Vol. 3. Paris: Gallimard.
- Joffroy, Pierre (2002) [1969]. L'espion de Dieu – La passion de Kurt Gerstein [God’s Spy – The Passion of Kurt Gerstein] (in French). Paris: Robert Laffont. p. 453.
- Poliakov, Léon (1974) [1951]. Le Bréviaire de la Haine [The Breviary of Hate] (in French). Paris: Calmann-Lévy.
- Vidal-Naquet, Pierre (1987). Les assassins de la mémoire – Un Eichmann de papier et autres essais sur le révisionnisme [Assassins of Memory – A Paper Eichmann and Other Essays on Revisionism] (in French). Paris: La Découverte.
- Schäfer, Jürgen (2002). Kurt Gerstein – Zeuge des Holocaust. Ein Leben zwischen Bibelkreisen und SS [Kurt Gerstein – Witness to the Holocaust: A Life Between Bible Circles and the SS]. Contributions to Westphalian Church History (in German). Vol. 16 (3rd ed.). Bielefeld: Luther-Verlag. p. 259.
- Hey, Bernd; Rickling, Matthias; Stockhecke, Kerstin (2003). Kurt Gerstein (1905–1945) – Widerstand in SS-Uniform [Kurt Gerstein (1905–1945) – Resistance in SS Uniform] (in German) (2nd ed.). Bielefeld: Verlag für Regionalgeschichte. p. 75.
- Le Ninèze, Alain (2017). L'Énigme Gerstein [The Gerstein Enigma] (in French). Paris: Ateliers Henry Dougier.

=== Works inspired by the life of Kurt Gerstein ===
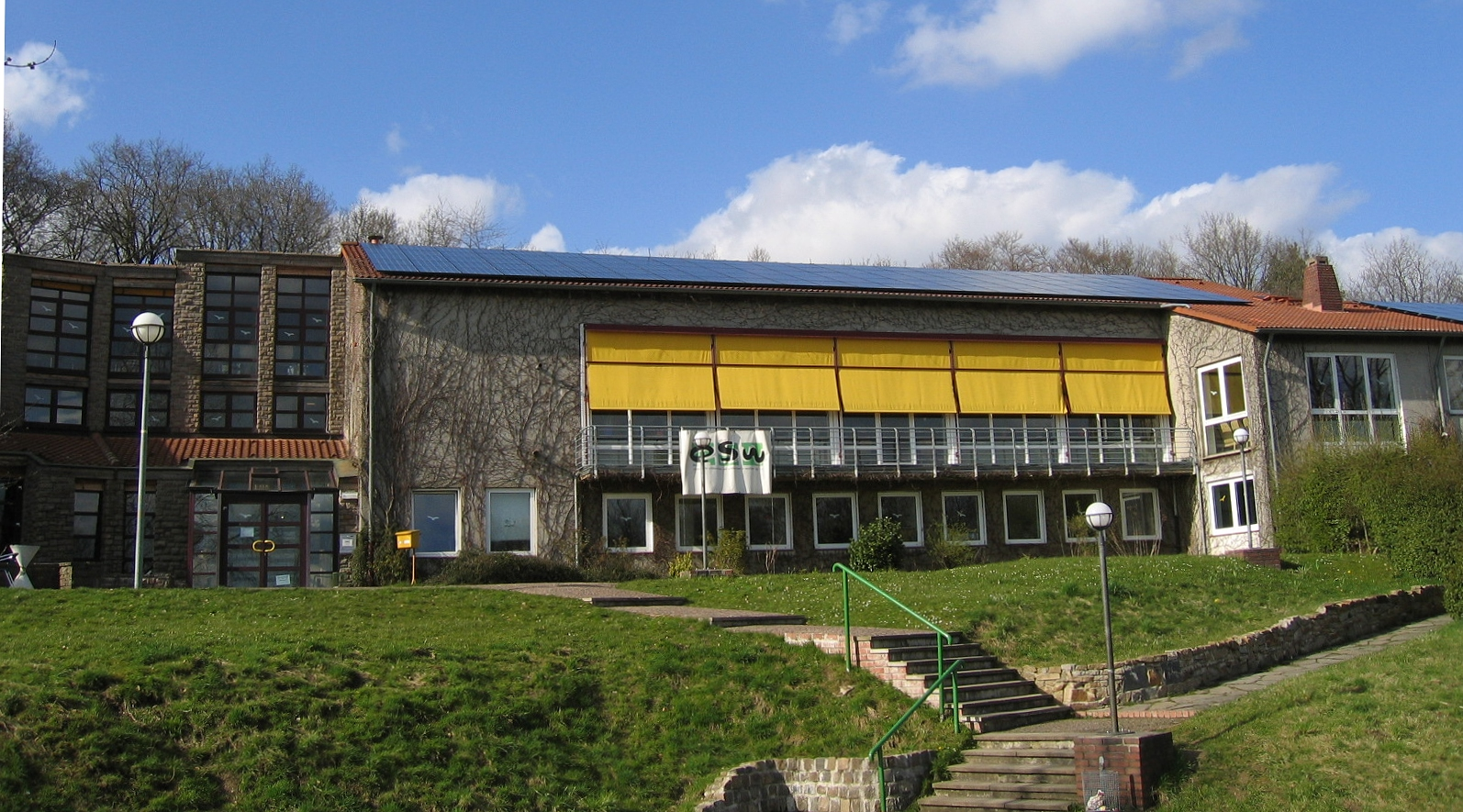
The “Kurt Gerstein House” (museum and archives) near Hagen

- Gatti, Armand (1962). Chroniques d'une planète provisoire [Chronicles of a Provisional Planet] (in French). Éditions du Seuil. p. 318.
- Hochhuth, Rolf (1963). Le Vicaire [The Deputy] (in French). Éditions du Seuil.
- Costa-Gavras (2002). Amen (Motion picture) (in French).
