= Marlies Teichmüller =

German geologist (1914–2000)

Marlies Teichmüller (born Marie-Luise Barbara Köster; 1914 – 12 September 2000) was a German geologist and coal petrologist. She specialised in the study of coal formation through petrologic analysis. In 1953, she became a founding member of the International Committee for Coal Petrology (ICCP), an organization responsible for the standardization of coal nomenclature and analytical techniques.

Teichmüller was born in Herne, Westphalia, and she studied natural sciences. She went to Humboldt University in Berlin, majoring in geology in 1937, after which she went to the United States and worked with Reinhardt Thiessen at the U.S. Bureau of Mines in Pittsburgh. In 1937, she met geologist Rolf Teichmüller and married him. Thiessen died from a heart attack and she continued to examine the main question on the nature of coal under Thiessen's successor George C. Sprunk. Her doctoral thesis of 1941 under Eric Stach at Berlin was on using transmitted and reflected light for microscope studies of coal. She also studied with Walther Gothan (1879–1954). Marlies visited the US in 1963 and 1967, visiting the Everglades and other coal-forming environments that were being studied by Professor William Spackman. She concluded that it was similar to the Köln Miocene brown-coal deposits. She pioneered fluorescence microscopy in coal studies and discovered the minerals fluorinite and exudatinite. Along with her husband she examined the application of reflectance to study the extent of coal formation.
