= Wilhelm Pfannenstiel =

German physician and SS-Standartenführer (1890–1982)

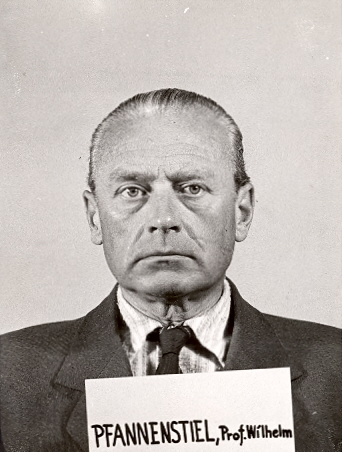
- SS-Standartenführer Wilhelm Pfannenstiel in postwar custody
- Born: 12 February 1890; Breslau, German Empire
- Died: 1 November 1982 (aged 92); Marburg, Hesse, West Germany
- Military career
- Allegiance: Nazi Germany
- Branch: Schutzstaffel
- Service years: until 1945
- Rank: SS-Standartenführer
- Unit: Totenkopfverbände

Wilhelm Hermann Pfannenstiel (12 February 1890 – 1 November 1982) was a German physician, member of the Nazi Party from 1933, (NSDAP 2828629), and SS officer from 1934, (SS-Standartenführer, SS-No. 273083). In August 1942 he witnessed, together with Kurt Gerstein, the gassing of Jews in Bełżec extermination camp. He may also share responsibility with other SS officials in criminal medical experimentations on unwilling and uninformed human beings, mainly Jews prisoners in Dachau concentration camp.

== Life ==
Wilhelm Pfannenstiel was born in Breslau, Lower Silesia, the current city of Wrocław in western Poland. He was the son of the gynecologist Hermann Johannes Pfannenstiel and Elisabeth Behlendorff, who married in 1889. Pfannenstiel studied medicine at the Universities of Oxford, Heidelberg and Munich. He joined the Nazi party in 1933 after Adolf Hitler succeeded in being appointed Chancellor of the Reich.

On 11 November 1933 Pfannenstiel signed the commitment of the professors at German universities and colleges to Hitler and the National Socialist state. Also in 1933, he founded a chapter of the "German Society for Racial Hygiene" in Marburg. In 1934, he joined the SS. Pfannenstiel had five children. One of them was the later professor of medicine and thyroid expert Peter Pfannenstiel (de).

== Nazi career ==
Pfannenstiel was a member of the NS Teacher's Association, the NS Medical Association and the NS Culture Bund. He worked in the Racial policy Office and Deputy Head of training for the Race and Resettlement main Office of the SS. As a Professor of Hygiene at the University of Marburg in Marburg, he headed the Marburg Deutsche Gesellschaft für Rassenhygiene (German Society for Race Hygiene). In 1935 he nominated Paul Uhlenhuth for the Nobel Prize in Medicine for his work in chemotherapy. In 1937, he became lecturer in aviation medicine and SS-doctor of the upper section of Fulda-Werra. In 1939, he became Advisory hygienist at the SS Fü.

Following the invasion of Poland at the onset of World War II he was in Marburg on leave in 1940 and used as a Hygiene Inspector in Berlin, where his duties included also the inspection of concentration camps in the newly formed General Government. In the years 1942 and 1943, he attended the extermination camps of Operation Reinhard including Belzec, where he personally witnessed the undressing of women and the gassing of Hungarian Jews in August 1942.

== Belzec camp ==
Pfannenstiel was with Kurt Gerstein in Belzec concentration camp in August 1942 during which he witnessed the botched gassing of Jews from Lwów, an episode which Gerstein included in the subsequently named Gerstein Report and which is partly corroborated in the report of Wehrmacht NCO Wilhelm Cornides. After 1941, Pfannenstiel held the rank of SS-Obersturmbannführer. He was promoted to SS-Standartenführer in 1944.

Pfannenstiel's independent testimony of what he witnessed differed in some respects from Gerstein's but still added a degree of veracity in that they were both there that day, and did witness the gassing. The deposition of Wilhelm Pfannenstiel before the Darmstadt Court on 6 June 1950 reads:

While the Jews were being taken in, the rooms were lit up with electric light and everything passed off peacefully. But when the lights were turned off, loud cries burst out inside, which then gradually died away. As soon as everything was quiet again, the doors in the outside walls were opened, the corpses were brought out, and, after being searched for gold teeth, they were stacked in a trench. — Wilhelm Pfannenstiel

Pfannenstiel may have also been complicit in the commission of medical experiments. SS-Hauptsturmfuehrer (captain) Sigmund Rascher, a doctor who committed war crimes at Dachau, wrote to him about previous correspondence they had concerning using prisoners as human guinea pigs. The letter was introduced as evidence at the Doctor’s Trial at Nuremberg.

Highly esteemed Professor please I dare to ask if whether you are still interested that we carry out the experiments on human beings on the fostering of altitude resistance by administering vitamins. If so, I would devotedly request you to apply to the Reich Research Council and Chief of the business managing board Standartenführer SS Wolfram Sievers .... so that a mobile low pressure chamber may be obtained through the Luftwaffe for your and my joint experiments... — Sigmund Rascher.

== Postwar activities ==
After the war he was interned by the Americans until 1950. Between 1954 and 1959 he directed the vaccines division of the German pharmaceutical company Schaper & Brümmer GmbH & Co. He was a member of the German Association for Focal Infection Research.

== Publications ==
- Contributions to the histological findings in Skleralnarben after glaucoma surgery with regard to their filtration ability, Munich 1914 (thesis)
- The animal experimental bases for the treatment of typhus and paratyphoid germs from separators, Jena, 1931
- Effects of different vitamin intake on health status. Elwert'sche Verlagsbuchhandlung, Marburg 1932
- Animal studies on mineral water effects on the blood, State mineral, Berlin 1933
- Demographic development and eugenics in the National Socialist state. In: past and present 24, 1934, pp. 95–109
- Recent results of biological effects of mineral spring water bottlers, Berlin 1937
- Modern war as tutor of hygiene, stalling, Oldenburg 1944
- The healing value of West German natural healing waters, Cologne 1960.

== Literature ==
- Werner E. Gerabek: Pfannenstiel, Wilhelm. In: new Deutsche Biographie (NDB). Volume 20, Duncker & Humblot, Berlin 2001, S. 298 f. (Digitalisat).
- Ernst Klee: the person lexicon to the Third Reich, Frankfurt am Main 2003, ISBN 3-10-039309-0.
