= Max Pfannenstiel =

German geologist, palaeontologist and librarian (1902–1976)

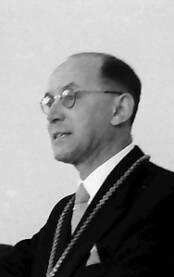
Image of Prof. Pfannenstiel

Max Joseph Jakob Pfannenstiel (25 July 1902 – 1 January 1976) was a German geologist, palaeontologist and librarian who spent some years in Turkey due to being classified as a 2nd-degree mixed-Jew during the early part of the Nazi regime.

Pfannenstiel was born in Wanzenau, Alsace, to notary Hermann and Maria Reinach Pfannenstiel. The family moved to Mainz where Pfannenstiel studied at the gymnasium graduating in 1921 before studying geology at the University of Heidelberg under Wilhelm Salomon-Calvi and at the University of Breslau under Hans Cloos. He received a doctorate in 1926 from Heidelberg and worked as an assistant to Wilhelm Deecke at the University of Freiburg until 1930. During this period he produce a catalog of fossil from the Upper Rhine. He also examined the geology of the Kaiserstuhl area. He then trained as a librarian and joined work in 1932 but he was dismissed in 1933 due to the Nuremberg Laws which identified him as "Mischlinge 2nd degree" or 2nd degree Jewish mixed race. He then worked in a bookstore and in 1935 he went to Geneva as a Rockefeller scholar at the library of the Hygienics Institute of the League of Nations. In 1938 his former advisor Salomon-Calvi, who had been exiled as a Jew to Turkey found a position for Pfannestiel in Ankara and worked at the library of the Ankara Agricultural University until 1941. In 1941 he returned to Germany where he joined military service (the rules about Jewish ancestry were changed in 1942) where his expertise on the Mediterranean was sought. Geologist Julius Wilser questioned his appointment for being a "half-Jew" but an examination of the laws applicable showed that he could be employed and his old position as librarian at the University of Erlangen was restored. He then joined the army and was involved in cartography and bathymetry of the Mediterranean in the Palestine and adjoining regions with the military geology department at Berlin-Wannsee. Here he was also able to examine his personal interests on the Quaternary geology of the Levant. He examined sea level variations related to the Ice Age and was able to later suggest estimates of the extent of the Glacial cover in Europe. He returned to work at the end of the war at the University of Freiburg and in 1947 he became a professor of geology succeeding Wolfgang Soergel. He became a rector of the university in 1954-55. He retired in 1970 but continued to serve as an emeritus professor. In this period he began to construct a geological archive based on manuscripts from wartime. He received the Hans Stille Medal in 1974 and was appointed officer of the Order of the Palms of the Paris Academy of Sciences (1966).

Pfannenstiel married Christine Hormuth in 1933 and they had two daughters.
