= Roland Benz =

German biophysicist (born 1943)

Roland Benz (born 1943 in Singen, Baden-Württemberg; died 2025 in Würzburg) was a German biophysicist.

== Early life and education ==
Benz studied mathematics, chemistry, and physics at the University of Würzburg. In 1972, he obtained his Ph.D. in biology, with Peter Läuger at University of Konstanz as his supervisor; and, in 1977, he obtained his Habilitation in Biophysics.

== Career ==
A Heisenberg Fellow of the Deutsche Forschungsgemeinschaft (DFG) (German Science Foundation), Benz was a visiting professor at State University of New York at Stony Brook (SUNYSB) in 1980 and 1982. In 1984, he was a visiting professor at University of British Columbia in Vancouver.

In 1986, Benz became a full professor of biotechnology at the University of Würzburg, his alma mater.

Since 2003, Benz has been a Member of the European Graduate College; and, since 2005, a Member in the French–German Graduate College, both sponsored by the DFG.

Since 2009, Benz held the Wisdom Professorship at the Jacobs University Bremen and has been a research fellow at the Rudolf Virchow Center and the DFG Research Center for Experimental Biomedicine.

=== Research interests ===
Benz's research interests included the periplasmic structure and organization of cell membranes and other biological membranes; biophysical processes and the molecular basis of membrane proteins in microorganisms and higher organisms; and, pore-forming peptides and proteins.

Benz was the leader of several research projects, including:

- the molecular basis of signal transduction and membrane transport (SFB 176; 1987–1999);
- ecology, physiology, and biochemistry of plants under stress (SFB 251; 1989–1992);
- nuclear magnetic resonance in vivo and in vitro for the study of biomedical basic elements (Member in the DFG-Graduate College; 1992–1999); and,
- the regulatory membrane proteins: from the mechanism of recognition to the pharmacological structure (SFB 487; seit 2000).

=== Awards ===
In 2002, Benz was recognised with the Gay-Lussac/Humboldt Award de la Ministère de recherche français for his role in the development of a Franco–German collaboration.

In 2007, he was awarded an honorary doctorate by the University of Barcelona.

In 2011, he was honoured, with another honorary doctorate, by the Umeå University's Faculty of Medicine

=== Publications ===
- Benz R. (1980.) Künstliche Lipidmembranen. Modelle für biologische Membranen, Universitätsverlag Konstanz, ISBN 3-87940-142-X
- Benz R. (2004.) Bacterial and Eukaryotic Porins. Structure, Function, Mechanism, Wiley-VCH, ISBN 3-527-30775-3
