= Misty C. Bentz =

American astrophysicist

Misty C. Bentz (born July 4, 1980) is an American astrophysicist and Professor of Physics and Astronomy at Georgia State University. She is best known for her work on supermassive black hole mass measurements and black hole scaling relationships.

== Career ==
Bentz studied physics and astronomy at the University of Washington and received her PhD in Astronomy at The Ohio State University in 2007. Bentz was a postdoctoral researcher (2007–2009) and a NASA Hubble Fellow (2009–2010) at the University of California, Irvine. In 2010, she joined the faculty of the Department of Physics and Astronomy at Georgia State University.

== Work ==
Bentz is known for her work using reverberation mapping to determine the masses of supermassive black holes in the center of active galaxies. She currently maintains The AGN Black Hole Mass Database which gives SMBH mass measurements for over 60 active galaxies. Using these SMBH mass measurements, Bentz has also contributed to calibration of several black hole scaling relationships. These relationships include black hole mass to galaxy stellar mass and broad-line region radius to AGN luminosity. The calibration of these relationships allows black hole mass estimates to be compiled for large statistical samples, and they provide observational constraints for large high-resolution hydrodynamical cosmological simulations meant to probe galaxy formation and evolution over cosmic time, e.g. the Illustris and Horizon-AGN simulations.

In 2013, She was selected as one of twenty-two astronomers to chart the road map of NASA astrophysics for the next thirty years. Bentz also was the technical editor of the 4th edition of Astronomy for Dummies. She has been quoted in outlets like Popular Science, Business Insider, Live Science, and Mashable, regarding black holes.
