= Ernst Anton Wülfing =

Ernst Anton Wülfing (27 November 1860, Elberfeld – 17 December 1930, Bad Wörishofen) was a German mineralogist and petrographer, known for his research on the optical properties of minerals and meteorites.

He studied chemistry at Geneva and at Heidelberg as a student of Robert Bunsen, then focused his attention to mineralogy and geology, of which, he studied at Greifswald and Vienna (1887–88). Afterwards he served as an assistant to Harry Rosenbusch at the University of Heidelberg.

He taught classes in mineralogy and petrography at the University of Tübingen (1891–1899), the agricultural academy at Hohenheim in Württemberg (1899–1904), the Technische Hochschule in Danzig (1904–07), the University of Kiel (1907–08) and at the University of Heidelberg (1908–1926).

The mineral wülfingite is named in his honor.

== Published works ==
- Beitrag zur Kenntniss des Kryokonit, 1890.
- Tabellarische Uebersicht der einfachen Formen der 32 krystallographischen Symmetriegruppen zusammengestellt und gezeichnet, 1895.
- Die Meteoriten in sammlungen und ihre Literatur, nebst versuch den tauschwert der Meteoriten zu bestimmen, 1897.
- Die 32 kristallographischen symmetrieklassen und ihre einfachen formen, 1914.
- Ein neues Polarisationsmikroskop und kritische Betrachtungen über bisherige Konstruktionen, 1918.
- Mikroskopische Physiographie der Mineralien und Gestine, (original author, Harry Rosenbusch), 5th edition, 1921.
