= Henning Illies =

German geologist

- Born: 14 March 1924; Hamburg, Germany
- Died: 2 August 1982 (aged 58); Germany
- Citizenship: Germany, West Germany
- Education: University of Hamburg
- Known for: Taphrogenesis, Chilean geology
- Awards: Hans-Stille-Medaille (1981)
- Scientific career
- Fields: Geology
- Workplaces: Austral University of Chile

Jürgen Henning Illies (14 March 1924 – 2 August 1982) was a German geologist, an expert in taphrogenesis (rift formation). Apart from his work on rifts, including the Rhine Rift Valley, he is known for his contributions to Chilean geology.

Illies was active at the Austral University of Chile in Valdivia where he mapped the geology of the Old Valdivia Province in 1956–1957. After the mapping was done he studied more specific geologic problems in Chile the years of 1958–59. Illies is currently regarded as a "founding father" of the geology department of the Austral University of Chile.

From 1973 onwards he was a member of the German Academy of Sciences Leopoldina.

== Notable publications ==
- 1960. Geologie der Gegend von Valdivia/Chile. Neues Jahrbuch fur Geologie u. Palaontlogie, Abhandlungen Bd. 111, S. 30–110. Stuttgart.
- 1981. Mechanism of graben formation. Tectonophysics, 73(1), 249–266.
