= Alfred Bentz =

German geologist and paleontologist

Alfred Theodor Bentz (26 July 1897, Heidenheim, Germany – 11 June 1964) was a German geologist and paleontologist who worked at the Preußischen Geologischen Bundesanstalt and served as an authority on the management of oil and gas reserves in Germany during the Third Reich. Although he reported directly to Hermann Göring, he was not a member of the Nazi party and was reinstated after the war, continuing to direct geology research in the postwar years.

Bentz was born in Heidenheim in the eastern Swabian Alb to confectioner Karl Alfos and Pauline Adelheid Keller. Following early education, and a couple of years in military service he studied at the Ludwig-Maximilians-Universität München followed by a doctorate from the University of Tübingen under Edwin Hennig. His thesis was on the stratigraphy of the Middle Jurassic and the tectonics at the western rim of the Nördlingen Ries. At that time the impact theory for dinosaur extinction had not been proposed, and he was skeptical of the idea after it was proposed. During the 1923 depression, Bentz became a probationary geologist at the Prussian State Geological Institute in Berlin. In 1926, he worked under Jacob Stoller and was involved in mapping Emsland. In 1929, he succeeded Stoller as chief consultant for petroleum. He was involved in the use of tectonic and paleontological approaches to stratigraphy for identifying potential locations for drilling. Bentz was placed under Hermann Göring on 28 July 1938 and tasked with searching for oil wells and given a free hand. He was involved in exploring oil in Austria and the Soviet frontiers. With the bombing of Berlin in 1945, Bentz moved to Vienna. After the war he was approached by Major Albert Everard Gunther who sought to manage oil reserves for the British occupied zone. After the war Victor Moritz Goldschmidt who had moved to Oslo made a letter of declaration that Bentz had never been a Nazi party member and that he had been an independent thinker. He also obtained letters from a Chinese student from Freiberg who noted that Bentz had never been in uniform (although this has been disputed) and had never greeted anyone with "Heil Hitler". Bentz had also obtained pardon from the Gestapo who had arrested a drilling specialist Werner Müller and sentenced to death. Bentz headed geology research in Lower Saxony for a few years after the war and was involved in search for oil fields in the North Sea.

Bentz married Agnes Musper in 1922, and they had a daughter Karin and a son Hans Dieter. Dieter was killed in the bombing of Berlin. He died from a heart attack in Stratford-upon-Avon while on a visit in the UK to attend a meeting of the Permanent Council of the World Petroleum Congress.
