= Linc Energy =

Australian energy company

Linc Energy Ltd.
- Type: Publicly listed company
- Traded as: ASX: LNC
- Industry: Oil and gas Coal
- Founded: October 29, 1996
- Headquarters: Brisbane, Queensland, Australia
- Key people: Peter Bond (Executive Chairman); Craig Ricato (CEO)
- Products: synthetic gas synthetic fuel electric power
- Revenue: ▲A$124,370,000 A$124,370,000 (2013)
- Net income: ▲A$64,989,000(2013)
- Total assets: ▲A$1,068,491 (2013)
- Total equity: ▲A$444,847,000 (2013)
- Owner: Peter Bond (Newtron Pty Limited); Genting Strategic Investments (Singapore) Pte Ltd minor shareholders
- Number of employees: 360
- Subsidiaries: SPC Yerostigaz; SAPEX Limited; New Emerald Coal
- Website: lincenergy.com

Linc Energy was an Australian energy company that specialised in coal-based synthetic fuel production, as well as conventional oil and gas production. It was engaged in development and commercialisation of proprietary underground coal gasification technology. Produced gas was used for production of synthetic fuel through gas-to-liquid technology, and was also used for power generation. The company had its headquarters in Brisbane, Queensland.

In April 2016 the company was placed into voluntary administration. At the second creditors meeting in May 2016 the unanimous vote was for the company to be liquidated.

== History ==
Linc Energy was incorporated on 29 October 1996 as Linc Energy N.L. On 17 November 2000, it changed its name to Linc Energy Ltd. It listed on the Australian Securities Exchange (ASX) on 10 May 2006 and on the OTCQX in New York in December 2007. On 19 December 2013, Linc Energy delisted from the ASX and listed on the Mainboard of the Singapore Exchange.

Linc started its Chinchilla Demonstration Facility in July 1999. First gas was produced in that very same year. Initially Linc Energy used the underground coal gasification technology worked out by Ergo Exergy Technologies, Inc, of Canada. However, in 2006 the cooperation with Ergo Exergy was terminated and the cooperation agreement for technology usage, consultation and engineering services was signed with the Skochinsky Institute of Mining and the Scientific-Technical Mining Association of Russia.

In 2005, Linc signed a memorandum with Syntroleum granting a licence to use the Syntroleum's proprietary gas-to-liquid technology and started to build a GTL pilot plant in November 2007 at the Chinchilla facility. The plant was commissioned in August 2008. The first synthetic crude was produced in October 2008.

In November 2007, Linc Energy, in cooperation with BioCleanCoal Pty Ltd, established a joint venture to develop a prototype bioreactor for converting carbon dioxide through a photosynthesis into oxygen and solid biomass.

On 20 December 2007, Linc Energy acquired a 60% stake and later increased it to 91.6% in Uzbekistan's underground coal gasification company SPC Yerostigaz. On 15 October 2008, a South Australian oil and gas company SAPEX Limited was merged with Linc Energy. This acquisition provided Linc Energy with tenements in the Arckaringa, St Vincent and Walloway basins.

In 2009, Linc Energy purchased from GasTech IncNorth American coal tenements in Montana (Powder River Basin), Wyoming, and North Dakota. In 2010, Linc Energy acquired tenements in the Cook Inlet Basin in Alaska from GeoPetro Alaska. At the same year, it sold non-core Emerald, Galilee and Pentland coal mining tenements in Queensland to Adani Mining Pty Ltd, a subsidiary of Adani Group.

In October 2010, Linc Energy acquires 10% stake in the UK-based alkaline fuel cell company AFC Energy and in 2011, it increased its stake up to 12%. In the cooperation with AFC Energy and B9 Coal, the company commissioned a hydrogen fuel cell named Alfa System at Chinchilla. Combining the fuel cell technology with the underground coal gasification allows usage of hydrogen, produced by the underground coal gasification process, as a feedstock for the fuel cell.

In 2011, it acquired three producing oil fields from Rancher Energy, 14 oil fields from ERG Resources, and purchased Renaissance LLC to take control in the Umiat oil field. In April 2012, Linc Energy partnered with a subsidiary of Hong Kong listed Golden Concord Holdings (GCL) to commercialise fuel using its UGC to GTC technology in China. Golden Concord purchased a 5% stake in the company for 120 million Australian dollars (US$124 million).

On 23 January 2013, Linc Energy announced the discovery of tight oil resource surrounding Coober Pedy estimated at between 3.5 and 223 billion barrels (560×10^{6} and 35,450×10^{6} m^{3}) of oil. At the same year, their subsidiary New Emerald Coal bought the Blair Athol coal mine.

In July 2014, the company announced that it had gained initial approval from the Ministry of Environment of Poland to commence an underground coal gasification project and that the company has been awarded its third coal exploration license in Poland. Also in July 2014, Linc Energy announced plans to commence drilling wells to prove up deeper parts of the Arckaringa Basin.

=== Voluntary Administration ===
On 16 April 2016, after the coal price fell from a high of US$130 to $US55 per tonne, the company was placed into voluntary administration. PPB Advisory were appointed as the administrator. On 13 May 2016 the administrators announced that in their opinion the company should be liquidated, but found Linc Energy were solvent prior to the appointment of administrators and they could not identify any potential offences or liquidation recoveries. At the second creditors meeting on 23 May 2016 the unanimous vote was for the company to be liquidated. The administrator's report found the rapid deterioration of global commodity prices impacted on Linc Energy's financial position.

== Operations ==
Linc Energy had business interests in Australia, North America, the United Kingdom, Poland, South Africa, China, Vietnam and Uzbekistan. In addition to the underground coal gasification, the company was active in traditional coal mining and oil and gas exploration and production.

The company owned and operated the Chinchilla Demonstration Facility 300 kilometres (190 mi) west of Brisbane, which was the world's first gas-to-liquid plant operating on synthesis gas produced by underground coal gasification. The facility hosted five underground coal gas generators, a GTL pilot plant, a laboratory, and a wastewater treatment plant.

Linc Energy also planned to build a 20,000 barrels per day (3,200 m^{3}/d) gas-to-liquid plant on the Arckaringa Basin in South Australia. The plant was to be designed by Aker Solutions and it was to be fed by synthesis gas produced by underground coal gasification. BP had an option to buy 70% of the produced diesel fuel.

In the Yining mining area in China, Linc Energy planned to develop a coal gasification project in cooperation with Xinwen Mining Group. Together with Vinacomin, Song Hong Energy and Marubeni, Linc prepared the Red River Delta UCG (UCG Tonkin) project in Hung Yen, Vietnam.

Linc Energy cooperated with UK Coal in the UK and Exxaro in South Africa. It had a coal exploration lease in the Upper Silesia Coal Basin, Poland. In December 2012, it started cooperation with Ukrainian energy company DTEK to evaluate potential of the underground coal gasification on the DTEK's local coal resources.

Linc Energy had a subsidiary in Angren, Uzbekistan called Yerostigaz. Yerostigaz was established in 1961 and operated in the field of underground coal gasification. It produced about one million cubic meters of syngas per day. The produced syngas was used as fuel in the Angren Power Station.

== Controversy ==
In Australia in 2014 the Queensland Government filed charges over alleged environmental harm stemming from its Chinchilla Facility. Linc Energy reported that these charges were not material to the company's finances or operations and that it would staunchly defend allegations.

In 2021 all charges against former Linc Energy executives were dropped by the Director of Public Prosecutions when Crown Prosecutor Ralph Devlin QC told the court that "the prosecution was no longer satisfied it could prove serious environmental harm". Former executive Peter Bond labelled the case a "witch hunt" and accused the Queensland Government of wasting $50M of public money on pursuing the case.

== See also ==
- Carbon Energy
- Cougar Energy
- Non-renewable resource
