= Hi-Gen Power =

London-based developer of energy projects

- Industry: Alternative energy
- Founded: 2009
- Headquarters: London, United kingdom
- Key people: Alisa Murphy (Director)
- Services: Fuel cell projects development
- Website: www.hi-genpower.com

Hi-Gen Power (former name: B9 Coal) was a London-based developer of projects combining underground coal gasification with carbon capture and storage and alkaline fuel cells. It was established in 2009 to commercialize alkaline fuel cells developed by the fuel cell manufacturer AFC Energy. It is affiliated with B9 Gas.

In 2010, B9 Coal in cooperation with AFC Energy and underground coal gasification developer Linc Energy commissioned a hydrogen fuel cell named Alfa System at the Chinchilla underground coal gasification facility. Combining these technologies allows usage of hydrogen, produced by the underground coal gasification process, as a feedstock for the fuel cell. In August 2010, B9 Coal proposed usage of combined underground coal gasification and alkaline fuel cells technologies at the Rio Tinto Alcan Lynemouth power station in Northumberland. In October 2010, AFC Energy, Powerfuel Power, and B9 Coal agreed to integrate AFC Energy's fuel cell technology with the integrated gasification combined cycle technology at the planned Hatfield power station at the Hatfield Colliery near Doncaster.
