= Vinacomin =

- Company type: State-owned enterprise
- Industry: coal mining, aluminum mining, manufacturing, tourism industry, finance services, power generation
- Founded: 1995; 31 years ago
- Headquarters: Hanoi, Vietnam

Vinacomin (Vietnam National Coal and Mineral Industries Group, Vietnamese: Tập đoàn công nghiệp Than và Khoáng sản Việt Nam (TKV)) is a Vietnamese mining company. The industrial conglomerate focuses on coal and mineral mining and has headquarters in Hạ Long, Quảng Ninh Province.

== History ==
Vinacomin was created by the merger of the Vietnam Coal Corporation (Vinacoal) and Vietnam Minerals Corporation. Vinacoal was established in 1995 through the merger of all Vietnam's coal exploitation and processing companies.

== Operations ==
Vinacomin operates within many different sectors, such as coal exploitation, processing and selling, explosive and cement production, shipbuilding, automobile manufacturing, tourism, hotels, financing, services and power generation in thermal power plants, including the Cao Ngan thermal power station (the main contractor being China's Harbin) and Na Duong thermal power station (the main contractor being Japan's Marubeni).

Vinacomin currently has five open-pit mines with a capacity of more than 2 million tonnes, including Cao Son, Deo Nai, Coc 6, Ha Tu and Nui Beo. It also has 15 other open-pit mines with a processing capacity of 100,000 tonnes to 1 million tonnes per year.

Vinacomin plans in cooperation with Marubeni and Linc Energy of Australia to exploit bituminous coal reserves in the Song Hong Delta using underground coal gasification technology.

Vinacomin conducts mining operations on one of the world's largest bauxite deposits in the Central Highlands region.

== See also ==
- Coal mining
- Energy in Vietnam
- Bauxite mining in Vietnam
