= Fracking in Ukraine =

Fracking in Ukraine has been used since the 1950s. The first fracking operation in Ukraine was conducted in 1954 for the underground coal gasification project. There has been a strong revival of interest in the fracking industry in Ukraine. According to the U.S. Energy Information Administration, Ukraine has third-largest shale gas reserves in Europe at 128 trillion cubic feet (3.6 trillion cubic metres). As of 2011, approximately 22 domestic and foreign-owned companies have been engaged in fracking in Ukraine.

== Obstacles ==
At least two companies have backed out of a deal to extract shale gas in Eastern Ukraine due to the threat of military action in that area. There are also other challenges to hydraulic fracturing in Ukraine, such as a lack of a proper regulatory framework for its development, opposition of major EU partners to hydraulic fracturing which may seek to influence Ukraine (France, for example, has an outright ban). Ukraine's shale gas reserves are also deeper than those in the United States, and thus production is bound to be more expensive, which may make it cost-prohibitive, depending on the prevailing market prices for gas.

== Uncertainty ==
Constitutionally, Ukraine's natural resources belong to the people, with government acting as a trustee. A private investor needs to execute a production-sharing agreement, but is never entitled to 100% of its production, as it has to be shared with the state. The level of potential public opposition to hydraulic fracturing also creates uncertainty. On the positive side, Ukraine continues to vigorously pursue reforms designed to achieve energy independence, which portends well for hydraulic fracturing as a helpful option in that regard.
