= Yankuang Energy Group =

Chinese energy company

Yankuang Energy Group Company Limited
- Native name: 兖矿能源集团股份有限公司
- Type: Public (SEHK: 1171, SSE: 600188)
- Industry: Energy, Mining
- Founded: 1997; 29 years ago
- Headquarters: Zoucheng, Jining, Shandong, China
- Area served: Worldwide
- Key people: Chairman: Li Wei
- Products: Coal, Potash, Methanol, Electricity
- Services: Mining, Logistics, Power Generation
- Number of employees: 77,957
- Parent: Shandong Energy Group
- Website: www.yanzhoucoal.com.cn

Yankuang Energy Group Company Limited (simplified Chinese: 兖矿能源集团股份有限公司; traditional Chinese: 兗礦能源集團股份有限公司), formerly known as Yanzhou Coal Mining Company Limited (兖州煤业股份有限公司; 兗州煤業股份有限公司), is a Chinese energy company engaged in coal and potash mining, chemical production, power generation, and logistics. It is majority-owned by Shandong Energy Group.

== History ==
The company was established in 1997 as Yanzhou Coal Mining Company Limited. In December 2021, it changed its name to Yankuang Energy Group Company Limited to reflect a broader energy portfolio beyond coal.

== Operations ==
Yankuang Energy operates in several sectors:

- Coal mining: Engaged in underground and open-cut mining, preparation, and sale of coal.
- Potash mining: In 2024, the company invested in Highfield Resources to develop the Muga potash project in Spain and acquired the Southey potash project in Canada through its subsidiary Yancoal Canada Resources.
- Chemical production: Produces methanol, ethylene glycol, acetic acid, and other chemical products.
- Power generation: Provides electricity and heat supply services.
- Logistics: Offers railway transportation services.
