= Peter Bond =

Australian businessman

- Born: Camden, New South Wales
- Occupations: Mining and Energy Executive
- Known for: Linc Energy, Dunk Island, Infinite Power
- Title: Chairman of the Board, Infinite Power
- Children: 6
- Website: peterbond.co

Peter Bond is an Australian mining and energy executive, best known as the former Executive Chairman of Linc Energy and creator of the world's first synthetic crude oil. He is now a director of renewable energy company Infinite Power and ranked among the most influential business executives in Australia in Who's Who Business.

== Early life ==
Bond was raised in Camden, New South Wales. His father was a truck driver and his mother was a teacher. He finished high school in 1981 and became a metallurgist with BHP.

== Career ==
After leaving BHP, Bond began buying quarries, and soon started making $17,000 a month trucking coal. He became a millionaire by age 26. Bond debuted on the Australian BRW rich list in 2008 with a net worth of $352,000,000, made it to number 21 on the Sunday Mail Queensland Top 150 Rich List and peaked as the 10th richest business person in Australia, with a net worth of $572,000,000.

As a metallurgist, Bond always had an interest in mining technology and renewable energy, and in 2005 he took over Linc Energy, signing a memorandum with Syntroleum granting a licence to use the company's proprietary gas-to-liquid technology. This technology was used to build a GTL pilot plant in November 2007 at Linc's Chinchilla facility. The plant was commissioned in August 2008. The first synthetic crude oil was produced in October 2008.

In 2012, in a world-first, Bond flew 4,000 km across Australia in a jet powered by the fuel produced at Linc Energy's gas to liquid plant in Chinchilla. The company a signed memorandum of agreement with BP for its jet fuel and was heralding the ability to produce 250,000 litres of jet fuel a year.

The following year Bond signed a deal with Russian Billionaire Roman Abramovich to explore gas to liquid opportunities in Russia, after the two met in a Brisbane restaurant – a meeting which was even covered by major international news outlets, including Fox News.

After Linc Energy entered voluntary administration in 2016, following a court case which was later dropped, Bond put his energy into the restoration of Dunk Island, before starting renewable energy business, Infinite Power.

== Personal life ==
Bond has six children with his ex-wife Louise. He has no relation to Australian business person Alan Bond.

== Television ==
Bond appeared on the Australian version of The Secret Millionaire, a television program in which prominent millionaires go undercover in impoverished communities and give away substantial sums of money to help those in need. Bond’s appearance and $300,000 donation were widely praised as being among the most generous of the series. His experience on The Secret Millionaire led him to strike up a friendship with Russell Crowe and launch a television production company called Rough Diamond. Rough Diamond also included a community foundation which received part of the company's profits. Rough Diamond, under Bond's guidance, was best known for producing the documentary series 'Where it all Began' – a series of "Real life, true stories of "the Aussie battlers" who against all odds came out on top".
