= Alexander Skochinsky =

Russian and Soviet scientist

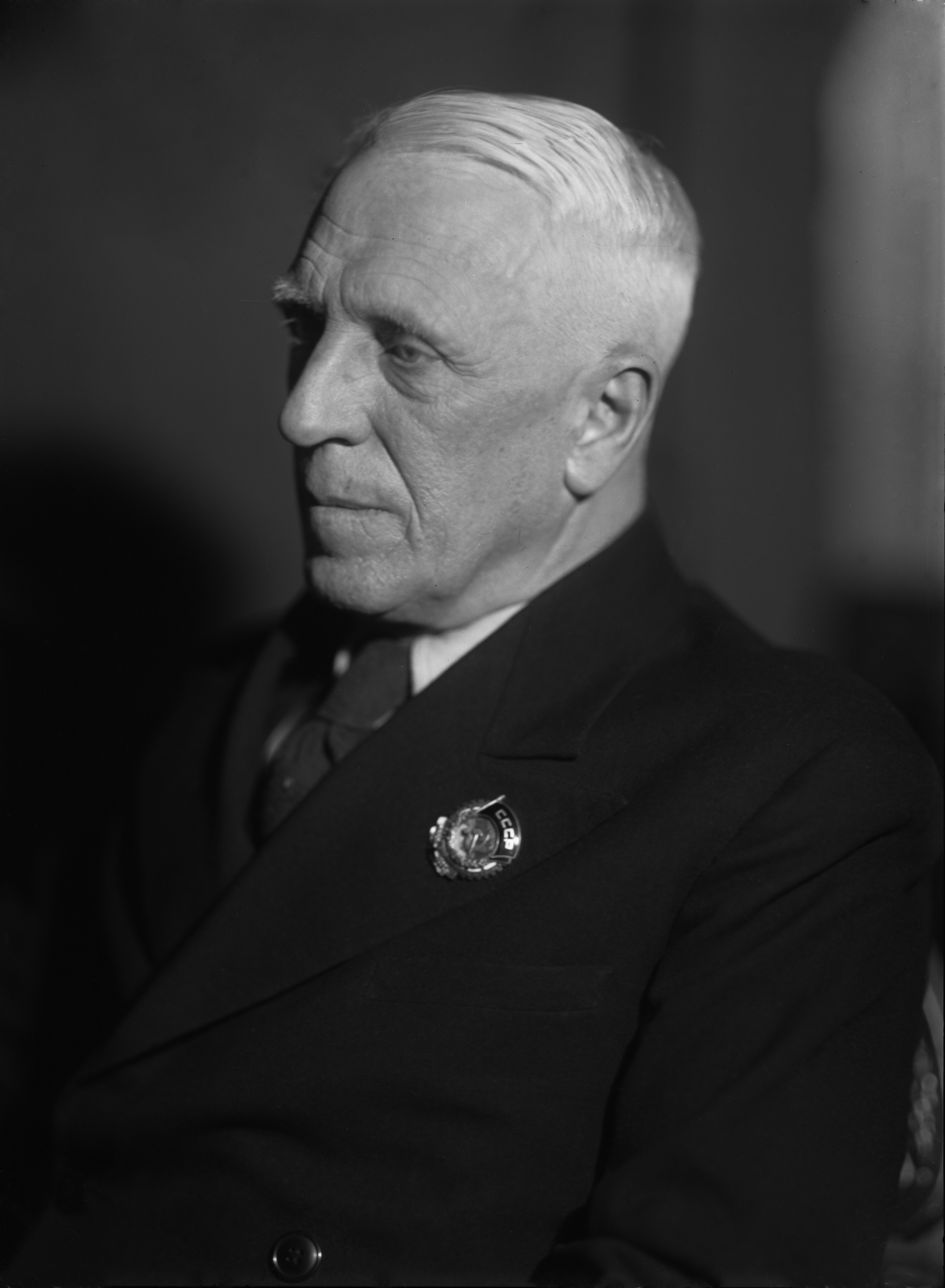
- Born: 13 July [O.S. 1 July] 1874; Olyokma, Yakutsk Oblast, Russian Empire
- Died: 6 October 1960 (aged 86); Moscow, Soviet Union
- Education: Saint Petersburg Mining Institute
- Scientific career
- Fields: Mining

Alexander Alexandrovich Skochinsky (Russian: Александр Александрович Скочинский; 13 July [O.S. 1 July] 1874 — 6 October 1960) was a Russian and Soviet mining scientist, academician of the Academy of Sciences of the Soviet Union (1935), the chairman of the West Siberian Branch of the Academy of Sciences of the Soviet Union (1944–1951).

== Biography ==
Skochinsky was born in Olyokma, Russian Empire.

In 1900, he graduated from the Mining Institute (Saint Petersburg), where he worked as a professor from 1906 to 1930.

From 1930 to 1960, the scientist was a professor at the Moscow Mining Institute.

From 1938 to 1960, he was the director of Institute of Mining of the Academy of Sciences of the USSR and from 1944 to 1951 he was the chairman of the West Siberian Branch of the Academy of Sciences of the Soviet Union.

== Activities ==
The main works of the scientist are related to the problems of mine aerology and safety issues in underground mining.

== Awards and honours ==
Alexander Skochinsky was awarded five Orders of Lenin, two Orders of the Red Banner of Labour and medals. He also became a laureate of the Stalin Prize twice (1950, 1951). In 1954, he was awarded the title of Hero of Socialist Labour.

== See also ==
- Timofey Gorbachyov
