= AFC Energy =

- Type: Public
- Traded as: LSE: AFC
- Industry: Alternative energy
- Founded: 2006
- Defunct: AFC energyJune 2025 AFC
- Headquarters: Cranleigh, Surrey, England
- Number of locations: United Kingdom
- Key people: Gary Bullard (Chairman); John Wilson (CEO)
- Products: Fuel cells
- Revenue: £4 million
- Number of employees: 120+
- Website: www.afcenergy.com

AFC Energy PLC is a developer of hydrogen fuel cell technologies which focus on the displacement of diesel generators in stationary and maritime applications. The technology utilises hydrogen fuel for zero emission electricity generation. The company is based in Cranleigh, Surrey, United Kingdom. It is listed on the London Stock Exchange.

== History ==
The company was established in 2006 by the acquisition of certain intellectual property rights and assets from Eneco. In 2010, it commissioned a hydrogen fuel cell named Alpha System at the Chinchilla underground coal gasification facility, operated by Linc Energy. Combining these technologies allowed usage of hydrogen, produced by the underground coal gasification process, as a feedstock for the fuel cell.

In August 2011, the company commissioned hydrogen fuel cell named Beta System at its facility in the United Kingdom. In October 2011, AFC Energy commissioned two Beta Systems at the AkzoNobel chlor-alkali plant in Bitterfeld, in Germany.

In June 2012, AFC Energy and Industrial Chemicals Limited announced a plan to install the largest fuel cell facility in the United Kingdom with an electrical output of 1 MW. This was subsequently abandoned in 2013 in favour of deploying a large system at an Air Products facility at Stade, Germany.

In March 2015, AFC committed to build a 50 MW fuel cell park in South Korea, as part of a joint venture with two local companies, Samyoung and Changsing Chemical. In April 2015, AFC Energy signed a memorandum of understanding with Dubai Carbon for a 300 MW fuel cell park in Dubai. However, no progress of these projects has been reported.

In August 2015, AFC Energy commenced operation of its first KORE fuel cell system in Stade, Germany. In January 2016, the system reached capacity of 200 kW.

In July 2018, the company agreed to install a 200–400 kW fuel cell unit at the Southern Oil's biorefinery at Gladstone, Australia.

In July 2020, AFC Energy announced a collaboration with Extreme E to use its hydrogen fuel cell technology to enable its race fleet to be charged using zero emission energy. The by-product of utilizing these hydrogen fuel cell power generators for charging, water, will be used elsewhere on-site.

In October 2023, AFC Energy announced that its ammonia cracking technology had achieved 99.99% hydrogen from single reactor testing, with the results independently tested by the UK's NPL and exceeding the standard for fuel cell grade hydrogen.

In November 2024, AFC Energy reported an annual revenue of £4 million, an almost 1000% increase as compared to previously reported revenue of £434,000. The large increase in revenue was driven primarily by AFC Energy's partnership with Speedy Hire.

In June 2025 AFC Energy was reported to have secured a partnership with a global industrial company on the S&P 500 for the development of ammonia crackers. Under the terms of the agreement, development costs incurred by AFC Energy will be reimbursed by the partner with material revenues anticipated for 2027.
