= Timofey Gorbachyov =

Soviet scientist

- Born: 23 June 1900; Troitskoye, Shatsky Uyezd, Tambov Governorate, Russian Empire
- Died: 20 December 1973 (aged 73); Novosibirsk, RSFSR, USSR
- Scientific career
- Fields: Mining

Timofey Fyodorivich Gorbachyov (Russian: Тимофей Борисович Горбачёв; 1900–1973) was a Soviet scientist, specialist in mine construction, technology and equipment of underground coal mining and mine pressure problems.

== Biography ==
Timofey Gorbachev was born in 1900 in the village of Troitskoye of Shatsky Uyezd, Tambov Governorate, Russian Empire.

In 1928, he graduated from the Mining Department of Tomsk Technological Institute.

The scientist worked in the Kuznetsk Basin for more than 20 years, he held various management positions and was also the director of Kemerovo Mining Institute.

From 1954 to 1959, Gorbachev was the chairman of the West Siberian Branch of the USSR Academy of Sciences and from 1958 to 1971, vice-chairman of the Siberian Branch.

In the Institute of Mining SB USSR AS, he was mine pressure work organizator.

From 1954 to 1959, he was a deputy of the Regional Council of People's Deputies. In 1958 Gorbachev became a corresponding Member of the USSR Academy of Sciences.

In 1958–1971, the Member of Presidium.

In 1965–1972, the scientist was the editor-in-chief of the Physical and Technical Problems of Mineral Mining (Физико-технические проблемы разработки полезных ископаемых) magazine.

== Honours and awards ==
Timofey Gorbachev was awarded two Orders of Lenin, Order of the Red Banner, medals, honorary badge Miner's Glory of the I and II degrees, the title of Hero of Socialist Labour (1948). In 1949, he became a laureate of the Stalin Prize for the development and implementation of explosion-proof mine lamps.

== Memory ==
- The commemorative plaque on the wall of the Chinakal Institute of Mining SB RAS in Novosibirsk.

== See also ==
- Alexander Skochinsky
