= Bauxite mining in Vietnam =

Tây Nguyên, Vietnam's Central Highlands

According to the United States Geological Survey, Vietnam is estimated to hold the world's third-largest bauxite ore reserves after Guinea and Australia. The majority of Vietnam's reserves are located in the Central Highlands (Tây Nguyên) and have only been minimally mined. Bauxite is typically strip mined and is used to produce aluminum. According to estimates by Vietnam's Ministry of Industry and Trade, Vietnam's reserves in the Central Highlands amount to 5.4 billion tons. Despite its large reserves, Vietnam produces only 30,000 tons of bauxite per year.

== 21st century plans for bauxite production expansion ==
A draft mining plan for bauxite was approved by the Vietnamese government in 2007. Vinacomin, a Vietnamese mining company, has laid out a plan for 6 bauxite mining projects covering over 1800 square kilometers in Vietnam's mountainous Central Highlands. The first two processing plants for the plan have been contracted to Chalco, a Chinese mining company. The Nhan Co project in Đắk Nông Province and the Tan Rai complex in Lâm Đồng Province are expected to produce 600,000 tons of alumina per year. Vietnam has indicated that it needs about $15.6 billion to invest in major bauxite and alumina refining projects by 2025. Prime Minister Nguyễn Tấn Dũng has approved several large mining projects for the Central Highlands, asserting that bauxite exploitation is "a major policy of the party and the state."

The mining plans have met with strong criticism from scientists, environmentalists and Vietnam's general population. Forests and agricultural land used by coffee and tea farmers are threatened by the plans and opponents have raised concerns about the toxic waste red mud generated through the refinement of bauxite. Vietnamese general Võ Nguyên Giáp has offered strong criticism of the plans, saying that a 1980s study led to experts advising against mining due to severe ecological damage.

In March 2010, Google indicated that malicious software targeting Vietnamese opponents of bauxite mining had infected potentially tens of thousands of users. The malware was used in denial-of-service attacks against dissenting political blogs and installed itself after users downloaded altered Vietnamese language software. The malware was also used to spy on users. The cyber attacks appeared to be a politically motivated attack, according to George Kurtz of McAfee. Vietnamese Foreign Ministry Spokesperson Nguyen Phuong Nga claimed such comments were groundless.

In November 2010, Nguyen Tan Dung, the prime minister of Vietnam, announced that Vietnam's bauxite deposits might total 11,000 Mt; this would be the largest in the world.

== Companies involved ==
- Vinacomin (Vietnam National Coal and Mineral Industries Group)
- United Company RUSAL has struck a deal with a Vietnamese firm to build an alumina refinery using bauxite from a deposit in the Bình Phước Province
- Chalco, (Aluminum Corporation of China Limited)

== See also ==
- List of countries by aluminium production
