= Moreton Resources =

Australian coal mining company

Moreton Resources Limited
- Formerly: Pinnacle Mining; Pinnacle VRB; Cougar Energy
- Type: Publicly listed company
- Traded as: ASX: MRV
- Industry: Coal
- Founded: 1994
- Headquarters: Brisbane, Australia
- Key people: Alexander Jason Elks (CEO and Executive Chairman)
- Products: Coal
- Subsidiaries: MRV Metals; MRV Tarong Basin Coal; MRV Bowen Basin Coal; MRV Surat Basin Coal
- Website: moretonresources.com.au

Moreton Resources Limited (former names: Pinnacle Mining, Pinnacle VRB and Cougar Energy) is an Australian coal mining company. In 2007–2013 it was specialized on underground coal gasification and electric power production by produced syngas. In addition to Australia, the company planned underground coal gasification projects in the United Kingdom, India, Pakistan, China, and Mongolia.

== History ==
The company was established in 1994 as Pinnacle Mining NL. On 5 June 1998 it changed its name to Pinnacle VRB Limited. In 2006, the company acquired Cougar Energy Pty Ltd. After merger, the company changed name to Cougar Energy Limited on 16 February 2007.

Cougar Energy had a licence agreement with Ergo Exergy Technologies for utilization of the underground coal gasification technology developed by Ergo Exergy. The main underground coal gasification pilot project developed by Cougar Energy was located near Kingaroy, Queensland. The first syngas at Kingaroy pilot plant was produced on 16 March 2010. The company planned to use produced gas at the proposed 400 MW Kingaroy Power Plant.

Other projects included the underground coal gasification plants at Wandoan, Queensland (the Surat Basin), and Latrobe Valley, Victoria, in Australia and at the Thar Coal Field in Pakistan. Cougar Energy has also signed memorandums of understanding with Essar Oil and Exploration for cooperation in India and with Inner Mongolia Qi De Investment Co. Ltd. for cooperation in China. Its first commercial underground coal gasification project in Indonesia with its strategic partner PT MedcoEnergi Mining involved the development of a 30 megawatt power plant using UCG gas as feedstock.

== Operations ==
Company's conventional coal assets are situated in Bowen and Surat Basins in Queensland. It develops the Mackenzie and South Burnett coal projects.

Its subsidiary MRV Metals plans to produce silver and copper at Granite Belt.

== Incidents ==
On 16 July 2010, the Kingaroy pilot plant was temporary shut down after traces of benzene and toluene were detected in groundwater monitoring bores. The level of hydrocarbons in the water was 95% lower than Australian drinking water guidelines. Cougar Energy initiated two legal actions in Queensland seeking damages for the closing down of the Kingaroy plant as well as orders to permit the re-opening of operations at the plant. By September 2013 the company was unable to afford the legal struggle and pleaded guilty to three counts of contravening conditions of an environmental authority and was fined A$75,000 plus A$40,000 costs.

== See also ==
- Carbon Energy
- Linc Energy
