= West Siberian Branch of the Academy of Sciences of the Soviet Union =

Soviet research institution

West Siberian Branch of the Russian Academy of Sciences
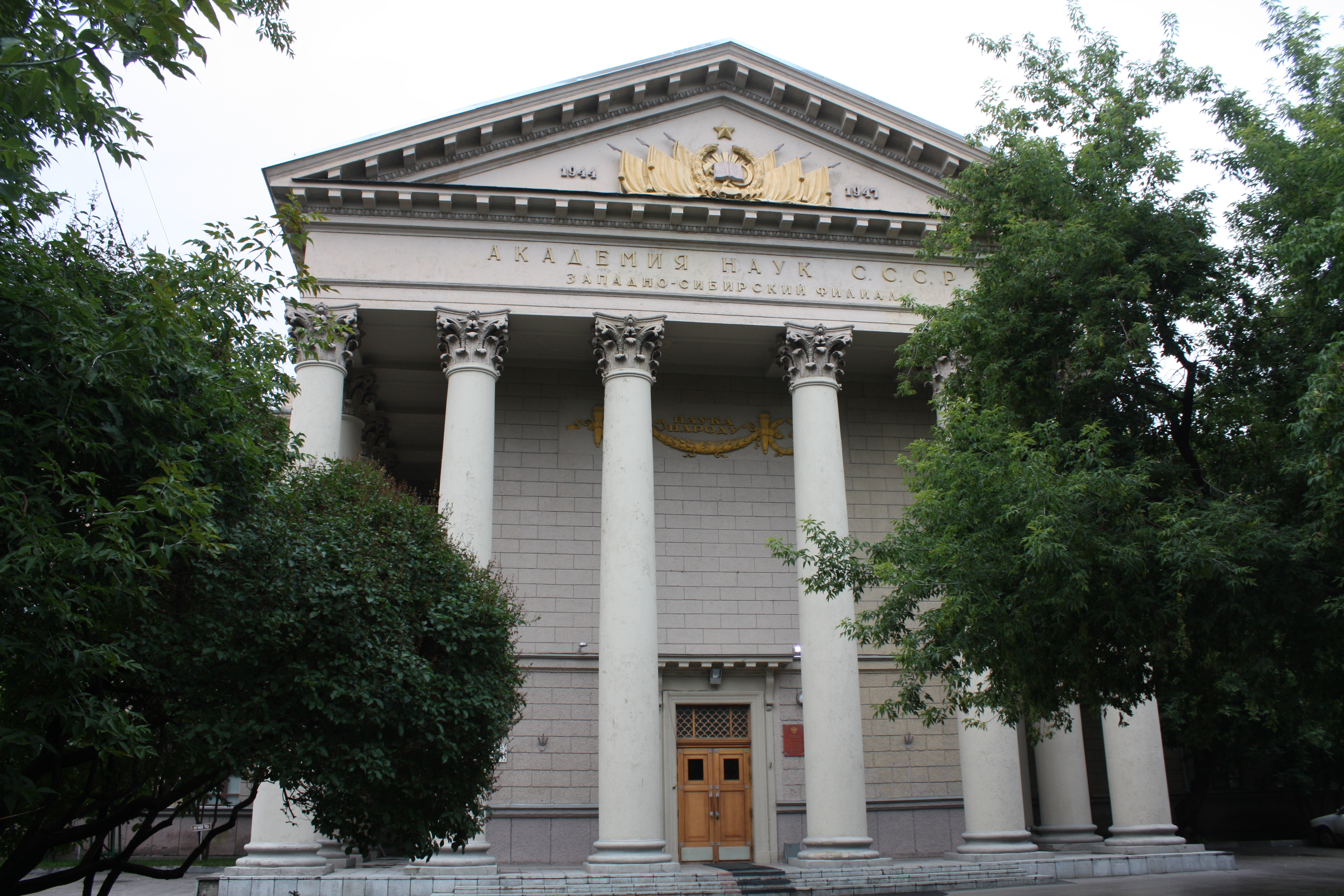
- The building of the Presidium of the WSB AS USSR, modern the ISEA SB RAS
- Chair: Alexander Skochinsky; Timofey Gorbachyov
- Location: Novosibirsk, Russia

The West Siberian Branch of the Academy of Sciences of the Soviet Union was a Soviet research institution, a branch of the Academy of Sciences of the Soviet Union, that existed from 1944 to 1958. Its head office was located in Novosibirsk. The organization preceded the establishment of Novosibirsk Scientific Center of the SB AS USSR.

== History ==
The West Siberian Branch of the Academy of Sciences of the Soviet Union was established by the Council of People's Commissars Decree of 21 October 1943 on the basis of which the Presidium AS USSR Decree of 8 February 1944 On the organization of the West Siberian Branch of the Academy of Sciences of the Soviet Union was adopted.

The organization was formed in difficult wartime conditions with a shortage of laboratory equipment, scientific literature and a lack of office and residential premises. For example, in Novosibirsk Oblast at that time the branch received only two scientific institutions: a vitamin station and a chemical laboratory. The staff of the branch was replenished with employees of regional research organizations and higher educational institutions. From 1944 to 1948, the number of employees increased from 80 to 136, most of whom did not have scientific degrees.

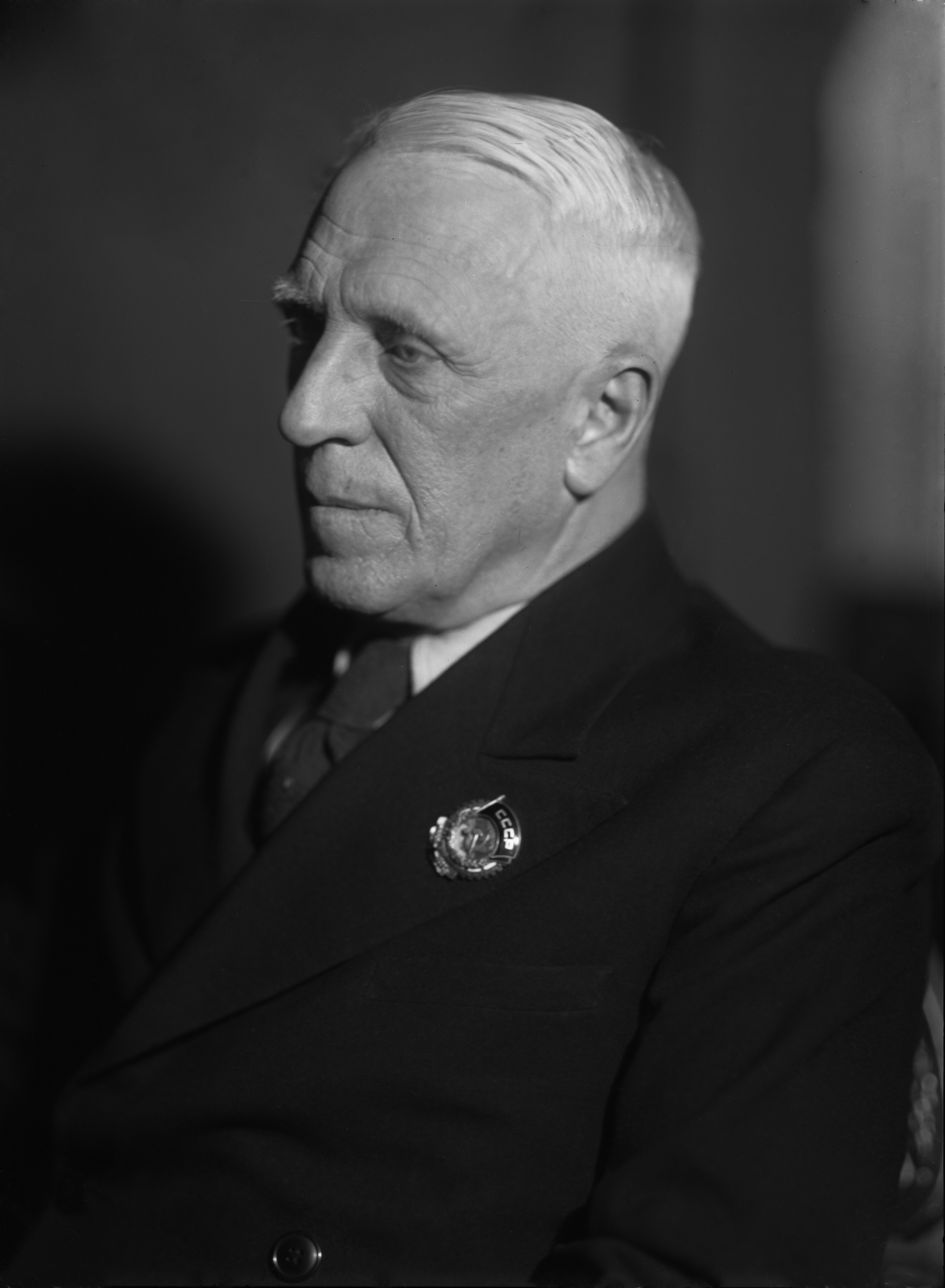
Alexander Skochinsky, the first chairman of the West Siberian Branch

At first, most of the qualified employees were specialists from higher educational institutions and scientific organizations of Tomsk, Prokopievsk, Stalinsk and other cities of West Siberia, thanks to which the branch became one of the largest organizations of a complex type in the network of academic centers. On March 7, 1946, the Presidium of the Academy of Sciences of the Soviet Union began a more expanded program of establishing new laboratories at the institutes of the West Siberian Branch, as well as the creation of the Sector of Physics, the Bureau of Economic Research and the Botanical Garden.

After the AS USSR Decree of 20 January 1950, the creation of new scientific organizations began: the Sector of Hydrology and Hydraulic Engineering, the Institute of Machine Engineering (it was practically not implemented), the Complex Research Permanent Establishment in Kemerovo, the Hydro-Galurgical Station within the Kulunda Plain and the North Complex Research Station.

By the Presidium of the AS USSR Decree of 28 August 1953, the Medical and Biological Institute was renamed the Biological Institute; the Department of Technical Physics was created on the basis of the Technical Physics Sector; but the Complex Research Permanent Establishment in Kemerovo, the North Complex Research Station and the Hydro-Galurgical Station in Kulunda were liquidated according to this Decree. By the Presidium AS USSR Decree of 27 May 1955 and the Order of Presidium AS USSR of 24 December 1956, the Institute of Radiophysics and Electronics was established on the basis of the Department of Technical Physics. By the AS USSR Decree of 26 April 1957, the Mining and Geological Institute was divided into two research organizations: the Institute of Mining and the Institute of Geology.

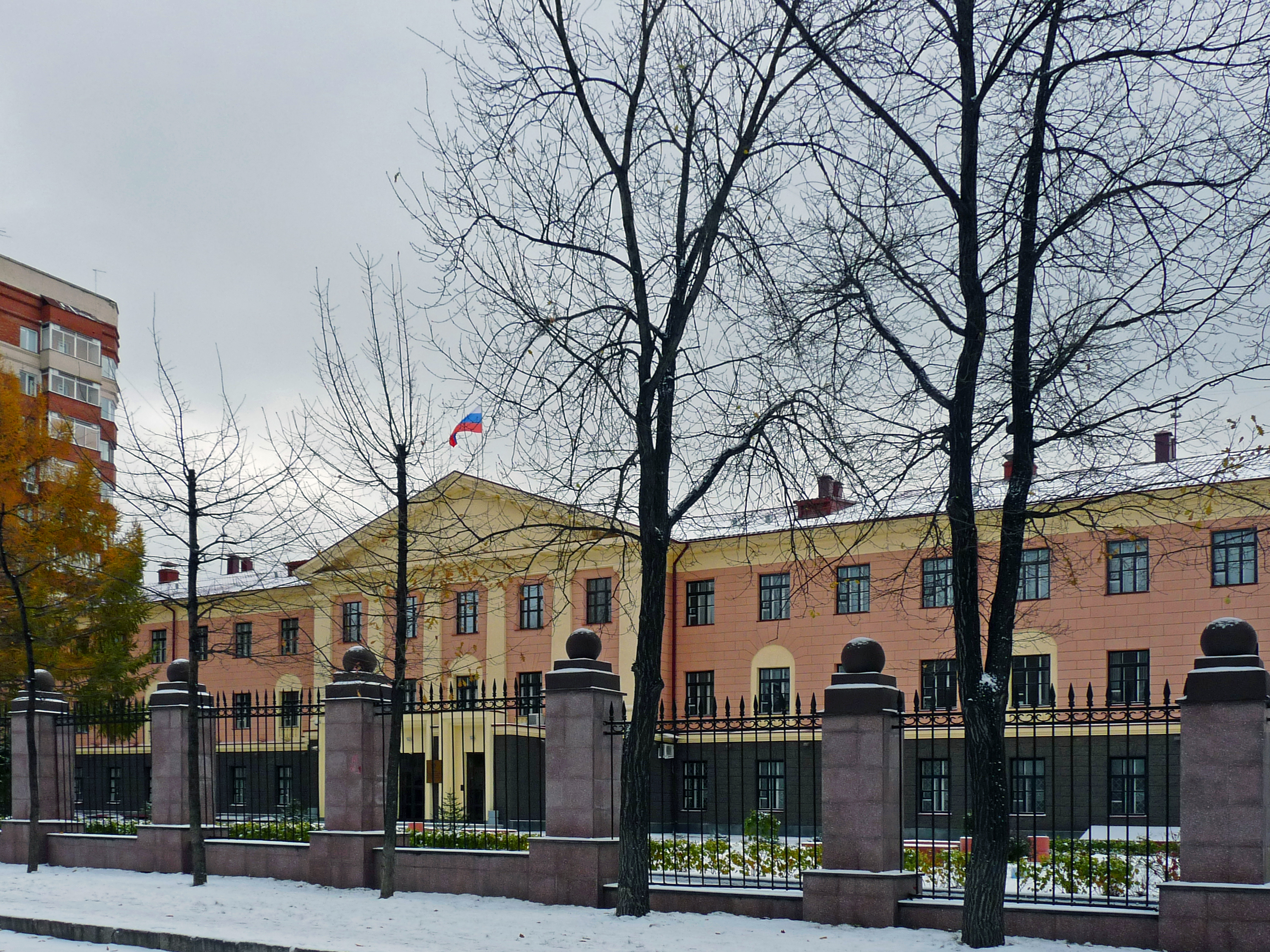
The building of the former Chemical and Metallurgical Institute, currently the Representative Office of the President of Russia

In 1957, the branch included the Mining Institute, the Institute of Geology, the Biological Institute, the Institute of Radiophysics and Electronics, the Transport and Energy Institute, the Chemical and Metallurgical Institute, as well as the Department of Agricultural Mechanization, the Department of Economic Research and the Botanical Garden. By the beginning of 1958, 1033 employees worked at the WSB AS USSR, including 346 scientific workers (16 doctors and professors, 113 candidates of sciences).

On 1 January 1959, the West Siberian Branch was liquidated in accordance with the Presidium of the USSR Decree of 21 November 1958, and its institutes became part of the Novosibirsk Scientific Center of the SB AS USSR.

== Activities ==
Efforts of the organization were mainly directed to the study of the mineral resources of the West Siberia.

Among the tasks of the research institutes of the branch were the expanding the raw material base of non-ferrous and ferrous metallurgy, the creation of effective methods for the extraction of minerals, the development of the foundations for the branches of the chemical industry (organic synthesis and coal chemistry), the search for the most appropriate ways to use energy resources, the study of the flora and fauna of the West Siberia, the development of transport communications etc.

In 1950s, the largest studies of the branch were devoted to the geological structure of the West Siberian Plain and adjacent territories. In addition, the organization was looking for ways to increase the mechanization of mining, it investigated the conditions of high-frequency communication in mines and studied the possibility of using local raw materials for silicate and aluminium industry as well as efficient coal combustion methods. The branch also studied the mineral resources of Kulunda lakes, energy resources of Siberian rivers and was looking for ways to improve soil fertility. It also studied some issues related to the economics of industry and agriculture.

On a number of issues, the organization became the coordinating center not only of West Siberia, but also of the Soviet Union as a whole. The activities of the organization extended to seven regions: Novosibirsk, Omsk, Tomsk, Kemerovo, Tumen oblasts, as well as Altai and Krasnoyarsk krais.

== Chairmen ==
- Alexander Skochinsky (1944–1954), a Soviet mining scientist, academician of the Academy of Sciences of the USSR, a laureate of the USSR State Prize twice.
- Timofey Gorbachyov (1954–1959), a Soviet mining specialist, a laureate of the Stalin Prize.
