= Shandong Energy =

Coal-mining company based in Jinan, China

Shandong Energy Group Company Limited
- Trade name: Shandong Energy Group
- Native name: 山东能源集团有限公司
- Industry: Coal mining
- Founded: 21 March 2011
- Headquarters: Jinan, Shandong, China
- Key people: Li Wei (Chairman)
- Products: Coal; Shale oil Electrical power
- Revenue: US$ 122.4 billion (2023)
- Net income: US$ 830 million (2023)
- Total assets: US$ 141.2 billion (2023)
- Owner: State-owned Assets Supervision and Administration Commission of the Government of Shandong Province
- Number of employees: 214,409 (2023)
- Website: english.shandong-energy.com

Shandong Energy Group Co. Ltd. (Chinese: 山东能源集团有限公司) is a state owned coal-mining company headquartered in Jinan, Shandong, China. It is among the seven largest Chinese coal companies. The group was created in March 2011 by merging six existing coal mining companies. These companies included Xinwen Mining Group, Zaozhuang Mining Group, Zibo Mining Group, Feicheng Mining Group, Linyi Mining Group and Longkou Mining Group.

Shandong Energy and Yankuang Group merged in 2020, following a wave of mergers of state-owned companies throughout China. The new parent company kept the Shandong Energy Group name.

In 2024, Shandong Energy was responsible for 674 Mt of CO_{2} emissions, which was 1.74% of global CO_{2} emissions.

== Ownership ==
The company is a Chinese state-owned enterprise. It is wholly owned by the Shandong Provincial SASAC, not to be confused with the central government's SASAC.

== Coal ==
Shadong Energy owns 29 mines. In 2011, the company mined 108.2 million metric tonnes of coal and is planning to produce 120 million metric tonnes in 2012. In addition to the production in China, the company is developing a coal mine in British Columbia, Canada, and plans to expand to Australia, Burma, and Cambodia. In March 2012, the company's subsidiary Linyi Mining Group made a take-over bid for Australian coal company Rocklands Richfield.

In the Yining mining area, the companies subsidiary Xinwen Mining Group together with Australian Linc Energy has planned to develop a coal gasification project with a capacity of 2 billion cubic metres (71 billion cubic feet) of syngas per year.

The company's subsidiary Longkou Mining Group is the only company in China mining coal beneath the seabed. The mining is carried out at the Beizao Underwater Coal Mine in Bohai Bay to the north of the Shandong Peninsula.

== Oil shale ==
Oil shale is produced as a coal mining by-product by company's subsidiary Longkou Mining Group. It operates shale oil plant which is equipped with 40 Fushun retorts. The shale oil production is about 120,000 tonnes per year and the planned full capacity is 200,000 tonnes of shale oil per year. The company also plans to utilize Enefit-280 technology. In addition, the company plans to burn shale char mixed with particulate oil shale in fluidized bed combustion for power generation, and the shale ash would be utilized for production of building material.

== Power generation ==
The company owns several coal and oil shale-fired power stations. In addition, it plans to develop nuclear, wind and solar power.

== Subsidiaries ==
- Feicheng Mining Group (100%)
