= Carbon Energy =

Carbon Energy Corporation
- Formerly: Metex Resources Limited
- Type: Public
- Traded as: OTCQX: CRBO
- Industry: coalgas
- Founded: 2004; 22 years ago
- Headquarters: Milton, Queensland, Australia
- Key people: Morné Engelbrecht (CEO)
- Products: Syngas, ammonia
- Website: carbonenergy.com.au

Carbon Energy Corporation (formerly known as Metex Resources Limited) is an Australian global energy technology provider and services company with expertise in unconventional syngas extraction utilising its proprietary Underground Coal Gasification (UCG) technology. It operates an underground coal gasification pilot plant at Bloodwood Creek, Queensland, Australia. In 2009, Carbon Energy signed an agreement with the Chilean company Antofagasta Minerals to develop an underground coal gasification project in Mulpún, Chile. The Company is headquartered in Brisbane, Australia, is listed on the Australian Securities Exchange (ASX) as CNX and is quoted on the OTCQX International Exchange as CNXAY in the United States.

Carbon Energy has gone in to administration. The Australian government failed to act.

== See also ==
- Coal mining in Chile
- Cougar Energy
- Linc Energy
