= Arckaringa Basin =

Sedimentary basin in South Australia

Coordinates: 29°S 134.5°E

Location of Arckaringa Basin in South Australia

The Arckaringa Basin is an endorheic basin in Australia. It is 80,000 square kilometres (31,000 sq mi) in size and is located in South Australia.

The basin surrounds the town of Coober Pedy in northern South Australia. It located in the north of the Gawler Block.

== Structure ==
The basin structure features an elevated central platform. There are both glacigene sediments deposited in the upper Carboniferous and Permian coal measures which are mostly covered by Mesozoic sediments. The Boorthana Formation in the east bears diamictite.

The eastern boundary of the basin contain some outcrops of pavements which prove glaciation. Infills in the Arckaringa Basin are dominated by mass flow deposits.

== Resources ==
Reports as of February 2013 estimate that the oil-bearing shale of the basin may contain between 3.5 and 233 billion barrels (560×10^{6} and 37,040×10^{6} m^{3}) of petroleum or petroleum equivalent.
