= Underground coal gasification =

Conversion of coal to gas

- Process type: chemical
- Industrial sector(s): oil and gas industry coal industry
- Feedstock: coal
- Product(s): coal gas
- Leading companies: Africary; Linc Energy; Carbon Energy
- Main facilities: Angren Power Station (Uzbekistan); Majuba Power Station (South Africa); Chinchilla Demonstration Facility (Australia)
- Inventor: Carl Wilhelm Siemens
- Year of invention: 1868
- Developer(s): African Carbon Energy; Ergo Exergy Technologies; Skochinsky Institute of Mining

Underground coal gasification (UCG) is an industrial process which converts coal into product gas. UCG is an in-situ gasification process, carried out in non-mined coal seams using injection of oxidants and steam. The product gas is brought to the surface through production wells drilled from the surface.

The predominant product gases are methane, hydrogen, carbon monoxide and carbon dioxide. Ratios vary depending upon formation pressure, depth of coal and oxidant balance. Gas output may be combusted for electricity production. Alternatively, the gas output can be used to produce synthetic natural gas, or hydrogen and carbon monoxide can be used as a chemical feedstock for the production of fuels (e.g. diesel), fertilizer, explosives and other products.

The technique can be applied to coal resources that are otherwise unprofitable or technically complicated to extract by traditional mining methods. UCG offers an alternative to conventional coal mining methods for some resources. It has been linked to a number of concerns from environmental campaigners.

== History ==
The earliest recorded mention of the idea of underground coal gasification was in 1868, when Sir William Siemens in his address to the Chemical Society of London suggested the underground gasification of waste and slack coal in the mine. Russian chemist Dmitri Mendeleyev further developed Siemens' idea over the next couple of decades.

In 1909–1910, American, Canadian, and British patents were granted to American engineer Anson G. Betts for "a method of using unmined coal". The first experimental work on UCG was planned to start in 1912 in Durham, the United Kingdom, under the leadership of Nobel Prize winner Sir William Ramsay. However, Ramsay was unable to commence the UCG field work before the beginning of the World War I, and the project was abandoned.

=== Initial tests ===
In 1913, Ramsay's work was noticed by Russian exile Vladimir Lenin who wrote in the newspaper Pravda an article "Great Victory of Technology" promising to liberate workers from hazardous work in coal mines by underground coal gasification.

Between 1928 and 1939, underground tests were conducted in the Soviet Union by the state-owned organization Podzemgaz. The first test using the chamber method started on 3 March 1933 in the Moscow coal basin at Krutova mine. This test and several following tests failed. The first successful test was conducted on 24 April 1934 in Lysychansk, Donetsk Basin, by the Donetsk Institute of Coal Chemistry.

The first pilot-scale process started 8 February 1935 in Horlivka, Donetsk Basin. Production gradually increased, and, in 1937–1938, the local chemical plant began using the produced gas. In 1940, experimental plants were built in Lysychansk and Tula. After World War II, the Soviet activities culminated in the operation of five industrial-scale UCG plants in the early 1960s. However, Soviet activities subsequently declined due to the discovery of extensive natural gas resources. In 1964, the Soviet program was downgraded. As of 2004 only Angren site in Uzbekistan and Yuzhno-Abinsk site in Russia continued operations.

=== Post-war experiments ===
After World War II, the shortage in energy and the diffusion of the Soviets' results provoked new interest in Western Europe and the United States. In the United States, tests were conducted in 1947–1958 in Gorgas, Alabama. The experiments were carried out in a partnership between Alabama Power and the US Bureau of Mines. The experiments at Gorgas continued for seven years until 1953, at which point the US Bureau of Mines withdrew its support for them after the US Congress withdrew funding. In total 6,000 tons of coal were combusted by 1953 in these experiments. The experiments succeeded in producing combustible synthetic gas. The experiments were reactivated after 1954, this time with hydrofracturing using a mixture of oil and sand, but finally discontinued in 1958 as uneconomical. From 1973–1989, extensive testing was carried out. The United States Department of Energy and several large oil and gas companies conducted several tests. Lawrence Livermore National Laboratory conducted three tests in 1976–1979 at the Hoe Creek test site in Campbell County, Wyoming.

In cooperation with Sandia National Laboratories and Radian Corporation, Livermore conducted experiments in 1981–1982 at the WIDCO Mine near Centralia, Washington. In 1979–1981, an underground gasification of steeply dipping seams was demonstrated near Rawlins, Wyoming. The program culminated in the Rocky Mountain trial in 1986–1988 near Hanna, Wyoming.

In Europe, the stream method was tested at Bois-la-Dame, Belgium, in 1948 and in Jerada, Morocco, in 1949. The borehole method was tested at Newman Spinney and Bayton, United Kingdom, in 1949–1950. A few years later, a first attempt was made to develop a commercial pilot plan, the P5 Trial, at Newman Spinney Derbyshire in 1958–1959. The Newman Spinney project was authorised in 1957 and comprised a steam boiler and a 3.75 MW turbo-alternator to generate electricity. The National Coal Board abandoned the gasification scheme in summer 1959. During the 1960s, European work stopped, due to an abundance of energy and low oil prices, but recommenced in the 1980s. Field tests were conducted in 1981 at Bruay-en-Artois, in 1983–1984 at La Haute Deule, France, in 1982–1985 at Thulin, Belgium and in 1992–1999 at the El Tremedal site, Province of Teruel, Spain. In 1988, the Commission of the European Communities and six European countries formed a European Working Group.

In New Zealand, a small scale trial was operated in 1994 in the Huntly Coal Basin. In Australia, tests were conducted starting in 1999. China has operated the largest program since the late 1980s, including 16 trials.

== Process ==
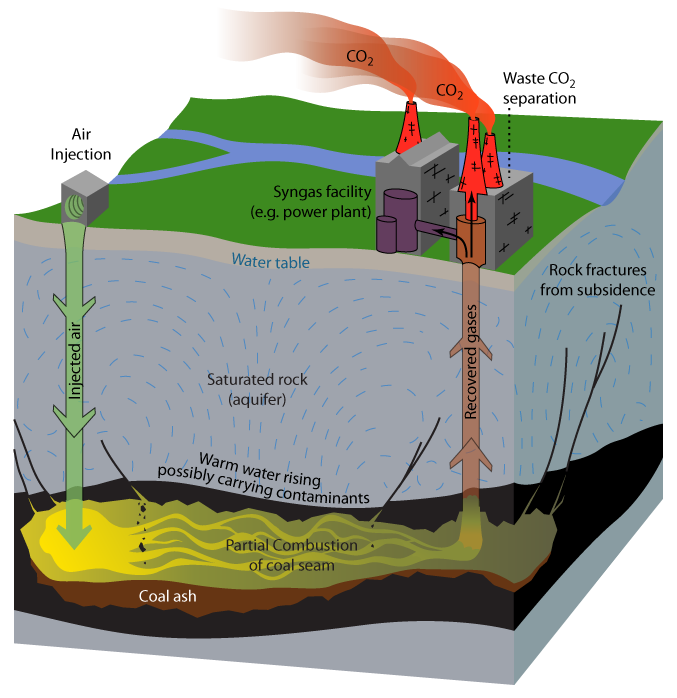
The underground coal gasification process.

Underground coal gasification converts coal to gas while still in the coal seam (in-situ). Gas is produced and extracted through wells drilled into the unmined coal seam. Injection wells are used to supply the oxidants (air, oxygen) and steam to ignite and fuel the underground combustion process. Separate production wells are used to bring the product gas to the surface. The high pressure combustion is conducted at temperature of 700–900 °C (1,290–1,650 °F), but it may reach up to 1,500 °C (2,730 °F).

The process decomposes coal and generates carbon dioxide (CO_{2}), hydrogen (H_{2}), carbon monoxide (CO) and methane (CH_{4}). In addition, small quantities of various contaminants including sulfur oxides (SO_{x}), mono-nitrogen oxides (NO_{x}), and hydrogen sulfide (H_{2}S) are produced. As the coal face burns and the immediate area is depleted, the volumes of oxidants injected are controlled by the operator.

There are a variety of designs for underground coal gasification, all of which provide a means of injecting oxidant and possibly steam into the reaction zone, and also provide a path for production gases to flow in a controlled manner to the surface. As coal varies considerably in its resistance to flow, depending on its age, composition and geological history, the natural permeability of the coal to transport the gas is generally not adequate. For high pressure break-up of the coal, hydro-fracturing, electric-linkage, and reverse combustion may be used in varying degrees.

The simplest design uses two vertical wells: one injection and one production. Sometimes it is necessary to establish communication between the two wells, and a common method is to use reverse combustion to open internal pathways in the coal. Another alternative is to drill a lateral well connecting the two vertical wells. UCG with simple vertical wells, inclined wells, and long deflected wells was used in the Soviet Union. The Soviet UCG technology was further developed by Ergo Exergy and tested at Linc's Chinchilla site in 1999–2003, in Majuba UCG plant (2007) and in Cougar Energy's failed UCG pilot in Australia (2010).

In the 1980s and 1990s, a method known as CRIP (controlled retraction and injection point) was developed (but not patented) by the Lawrence Livermore National Laboratory and demonstrated in the United States and Spain. This method uses a vertical production well and an extended lateral well drilled directionally in the coal. The lateral well is used for injection of oxidants and steam, and the injection point can be changed by retracting the injector.

Carbon Energy was the first to adopt a system which uses a pair of lateral wells in parallel. This system allows a consistent separation distance between the injection and production wells, while progressively mining the coal between the two wells. This approach is intended to provide access to the greatest quantity of coal per well set and also allows greater consistency in production gas quality.

A new technology has been announced in May 2012 by developer Portman Energy wherein a method called SWIFT (Single Well Integrated Flow Tubing) uses a single vertical well for both oxidant delivery and syngas recovery. The design has a single casing of tubing strings enclosed and filled with an inert gas to allow for leak monitoring, corrosion prevention and heat transfer. A series of horizontally drilled lateral oxidant delivery lines into the coal and a single or multiple syngas recovery pipeline(s) allow for a larger area of coal to be combusted at one time. The developers claim this method will increase syngas production by up to ten (10) times above earlier design approaches. The single well design means development costs are significantly lower and the facilities and wellheads are concentrated at a single point reducing surface access roads, pipelines and facilities footprint.[9] The UK patent office have advised that the full patent application GB2501074 by Portman Energy be published 16 October 2013.

A wide variety of coals are amenable to the UCG process and coal grades from lignite through to bituminous may be successfully gasified. A great many factors are taken into account in selecting appropriate locations for UCG, including surface conditions, hydrogeology, lithology, coal quantity, and quality. According to Andrew Beath of CSIRO Exploration & Mining other important criteria include:

- Depth of 100–600 metres (330–1,970 ft)
- Thickness more than 5 metres (16 ft)
- Ash content less than 60%
- Minimal discontinuities
- Isolation from valued aquifers.

According to Peter Sallans of Liberty Resources Limited, the key criteria are:

- Depth of 100–1,400 metres (330–4,590 ft)
- Thickness more than 3 metres (9.8 ft)
- Ash content less than 60%
- Minimal discontinuities
- Isolation from valued aquifers.

== Economics ==
Underground coal gasification allows access to coal resources that are not economically recoverable by other technologies, e.g., seams that are too deep, low grade, or that have a thin stratum profile. By some estimates, UCG will increase economically recoverable reserves by 600 billion tonnes. Lawrence Livermore National Laboratory estimates that UCG could increase recoverable coal reserves in the US by 300%. Livermore and Linc Energy claim that UCG capital and operating costs are lower than those for traditional mining.

UCG product gas is used to fire combined cycle gas turbine (CCGT) power plants, with some studies suggesting power island efficiencies of up to 55%, with a combined UCG/CCGT process efficiency of up to 43%. CCGT power plants using UCG product gas instead of natural gas can achieve higher outputs than pulverized-coal-fired power stations (and associated upstream processes), resulting in a large decrease in greenhouse gas (GHG) emissions.

UCG product gas can also be used for:

- Synthesis of liquid fuels;
- Manufacture of chemicals, such as ammonia and fertilizers;
- Production of synthetic natural gas;
- Production of hydrogen.

In addition, carbon dioxide produced as a by-product of underground coal gasification may be re-directed and used for enhanced oil recovery.

Underground product gas is an alternative to natural gas and potentially offers cost savings by eliminating mining, transport, and solid waste. The expected cost savings could increase given higher coal prices driven by emissions trading, taxes, and other emissions reduction policies, e.g. the Australian Government's proposed Carbon Pollution Reduction Scheme.

=== Projects ===
Cougar Energy and Linc Energy conducted pilot projects in Queensland, Australia based on UCG technology provided by Ergo Exergy until their activities were banned in 2016. Yerostigaz, a subsidiary of Linc Energy, produces about 1 million cubic metres (35 million cubic feet) of syngas per day in Angren, Uzbekistan. The produced syngas is used as fuel in the Angren Power Station.

In South Africa, Eskom (with Ergo Exergy as technology provider) is operating a demonstration plant in preparation for supplying commercial quantities of syngas for commercial production of electricity. African Carbon Energy has received environmental approval for a 50 MW power station near Theunissen in the Free State province and is bid-ready to participate in the DOE's Independent Power Producer (IPP) gas program where UCG has been earmarked as a domestic gas supply option.

ENN has operated a successful pilot project in China.

In addition, there are companies developing projects in Australia, UK, Hungary, Pakistan, Poland, Bulgaria, Canada, US, Chile, China, Indonesia, India, South Africa, Botswana, and other countries. According to the Zeus Development Corporation, more than 60 projects are in development around the world.

== Environmental and social impacts ==
Eliminating mining eliminates mine safety issues. Compared to traditional coal mining and processing, the underground coal gasification eliminates surface damage and solid waste discharge, and reduces sulfur dioxide (SO_{2}) and nitrogen oxide (NO_{x}) emissions. For comparison, the ash content of UCG syngas is estimated to be approximately 10 mg/m^{3} compared to smoke from traditional coal burning where ash content may be up to 70 mg/m^{3}. However, UCG operations cannot be controlled as precisely as surface gasifiers. Variables include the rate of water influx, the distribution of reactants in the gasification zone, and the growth rate of the cavity. These can only be estimated from temperature measurements, and analyzing product gas quality and quantity.

Subsidence is a common issue with all forms of extractive industry. While UCG leaves the ash behind in the cavity, the depth of the void left after UCG is typically greater than that with other methods of coal extraction.

Underground combustion produces NO_{x} and SO_{2} and lowers emissions, including acid rain.

Regarding emissions of atmospheric CO_{2}, proponents of UCG have argued that the process has advantages for geologic carbon storage. Combining UCG with CCS (Carbon capture and storage) technology allows re-injecting some of the CO_{2} on-site into the highly permeable rock created during the burning process, i.e. the cavity where the coal used to be. Contaminants, such as ammonia and hydrogen sulfide, can be removed from product gas at a relatively low cost.

However, as of late 2013, CCS had never been successfully implemented on a commercial scale as it was not within the scope of UCG projects and some had also resulted in environmental concerns. In Australia in 2014 the Government filed charges over alleged serious environmental harm stemming from Linc Energy's pilot Underground Coal Gasification plant near Chinchilla in the Queensland's foodbowl of the Darling Downs. When UCG was banned in April, 2016 the Queensland Mines Minister Dr Anthony Lynham stated "The potential risks to Queensland's environment and our valuable agricultural industries far outweigh any potential economic benefits. UCG activity simply doesn't stack up for further use in Queensland."

Meanwhile, as an article in the Bulletin of Atomic Sciences pointed out in March 2010 that UCG could result in massive carbon emissions. "If an additional 4 trillion tonnes [of coal] were extracted without the use of carbon capture or other mitigation technologies atmospheric carbon-dioxide levels could quadruple", the article stated, "resulting in a global mean temperature increase of between 5 and 10 degrees Celsius".

Aquifer contamination is a potential environmental concern. Organic and often toxic materials (such as phenol) could remain in the underground chamber after gasification if the chamber is not decommissioned. Site decommissioning and rehabilitation are standard requirements in resources development approvals whether that be UCG, oil and gas, or mining, and decommissioning of UCG chambers is relatively straightforward. Phenol leachate is the most significant environmental hazard due to its high water solubility and high reactiveness to gasification. The US Dept of Energy's Lawrence Livermore Institute conducted an early UCG experiment at very shallow depth and without hydrostatic pressure at Hoe Creek, Wyoming. They did not decommission that site and testing showed contaminants (including the carcinogen benzene) in the chamber. The chamber was later flushed and the site successfully rehabilitated. Some research has shown that the persistence of minor quantities of these contaminants in groundwater is short-lived and that ground water recovers within two years. Even so, proper practice, supported by regulatory requirements, should be to flush and decommission each chamber and to rehabilitate UCG sites.

Newer UCG technologies and practices claim to address environmental concerns, such as issues related to groundwater contamination, by implementing the "Clean Cavern" concept. This is the process whereby the gasifier is self-cleaned via the steam produced during operation and also after decommissioning. Another important practice is maintaining the pressure of the underground gasifier below that of the surrounding groundwater. The pressure difference forces groundwater to flow continuously into the gasifier and no chemical from the gasifier can escape into the surrounding strata. The pressure is controlled by the operator using pressure valves at the surface.

== In Fiction ==
Science Fiction Author Cixin Liu uses the process of UCG as the main plot point of his short story "Fire in the Earth", where a fictional engineer spearheads a pilot Coal Gasification plant in China.

== See also ==
- Coalbed methane
- Landfill gas
- Fischer–Tropsch process
