= Syntroleum =

Syntroleum Corporation
- Company type: Public
- Traded as: Nasdaq: SYNM
- Industry: Engineering
- Founded: 1984
- Founder: Kenneth Agee
- Defunct: June 3, 2014
- Fate: Acquired by Renewable Energy Group
- Headquarters: Tulsa, Oklahoma, United States
- Key people: Edward G. Roth (President and CEO)
- Products: GTL and CTL technologies
- Website: www.syntroleum.com

Syntroleum Corporation was a United States company engaged in development and commercialization of proprietary gas to liquids (GTL) process known as the Syntroleum Process. Renewable Energy Group acquired the company on June 4, 2014 and was in turn acquired by Chevron on February 28, 2022

== History ==
Syntroleum was incorporated in 1984 by Kenneth Agee. It became a publicly held company on Nasdaq in August, 1998, when it merged with publicly traded SLH Corporation.

On March 16, 2004, the company was reported shipping the first load of diesel from its gas-to-liquids demonstration plant at the Port of Catoosa near Tulsa to the Massachusetts Institute of Technology for testing by the Department of Energy.

Syntroleum worked with the U. S. Air Force to flight-test a synthetic jet fuel blend. The Air Force, which is the U.S. military's largest user of fuel, began exploring alternative fuel sources in 1999. On December 15, 2006, a B-52 took off from Edwards AFB for the first time powered solely by a 50–50 blend of JP-8 and Syntroleum's FT fuel. The seven-hour flight test was considered a success. The goal of the flight test program was to qualify the fuel blend for fleet use on the service's B-52s, and then flight test and qualification on other aircraft.

In June 2007, Syntroleum Corp and meat producer Tyson Foods Inc. announced plans to set up a $150 million plant in a Joint Venture that became known as Dynamic Fuels LLC, to produce fuel from animal fat, aimed at the renewable diesel and jet fuel markets. The facility at Geismar, Louisiana, completed in 2010, was the first large scale renewable diesel biorefinery built in the U.S.

The Dynamic Fuels JV represented a significant shift in corporate direction away from GTL technology and was accompanied by restructuring, leading to Kenneth Agee departing the company and buying Syntroleum’s research and laboratory facilities at Tulsa to form a new company Emerging Fuels Technology, also employing several former Syntroleum staff. This company continues to be focused on developing and commercializing GTL and upgrading technology.

It was announced in December 2013 that Syntroleum's operations would be sold to Renewable Energy Group (REG) Inc. of Ames, Iowa. This transaction was completed on June 4, 2014. REG also bought out Tyson Food's interest in Dynamic Fuels. The Renewable Energy Group was acquired by Chevron on February 28, 2022 and is now known asChevron Renewable Energy Group.

== Technology ==
The Syntroleum Process produces synthetic fuel by the Fischer–Tropsch process, which can use natural gas, coal, biogas or biomass as feedstocks. The technology is detailed in Robert A. Meyers. 2004,1997,1986. Handbook of Petroleum Refining Processes, Third Edition. McGraw-Hill Education.
