= Skochinsky Institute of Mining =

Research institute in Lyubertsy, Russia

The Skochinsky Institute of Mining (full name: National Mining Research Center – A.A. Skochinsky Institute of Mining; Russian: Институт горного дела им. А. А. Скочинского) is an institute of mining located in Lyubertsy, Russia. It was established in 1927 as the All-Union Institute of Coal. In 1959, it merged with the Institute of Mining of the Academy of Sciences of the USSR, established in 1938. In 1962, it was named after academician Alexander Skochinsky. In 1968, a branch of the Skochinsky Institute of Mining was established in Kohtla-Järve, Estonia, which researched oil shale mining.
