= South German Jurassic =

Set of geological formations in Central Europe

Lithostratigraphy of the South German Jurassic. Abbreviations: Humph.-Fm = Humphriesioolith Formation; L.Bk-Fm = Liegende Bankkalk Formation; H.Bk-Fm = Hangende Bankkalk Formation; Zm-Fm = Zementmergel Formation; S.-Fm = Solnhofen Formation; Rö.-Fm = Rögling Formation; U.-Fm = Usseltal Formation; Mö.-Fm = Mörnsheim Formation; N.-Fm = Neuburg Formation; R.-Fm = Rennertshofen Formation

The term South German Jurassic (German: Süddeutscher Jura) in Earth history is used to refer to a lithostratigraphic rock unit at the hierarchical level of a supergroup. The rocks of the South German Jurassic were mainly deposited during the Jurassic period (199 to 146 million years ago). The boundaries of the South German Jurassic and those of the chronostratigraphic or international Jurassic are not, however, exactly coincident. Sediment deposition began rather later than the date of the international Triassic/Jurassic boundary and the youngest beds are Upper Jurassic in age, i.e. well before the international Jurassic/Cretaceous boundary.

The South German Jurassic is underlain by sediments of Keuper age; between them is a small stratigraphic hiatus. The upper boundary is discordant, the South German Jurassic is separated from the overlying beds by a large stratigraphic gap. In some areas it is locally succeeded by the Regensburg Green Sandstone, which is dated to the Cenomanian stage of the Cretaceous, in its southern fringes the South German Jurassic is overlain by Palaeogene molasse deposits.

== Divisions ==
The main divisions of the South German Jurassic are the:

- Black Jurassic - 199 to 175 million years ago
- Brown Jurassic - 175 to 161 million years ago
- White Jurassic -161 to 150 million years ago

== Literature ==
- Leopold von Buch: Über den Jura in Deutschland. Abhandlungen der königlichen Akademie der Wissenschaften zu Berlin, 1837: 49-135, Berlin, 1839 online
- Eckhard Mönnig: Der Jura in Norddeutschland in der STD 2002. Newsletters on Stratigraphy, 41(1-3): 253–261, Stuttgart, 2005 ISSN 0078-0421
- Albert Oppel: Die Juraformation Englands, Frankreichs und des südwestlichen Deutschlands. Württembergische naturwissenschaftliche Jahreshefte, 12-14: 857 pp., Stuttgart, 1856-58 ZDB-ID 219058-8
- Friedrich August Quenstedt: Das Flözgebirge Würtembergs. Mit besonderer Rücksicht auf den Jura. Verlag der Laupp'schen Buchhandlung, Tübingen, 1843.
- Friedrich August Quenstedt: Der Jura. Verlag der Laupp'schen Buchhandlung, Tübingen, 1856–57.
