= Brown Jurassic =

Set of geological formations in Central Europe

Lithostratigraphy of the South German Jurassic. Abbreviations: Humph.-Fm = Humphriesioolith Formation; L.Bk-Fm = Liegende Bankkalk Formation; H.Bk-Fm = Hangende Bankkalk Formation; Zm-Fm = Zementmergel Formation; S.-Fm = Solnhofen Formation; Rö.-Fm = Rögling Formation; U.-Fm = Usseltal Formation; Mö.-Fm = Mörnsheim Formation; N.-Fm = Neuburg Formation; R.-Fm = Rennertshofen Formation

The Brown Jurassic or Brown Jura (German: Brauner Jura or Braunjura) in Earth history refers to the middle of the three lithostratigraphic units of the South German Jurassic, the latter being understood not as a geographical, but a geological term in the sense of a lithostratigraphic super group. Formerly and even occasionally today in the popular scientific literature, this term is equated to the chronostratigraphic series of the Middle Jurassic. This is however not quite correct, because the Brown Jura does not exactly coincide with the chronostratigraphic boundaries of the Middle Jurassic. In addition, the term Dogger, which was formerly frequently used (and sometimes is today) as a synonym should no longer be used in connexion with the South German Jurassic. Instead the term "Dogger" should be reserved for the roughly equivalent lithostratigraphic unit in the North German Jurassic. The Brown Jurassic was deposited about 175-161 million years ago. The Brown Jurassic follows the lithostratigraphic unit of the Black Jurassic and is superimposed on the lithostratigraphic group of the White Jurassic.

== Literature ==
- Gert Bloos, Gerd Dietl & Günter Schweigert: Der Jura Süddeutschlands in der Stratigraphischen Tabelle von Deutschland 2002. Newsletters on Stratigraphy, 41(1-3): 263-277, Stuttgart, 2005, ISSN 0078-0421
- Eckhard Mönnig: Der Jura von Norddeutschland in der Stratigraphischen Tabelle von Deutschland 2002. Newsletters on Stratigraphy, 41(1-3): 253-261, Stuttgart, 2005.
- Friedrich August Quenstedt: Das Flözgebirge Würtembergs. Mit besonderer Rücksicht auf den Jura. Verlag der Laupp'schen Buchhandlung, Tübingen, 1843.
- Friedrich August Quenstedt: Der Jura. Verlag der Laupp’schen Buchhandlung, Tübingen, 1856-57.
