= Black Jurassic =

Set of geological formations in Central Europe

Lithostratigraphy of the South German Jurassic. Abbreviations: Humph.-Fm = Humphriesioolith Formation; L.Bk-Fm = Liegende Bankkalk Formation; H.Bk-Fm = Hangende Bankkalk Formation; Zm-Fm = Zementmergel Formation; S.-Fm = Solnhofen Formation; Rö.-Fm = Rögling Formation; U.-Fm = Usseltal Formation; Mö.-Fm = Mörnsheim Formation; N.-Fm = Neuburg Formation; R.-Fm = Rennertshofen Formation

The Black Jurassic or Black Jura (German: Schwarzer Jura) in Earth history refers to the lowest of the three lithostratigraphic units of the South German Jurassic, the latter being understood not as a geographical, but a geological term in the sense of a lithostratigraphic super group. Formerly and even occasionally today in the popular scientific literature, this term is equated to the chronostratigraphic series of the Lower Jurassic. This is however not quite correct, because the Black Jura does not exactly coincide with the chronostratigraphic boundaries of the Lower Jurassic. In addition, the term lias, which was formerly frequently used (and sometimes is today) as a synonym, should no longer be used in connexion with the South German Jurassic. Instead, the term lias, or North German Lias, should be reserved for the roughly equivalent lithostratigraphic unit in the North German Jurassic. The deposition of the Black Jurassic took place about 199 to 175 million years ago. The Black Jurassic follows the lithostratigraphic unit of the Keuper and is superimposed on the lithostratigraphic group of the Brown Jurassic.

== See also ==
- White Jurassic

== Literature ==
- Gert Bloos, Gerd Dietl & Günter Schweigert: Der Jura Süddeutschlands in der Stratigraphischen Tabelle von Deutschland 2002. Newsletters on Stratigraphy, 41(1–3): 263–277, Stuttgart, 2005, ISSN 0078-0421
- Eckhard Mönnig: Der Jura von Norddeutschland in der Stratigraphischen Tabelle von Deutschland 2002. Newsletters on Stratigraphy, 41(1–3): 253–261, Stuttgart, 2005.
- Friedrich August Quenstedt: Das Flözgebirge Würtembergs. Mit besonderer Rücksicht auf den Jura. Verlag der Laupp’schen Buchhandlung, Tübingen, 1843.
