= Impressamergel Formation =

Geologic formation in Germany

- Stratigraphic range: Oxfordian
- Type: Formation
- Underlies: Wohlgeschichtete Kalk Formation
- Overlies: Ornatenton Formation
- Thickness: 25 to 125 metres

Lithology
- Primary: Limestone

Location
- Country: Germany

The Impressamergel Formation is a geologic formation in Germany. It preserves fossils dating back to the Jurassic period.

== History ==
The term was proposed by Gert Bloos, Gerd Dietl and Günter Schweigert in 2005 for a lithostratigraphic rock formation. The name goes back to the term Impressakalke introduced by Friedrich August Quenstedt in 1857. The name is derived from the brachiopod Terebratula impressa (today Aulacothyris impressa ).

== Definition and distribution area ==
The Impressamergel formation includes dark gray to light gray limestones with some embedded limestone beds. The lower limit is relatively well defined by the change in color (from "brown" to "white" Jura). The upper limit is formed by the onset of the limestone of the Wohlgeschichtete Kalk Formation . It meshes with the Lochen Formation especially in the higher part and is increasingly replaced by this formation. In the Upper Rhine Valley, it is represented by Kandern Formation, Korallenkalk Formation and Nerineenkalk Formation . The distribution of the Impressamergel formation extends over the entire Swabian Alb to the Wutach area.

== See also ==
- List of fossiliferous stratigraphic units in Germany
