= Stadtfeld =

Stadtfeld may refer to:

- USS Stadtfeld, a destroyer escort used by the United States Navy during World War 2
- Martin Stadtfeld (born 1980), German pianist
- Kallen Stadtfeld, a fictional character in the anime series Code Geass: Lelouch of the Rebellion
- Stadtfeld Formation, a geologic formation in Germany

== See also ==
- Oberstadtfeld, a municipality in Rhineland-Palatinate, Germany
- Niederstadtfeld, a municipality in Rhineland-Palatinate, Germany
- Stadtfeld Ost and Stadtfeld West, districts of Magdeburg, Saxony-Anhalt, Germany
