= List of fossiliferous stratigraphic units in Germany =

Group or Formation	Period	Notes
Ahbach Formation	Devonian	
Ahlen Formation	Cretaceous	
Ahrdorf Formation	Devonian	
Alzey Formation	Paleogene	
Amaltheenton Formation	Jurassic	
Amaltheus Clay Formation	Jurassic	
Amaltheus Shale Formation	Jurassic	
Amden Formation	Cretaceous	
Angertal Formation	Devonian	
Angulatensandstein Formation	Jurassic	
Aptychus Beds Formation	Jurassic	
Arietenkalk Formation	Jurassic	
Aspidoides Bank Formation	Jurassic	
Auerswald coal seam Formation	Carboniferous	
Bausandstein Formation	Triassic	
Bebertal Formation	Permian	
Beckum Formation	Cretaceous	
Belemniten Formation	Jurassic	
Berching Formation	Jurassic	
Bergisch Gladbach Formation	Devonian	
Berthelsdorf Formation	Carboniferous	
Betakalkbank Formation	Jurassic	
Beyrichienkalk Formation	Silurian	
Bifurcata Oolith Formation	Jurassic	
Bochum Formation	Carboniferous	
Bohlen Formation	Paleogene	
Brandenberg Schichten Formation	Devonian	
Branderfleck Formation	Cretaceous	
Braunjura Group/Braunjura beta Formation	Jurassic	
Braunjura Group/Braunjura gamma Formation	Jurassic	
Brilon Massenkalk Formation	Devonian	
Brilon Shale Formation	Devonian	
Brongniarti-Pläner Formation	Cretaceous	
Buechel Formation	Devonian	
Buntsandstein	Triassic	
Buntsandstein Group/Bernburg Formation	Permian	
Buntsandstein Group/Buntsandstein Formation	Permian	
Buntsandstein Group/Calvoerde Formation	Permian	
Buntsandstein Group/Röt Formation	Triassic	
Buntsandstein Group/Solling Formation	Permian	
Buntsandstein Group/Volpriehausen Formation	Permian	
Buntsandstein Group/Wechsel Formation	Permian	
Bücheler Formation	Devonian	
Bückeberg Formation	Cretaceous	
Carboniferous Limestone Formation	Carboniferous	
Cuvieri-Pläner Formation	Cretaceous	
Cypridina Shale Formation	Carboniferous	
Cürten Formation	Devonian	
Dachhornstein Formation	Jurassic	
Doberg Formation	Paleogene	
Dreimühlen Formation	Devonian	
Dölzschen Formation	Cretaceous	
Eckfeld Formation	Devonian	
Eichstätt Formation	Jurassic	
Eifel Formation	Paleogene	
Elbingerode Reef Formation	Devonian	
Elligserbrink Shale Formation	Cretaceous	
Erbsloch Formation	Devonian	
Erbslochgrauwacke Formation	Devonian	
Erdbach Limestone Formation	Carboniferous	
Erfurt Formation	Triassic	
Essen Formation	Carboniferous	
Etroeungt Formation	Devonian	
Exter Formation	Triassic	
Falkenberg Group/Zwethau Formation	Cambrian	
Finnentrop Formation	Devonian	
Flammkohlenpartie Formation	Carboniferous	
Flinz Limestone Formation	Devonian	
Flöz Dreibänke Formation	Carboniferous	
Flöz Mittel Formation	Carboniferous	
Flöz Zweibänke Formation	Carboniferous	
Folkeslunda Limestone	Ordovician	
Freilingen Formation	Devonian	
Friiesenrather Schichten Formation	Devonian	
Fürstenau Formation	Paleogene	
Galgenberg Formation	Cambrian	
Gefell Formation	Devonian	
Gehlberg Formation	Paleogene	
Gehrener Formation	Permian	
Gehrener Schichten Formation	Carboniferous	
Geisental Formation	Jurassic	
Geisheck Formation	Carboniferous	
Gerhartsreiter Schichten Formation	Cretaceous	
Gildehausen Sandstone Formation	Cretaceous	
Glimmerton Formation	Neogene	
Gogoliner Schichten Formation	Triassic	
Goldlauter Formation	Permian	
Goldlauterer Formation	Permian	
Goldlauterer Schichten Formation	Permian	
Gosau Formation	Cretaceous	
Grafenberg Formation	Paleogene	
Green Series Formation	Jurassic	
Grensdolomite Formation	Triassic	
Grevenstein Formation	Devonian	
Grundflötz Formation	Carboniferous	
Grünsandstein Formation	Cretaceous	
Hallstatt Facies Group/Lercheck Limestone Formation	Triassic	
Hallstätterkalk Formation	Triassic	
Halstatt Formation	Triassic	
Hangenberg Kalk Formation	Carboniferous	
Hardegsen Formation	Triassic	
Hartmannshof Formation	Jurassic	
Hassberge Formation	Triassic	
Hauptmuschelkalk Formation	Triassic	
Hauptrogenstein Formation	Jurassic	
Heersum Formation	Jurassic	
Heilgenwalder Schichten Formation	Carboniferous	
Heiligenwald Formation	Carboniferous	
Heiligenwalder Formation	Carboniferous	
Heimburg Formation	Cretaceous	
Heusweiler Schichten Formation	Carboniferous	
Hils Conglomerate Formation	Cretaceous	
Hobräcke Formation	Devonian	
Hohenhöfer Formation	Devonian	
Honsel Formation	Devonian	
Honseler Schichten Formation	Devonian	
Horster Formation	Carboniferous	
Humphriesi Oolith Formation	Jurassic	
Hunsrück Slate	Devonian	
Hydrobienkalk Formation	Neogene	
Ibbenbüren Formation	Carboniferous	
Iberg Reef Formation	Devonian	
Ihmert Formation	Devonian	
Ilfelder Schichten Formation	Permian	
Ilmenau Formation	Permian	
Ilsenburg Formation	Cretaceous	
Impressamergel Formation	Jurassic	
Jeckenbach Formation	Permian	
Jena Formation	Triassic	
Junkerberg Formation	Devonian	
Jurensismergel Formation	Jurassic	
Kahlberg Formation	Devonian	
Kalchreuth Formation	Jurassic	
Kalkgrauwacke Formation	Devonian	
Kalmarsund Sandstone	Cambrian	
Kasseler Meeressand Formation	Paleogene	
Kaub Formation	Devonian	
Kerpen Formation	Devonian	
Keuper Formation	Triassic	
Keuper Group/Benkersandstein Formation	Triassic	
Keuper Group/Burgsandstein Formation	Triassic	
Keuper Group/Erfurt Formation	Triassic	
Keuper Group/Feuerletten Formation	Triassic	
Keuper Group/Gipskeuper Formation	Triassic	
Keuper Group/Lettenkeuper Formation	Triassic	
Keuper Group/Lettenkohle Formation	Triassic	
Keuper Group/Lower Keuper Formation	Triassic	
Keuper Group/Schilfsandstein Formation	Triassic	
Kirchstein Formation	Jurassic	
Klerf Formation	Devonian	
Kohlschneider Formation	Carboniferous	
Konglomeratbank 3 Formation	Triassic	
Korallenkalk Formation	Jurassic	
Korallenoolith Formation	Jurassic	
Kössen Formation	Triassic	
Kupferschiefer	Permian	
Kurrenberg Formation	Devonian	
Kürten Formation	Devonian	
Lagerdorf Formation	Cretaceous	
Langenfelde Formation	Neogene	
Latdorf Formation	Paleogene	
Lauch Formation	Devonian	
Lebach coal seam Formation	Carboniferous	
Lebacher Schichten Formation	Permian	
Leukersdorf Formation	Permian	
Liegende Bankkalk Formation	Jurassic	
Loogh Formation	Devonian	
Lower Alum Shale Formation	Carboniferous	
Lower Bänderschiefer Formation	Devonian	
Lower Buntsandstein Group/Bernburg Formation	Triassic	
Lower Dark Formation	Devonian	
Lower Gehrener Formation	Carboniferous	
Lower Keuper Formation	Triassic	
Lower Keuper Group/Erfurt Formation	Triassic	
Lower Kimmeridge marls Formation	Jurassic	
Lower Muschelkalk Formation	Triassic	
Lower Ottweieler layer Formation	Carboniferous	
Lower Ottweiler Schichten Formation	Carboniferous	
Lower Ottweiler Group/Göttelborn Formation	Carboniferous	
Lower Saarbrücker Formation	Carboniferous	
Löwenstein Formation	Triassic	
Macrocephalen Oolith Formation	Jurassic	
Malm Group/Münder Marl Formation	Jurassic	
Manebacher Formation	Permian	
Massenkalk Formation	Devonian	
Meeressande Formation	Paleogene	
Meisenheim Formation	Permian, Carboniferous	
Meissen Formation	Cretaceous	
Mergelstätten Formation	Jurassic	
Merlinge Schichten Formation	Triassic	
Messel Formation	Paleogene	
Middle Buntsandstein Formation	Triassic	
Middle Buntsandstein Group/Eichsfeld Sandstein Formation	Triassic	
Middle Buntsandstein Group/Hardegsen Formation	Triassic	
Middle Buntsandstein Group/Hardegsen Sandstone Formation	Triassic	
Middle Buntsandstein Group/Solling Formation	Triassic	
Middle Buntsandstein Group/Volpriehausen Formation	Triassic	
Middle Keuper Formation	Triassic	
Middle Keuper Formation	Triassic	
Middle Keuper Group/Arnstadt Formation	Triassic	
Middle Keuper Group/Hassberge Formation	Triassic	
Middle Keuper Group/Löwenstein Formation	Triassic	
Middle Keuper Group/Stuttgart Formation	Triassic	
Middle Keuper Group/Trossingen Formation	Triassic	
Middle Keuper Group/Weser Formation	Triassic	
Middle Kimmeridge marls Formation	Jurassic	
Middle Korallenoolith Formation	Jurassic	
Middle Loogh Formation	Devonian	
Molasse Group/Brackwater Molasse	Neogene	
Molasse Group/Lower Freshwater Molasse	Neogene, Paleogene	
Molasse Group/Upper Freshwater Molasse	Neogene	
Muschelkalk Group/Ceratites Beds Formation	Triassic	
Muschelkalk Group/Hauptmuschelkalk Formation	Triassic	
Muschelkalk Group/Jena Formation	Triassic	
Muschelkalk Group/Lower Hauptmuschelkalk Formation	Triassic	
Muschelkalk Group/Meissner Formation	Triassic	
Muschelkalk Group/Meißner Formation	Triassic	
Muschelkalk Group/Schaumkalk Formation	Triassic	
Muschelkalk Group/Trochitenkalk Formation	Triassic	
Muschelkalk Group/Wellenkalk Formation	Triassic	
Mörnsheim Formation	Jurassic	
Mörsheim Formation	Jurassic	
Mühlenberg Formation	Devonian	
Neckars Formation	Germany	
Neichnerberg Formation	Devonian	
Nellenköpfchen Formation	Devonian	
Netzkater Formation	Permian	
Neuburg Formation	Jurassic	
Neuburger Weiß Formation	Cretaceous	
Neuwieder Becken 1 Formation	Paleogene	
Neuwieder Becken 2a Formation	Paleogene	
Neuwieder Becken 2b Formation	Paleogene	
Neuwieder Becken 3 Formation	Paleogene	
Neuwieder Becken 4 Formation	Paleogene	
Neuwieder Becken 5 Formation	Paleogene	
Neuwieder Becken 6 Formation	Paleogene	
Neuwieder Becken 7a Formation	Paleogene	
Neuwieder Becken 7b Formation	Paleogene	
Neuwieder Becken 8 Formation	Paleogene	
Newberria Formation	Devonian	
Nohn Formation	Devonian	
Nusplingen Limestone Formation	Jurassic	
Nusplingen Plattenkalk Formation	Jurassic	
Oberer Hauptmuschelkalk Formation	Triassic	
Oberer Travertin Formation	Germany	
Oberer Travertin I Formation	Germany	
Oberer Travertin II Formation	Germany	
Oberhäslich Formation	Cretaceous	
Oberhofer Formation	Permian	
Oberhonsel Formation	Devonian	
Odernheim Formation	Carboniferous	
Odershausen Formation	Devonian	
Oerlinghausen Formation	Cretaceous	
Ohlsbach Formation	Carboniferous	
Opalinus Clay Formation	Jurassic	
Opalinuston Formation	Jurassic	
Ornatenton Formation	Jurassic	
Orthocrinus Formation	Devonian	
Ottweiler Formation	Carboniferous	
Ottweiler Layers Formation	Carboniferous	
Ottweiler Schichten Formation	Carboniferous	
Ottweiler Stufe Formation	Carboniferous	
Painten Formation	Jurassic	
Papierschiefer Formation	Jurassic	
Parkinsoni Oolith Formation	Jurassic	
Petite Formation	Carboniferous	
Plattenkalk Formation	Devonian	
Plattenkalk Group/Bücheler Schichten Formation	Devonian	
Posidonia Shale	Jurassic	
Purbek Kalk Formation	Cretaceous	
Ramsau Dolomite Formation	Triassic	
Randeck Maar Formation	Neogene	
Refrath Formation	Devonian	
Regensburger Grünsandstein Formation	Cretaceous	
Rennertshofen Formation	Jurassic	
Reudelstrerz Formation	Devonian	
Rhaet Hauptton Formation	Triassic	
Rheinisches Schiefergebirge Formation	Devonian	
Rodert Formation	Devonian	
Roteisenstein Formation	Devonian	
Rothaeuser Grauwacke Formation	Devonian	
Rotliegend Group/Döhlen Formation	Permian	
Rotliegend Group/Lauterecken Formation	Permian	
Rotliegend Group/Niederhäslich Formation	Permian	
Rotliegend Group/Tambach Formation	Permian	
Rott Formation	Paleogene	
Rügen Chalk	Cretaceous	
Rupel Formation	Paleogene	
Rußkohlenflötz Formation	Carboniferous	
Rögling Formation	Jurassic	
Röt Formation	Triassic	
Rüssingen Formation	Neogene	
Saarbrücken Group/Luisenthal Formation	Carboniferous	
Saarbrückenisches Kohlengebirge Formation	Carboniferous	
Saarbrücken Formation	Carboniferous	
Sandersdorf Formation	Carboniferous	
Saxler Formation	Devonian	
Scaphiten-Pläner Formation	Cretaceous	
Schrambach Formation	Cretaceous	
Schrattenkalk Formation	Cretaceous	
Schreyeralm Formation	Triassic	
Schwelm Formation	Devonian	
Schwelm Limestone Formation	Devonian	
Selscheid Formation	Devonian	
Selztal Group/Alzey Formation	Paleogene	
Sengenthal Formation	Jurassic	
Septarienton Formation	Paleogene	
Siegen Formation	Devonian	
Siegener Schichten Formation	Devonian	
Siphonia Marl Formation	Cretaceous	
Solling Formation	Triassic	
Solnhofen Formation	Jurassic	
Sprockhoeveler Formation	Carboniferous	
Stadtfeld Formation	Devonian	
Sternberg Formation	Paleogene	
Stockletten Formation	Paleogene	
Strehlen Formation	Cretaceous	
Stringocephalus limestone Formation	Devonian	
Strohgelbe Kalke Formation	Triassic	
Stromberg Formation	Cretaceous	
Strubberg Formation	Jurassic	
Stuttgart Formation	Triassic	
Stöppel Shale Formation	Devonian	
Subway Formation	Cretaceous	
Söhlde Formation	Cretaceous	
Tambacher Formation	Permian	
Thermalsinterkalk Formation	Neogene	
Torleite Formation	Jurassic	
Torringen Formation	Devonian	
Trochitenkalk Formation	Triassic	
Trossingen Formation	Triassic	
Untere Ottweiler Schichten Formation	Carboniferous	
Untere Saarbrücker Schichten Formation	Carboniferous	
Unterer Korallenoolith Formation	Jurassic	
Unterer Travertin Formation	Germany	
Unterhonsel Formation	Devonian	
Upper Buntsandstein Formation	Triassic	
Upper Buntsandstein Group/Plattensandstein Group / Rötton Formation	Triassic	
Upper Buntsandstein Group/Röt Formation	Triassic	
Upper Buntsandstein Group/Röttone Formation	Triassic	
Upper Dark Formation	Devonian	
Upper Freshwater Molasse	Neogene	
Upper Hagen Beds Formation	Carboniferous	
Upper Hauptmuschelkalk Formation	Triassic	
Upper Keuper Formation	Triassic	
Upper Keuper Group/Exter Formation	Triassic	
Upper Keuper Group/Feuerletten Formation	Triassic	
Upper Keuper Group/Rhätkeuper Formation	Triassic	
Upper Kimmeridge marls Formation	Jurassic	
Upper Kuseler Shale Formation	Permian	
Upper Loogh Formation	Devonian	
Upper Muschelkalk Formation	Triassic	
Upper Raibl Beds Formation	Triassic	
Upper Rhaetian Reef Limestone Formation	Triassic	
Upper Saarbrücker layer Formation	Carboniferous	
Upper Saarbrücker Shale Formation	Carboniferous	
Usseltal Formation	Jurassic	
Varians Oolith Formation	Jurassic	
Velbert Formation	Devonian	
Ville Formation	Neogene	
Vogtendorf Formation	Ordovician	
Waderner Schichten Formation	Permian	
Wallen Slate Formation	Devonian	
Wallersheim Formation	Devonian	
Weißjura Formation	Jurassic	
Wellenkalk Formation	Triassic	
Wellheim Formation	Cretaceous	
Werder Formation	Neogene	
Werkkalk Formation	Jurassic	
Werra Formation Formation	Permian	
Werra Group/Copper Shale Formation	Permian	
Werra Group/Copper Shale Formation	Permian	
Werra Group / Copper Shale and Zechstein Limestone Formation	Permian	
Werrakarbonat Formation	Permian	
Werra Group/Zechstein Limestone Formation	Permian	
Wetterstein Formation	Triassic	
Wettin Formation	Carboniferous	
Wettiner Formation	Carboniferous	
Wettiner Schichten Formation	Carboniferous	
White Chalk Formation	Cretaceous	
Wiedenest Formation	Devonian	
Wilder Schiefer Formation	Jurassic	
Wohlgeschichtete Kalk Formation	Jurassic	
Wullen Formation	Cretaceous	
Zechstein Formation	Permian	
Zechstein Limestone Formation	Permian	
Zechstein Salzton Formation	Permian	
Zechstein Group/Aller Formation	Permian	
Zechstein Group/Leine Formation	Permian	
Zechstein Group/Stassfurt Formation	Permian	
Zechstein Group/Werra Formation	Permian	
Ziegelschiefer Formation	Carboniferous	
Zwetau Formation	Cambrian	
Zwickau Formation	Carboniferous	

== See also ==
- Lists of fossiliferous stratigraphic units in Europe
- Geology of Germany
