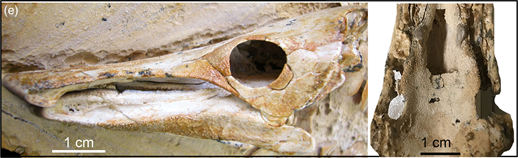
- Fossil skull of G. whitei

Scientific classification
- Kingdom: Animalia
- Phylum: Chordata
- Class: Dipnoi
- Family: †Holodontidae
- Genus: †Griphognathus; Gross, 1956

Species
- See text

= Griphognathus =

Griphognathus Temporal range: Late Devonian (Givetian to Frasnian)

Extinct genus of fishes

Griphognathus (from Greek: γρίφος grífos 'riddle') and Greek: γνάθος gnáthos 'jaw') is an extinct genus of marine lungfish from the mid-to-late Devonian period of Europe and Australia.

Griphognathus was a specialized lungfish, about 60 centimetres (24 in) long, with an elongated snout. The lower jaw and palate were lined with tooth-like denticles. Like all other lungfish, its skin was covered by overlapping scales, and it had an asymmetrical tail.

The following species are placed in this genus:

- †G. minutidens Gross, 1956 - late Givetian of Latvia (Lode Formation)
- †G. sculpta Schultze, 1969 - Givetian of Germany (Torringen Formation)
- †G. whitei Miles, 1977 - Frasnian of Western Australia (Gogo Formation)

However, Friedman noted major morphological differences between G. whitei and the other two species, and suggested that G. whitei may be better classified into its own genus. All three members of Griphognathus appear to be closely allied with Soederberghia.
