= Korallenoolith Formation =

Geologic formation in Germany

- Stratigraphic range: Oxfordian
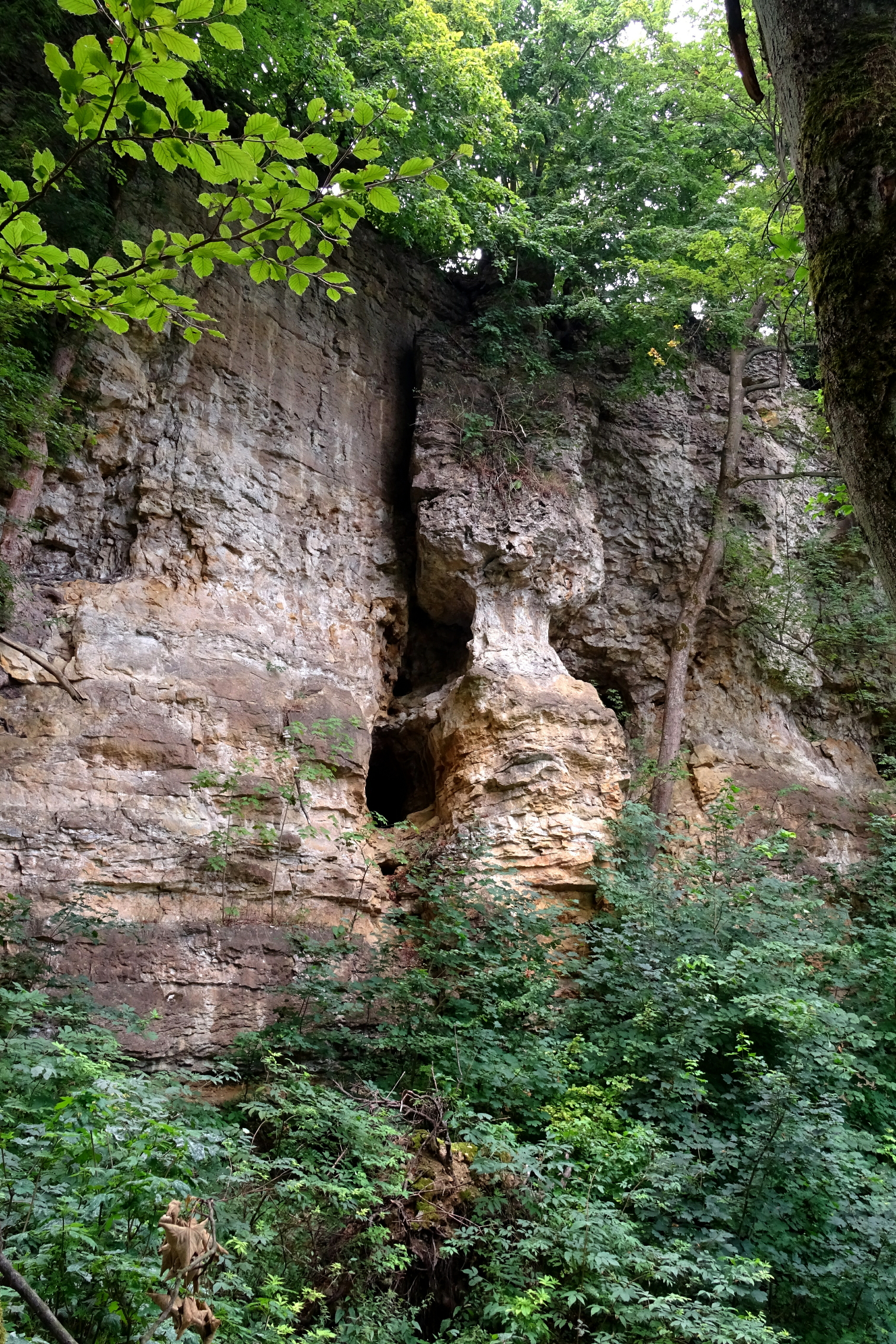
- Naturschutzgebiet Saupark
- Type: Formation
- Underlies: Süntel Formation
- Overlies: Heersum Formation
- Thickness: ~50 m (160 ft)

Lithology
- Primary: Oolitic limestone

Location
- Country: Germany

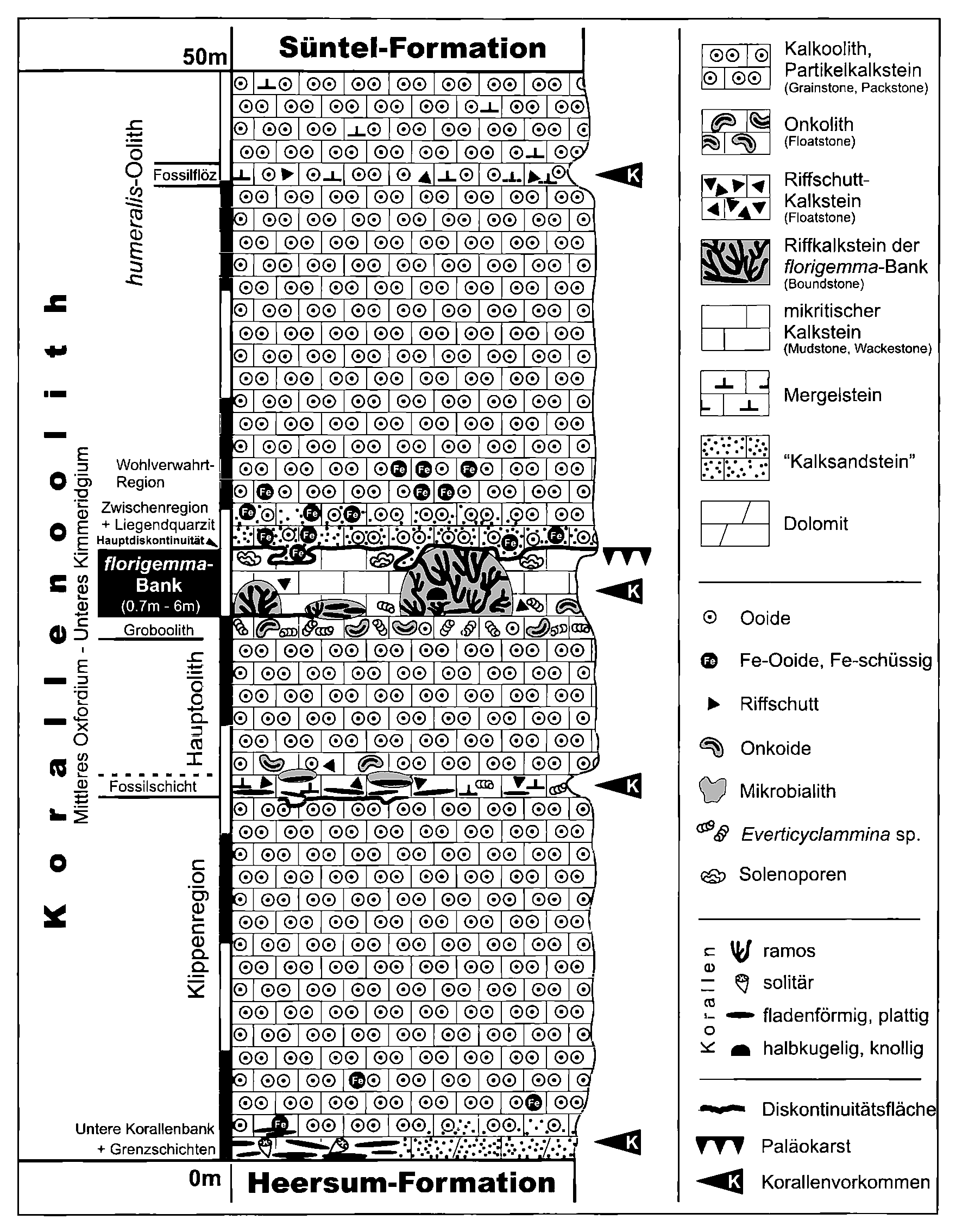
Stratigraphic column

The Korallenoolith Formation is a geologic formation in Germany. It preserves fossils dating back to the Jurassic period. It predominantly consists of oolitic limestone.

== See also ==
- List of fossiliferous stratigraphic units in Germany
