= Siegen (disambiguation) =

Siegen may refer to:

- Siegen
- Siegen, Bas-Rhin
- Siegen Formation, a geologic formation in Germany

== See also ==
- Nassau-Siegen, a principality within the Holy Roman Empire
