= Misthodotes =

Misthodotes Temporal range: Asselian–Wuchiapingian

Scientific classification
- Domain: Eukaryota
- Kingdom: Animalia
- Phylum: Arthropoda
- Class: Insecta
- (unranked): Panephemeroptera
- (unranked): Ephemerida
- (unranked): †Permoplectoptera
- Family: †Misthodotidae
- Genus: †Misthodotes; Sellards, 1909

Type species
- Dromeus obtusus Sellards, 1907

Synonyms
- Dromeus Sellards, 1907 (preoccupied); Eudoter Tillyard, 1936

Extinct genus of stem-group mayflies

Misthodotes is an extinct genus of stem-group mayflies which existed during the Permian of what is now the United States, Russia and Germany. It was first described under the name Dromeus by Elias Howard Sellards in 1907. It was found that this name had already been used for another genus, so Sellards renamed his genus to Misthodotes in 1909. Unlike the adults of modern mayflies, which have non-functional mouthparts and are unable to feed, adults of Misthodotes had functional mouthparts for chewing.

== Species ==
- †Misthodotes biguttatus Tillyard, 1932 – Wellington Formation, Kansas, Early Permian, Artinskian
- †Misthodotes delicatulus (Tillyard, 1936) – Wellington Formation, Kansas, Early Permian, Artinskian
- †Misthodotes dubius Sinitshenkova, 2013 – Poldarsa Formation, Russia, Late Permian, Wuchiapingian
- †Misthodotes edmundsi Carpenter, 1979 – Wellington Formation, Oklahoma, Early Permian, Artinskian
- †Misthodotes obtusus (Sellards, 1907) – Wellington Formation, Kansas, Early Permian, Artinskian
- †Misthodotes ovalis Tillyard, 1932 – Wellington Formation, Kansas, Early Permian, Artinskia
- †Misthodotes sharovi Tshernova, 1965 – Koshelevka Formation, Russia, Early Permian, Kungurian
- †Misthodotes stapfi Kinzelbach and Lutz, 1984 – Jeckenbach Formation, Germany, Early Permian, Asselian
- †Misthodotes tshernovae Sinitshenkova & Vassilenko, 2012 – Poldarsa Formation, Russia, Late Permian, Wuchiapingian
- †Misthodotes visherensis Novokshonov, Ivanov & Aristov, 2002 – Solikamsk Formation, Russia, Early Permian, Kungurian
- †Misthodotes zalesskyi Tshernova, 1965 – Koshelevka Formation, Russia, Early Permian, Kungurian
