= Luisenthal Mine =

Former coal mine in near Völklingen, Germany

Coordinates: 49°15′02″N 6°54′18″E

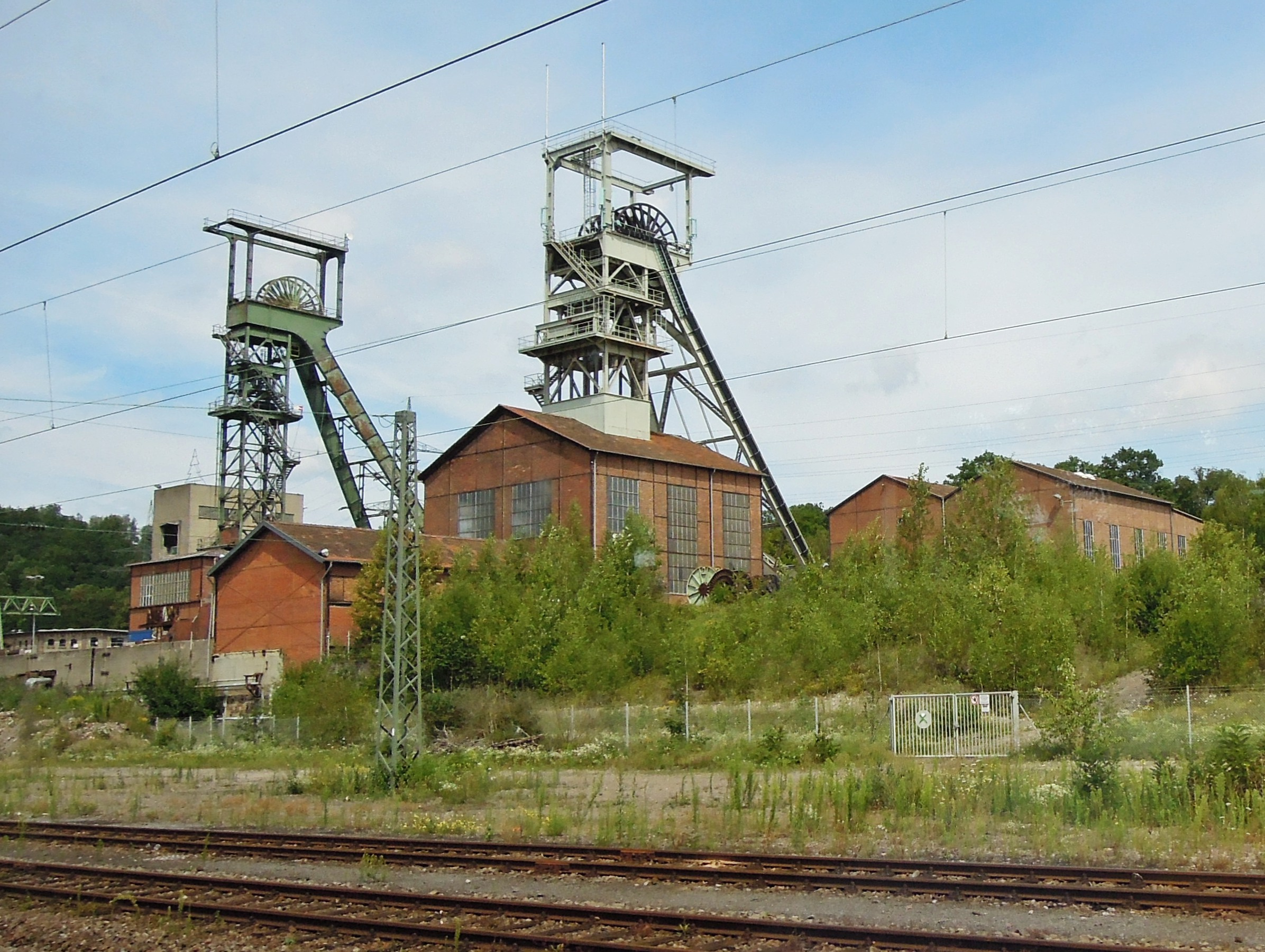
Headframe

The Luisenthal Mine was a coal mine near Völklingen. The mine was known as the site of the largest mine accident in the history of the German Federal Republic, when 299 miners died on 7 February 1962.

== 1962 mine disaster ==
On 7 February 1962 a methane explosion occurred after the opening of a methane-containing cavern in the Alsbach field. This triggered a larger coal dust explosion with devastating effects. 284 workers were killed, making this the greatest mining catastrophe in the history of the Saarland coal mining area.

== See also ==
- Luisenthal Formation
