= Ida von Boxberg =

German archaeologist (1806–1893)

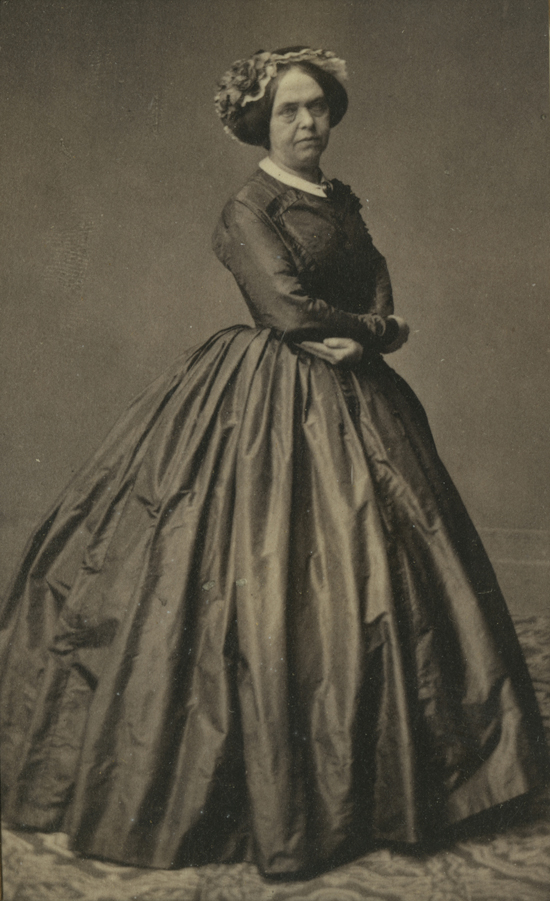
- First active Saxon female archaeologist in Saxony, Germany, and France.
- Born: 23 August 1806; Jüterbog (Brandenburg)
- Died: 1 November 1893 (aged 87); Zschorna Castle near Radeburg
- Burial place: Dobra (Thiendorf)
- Occupation: Archaeologist
- Known for: Archaeological finds in France and Germany

Ida Wilhelmina von Boxberg (1806 – 1893) was a German-born archaeologist, baroness and the first female archaeologist of Saxony, who lived and worked in France for many decades. She was known for facilitating the exchange of scholarly archaeological information among other researchers in France and Germany.

== Biography ==
Von Boxberg was born in Jüterbog, the fifth of nine children of First Lieutenant and Adjutant of the Infantry Regiment Karl Gottlob von Boxberg (1769–1825) and his wife Henriette Wilhelmine Sichart von Sichartshoff (1774–1851). When her father was transferred to Dresden, Ida spent her childhood and youth there. Thanks to her family's elevated social standing, she received an excellent education. She learned French at an early age and traveled to France several times. During the first decades of her life, she enjoyed art, watercolor painting and stained glass, but then became involved in archaeology and the study of prehistoric periods.

In 1837, she met the family of Henri de La Rochelambert (1789–1863) in Berlin. She became friends with his wife, the Marquise Apollonie de La Rochelambert (1802–1893), née de Bruges-Montgommery. In 1839, Ida was hired as governess for the family's three daughters, Apollonie (1825–1904), Clotilde (1829–1884) and Staouélie (1832–1911). Ida von Boxberg accompanied the La Rochelambert family throughout France and lived with them in their various residences: in Paris, at the Château de la Rochelambert near Saint-Paulien (Haute-Loire), at the Château de Thévalles (which was only 3 km from the Saulges caves") in Chémeré-le-Roi (Mayenne) and at the Château de Saint-Priest-de-Gimel (Corrèze). After the marriage of the youngest daughter in 1853, and even during the Franco-Prussian War of 1870, von Boxberg remained on good terms with the La Rochelambert family and continued to live and work alongside them for many years.

=== Archaeological work ===
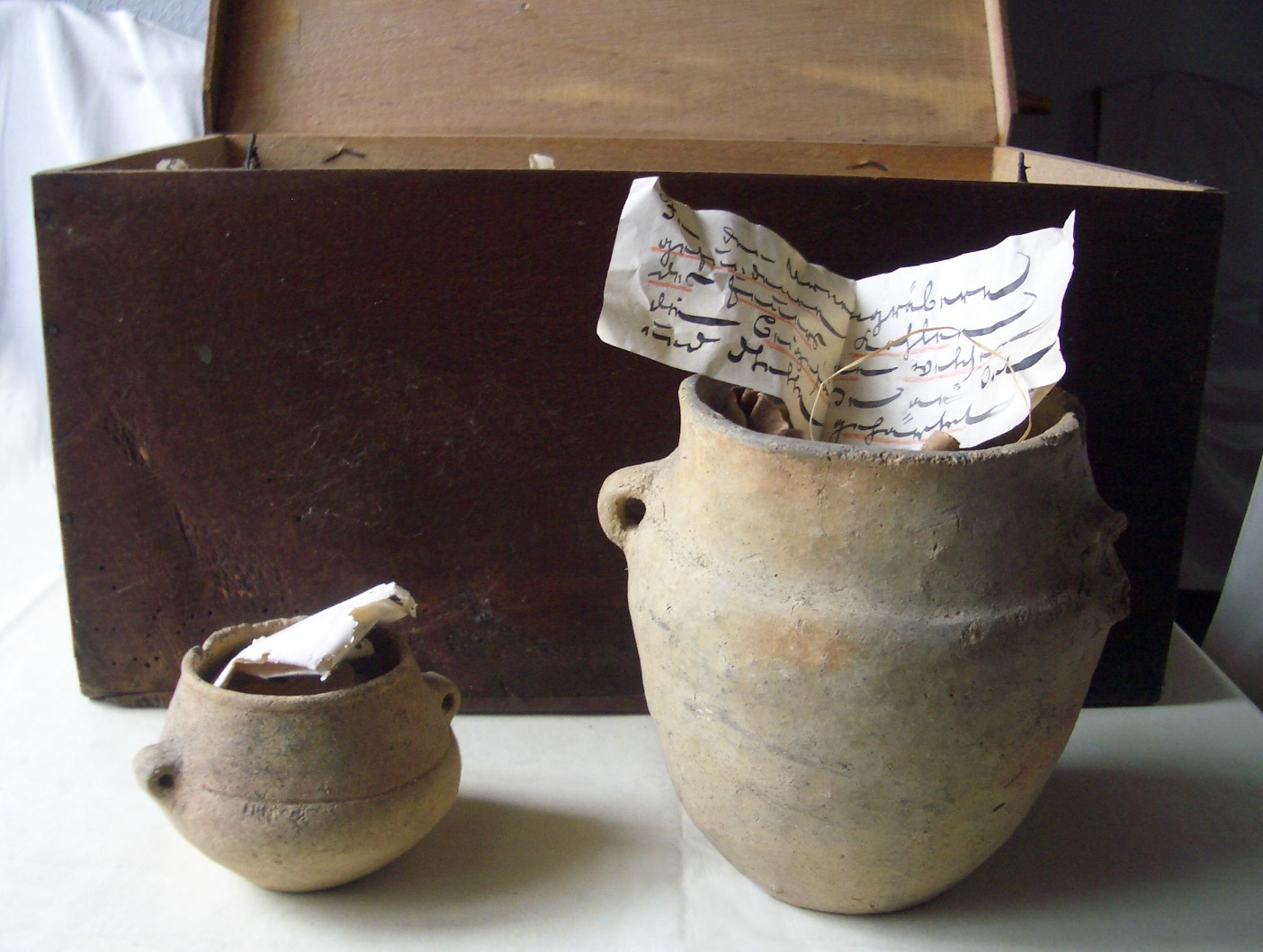
Clay vessels with handwritten find information by Ida von Boxberg from the Alexander Witting Collection

Even though women of that time were not allowed to study regularly at many European universities, von Boxberg began researching prehistoric periods on her own initiative. She carried out her first excavations with her brother Friedrich August between 1858 and 1860 on the grounds of Zschorna Castle, which he owned. By the time she joined the Rochelambert family, she was an experienced archaeologist having already carried out excavations in France including in Corrèze, Haute-Loire, Maine-et-Loire.

Between 1873 and 1874, she conducted research at the Rochefort Cave and the Cave à la Chèvre (Goat's Cave) in the Erve Valley. There, she documented the geographical conditions using detailed watercolors: the river's course, the buildings, the cave entrances, and the locations where objects were discovered. Today, these caves are part of the Saulges Caves network. Another cave, near the Château de Thévalles, attracted Ida's attention in 1882.

On 29 June 1870, von Boxberg was accepted as a member of the Dresden Natural Sciences Society and became part of the Prehistoric Research Section, which had only been founded the previous year. In 1873, von Boxberg was accepted as a member of the famous German Society of Anthropology, Ethnology and Prehistory in Berlin. On 31 May 1877, she was appointed an honorary member of the International Society for Anthropology and Prehistory.

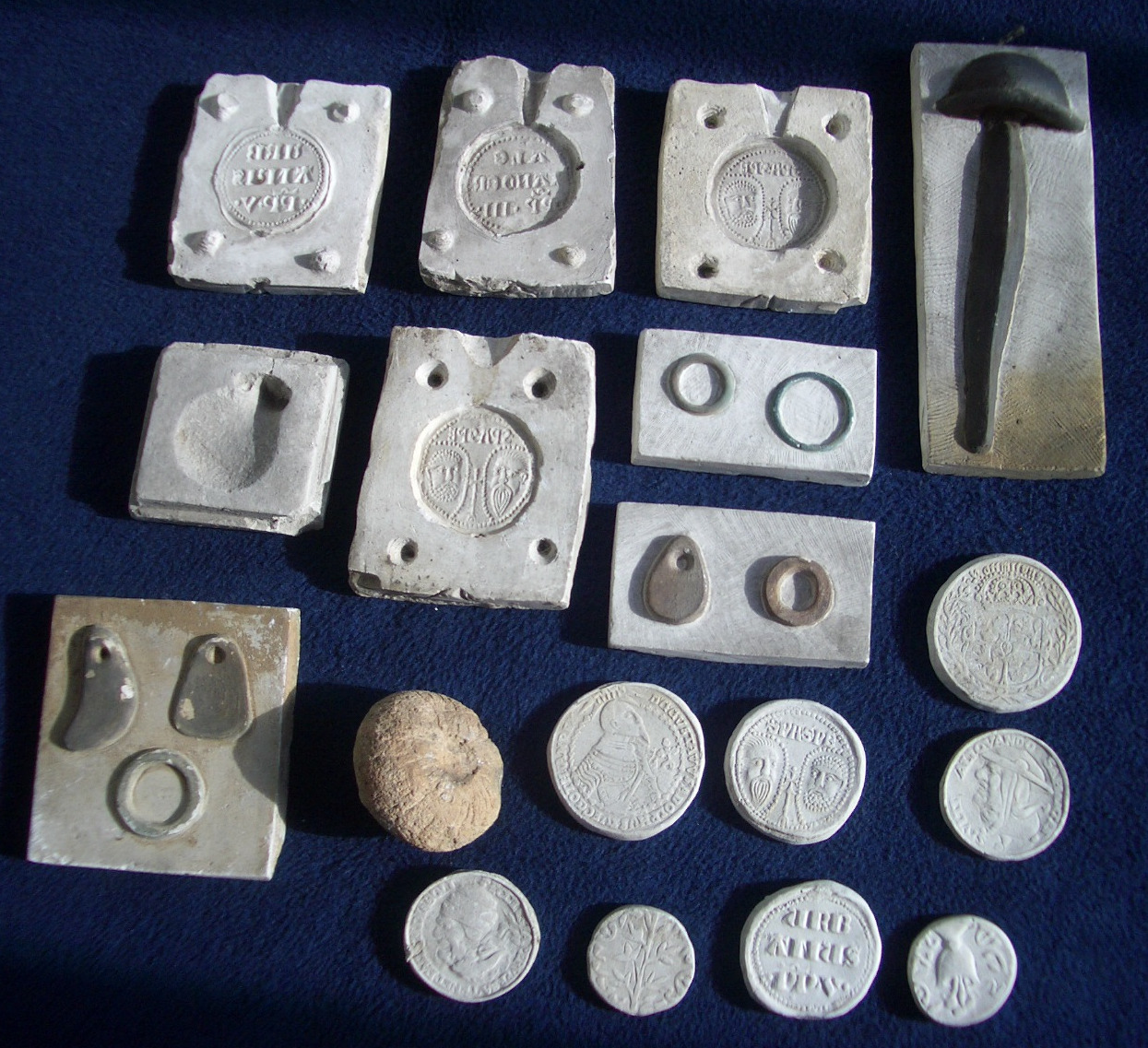
Plaster Casts and Molds by Ida von Boxberg from the Collection of Alexander Witting

In his first year at the Royal Mineralogy and Geology Museum in Dresden, director Hanns Bruno Geinitz reported on fossils from a chalk rock deposit near Angers (Maine-et-Loire), France, which von Boxberg had donated to the Museum. A particular fossil of palm wood, previously unknown, bears her name: Palmacites Boxbergae.

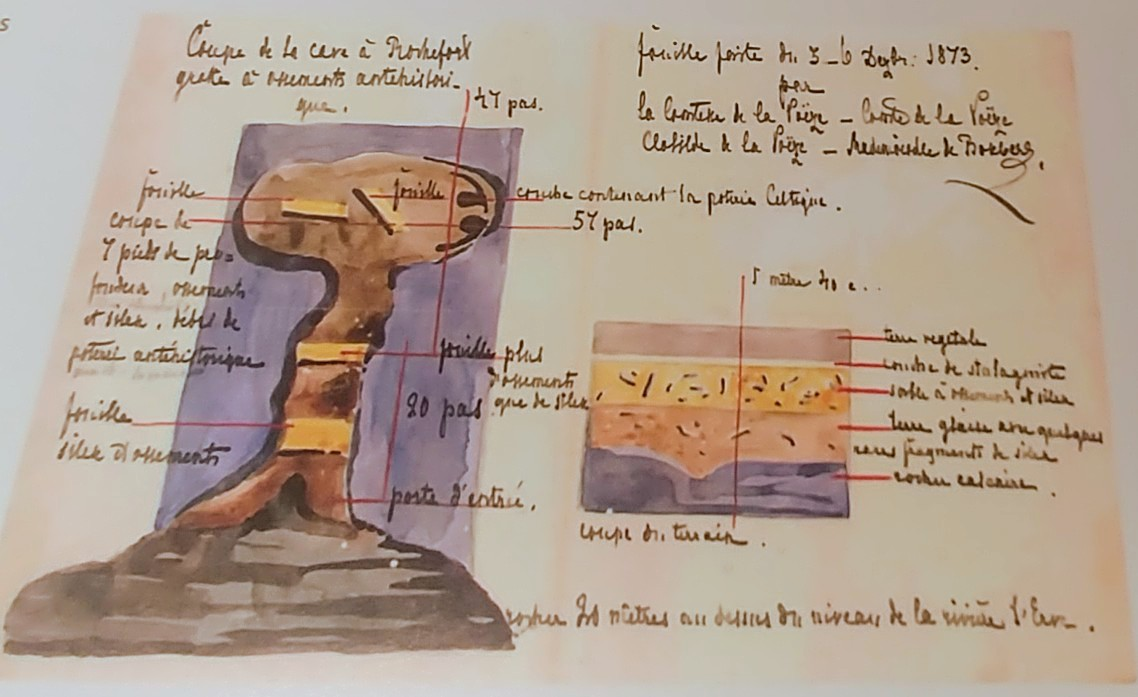
Excavation Notes: Ida von Boxberg, Cave at Rochefort, 1873

In 1880, she proved that Ice Age hunters had a resting place in a sandpit near the Grosswelka manor (near Bautzen). This estate had been owned by Ida's brother, Ottomar Robert von Boxberg (1811–1884), since 1875. She created a small exhibition of her finds in the manor's west wing.

Even after she returned to Germany from France, von Boxberg continued to participate in excavations of prehistoric sites. With Johannes Deichmüller, she observed cremation graves from the Hallstatt period in 1886 on the Knochenberg near Niederrödern, and in 1890 the urnfields of Freitelsdorf. At Dobra, she explored cremation graves dating from the end of the Bronze Age, and near Tauscha, a necropolis in a forested area, found objects also dating to the Bronze Age.

Based on the existing artifacts, scholars have concluded that von Boxberg conducted additional research in Saxony after finding objects from the gravel pits of Großwelka and Kleinwelka, funerary inventories from Kleinsaubernitz and rocks from Zöblitz and Oberhäslich in her collections.

=== Donations ===
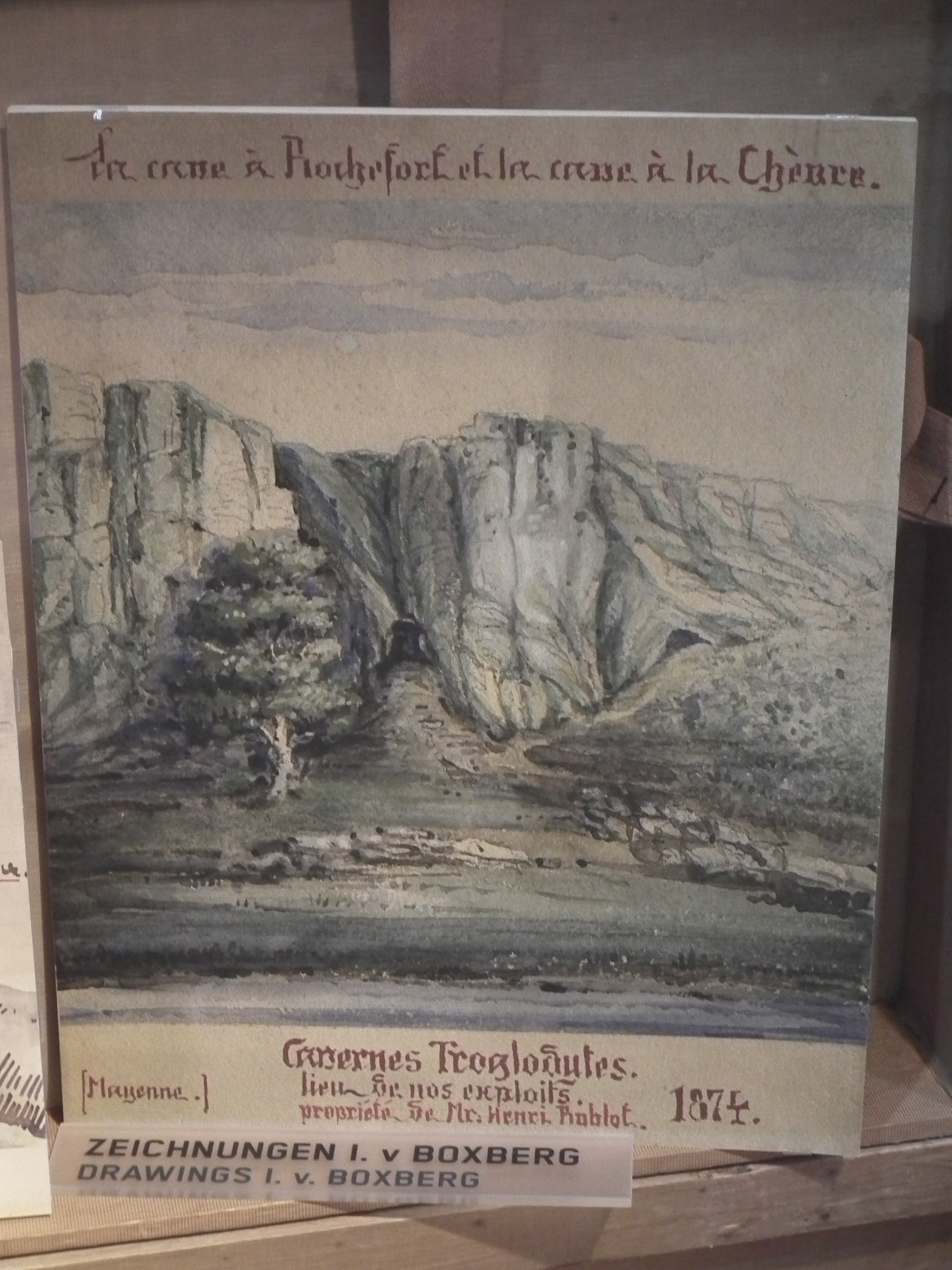
State Museum of Archaeology, Chemnitz

In 1871, von Boxberg entrusted to the Royal Museum of Mineralogy and Geology her finds from the burial pits of Troussepoil (near Bernard in Vendée), which she had already reported to the Natural Science Society the previous year.

In 1883, she donated to the Dresden Cabinet of Coins and Medals her medieval collection of seals, badges and workers' marks, which she had collected in the Loire region near Orléans.

She bequeathed a collection of fossils and minerals and another prehistoric collection to King Albert I of Saxony in 1877, which he passed on to the Royal Mineralogy Museum in Dresden and the Ethnology Museum in Leipzig.

Ida von Boxberg brought her extensive collection of artifacts found during her travels abroad to Zschorna Castle. Besides fossils, minerals, and rocks, there were also samples of grain and fabric from the stilt houses of Robenhausen on Lake Pfäffikon in the canton of Zurich, clothing from the Middle Ages and the modern period, flint tools from Grand-Pressigny, and human, horse and reindeer bones found in the vicinity of Thévalles. After the sale of Zschorna Castle in 1936, the collections were transferred to the school in Würschnitz (near Thiendorf). In 1967, the Dresden State Museum of Prehistory acquired the collections. The Crozatier Museum in Le Puy-en-Velay (near the La Rochelambert family castle) houses stone axes and notes belonging to von Boxberg. In 2008, the granddaughter of Dresden-born mathematician Alexander Witting donated a large number of her discoveries to the museum: her grandfather was a member of the Dresden Natural Sciences Society and participated in the excavations. The pottery vessels and fragments, bones, plaster casts and molds of the archaeological finds, as well as stone tools and minerals, were labeled in Ida von Boxberg's distinctive handwriting, indicating that they were collected by her, or at least under her supervision. Other objects from her extensive collection are held within the collections of private French and German institutions.

=== Last days ===
Ida von Boxberg never married and spent most of her adult life in France, but she still visited Germany many times. She finally returned permanently to Saxony, Germany, at the age of 77. She spent her last years within the close circle of her family inspiring lively scientific and artistic activity. She died on 1 November 1893, at the von Boxberg estate of Zschorna Castle near Radeberg. She was buried 4 November in the family vault in the cemetery of the Evangelical church in the nearby town of Dobra (Thiendorf).

== Legacy ==
- She named a fossilized palm species after herself that she discovered, "Palmacites Boxbergae."
- Her papers are held at the Saxon State Archives in files labeled "14011 Estate of Ida von Boxberg."

== Selected publications ==
- Ida von Boxberg, The well diggers of Troussepoil in the Département de la Vendée. Proceedings of the Natural Science Society ISIS in Dresden 7–9, 1871, 129–134.
- Ida von Boxberg, Continuation of the excavations in the Rochefort cave. Proceedings of the ISIS Natural Science Society in Dresden 1–3, 1874, 146–149.
- Ida von Boxberg, On settlements from the Rentier period in the Mayenne Department. Proceedings of the Natural Science Society ISIS in Dresden 1–3, 1877, 1–5.
