= Wechsel (disambiguation) =

Wechsel is a mountain range in Austria.

Wechsel may also refer to:

- The word for change in German
- Wechsel Pass, mountainpass in the Alps
- Wechsel Formation, geologic formation in Germany
- Grammatischer Wechsel, linguistics term in German
- Leon-Oumar Wechsel (born 2005), German footballer
