= Gladbach =

Gladbach may refer to:

- the former name of Mönchengladbach, a city in North Rhine-Westphalia, Germany
  - Borussia Mönchengladbach, a football club in Mönchengladbach
- the former name of Bergisch Gladbach, a city in North Rhine-Westphalia, Germany
- Gladbach, Rhineland-Palatinate, a municipality in the district Bernkastel-Wittlich, Rhineland-Palatinate, Germany
- Gladbach, a suburban administrative district of Neuwied, Rhineland-Palatinate, Germany
- Gladbach (Niers), a river of North Rhine-Westphalia, Germany
- Gladbach Formation, a geologic formation in Germany
