= Zwethau Formation =

Geologic formation in Germany

- Stratigraphic range: Cambrian Stage 3 (Atdabanian)
- Type: Formation
- Unit of: Falkenberg Group
- Sub-units: Upper & Lower Torgau members

Lithology
- Primary: Limestone

Location
- Coordinates: 51.6°N 13.6°E
- Approximate paleocoordinates: 38.1°S 106.6°E
- Region: Brandenburg
- Country: Germany
- Zwethau Formation (Germany) Zwethau Formation (Brandenburg)

The Zwethau Formation is a geologic formation in Germany. It preserves fossils dating back to the Cambrian period.

== Fossil content ==
The following fossils have been reported from the formation:

- Afiacyathus paracompositus
- Coscinocyathus germanicus
- Dictyocyathus stipatus
- Erismacoscinus tainius
- Erismacoscinus aff. primus
- Protopharetra dissuta
- P. gemmata
- Proaulopora cf. glabra
- Afiacyathus sp.
- Botomaella sp.
- Coscinocyathus sp.
- Epiphyton sp.
- Erismacoscinus sp.
- Kordephyton sp.
- Renalcis sp.
- Diplostraca indet.
- Hyolitha indet.
- Trilobita indet.

== See also ==
- List of fossiliferous stratigraphic units in Germany
