= Calvoerde Formation =

German geological formation

- Stratigraphic range: Permian
- Type: Formation

Location
- Country: Germany

The Calvoerde Formation is a geologic formation that is situated in Germany. It preserves fossils dating back to the Permian period.

== See also ==
- List of fossiliferous stratigraphic units in Germany
