= Vogtendorf Formation =

Geologic formation in Germany

- Stratigraphic range: Tremadocian
- Type: Formation
- Underlies: Gösmes Formation

Lithology
- Primary: Tuff

Location
- Coordinates: 50.2°N 11.4°E
- Approximate paleocoordinates: 52.3°S 94.2°E
- Region: Bavaria
- Country: Germany

Type section
- Named for: Vogtendorf, Bavaria
- Named by: Sdzuy et al.
- Year defined: 2001
- Vogtendorf Formation (Germany)

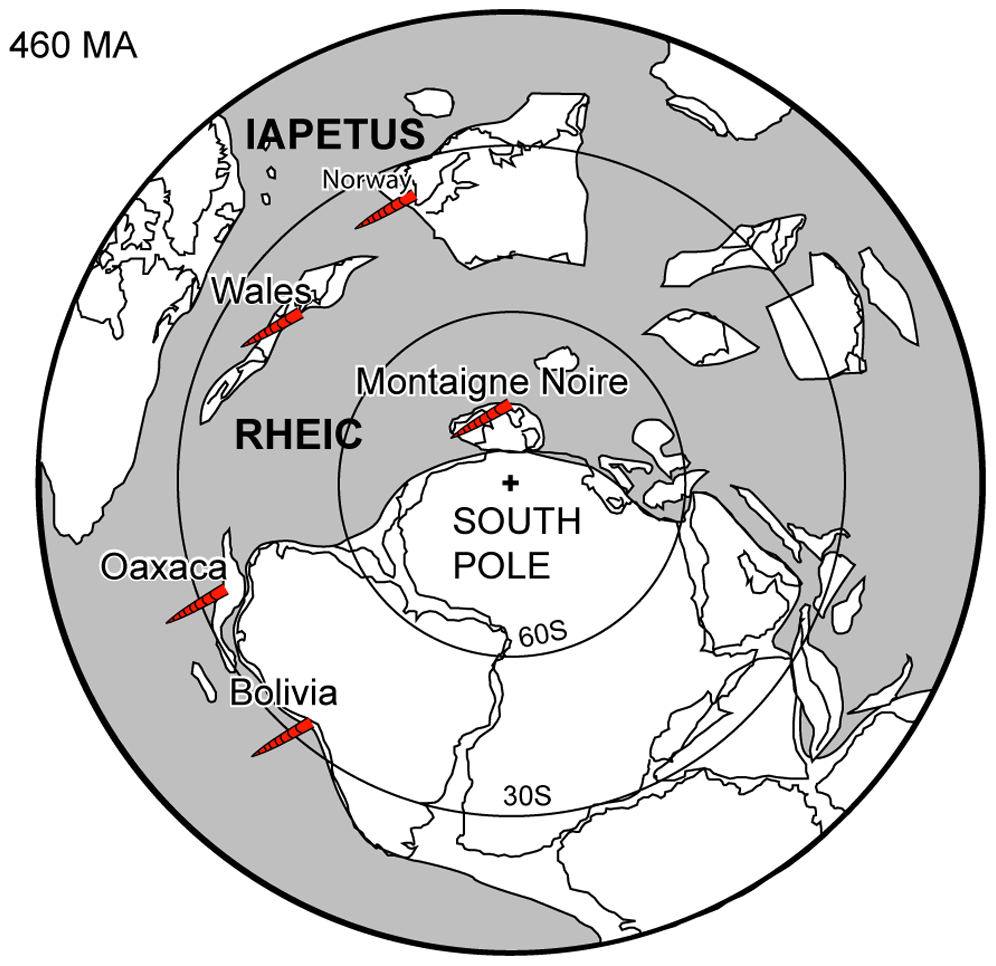
Paleogeography of the late Middle Ordovician. The Vogtendorf Formation was deposited around 52°S

The Vogtendorf Formation, in 2001 redefined from the older name Randschiefer-Serie by Sdzuy et al., is a geologic formation in Bavaria, Germany. It preserves fossils dating back to the Tremadocian stage of the Ordovician period.

== Fossil content ==
Trilobites

- Agerina alkleini
- Echinosphaerites henkleini
- Macrocystella greilingi
- Parapilekia vogtendorfensis
- Poramborthis vonhorstigi
- Ranorthis franconica

Rhynchonellata

- Orthida
  - Giraldiellidae
    - Kvania mergli

== See also ==
- List of fossiliferous stratigraphic units in Germany
- Folkeslunda Limestone
