= Kalmarsund Sandstone =

Geologic formation

- Stratigraphic range: Cambrian
- Type: Formation

Location
- Country: Germany

The Kalmarsund Sandstone is a geologic formation in Germany. It preserves fossils dating back to the Cambrian period.

== See also ==
- List of fossiliferous stratigraphic units in Germany
