= Neckars Formation =

- Stratigraphic range: Pleistocene; ~2.6–0.011 Ma
- Type: Formation

Location
- Coordinates: 49.4°N 8.7°E
- Approximate paleocoordinates: 49.4°N 8.6°E
- Region: Heidelberg
- Country: Germany
- Neckars Formation (Germany)

The Neckars Formation is a Pleistocene geologic formation in Germany. In the Sackdillinger Cave, it preserves fossils of the frogs Rana temporaria and Bufo sp. and the bear Ursus sackdillingensis.

== See also ==
- List of fossiliferous stratigraphic units in Germany
