= Ahbach Formation =

Geologic formation in Germany

- Stratigraphic range: Eifelian-Givetian; ~390–385 Ma
- Type: Formation
- Sub-units: Hallert & Olifant members

Lithology
- Primary: Limestone
- Other: Mudstone

Location
- Coordinates: 50.3°N 7.6°E
- Approximate paleocoordinates: 23.0°S 8.°E
- Region: Nordrhein-Westfalen, Rheinland-Pfalz
- Country: Germany
- Extent: Eifel, Rhenisch Schiefergebirge
- Ahbach Formation (Germany)

The Ahbach Formation is a geologic formation in Germany. It preserves fossils dated to the Middle Devonian Epoch.

== Fossil content ==
The formation has provided among others the following fossils:

- Alveolites intermixtus
- Aulopora serpens
- Favosites saginatus
- Heliolites porosus
- Pachytheca stellimicans
- Platyaxum (Platyaxum) escharoides
- Platyaxum (Egosiella) clathratum
- Pseudopalaeoporella lummatonensis
- Thamnophyllum caespitosum
- Thamnopora nicholsoni
- Thamnopora cf. dubia
- Cupressocrinites sp.
- Girvanella sp.
- Resteignella sp.
- Sphaerocodium sp.
- ?Couvinianella sp.
- Trilobita indet.

== See also ==
- List of fossiliferous stratigraphic units in Germany
