= Lercheck Limestone =

Geologic formation in Germany

- Stratigraphic range: Triassic
- Type: Formation

Lithology
- Primary: Limestone

Location
- Country: Germany

The Lercheck Limestone is a geologic formation in Germany. It preserves fossils dating back to the Triassic period.

== See also ==
- List of fossiliferous stratigraphic units in Germany
