= Molasse Group =

- Stratigraphic range: Neogene
- Type: Group

Location
- Country: Germany

The Molasse Group is a geologic group in Germany. It preserves fossils dating back to the Neogene period.

== See also ==
- List of fossiliferous stratigraphic units in Germany
