= Latdorf Formation =

Geologic formation in Germany

- Stratigraphic range: Paleogene
- Type: Formation

Location
- Country: Germany

The Latdorf Formation is a geologic formation in Germany. It preserves fossils dating back to the Paleogene period.

== See also ==
- List of fossiliferous stratigraphic units in Germany
