= Gogoliner Schichten Formation =

Geological formation in Germany

- Stratigraphic range: Triassic
- Type: Formation

Location
- Country: Germany

The Gogoliner Schichten Formation is a geologic formation in Germany. It preserves fossils dating back to the Triassic period.

== See also ==
- List of fossiliferous stratigraphic units in Germany
