= Schaumkalk Formation =

Geologic formation in Germany

- Stratigraphic range: Triassic
- Type: Formation

Location
- Country: Germany

The Schaumkalk Formation is a geologic formation in Germany. It preserves fossils dating back to the Triassic period.

== See also ==
- List of fossiliferous stratigraphic units in Germany
