= Friiesenrather Schichten Formation =

Geologic formation in Germany

- Stratigraphic range: Devonian
- Type: Formation

Location
- Country: Germany

The Friiesenrather Schichten Formation is a geologic formation in Germany.

== Geological Period ==
It preserves fossils dating back to the Devonian period.

== See also ==
- List of fossiliferous stratigraphic units in Germany
