= Saarbrücken Group =

- Stratigraphic range: Carboniferous
- Type: Group

Location
- Country: Germany

The Saarbrücken Group is a geologic group in Germany. It preserves fossils dating back to the Carboniferous period.

== See also ==
- List of fossiliferous stratigraphic units in Germany
