= Gehrener Formation =

Geologic formation in Germany

Gehrener Schichten
- Stratigraphic range: Gzhelian (Stephanian C); ~303–301 Ma
- Type: Formation
- Overlies: Ilmtal Granitoid

Lithology
- Primary: Shale

Location
- Coordinates: 50.7°N 10.9°E
- Approximate paleocoordinates: 3.2°N 19.3°E
- Region: Thuringia
- Country: Germany
- Extent: Thuringian Forest Basin

Type section
- Named for: Gehren
- Gehrener Formation (Germany)

The Gehrener Schichten (German for Gehren Formation) is a geologic formation in Germany. The fluvial to lacustrine shales preserve fossils dating back to the Late Carboniferous period (Stephanian C in European stratigraphy or Gzhelian in international stratigraphy).

== Fossil content ==
The following fossils were reported from the formation:

- Insects
  - Protelytroptera
    - Blattocoleidae
      - Blattocoleus tillyari
  - Blattodea
    - Mylacridae
      - Opsiomylacris (Opsiomylacris) densistriata

== See also ==
- List of fossiliferous stratigraphic units in Germany
