= Söhlde Formation =

Geologic formation in Germany

- Stratigraphic range: Cretaceous
- Type: Formation

Location
- Country: Germany

The Söhlde Formation is a geologic formation located in the federal states of Lower Saxony and Saxony-Anhalt in Germany. It preserves fossils from the Upper Cenomanian–lower Upper Turonian period.

== See also ==
- List of fossiliferous stratigraphic units in Germany
