= Brilon Shale =

Geologic formation in Germany

- Stratigraphic range: Devonian
- Type: Formation

Lithology
- Primary: Shale

Location
- Country: Germany

The Brilon Shale is a geologic formation in Germany. It preserves fossils dating back to the Devonian period.

== See also ==
- List of fossiliferous stratigraphic units in Germany
