= Ohlsbach Formation =

Geological formation that preserves fossils

- Stratigraphic range: Gzhelian; ~303–299 Ma
- Type: Formation

Lithology
- Primary: Coal

Location
- Coordinates: 48.5°N 8.2°E
- Approximate paleocoordinates: 0.9°N 18.4°E
- Region: Baden-Württemberg
- Country: Germany
- Extent: Baden-Baden Basin

Type section
- Named for: Hinterohlsbach
- Ohlsbach Formation (Germany)

The Ohlsbach Formation is a geologic formation in Germany. It preserves fossils dating back to the Gzhelian stage of the Late Carboniferous period.

== Fossil content ==
The following fossils have been reported from the formation:

- Insects
  - Blattodea
    - Archimylacridae
      - Sterzelia steinmanni

== See also ==
- List of fossiliferous stratigraphic units in Germany
