= Werkkalk Formation =

Geologic Formation

- Stratigraphic range: Jurassic Oxfordian (stage)
- Type: Formation

Lithology
- Primary: Lime mudstone or marl

Location
- Coordinates: 49.0° N, 11.3° E
- Approximate paleocoordinates: 40.2° N, 19.5° E
- Country: Bavaria, Germany

The Werkkalk Formation is a geologic formation in Germany. It preserves radiolarian fossils dating back to the Oxfordian Stage of the Late Jurassic Period. The fossils may be pyritised.

== See also ==
- List of fossiliferous stratigraphic units in Germany
