= Burgsandstein Formation =

Geologic formation in Germany

- Stratigraphic range: Triassic
- Type: Formation

Location
- Country: Germany

The Burgsandstein Formation is the Bavarian name for the Löwenstein Formation, a geologic formation in south Germany. It preserves fossils dating back to the Triassic period.

== See also ==
- Löwenstein Formation
- List of fossiliferous stratigraphic units in Germany
