= Selztal Group =

- Stratigraphic range: Paleogene
- Type: Group

Location
- Country: Germany

The Selztal Group is a geologic group in Germany. It preserves fossils dating back to the Paleogene period.

== See also ==
- List of fossiliferous stratigraphic units in Germany
