= Kohlschneider Formation =

Geologic formation in Germany

- Stratigraphic range: Carboniferous
- Type: Formation

Location
- Country: Germany

The Kohlschneider Formation is a geologic formation in Germany. It preserves fossils dating back to the Carboniferous period.

== See also ==
- List of fossiliferous stratigraphic units in Germany
