= Galgenberg Formation =

Fossiliferous geologic formation in Germany

- Stratigraphic range: Cambrian
- Type: Formation

Location
- Country: Germany

The Galgenberg Formation is a geologic formation in Germany. It preserves fossils dating back to the Cambrian period.

== See also ==
- List of fossiliferous stratigraphic units in Germany
