= Volpriehausen Formation =

Geological formation in the Netherlands and Germany

- Stratigraphic range: Permian
- Type: Formation

Location
- Country: Germany; Netherlands

The Volpriehausen Formation is a geologic formation in the Netherlands and Germany. It preserves fossils dating back to the Permian period.

== See also ==
- List of fossiliferous stratigraphic units in Germany
