= Glimmerton Formation =

Geologic formation in Germany

- Stratigraphic range: Neogene
- Type: Formation

Location
- Country: Germany

The Glimmerton Formation is a geologic formation in Germany. It preserves fossils dating back to the Neogene period.

== See also ==
- List of fossiliferous stratigraphic units in Germany
