= Falkenberg Group =

Geologic group in Germany

- Stratigraphic range: Cambrian
- Type: Group

Location
- Country: Germany

The Falkenberg Group is a geologic group in Germany. It preserves fossils dating back to the Cambrian period.

== See also ==
- List of fossiliferous stratigraphic units in Germany
