= Wellheim Formation =

Geologic formation in Bavaria, Germany

- Stratigraphic range: upper Cenomanian to lower Turonian 98–91 Ma
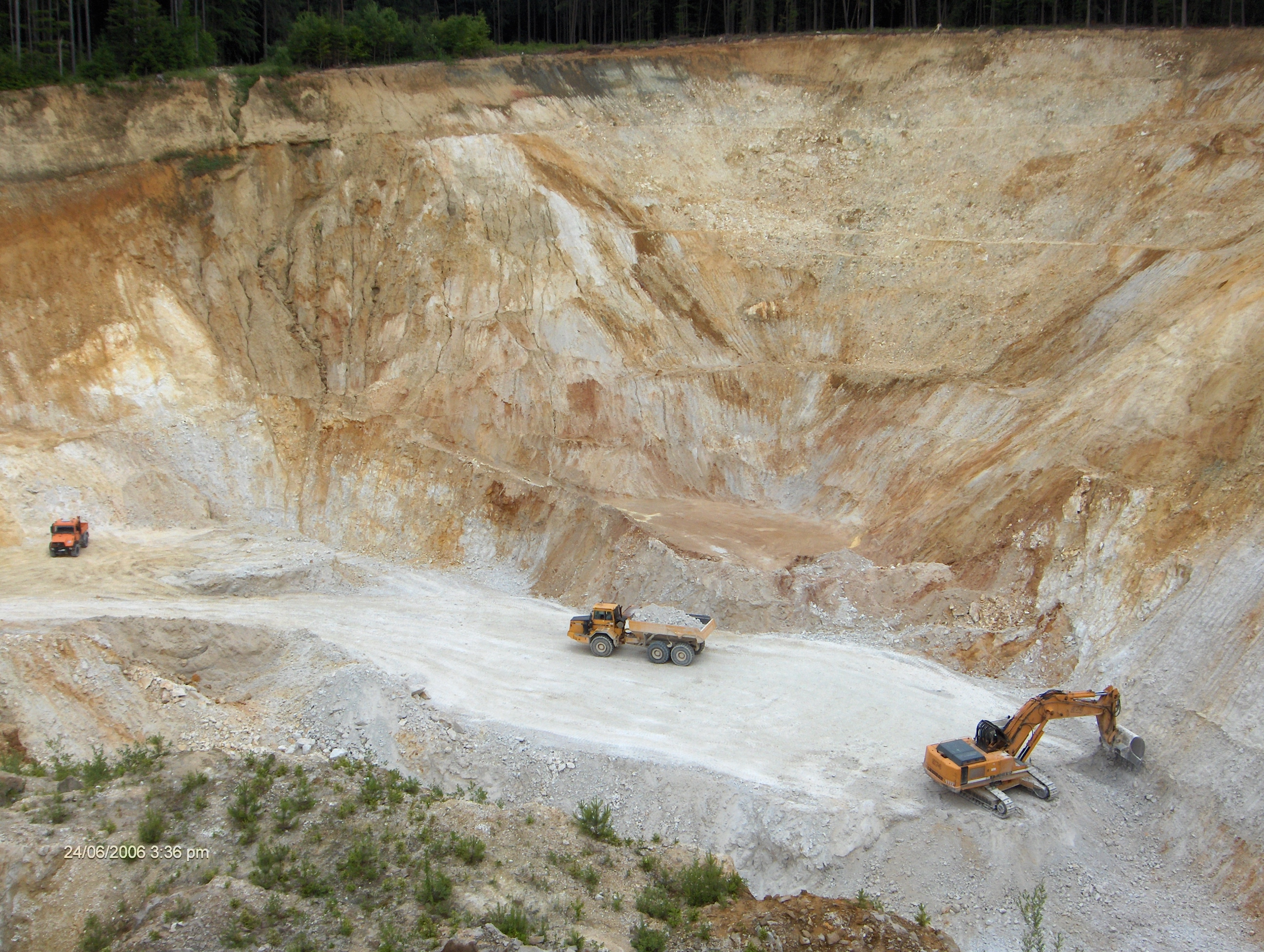
- Siliceous earth quarrying of the Wellheim Formation near Neuburg
- Type: Geological formation
- Unit of: Danubian Cretaceous Group
- Sub-units: basal marine sandstone, Neuburg Kieselerde Member, Homsand facies
- Underlies: Upper Freshwater Molasse Formation or Pleistocene loams
- Overlies: Schutzfels Formation or Upper Jurassic limestone
- Area: southern Franconian Jura, Upper Bavaria
- Thickness: up to 130 metres (430 ft)

Lithology
- Primary: spiculitic silt, fine and medium sands, fine-grained silica (Kieselerde)
- Other: silicified conglomerate

Location
- Country: Germany
- Extent: 200 km^{2} (77 sq mi)

Type section
- Named for: Wellheim
- Named by: B. Niebuhr, T. Pürner, and M. Wilmsen
- Location: open pit mines near Wellheim, Germany
- Year defined: 2009
- Country: Germany

The Wellheim Formation is a geological formation in southern Germany deposited during the Cenomanian to earliest Turonian stages of the Upper Cretaceous.

The Formation is subdivided into three member units: unnamed basal marine sandstone, the Neuburg Kieselerde Member, and an upper silicified conglomerate (Homsand facies).
Geographically, this formation is located in the central southernmost part of the Franconian Jura, on the left bank of the Danube, roughly between the towns of Wellheim and Neuburg in Bavaria.
The formation is commercially quarried for siliceous earth, which has a variety of applications.

== Stratigraphy ==
The formation infills karstic voids found in Upper Jurassic limestones. Its upper contact is with either Miocene Upper Freshwater Molasse clays and marls or Pleistocene glacial deposits while the lower contact is with the Jurassic limestones, or the Lower Cretaceous Schutzfels Formation, a terrestrial unit which also infills the karstic terrain.

== Depositional Environment ==
The Wellheim Formation was formed in a quiet water environment by deposition of pelagic sediments into a number of submerged karsts in the ocean floor over several million years. Wilmsen et al (2010) identified the primary sediment composition as sandy and spiculitic sediments, with notably little terrigenous input. It consists of marine sediments classified as opoka. Opoka refers to Upper Cretaceous sponge spicule-rich, siliceous, marine limestones found in Poland and western Ukraine.

Lüttig (2007) called the scientific view of the formation of the Neuburg Kieselerde Member "contested" (Note: German: "nicht unumstritten", referring to the dissenting view of the sole exploiting company) however that position has not been supported by subsequent authors.

== Fossils ==
The Wellheim Formation is fossiliferous with the Neuburg Kieselerde Member having one of the most diverse invertebrate assemblages in the Danubian Cretaceous Group. Schneider et al. (2013) mapped fossil yielding localities associated with this member in a rough triangle between Wellheim, Rennertshofen and Neuburg.

== Age and correlation ==
It was deposited between about 93 to 98 million years ago during the Cenomanian, the lowest stage of the Upper Cretaceous.
The index fossil associated with these sediments is Inoceramus crippsi, a wing-shaped (pteriomorph) salt-water bivalve.

== Commercial exploitation ==
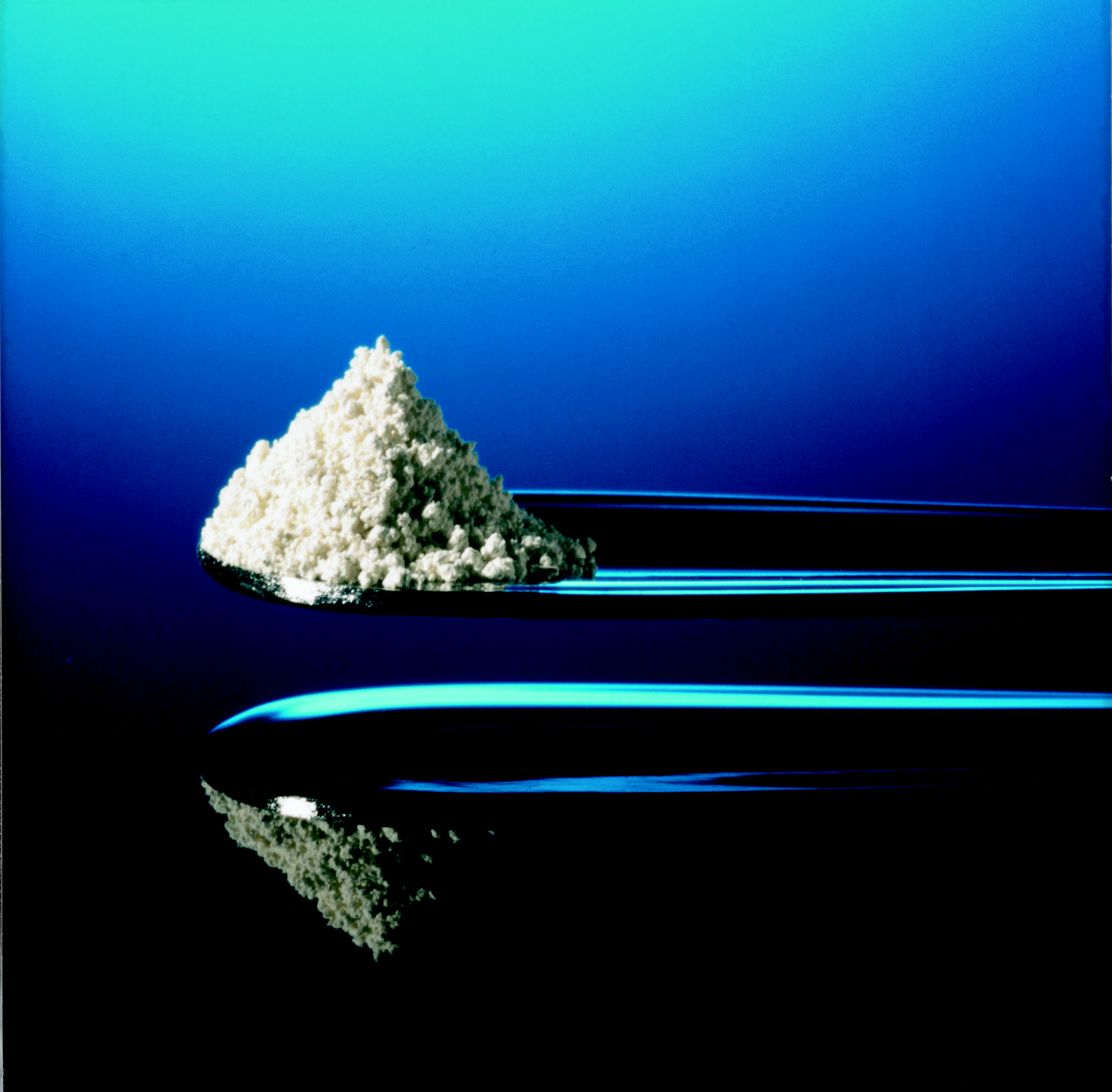
siliceous earth sample on a spoon

Mining of Neuburg Kieselerde Member sediments takes place at an industrial scale around Neuburg an der Donau. The products are marketed under the umbrella term siliceous earth (German: Kieselerde). The sediment is used as a filler material, an abrasive and polishing medium, a paint and varnish additive and as a nutritional supplement.

It is generally composed of silicic acid (80 percent by weight or less) and kaolinite.

In 2015, 55,000 tons of the purified material were produced. This required the open-pit mining of 120,000 tons of raw siliceous earth.

The producer has claimed a non-biogenic, mineral origin for their product, while most other sources assert a biogenic origin for the material. (Note: For example, Schneider et al., 2013 have this statement as the first sentence of their article's abstract: "With approximately 100 species, the invertebrate macrofauna of the Neuburg Kieselerde Member of the Wellheim Formation (Bavaria, southern Germany) is probably the most diverse fossil assemblage of the Danubian Cretaceous Group.") Substances called siliceous earths are usually defined as having a biogenic origin, with material of a similar composition usually being termed diatomaceous earth.

The producer also has repeatedly claimed a unique "one-of-a-kind worldwide" status of their product, but Lüttig refuted this in 2007 for the material that is produced, saying that several similar material deposits are known, naming Heiligenhafener Gestein as an example. On the other hand he agreed that the very special formation circumstances could indeed be called unique.

It has historically been used for the production of glass, ceramics and color pigments like ultramarine.

== Sources ==
- Elsner, Harald (28 January 2016). Quarzrohstoffe in Deutschland [Silica resources in Germany] (PDF) (in German). Bundesanstalt für Geowissenschaften und Rohstoffe. ISBN 9783943566314.
- Groteklaes, Michael (ed.). "Kieselerde, RD-11-01037". RömppOnline.
- Göske, Jürgen; Kachler, Werner (September 2008). "Morphology, Physiochemistry and Phase Analysis of Neuburg Siliceous Earth" (PDF). Microscopy and Analysis. September 2008. Weinheim: Wiley-VCH GmbH: 23–24.
- Heckl, Siegfried; Knör, Nicole (2011). "Better filling of polyamides" (PDF). Kunststoffe International. 2/2011. Munich: Carl Hanser Verlag: 70–73. ISSN 1862-4243.
- Hoffmann Mineral GmbH (30 April 2010), "Aktisil", DPMAregister (trademark register entry), no. 1056011, German Patent and Trade Mark Office
- "Kieselsäuresalze - Kieselschiefer". Meyers Konversationslexikon (4th ed.). Leipzig; Wien: Verlag des Bibliographischen Instituts. 1885–1892.
- Lüttig, Gerd (2007). "Kieselerde ist nicht gleich Kieselgur - Naturwissenschaftliche Anmerkungen zu Heilerde-Präparaten" [Siliceous earth is not the same as kieselgur - Scientific remarks on "Healing earth" preparations] (PDF). Erfahrungsheilkunde (in German). 56 (3): 154–161. doi:10.1055/s-2007-968058. ISSN 1439-4294. Archived from the original (PDF) on 16 August 2021.
- Machalski, M.; Malchyk, O. (2019). "Relative bathymetric position of opoka and chalk in the Late Cretaceous European Basin". Cretaceous Research. 102: 30–36. doi:10.1016/j.cretres.2019.05.007. S2CID 181970561.
- Mushack, R.; Bachmann, W. (1996). "Neuburger Kieselerde: natürliche, funktionelle Füllstoffe" [Neuburg siliceous earth: natural, functional filler substances]. GAK: Gummi, Fasern, Kunststoffe; Fachmagazin für die Polymerindustrie (in German). 49 (8). Ratingen: Gupta: 620–629. ISSN 0176-1625.
- Niebuhr, B.; Pürner, T.; Wilmsen, M. (2009). "Lithostratigraphie der außeralpinen Kreide Bayerns" [Litho-stratigraphy of the ex-alpine Cretaceous of Bavaria]. Schriftenreihe der Deutschen Gesellschaft für Geowissenschaften (in German). 65. Stuttgart, Germany: Schweizerbart Science Publishers: 7–58.
- Roth, Meinhart; Reiter, Susanne; Oggermüller, Hubert (October 2020). "Neuburg Siliceous Earth as a functional extender for high performance road marking paints" (PDF). Asia Pacific Coatings Journal. October 2020. Dubai: dmg events: 45–47. ISSN 1468-1412.
- Salvador, R. B.; Prieto, J.; Mayr, C.; Rasser, M. W. (2016). "New gastropod assemblages from the Early/Middle Miocene of Riedensheim and Adelschlag-Fasanerie, southern Germany". Neues Jahrbuch für Geologie und Paläontologie, Abhandlungen. 279 (2): 127–154. doi:10.1127/njgpa/2016/0546.
- Schanz, Sebastian (1 July 2016). "Neuburg: Eine weltweit einzigartige Ressource" [Neuburg: A globally unique resource] (in German). Ingolstadt: Donaukurier. Archived from the original on 9 June 2021.
- Schneider, S.; Jaeger, M.; Kroh, A.; Mitterer, A.; Niebuhr, B.; Vodrážka, R.; Wilmsen, M; Wood, C.; Zágoršek, K. (2013). "Silicified sea life–Macrofauna and palaeoecology of the Neuburg Kieselerde Member (Cenomanian to Lower Turonian Wellheim Formation, Bavaria, southern Germany)". Acta Geologica Polonica. 63 (4): 555–610. doi:10.2478/agp-2013-0025. hdl:11104/0232166. S2CID 54968776.
- Schönrock, Dirk (2008). Neuburger Kieselerde: Gewinnung, Veredelung, Anwendungen als funktioneller Füllstoff [Hoffmann Mineral] [Neuburg siliceous earth: Excavation, refinement, uses as a functional filler substance [Hoffmann Mineral]]. Die Bibliothek der Technik (in German). Vol. 308. Landsberg: Verlag Moderne Industrie. ISBN 9783937889771.
- Stork, Stefanie (25 August 2009). "Von der Kieselerde zum Poliermittel" [From siliceous earth to polishing agent] (in German). Augsburger Allgemeine. Archived from the original on 26 March 2018.
- Wilmsen, Markus; Niebuhr, Birgit (2010). "On the age of the Upper Cretaceous transgression between Regensburg and Neuburg an der Donau". Neues Jahrbuch für Geologie und Paläontologie - Abhandlungen. 256 (3): 267–278. doi:10.1127/0077-7749/2010/0051.
- "Hoffmann Mineral baut Kieselerde ab – ein weltweit einzigartiges Vorkommen" [Hoffmann Mineral is mining siliceous earth – A globally unique deposit]. baublatt.de (in German). Zeppelin Baumaschinen GmbH. 27 August 2019. Archived from the original on 9 June 2021.
