= Braunjura Group =

Geologic group in France

- Stratigraphic range: Jurassic
- Type: Group

Location
- Country: France

The Braunjura Group is a geologic group in France. It preserves fossils dating back to the Jurassic period.

== See also ==
- List of fossiliferous stratigraphic units in France
