= Usseltal Formation =

- Stratigraphic range: Jurassic
- Type: Formation

Location
- Country: Germany

The Usseltal Formation is a geologic formation in Germany. It preserves fossils dating back to the Jurassic period.

== See also ==
- List of fossiliferous stratigraphic units in Germany
