= Rögling Formation =

- Stratigraphic range: Kimmeridgian
- Type: Formation
- Underlies: Solnhofen Limestone
- Overlies: Torleite Formation
- Thickness: Up to 40 metres

Lithology
- Primary: Limestone

Location
- Country: Germany

The Rögling Formation is a geologic formation in Germany. It preserves fossils dating back to the Jurassic period.

== See also ==
- List of fossiliferous stratigraphic units in Germany
