= List of fossiliferous stratigraphic units in Montenegro =

Fossiliferous stratigraphic units in Montenegro
Budoš Limestone
Wengener Schichten Formation
Porphyrit-Hornstein Formation

This is a list of fossiliferous stratigraphic units in Montenegro.

== List of fossiliferous stratigraphic units ==
| Formation | Period | Notes |
|---|---|---|
| Seoca Lithiotis Limestone | Pliensbachian-Toarcian | |
| Wengener Schichten Formation | Ladinian | |
| Porphyrit-Hornstein Formation | Ladinian | |

== See also ==
- Lists of fossiliferous stratigraphic units in Europe
  - List of fossiliferous stratigraphic units in Albania
  - List of fossiliferous stratigraphic units in Bosnia and Herzegovina
  - List of fossiliferous stratigraphic units in Croatia
  - List of fossiliferous stratigraphic units in Italy
  - List of fossiliferous stratigraphic units in Serbia
