= Lists of fossiliferous stratigraphic units =

This is a lists of fossiliferous stratigraphic units.

== Africa ==
- List of fossiliferous stratigraphic units in Angola
- List of fossiliferous stratigraphic units in Botswana
- List of fossiliferous stratigraphic units in Cameroon
- List of fossiliferous stratigraphic units in Cape Verde
- List of fossiliferous stratigraphic units in the Democratic Republic of the Congo
- List of fossiliferous stratigraphic units in Djibouti
- List of fossiliferous stratigraphic units in Eritrea
- List of fossiliferous stratigraphic units in Ethiopia
- List of fossiliferous stratigraphic units in Gabon
- List of fossiliferous stratigraphic units in Ghana
- List of fossiliferous stratigraphic units in Guinea
- List of fossiliferous stratigraphic units in Ivory Coast
- List of fossiliferous stratigraphic units in Kenya
- List of fossiliferous stratigraphic units in Lesotho
- List of fossiliferous stratigraphic units in Madagascar
- List of fossiliferous stratigraphic units in Malawi
- List of fossiliferous stratigraphic units in Mali
- List of fossiliferous stratigraphic units in Mauritania
- List of fossiliferous stratigraphic units in Mozambique
- List of fossiliferous stratigraphic units in Namibia
- List of fossiliferous stratigraphic units in Niger
- List of fossiliferous stratigraphic units in Senegal
- List of fossiliferous stratigraphic units in Seychelles
- List of fossiliferous stratigraphic units in Somalia
- List of fossiliferous stratigraphic units in South Africa
- List of fossiliferous stratigraphic units in Sudan
- List of fossiliferous stratigraphic units in Tanzania
- List of fossiliferous stratigraphic units in Togo
- List of fossiliferous stratigraphic units in Western Sahara
- List of fossiliferous stratigraphic units in Zambia
- List of fossiliferous stratigraphic units in Zimbabwe

== Europe ==
- List of fossiliferous stratigraphic units in Albania
- List of fossiliferous stratigraphic units in Armenia
- List of fossiliferous stratigraphic units in Austria
- List of fossiliferous stratigraphic units in Azerbaijan
- List of fossiliferous stratigraphic units in Belarus
- List of fossiliferous stratigraphic units in Belgium
- List of fossiliferous stratigraphic units in Bosnia and Herzegovina
- List of fossiliferous stratigraphic units in Bulgaria
- List of fossiliferous stratigraphic units in Croatia
- List of fossiliferous stratigraphic units in Cyprus
- List of fossiliferous stratigraphic units in Czech Republic
- List of fossiliferous stratigraphic units in Denmark
- List of fossiliferous stratigraphic units in Estonia
- List of fossiliferous stratigraphic units in France
- List of fossiliferous stratigraphic units in Georgia (country)
- List of fossiliferous stratigraphic units in Germany
- List of fossiliferous stratigraphic units in Gibraltar
- List of fossiliferous stratigraphic units in Greece
- List of fossiliferous stratigraphic units in Hungary
- List of fossiliferous stratigraphic units in Iceland
- List of fossiliferous stratigraphic units in the Republic of Ireland
- List of fossiliferous stratigraphic units in the Isle of Man
- List of fossiliferous stratigraphic units in Italy
- List of fossiliferous stratigraphic units in Kazakhstan
- List of fossiliferous stratigraphic units in Republic of Kosovo
- List of fossiliferous stratigraphic units in Latvia
- List of fossiliferous stratigraphic units in Liechtenstein
- List of fossiliferous stratigraphic units in Lithuania
- List of fossiliferous stratigraphic units in Luxembourg
- List of fossiliferous stratigraphic units in Montenegro
- List of fossiliferous stratigraphic units in the Netherlands
- List of fossiliferous stratigraphic units in Northern Cyprus
- List of fossiliferous stratigraphic units in Norway
- List of fossiliferous stratigraphic units in Poland
- List of fossiliferous stratigraphic units in Portugal
- List of fossiliferous stratigraphic units in Romania
- List of fossiliferous stratigraphic units in Russia
- List of fossiliferous stratigraphic units in Serbia
- List of fossiliferous stratigraphic units in Slovakia
- List of fossiliferous stratigraphic units in Slovenia
- List of fossiliferous stratigraphic units in Spain
- List of fossiliferous stratigraphic units in Svalbard
- List of fossiliferous stratigraphic units in Sweden
- List of fossiliferous stratigraphic units in Switzerland
- List of fossiliferous stratigraphic units in Turkey
- List of fossiliferous stratigraphic units in Ukraine
- List of fossiliferous stratigraphic units in the United Kingdom
  - List of fossiliferous stratigraphic units in England
  - List of fossiliferous stratigraphic units in Northern Ireland
  - List of fossiliferous stratigraphic units in Scotland
  - List of fossiliferous stratigraphic units in Wales

== North America ==
=== Canada ===
- List of fossiliferous stratigraphic units in Alberta
- List of fossiliferous stratigraphic units in British Columbia
- List of fossiliferous stratigraphic units in Manitoba
- List of fossiliferous stratigraphic units in New Brunswick
- List of fossiliferous stratigraphic units in Newfoundland and Labrador
- List of fossiliferous stratigraphic units in the Northwest Territories
- List of fossiliferous stratigraphic units in Nova Scotia
- List of fossiliferous stratigraphic units in Nunavut
- List of fossiliferous stratigraphic units in Ontario
- List of fossiliferous stratigraphic units in Prince Edward Island
- List of fossiliferous stratigraphic units in Quebec
- List of fossiliferous stratigraphic units in Saskatchewan
- List of fossiliferous stratigraphic units in Yukon

=== United States ===
- List of fossiliferous stratigraphic units in Alabama
- List of fossiliferous stratigraphic units in Alaska
- List of fossiliferous stratigraphic units in Arizona
- List of fossiliferous stratigraphic units in Arkansas
- List of fossiliferous stratigraphic units in California
- List of fossiliferous stratigraphic units in Colorado
- List of fossiliferous stratigraphic units in Connecticut
- List of fossiliferous stratigraphic units in Delaware
- List of fossiliferous stratigraphic units in Florida
- List of fossiliferous stratigraphic units in Georgia (U.S. state)
- List of fossiliferous stratigraphic units in Hawaii
- List of fossiliferous stratigraphic units in Idaho
- List of fossiliferous stratigraphic units in Illinois
- List of fossiliferous stratigraphic units in Indiana
- List of fossiliferous stratigraphic units in Iowa
- List of fossiliferous stratigraphic units in Kansas
- List of fossiliferous stratigraphic units in Kentucky
- List of fossiliferous stratigraphic units in Louisiana
- List of fossiliferous stratigraphic units in Maine
- List of fossiliferous stratigraphic units in Maryland
- List of fossiliferous stratigraphic units in Massachusetts
- List of fossiliferous stratigraphic units in Michigan
- List of fossiliferous stratigraphic units in Minnesota
- List of fossiliferous stratigraphic units in Mississippi
- List of fossiliferous stratigraphic units in Missouri
- List of fossiliferous stratigraphic units in Montana
- List of fossiliferous stratigraphic units in Nebraska
- List of fossiliferous stratigraphic units in Nevada
- List of fossiliferous stratigraphic units in New Hampshire
- List of fossiliferous stratigraphic units in New Jersey
- List of fossiliferous stratigraphic units in New Mexico
- List of fossiliferous stratigraphic units in New York
- List of fossiliferous stratigraphic units in North Carolina
- List of fossiliferous stratigraphic units in North Dakota
- List of fossiliferous stratigraphic units in Ohio
- List of fossiliferous stratigraphic units in Oklahoma
- List of fossiliferous stratigraphic units in Oregon
- List of fossiliferous stratigraphic units in Pennsylvania
- List of fossiliferous stratigraphic units in Rhode Island
- List of fossiliferous stratigraphic units in South Carolina
- List of fossiliferous stratigraphic units in South Dakota
- List of fossiliferous stratigraphic units in Tennessee
- List of fossiliferous stratigraphic units in Texas
- List of fossiliferous stratigraphic units in Utah
- List of fossiliferous stratigraphic units in Vermont
- List of fossiliferous stratigraphic units in Virginia
- List of fossiliferous stratigraphic units in Washington (state)
- List of fossiliferous stratigraphic units in Washington, D.C.
- List of fossiliferous stratigraphic units in West Virginia
- List of fossiliferous stratigraphic units in Wisconsin
- List of fossiliferous stratigraphic units in Wyoming

=== Other ===
- List of fossiliferous stratigraphic units in the Caribbean
- List of fossiliferous stratigraphic units in Central America
- List of fossiliferous stratigraphic units in Greenland
- List of fossiliferous stratigraphic units in Mexico

== South America ==
- List of fossiliferous stratigraphic units in Bolivia
- List of fossiliferous stratigraphic units in Colombia
- List of fossiliferous stratigraphic units in Ecuador
- List of fossiliferous stratigraphic units in the Falkland Islands
- List of fossiliferous stratigraphic units in Guyana
- List of fossiliferous stratigraphic units in Paraguay
- List of fossiliferous stratigraphic units in Peru
- List of fossiliferous stratigraphic units in Uruguay
- List of fossiliferous stratigraphic units in Venezuela

== By other location ==
- List of fossiliferous stratigraphic units in Antarctica
- List of fossiliferous stratigraphic units in Australia
- List of fossiliferous stratigraphic units in Fiji
- List of fossiliferous stratigraphic units in Palau

== By preserved taxon ==
- List of dinosaur-bearing stratigraphic units
- List of phytosaur-bearing stratigraphic units
- List of plesiosaur-bearing stratigraphic units
- List of pterosaur-bearing stratigraphic units
- List of thalattosuchian-bearing stratigraphic units

== See also ==
- List of fossil sites
- Paleontology lists
- Paleontological sites
- Stratigraphy
