= List of fossiliferous stratigraphic units in Belarus =

Fossiliferous stratigraphic units in Belarus
Coal Measures Formation
Silurian
Ordovician

This is a list of fossiliferous stratigraphic units in Belarus.

== List of fossiliferous stratigraphic units ==
Formation	Period	Notes
Coal Measures Formation	Bajocian	
Kantinovo Formation	Pridoli	
Kustin Formation	Pridoli	
Tomashov Formation	Pridoli	
Franopol' Formation	Gorstian	
Zel'van Formation	Telychian	
Rusilov Formation	Ludlow	
Kaimynai Formation	Katian (Nabala)	
Paekna Formation	Katian (Nabala)	
Alvitas Formation	Sandbian-Katian (Oandu)	
Duksta Formation	Sandbian-Katian (Oandu)	
Dysna Formation	Sandbian-Katian (Oandu)	
Jakšiai Formation	Sandbian-Katian (Rakvere)	
Jobupeskaja Formation	Dapingian-Darriwilian (Kunda)	
Pivorjaiskaja Formation	Dapingian-Darriwilian (Kunda)	
Gaide Formation	Dapingian (Volkhov)	

== See also ==
- Lists of fossiliferous stratigraphic units in Europe
  - List of fossiliferous stratigraphic units in Latvia
  - List of fossiliferous stratigraphic units in Lithuania
  - List of fossiliferous stratigraphic units in Poland
  - List of fossiliferous stratigraphic units in Russia
  - List of fossiliferous stratigraphic units in Ukraine
