= List of fossiliferous stratigraphic units in Hungary =

This is a list of fossiliferous stratigraphic units in Hungary.

== List of fossiliferous stratigraphic units in Hungary ==
Group	Formation	Period	Notes
	Edelény Formation	Tortonian (MN 9)	
	Kozard Formation	Serravallian	
	Leitha Limestone	Badenian	
	Rákos Limestone	Badenian	
	Sajovolgyi Formation	Badenian	
	Sámsonháza Formation	Badenian	
	Pétervására Formation	Burdigalian	
	Eger Formation	Chattian	
	Mány Formation	Chattian	
	Upper Cyrena Formation	Chattian	
	Tard Clay Formation	Rupelian	
	Kiscell Formation	Oligocene	
	Törökbálint Formation	Oligocene	
	Buda Marl	Priabonian	
	Padrag Marl	Bartonian-Priabonian	
	Dorog Coal Formation	Lutetian-Bartonian	
	Kincses Formation	Lutetian-Bartonian	
	Csolnok Marl	Lutetian	
	Polány Marl	Campanian	
	Ugod Formation	Campanian	
	Ajka Coal Formation	Santonian	
	Csehbánya Formation	Santonian	
	Alsópere Bauxite Formation	Albian	
	Zirc Limestone	Albian	
	Labatlan Sandstone	Barremian	
	Bersek Marl	Valanginian-Barremian	
	Borzavar Limestone	Hauterivian	
	Grès rouges Formation	Hauterivian	
	Hidasivölgy Marl	Valanginian	
	Magyaregregy Conglomerate	Valanginian	
	Marne Gris-Lilas	Valanginian	
	Mogyorósdomb Limestone	Valanginian	
	Szentivánhegy Limestone	Tithonian-Berriasian	
	Pálihálás Limestone	Oxfordian-Tithonian	
	Szarsomlyo Limestone	Oxfordian	
	Villány Formation	Bathonian-Callovian	
	South Bükk Shales Formation	Bajocian	
	Tölgyhát Formation	Toarcian-Aalenian	
	Hierlatz Formation	Sinemurian-Aalenian	
	Kisgerecse Marl	Toarcian	
	Somssichhegy Formation	Toarcian	
	Tűzkövesárok Limestone	Toarcian	
	Úrkút Manganese Ore Formation	Toarcian	
	Kcskehát Limestone	Pliensbachian	
	Isztimér Formation	Sinemurian-Pliensbachian	
	Mecsek Coal Formation	Hettangian-Pliensbachian	
	Kardosréti Mészko Formation	Hettangian-Sinemurian	
	Pisznice Limestone	Hettangian-Sinemurian	
	Ablakoskövölgy Limestone	Triassic	
Alsó Keuper Group	Physiocardia Formation	Triassic	
	Aszofö Formation	Triassic	
	Buchenstein Formation	Triassic	
	Cassian Formation	Triassic	
	Cordevol Formation	Triassic	
	Csopak Formation	Triassic	
	Csövar Formation	Triassic	
	Dachstein Limestone	Triassic	
	Dorgicse Formation	Triassic	
	Dunnatető Limestone	Triassic	
	Fődolomit	Carnian-Norian	
	Fassan Formation	Triassic	
	Fekete Formation	Triassic	
	Felsõörs Formation	Triassic	
	Hidegkut Formation	Triassic	
	Jakabhegy Formation	Triassic	
	Köveskal Dolomite Formation	Triassic	
	Langobard Formation	Triassic	
	Mészhegy Sandstone	Carnian	
	Pelsonian Formation	Triassic	
	Recoaro Formation	Triassic	
	Reiflingerkalk Formation	Triassic	
	Rezi Dolomite	Triassic	
	Sandorhegy Limestone	Triassic	
	Sándorhegy Formation	Triassic	
	Wetterstein Formation	Ladinian-Carnian	
	Steinalm Formation	Anisian-Ladinian	
	Templomhegy Dolomite	Ladinian	
	Vaszoly Formation	Triassic	
	Veszprém Marl	Triassic	
	Zuhánya Limestone	Triassic	
	Alcsutdoboz Limestone	Triassic, Permian	
	Gerennavar Formation	Triassic, Permian	
	Boda Formation	Permian	
	Dinnyes Dolomite	Permian	
	Korpad Formation	Permian	
	Kovagoszolos Formation	Permian	
	Nagyvisnyo Formation	Permian	
	Szentlélek Formation	Permian	

== See also ==
- Lists of fossiliferous stratigraphic units in Europe
  - List of fossiliferous stratigraphic units in Slovakia
  - List of fossiliferous stratigraphic units in Ukraine
  - List of fossiliferous stratigraphic units in Romania
  - List of fossiliferous stratigraphic units in Serbia
  - List of fossiliferous stratigraphic units in Croatia
  - List of fossiliferous stratigraphic units in Slovenia
  - List of fossiliferous stratigraphic units in Austria
