= List of fossiliferous stratigraphic units in Somalia =

Major fossiliferous stratigraphic units in Somalia
Guban Group
Hafún Group
Carcar Group
Auradu Formation
Tisje Formation
Gawan Limestone
Earlier Jurassic formations

This is a list of fossiliferous stratigraphic units in Somalia.

== List of fossiliferous stratigraphic units ==
Group	Formation	Period	Notes
Guban Group	Dubar Formation	Middle Miocene	
Guban Group	Dubar Formation	Early Miocene	
Hafún Group	Gargorre Formation	Middle Miocene	
Hafún Group	Ghibirti Formation	Early Miocene	
Hafún Group	Tavo Formation	Late Oligocene	
Hafún Group	Gheldeis Formation	Early Oligocene	
Hafún Group	Gianti Formation	Early Oligocene	
Buran Group		Late Eocene	
Carcar Group	Karkar Formation	Late Eocene	
Carcar Group	Karkar Formation	Lutetian	
Daban Group	Daban Formation	Lutetian	
	Auradu Formation	Ypresian	
	Auradu Formation	Paleocene	
	Auradu Formation	Maastrichtian	
	Tisje Formation	late Campanian	
	Gawan Limestone	Tithonian	
	Meragalleh Limestone	Kimmeridgian	
	Daghani Shale	Kimmeridgian	
	Wanderer Limestone	early Kimmeridgian	
	Daua Limestone	late Oxfordian	
	Gahodleh Shale	Oxfordian	
	Juba Limestone	Oxfordian	
	Sa Wer Formation	Oxfordian	
	Sa Wer Formation	Callovian	
	Bihen or Bihin Limestone	Oxfordian	
	Bihen or Bihin Limestone	Callovian	
	Bihen or Bihin Limestone	Bajocian	
	Bihen or Bihin Limestone	Bathonian	
	Uanei Formation	early Toarcian	

== See also ==
- Lists of fossiliferous stratigraphic units in Africa
  - List of fossiliferous stratigraphic units in Djibouti
  - List of fossiliferous stratigraphic units in Ethiopia
  - List of fossiliferous stratigraphic units in Kenya
- Geology of Somalia
