= List of fossiliferous stratigraphic units in Senegal =

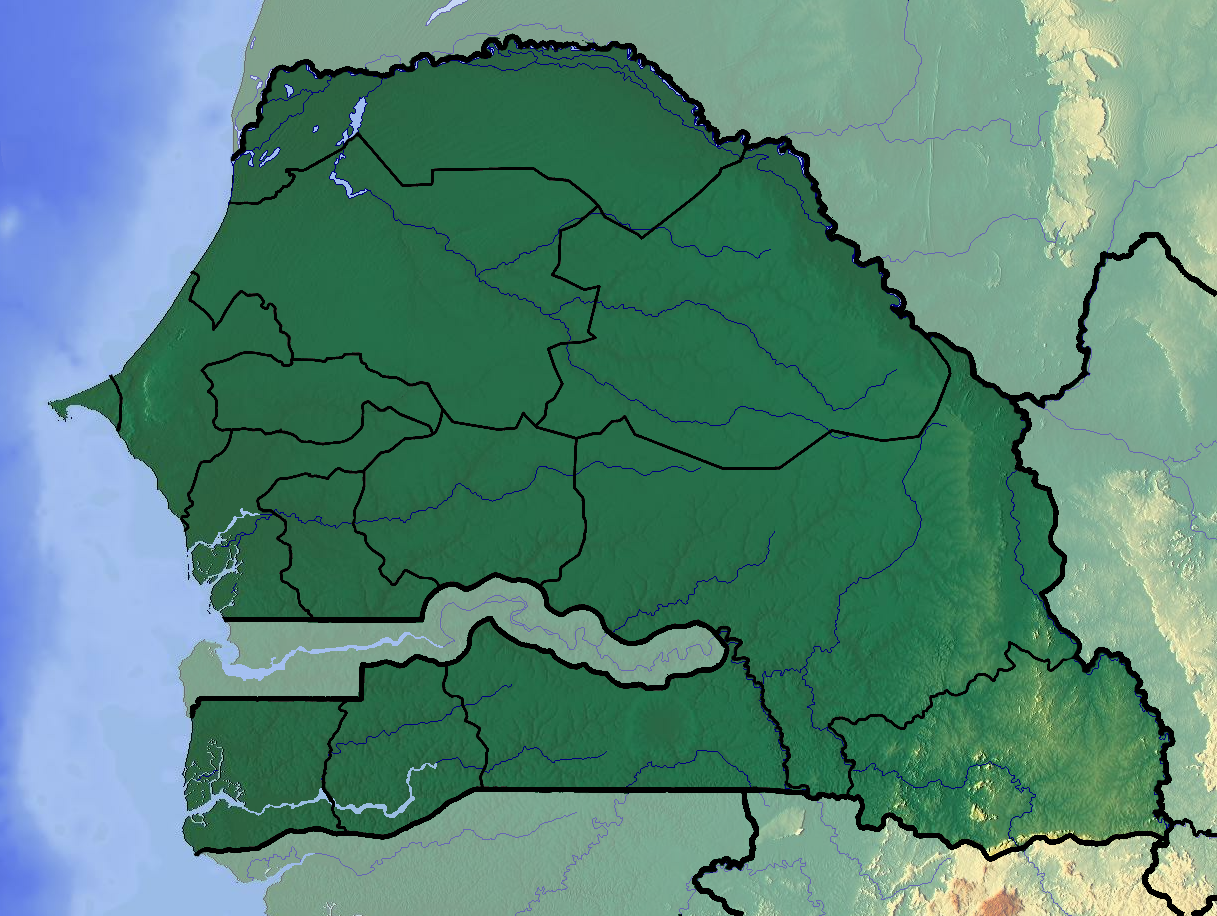
Fossiliferous stratigraphic units in Senegal
Lumachelle Formation
Taiba Formation
Nandoumari Formation

This is a list of fossiliferous stratigraphic units in Senegal.

== List of fossiliferous stratigraphic units ==
Formation	Period	Fossils	Notes
Lumachelle Formation	Lutetian	Ostrea cf. maradensis, Ostrea reili, ?Moeritherium sp., Condylarthra indet.	
Taiba Formation	Early Lutetian	Carcharias koerti, Galeocerdo latidens, Lamna obliqua, Macrorhizodus praecursor, Chiloscyllium aff. meraense, Abdounia sp., Burnhamia sp., Coupatezia sp., Cylindracanthus sp., Dasyatis sp., Rhinobatos sp., ?Brachycarcharias sp., Prorastomidae indet., Protocetidae indet.	
Nandoumari Formation	Cambrian Stage 2	Aldanella attleborensis, Chancelloria sp., Eiffelia sp., Glomospira sp., Hemisphaerammina sp., Tolypammina sp., Turritellella sp., ?Sorosphaera sp., Echinodermata indet.	

== See also ==
- Lists of fossiliferous stratigraphic units in Africa
  - List of fossiliferous stratigraphic units in Cape Verde
  - List of fossiliferous stratigraphic units in Guinea
  - List of fossiliferous stratigraphic units in Mali
  - List of fossiliferous stratigraphic units in Mauritania
- Geology of Senegal
