= List of fossiliferous stratigraphic units in Cyprus =

Fossiliferous stratigraphic units in Cyprus
Nicosia Formation
Koronia Formation
Pakhna Formation
Lefkara Formation
Perapedhi Formation
Vlambouros Formation
Phasoula Formation
Petra-tou-Roumiou Formation

The following fossiliferous stratigraphic units are found in Cyprus.

Group	Formation	Period	Notes
	Nicosia Formation	Pliocene	
	Koronia Formation	Tortonian	
	Pakhna Formation	Aquitanian-Serravallian	
	Lefkara Formation	Thanetian-Lutetian	
	Perapedhi Formation	Turonian-Santonian	
Ayios Photios Group	Vlambouros Formation	Norian	
Dhiarizos Group	Phasoula Formation	Early Norian	
	Petra-tou-Roumiou Formation	Carnian	

== See also ==
- Lists of fossiliferous stratigraphic units in Europe
  - List of fossiliferous stratigraphic units in Greece
  - List of fossiliferous stratigraphic units in Northern Cyprus
  - List of fossiliferous stratigraphic units in Turkey
- Geology of Cyprus
- Petra tou Romiou
- Cyprus dwarf hippopotamus
- Cyprus dwarf elephant
- Argonauta absyrtus
