= List of fossiliferous stratigraphic units in Hawaii =

This article contains a list of fossil-bearing stratigraphic units in the state of Hawaii, U.S.

== Sites ==
Group or Formation	Period	Notes
Pahala Formation	Neogene	
Waimanalo Formation	Neogene	

== See also ==
- Paleontology in Hawaii
- Lists of fossiliferous stratigraphic units in the United States
