= List of fossiliferous stratigraphic units in Togo =

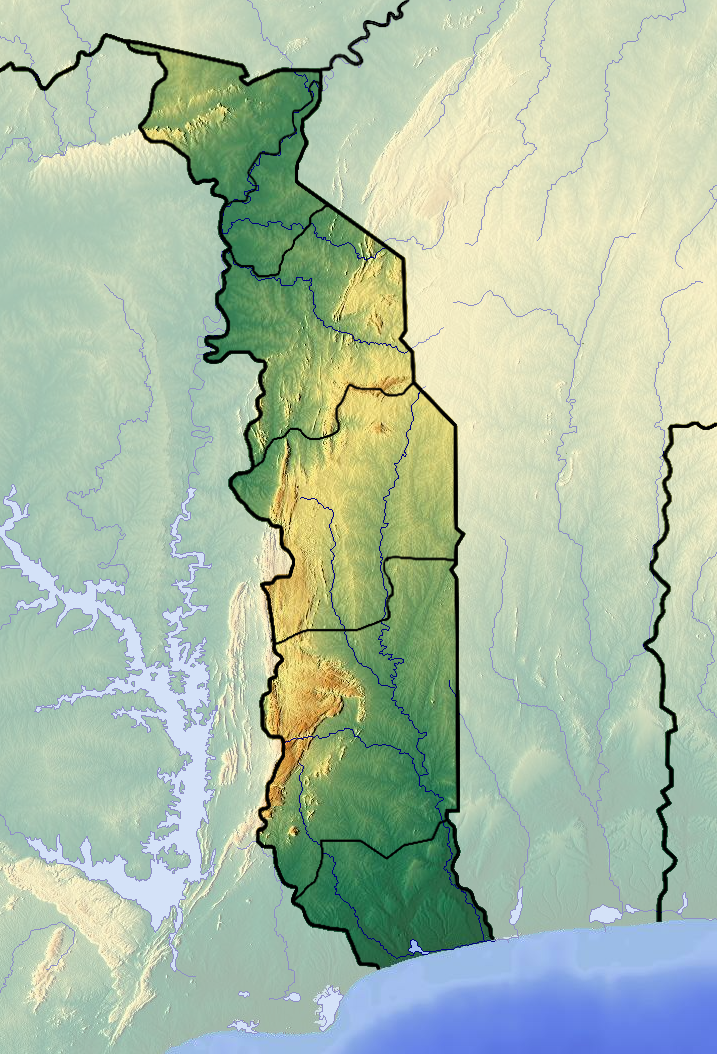
Fossiliferous stratigraphic units in Togo
Tabligbo Limestone

This is a list of fossiliferous stratigraphic units in Togo.

== List of fossiliferous stratigraphic units ==
Formation	Period	Fossils	Notes
Tabligbo Limestone	Thanetian	Eponides pseudoelevatus, Lenticulina midwayensis, Neonesidea illaroides, Paracypris sokotoensis, P. trosliensis, Platella ewekoroensis, Togocyamus seefriedi, Trachyleberis teiskotensis, Soudanella laciniosa, Bairdia sp., Bythocypris sp., Cibicides sp., Discorbis sp., Eponides sp., Lithothamnion sp., Morozovella sp., Operculina sp., Quinqueloculina sp., Ranikothalia sp., Textularia sp., Ostreidae indet.	

== See also ==
- Lists of fossiliferous stratigraphic units in Africa
- Geology of Togo
