= List of fossiliferous stratigraphic units in Croatia =

Fossiliferous stratigraphic units in Croatia
Promina Formation
Foraminiferal Limestones Formation
Pučišća Formation
Rasotica Formation
Gornji Humac Formation
Kanfanar Formation
Porec Formation
Hauptdolomit Formation
Neoschwagerina Beds Formation

This is a list of fossiliferous stratigraphic units in Croatia.

== List of fossiliferous stratigraphic units ==
Formation	Period	Notes
Promina Formation	Bartonian	
Foraminiferal Limestones Formation	Middle Eocene	
Pučišća Formation	middle Campanian	
Rasotica Formation	Campanian	
Gornji Humac Formation	late Turonian-early Coniacian	
Kanfanar Formation	early Aptian	
Porec Formation	late Tithonian	
Hauptdolomit Formation	Rhaetian	
Neoschwagerina Beds Formation	Roadian	

== See also ==
- Lists of fossiliferous stratigraphic units in Europe
  - List of fossiliferous stratigraphic units in Bosnia and Herzegovina
  - List of fossiliferous stratigraphic units in Hungary
  - List of fossiliferous stratigraphic units in Italy
  - List of fossiliferous stratigraphic units in Serbia
  - List of fossiliferous stratigraphic units in Slovenia
