= List of fossiliferous stratigraphic units in Georgia =

List of fossiliferous stratigraphic units in Georgia may refer to"

- List of fossiliferous stratigraphic units in Georgia (country)
- List of fossiliferous stratigraphic units in Georgia (U.S. state)
