= List of fossiliferous stratigraphic units in Mauritania =

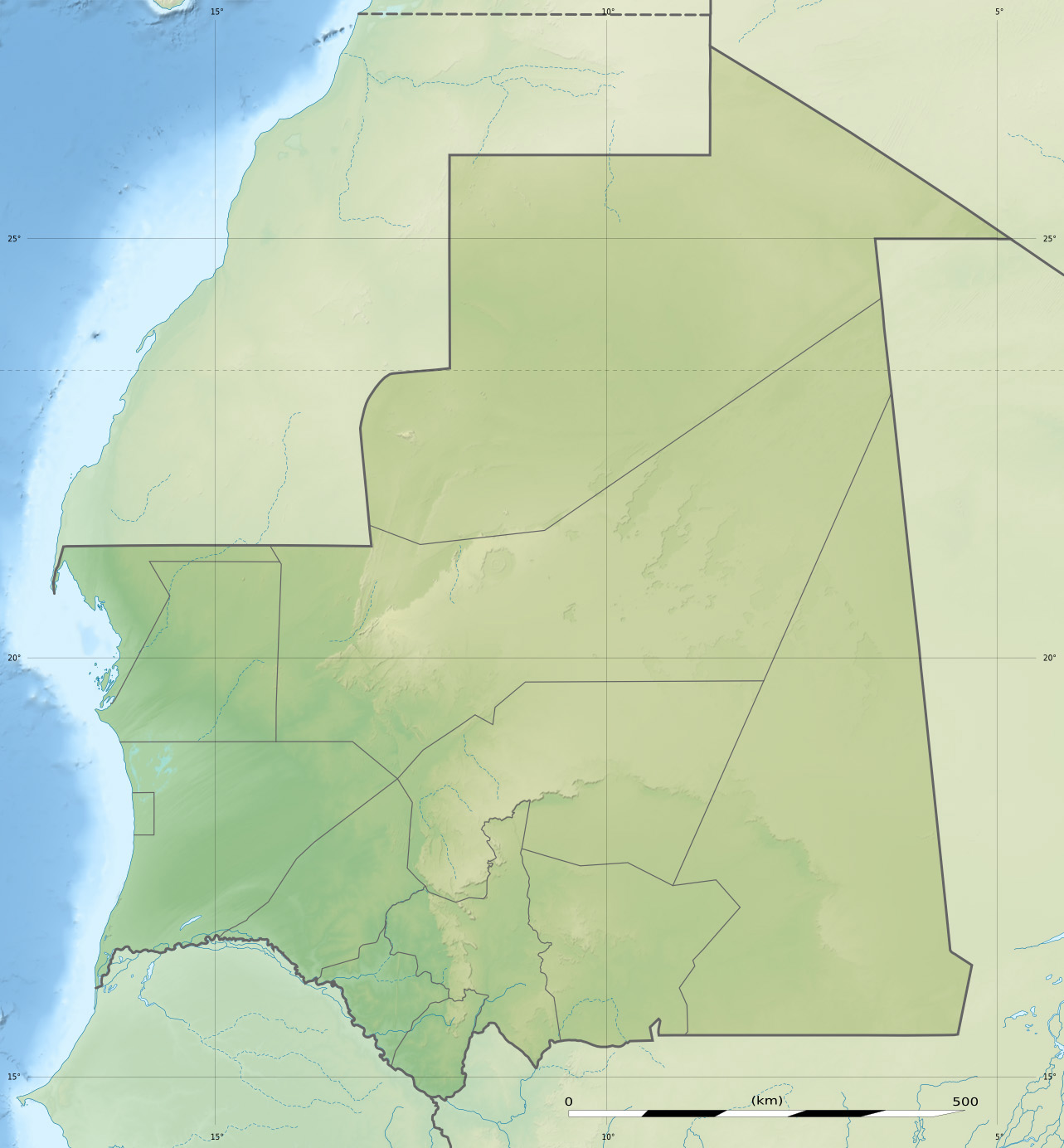
Fossiliferous stratigraphic units in Mauritania
Aratane Group

This is a list of fossiliferous stratigraphic units in Mauritania.

Group	Member	Period	Notes
Aratane Group		Givetian	
Aratane Group	Guelb Makhsar scolithus Sandstone	Llandovery	

== See also ==
- Lists of fossiliferous stratigraphic units in Africa
  - List of fossiliferous stratigraphic units in Mali
  - List of fossiliferous stratigraphic units in Senegal
  - List of fossiliferous stratigraphic units in Western Sahara
- Geology of Mauritania
