= Aturobatis =

Aturobatis Temporal range: Ypresian– Priabonian

Scientific classification
- Domain: Eukaryota
- Kingdom: Animalia
- Phylum: Chordata
- Class: Chondrichthyes
- Subclass: Elasmobranchii
- Order: Myliobatiformes
- Suborder: Myliobatoidei
- Genus: †Aturobatis; Adnet, 2006

Aturobatis is an extinct genus of Myliobatiform ray from the Eocene epoch. It contains a single described species, A. aquensis; however, the range of variation in this species is not well understood and it is unclear whether all specimens attributed to the genus are the same species. It is also unknown to which family this genus belongs. The type locality is the Lutetian of southern France. This genus is also known from the Ypresian of the United States, the Lutetian Lisbon Formation of Alabama, and the Priabonian Samlat Formation of Dakhla, Morocco.
