= List of fossiliferous stratigraphic units in Cameroon =

Fossiliferous stratigraphic units in Cameroon
Logbadjeck Formation
Mungo River Formation
Igumale Formation
Koum Formation

This is a list of fossiliferous stratigraphic units in Cameroon.

| Formation | Member | Period | Notes |
|---|---|---|---|
| Logbadjeck Formation | | Coniacian-Early Campanian | |
| Mungo River Formation | | Late Turonian-Santonian | |
| Koum Formation | Grés de Gaba | Aptian-Albian | |
| Koum Formation | Mbissirri | Aptian-Albian | |

== See also ==
- Lists of fossiliferous stratigraphic units in Africa
  - List of fossiliferous stratigraphic units in Gabon
- Geology of Cameroon
