= Waimanalo Formation =

Geologic formation in Hawaii

- Stratigraphic range: Neogene
- Type: Formation

Location
- Region: Hawaii
- Country: United States

The Waimanalo Formation is a geologic formation in Hawaii. It preserves fossils dating back to the Neogene period.

== See also ==
- List of fossiliferous stratigraphic units in Hawaii
- Paleontology in Hawaii
