= List of fossiliferous stratigraphic units in Ghana =

Fossiliferous stratigraphic units in Ghana
Apollonian Formation
Takoradi Shales

This is a list of fossiliferous stratigraphic units in Ghana.

Group	Formation	Period	Notes
	Apollonian Formation	Aptian-Early Cenomanian	
Sekondi Series	Takoradi Shales	Carboniferous	

== See also ==
- Lists of fossiliferous stratigraphic units in Africa
  - List of fossiliferous stratigraphic units in Ivory Coast
- Geology of Ghana
