= Geology of Albania =

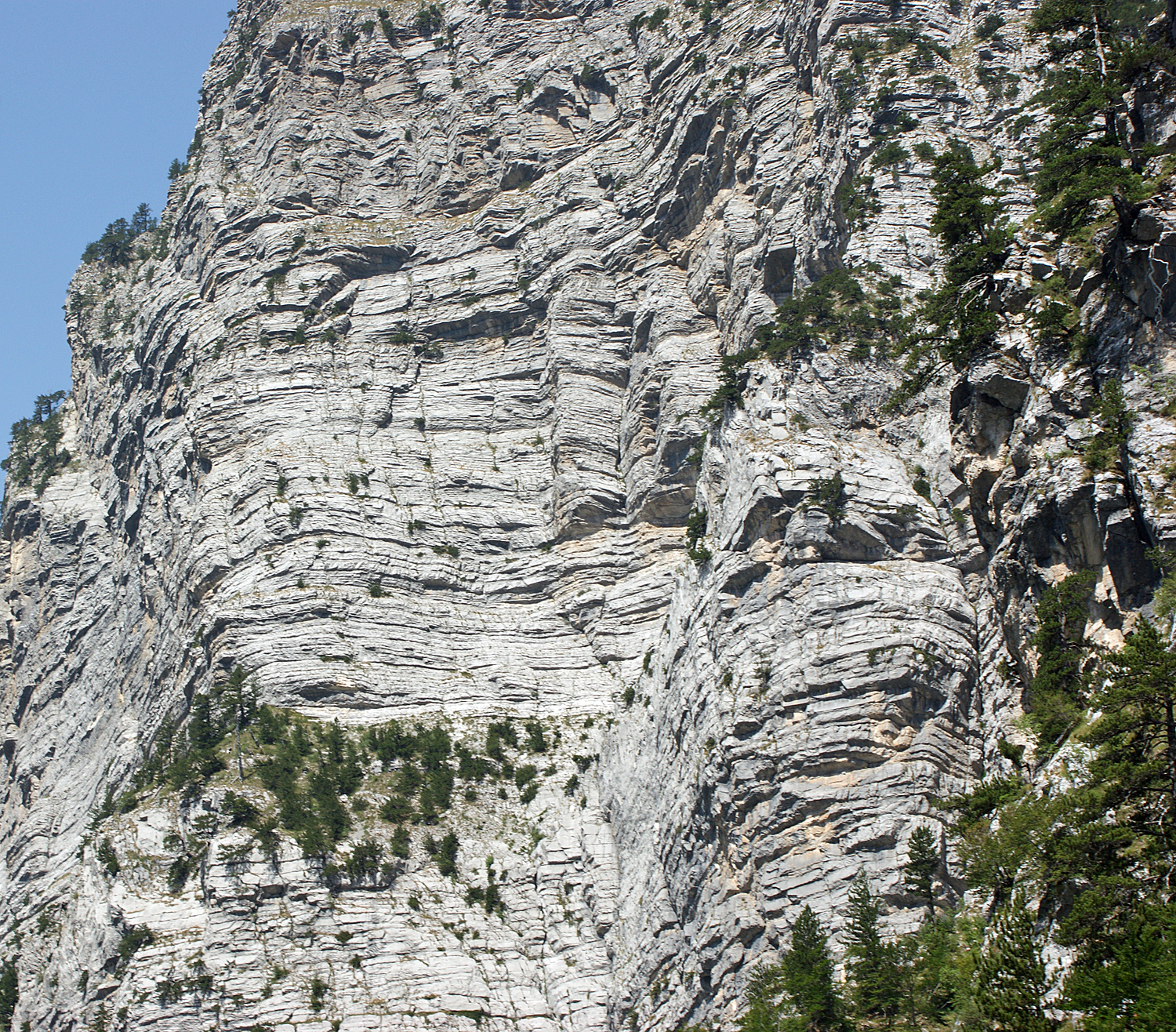
Rock outcrop at Theth

The geology of Albania is a term that embodies the geological history of Albania. The Albanides represent the main geological structures on the territory of the country. They belong to the Alpide belt and stretches between the Dinarides in north and the Hellenides in south within the Mediterranean belt.

== See also ==
- Environment of Albania
- Geography of Albania
- List of fossiliferous stratigraphic units in Albania
