= List of fossiliferous stratigraphic units in Ivory Coast =

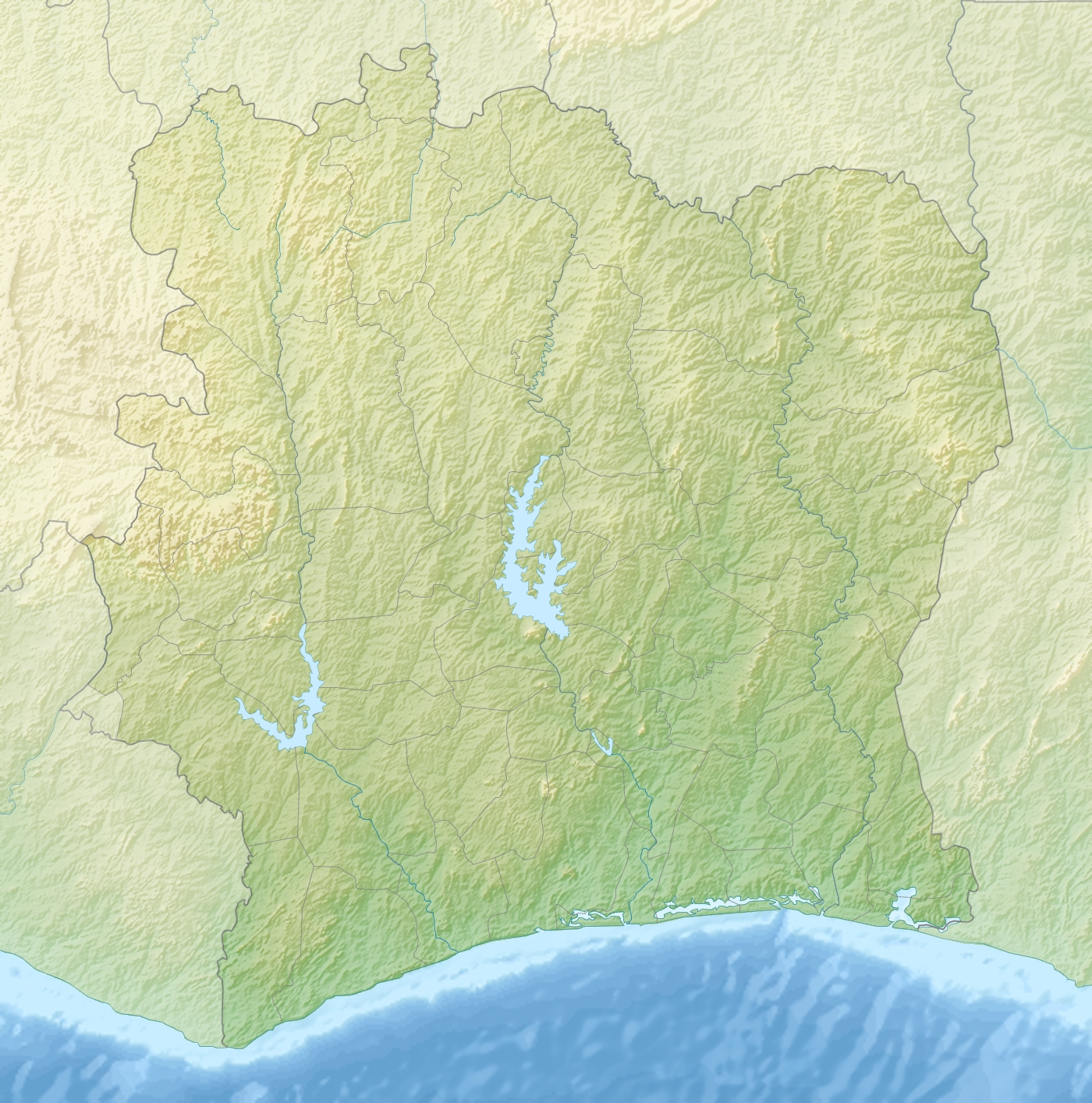
Fossiliferous stratigraphic units in Ivory Coast
Falaises de Fresco Formation

This is a list of fossiliferous stratigraphic units in Ivory Coast.

Group	Formation	Period	Notes
	Lamto station	Quaternary	
	Falaises de Fresco Formation	Middle Paleocene	

== See also ==
- Lists of fossiliferous stratigraphic units in Africa
  - List of fossiliferous stratigraphic units in Ghana
  - List of fossiliferous stratigraphic units in Guinea
- Geology of Ivory Coast
