= List of fossiliferous stratigraphic units in Liechtenstein =

| Group or Formation | Period | Notes |
|---|---|---|
| Keuper Formation | Triassic | |

== See also ==
- Lists of fossiliferous stratigraphic units in Europe
