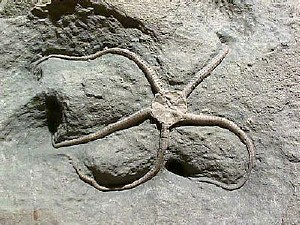
- Palaeocoma milleri, Lower Jurassic (Pliensbachian) England.

Scientific classification
- Kingdom: Animalia
- Phylum: Echinodermata
- Class: Ophiuroidea
- Order: Ophiurida
- Family: incertae sedis
- Genus: †Palaeocoma d'Orbigny, 1850

Species
- Palaeocoma escheri; Palaeocoma milleri; Palaeocoma raiblana

= Palaeocoma =

Palaeocoma Temporal range: Ladinian-Toarcian ~242–182 Ma

Extinct genus of brittle stars

Palaeocoma is an extinct genus of brittle stars that lived during the Middle Triassic to Early Jurassic Periods. Its fossils have been found in Europe.

== Distribution ==
The genus Palaeocoma was revised by Hess (1960, 1962) and is known from the Middle Triassic (Ladinian) to the Lower Jurassic (Toarcian) with occurrences reported from the United Kingdom, France, Luxembourg, Germany, Switzerland, Italy, and Serbia and Montenegro.

== Type species ==
Palaeocoma milleri (Phillips, 1829) [= P. gaveyi and P. egertoni according to Jaselli (2015, p. 192)], an Early Jurassic (Sinemurian and Pliensbachian) species recorded from France, Germany, Luxembourg, the United Kingdom and Lombardy in Italy.

=== Synonymised names ===
Ophioderma carinata Wright, 1866
Ophioderma egertoni (Broderip, 1840)
Ophioderma gaveyi Wright, 1854
Ophioderma milleri (Phillips, 1829)
Ophiura egertoni Broderip, 1840
Ophiura milleri Phillips, 1829
Ophiurella milleri (Phillips, 1829)
Palaeocoma egertoni (Broderip, 1840)
Palaeocoma gaveyi (Wright, 1854)

== Other species ==
- Palaeocoma escheri Herr, 1865 [= Ophiura ventrocarinata Quenstedt 1876] was redescribed by Hess (1960) and recorded from the Lower Lias Staffelegg Formation, of Schambelen near Mülligen in the Canton of Aargau of northern Switzerland. It occurs in the Hettangian, the earliest age and lowest stage of the Jurassic period and, specifically, the Psiloceras planorbis Ammonite Zone.
- Palaeocoma raiblana (Toula, 1887). This species has so far only been found in the Triassic Wengener Schichten Formation (Ladinian) of Budva in Serbia and Montenegro).

== Gallery ==
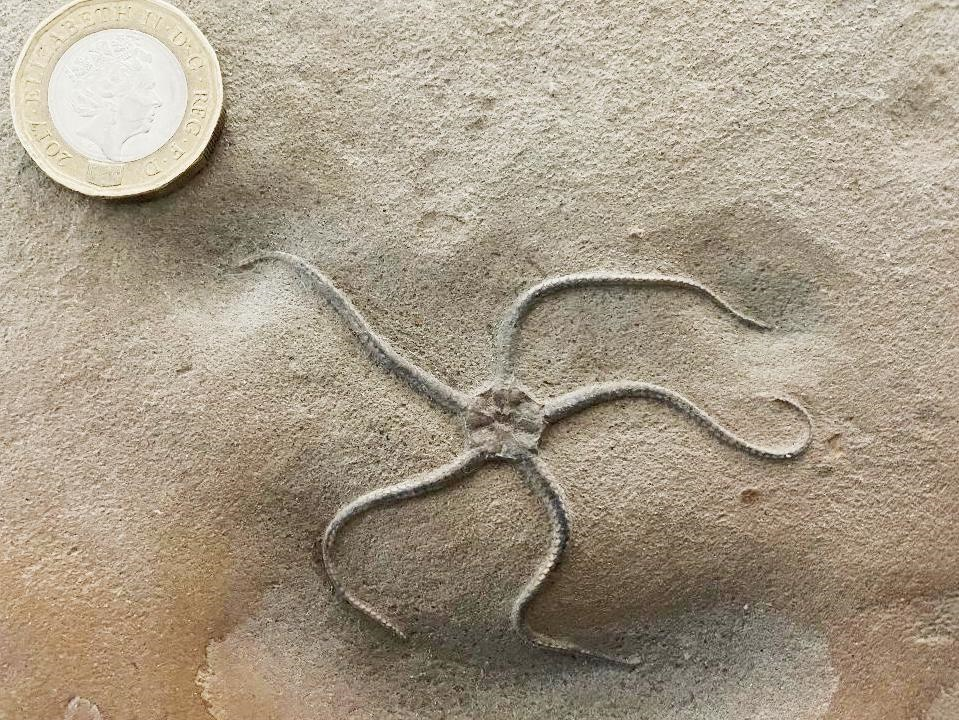
Palaeocoma milleri from the famous 'Starfish Bed' at Eype, UK. Coin diameter = 23.4mm.

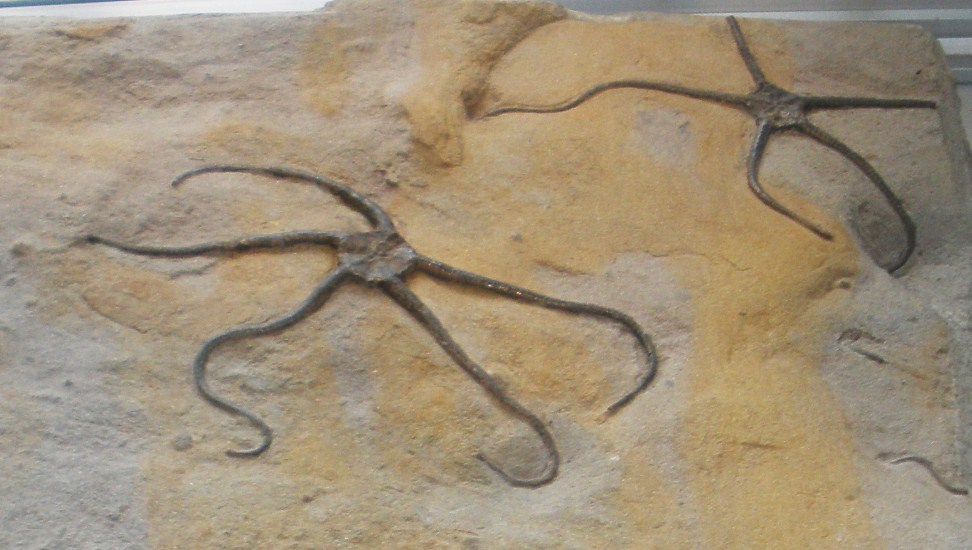
Palaeocoma milleri
