= List of fossiliferous stratigraphic units in Iceland =

Group or Formation	Period	Notes
Breidavik Formation	Neogene	
Brjánslækur-Seljá Formation	Neogene	
Hreðavatn–Stafholt Formation	Neogene	
Skarðsströnd–Mókollsdalur Formation	Neogene	
Tjornes Formation	Neogene	

== See also ==
- Lists of fossiliferous stratigraphic units in Europe
