= Kalur Chert =

Geologic formation in Albania

- Stratigraphic range: Late Bajorian-mid Oxfordian; ~170–160 Ma
- Type: Formation

Lithology
- Primary: Chert

Location
- Country: Albania
- Kalur Chert (Albania)

The Kalur Chert is a geologic formation in Albania. It contains fossils dated to the late Bajocian to mid Oxfordian of the Jurassic.

== See also ==
- List of fossiliferous stratigraphic units in Albania
  - Han-Bulog Formation
  - Vigla Formation
