= Luxembourg Sandstone =

European geological formation

- Stratigraphic range: Hettangian-Sinemurian; ~201–191 Ma
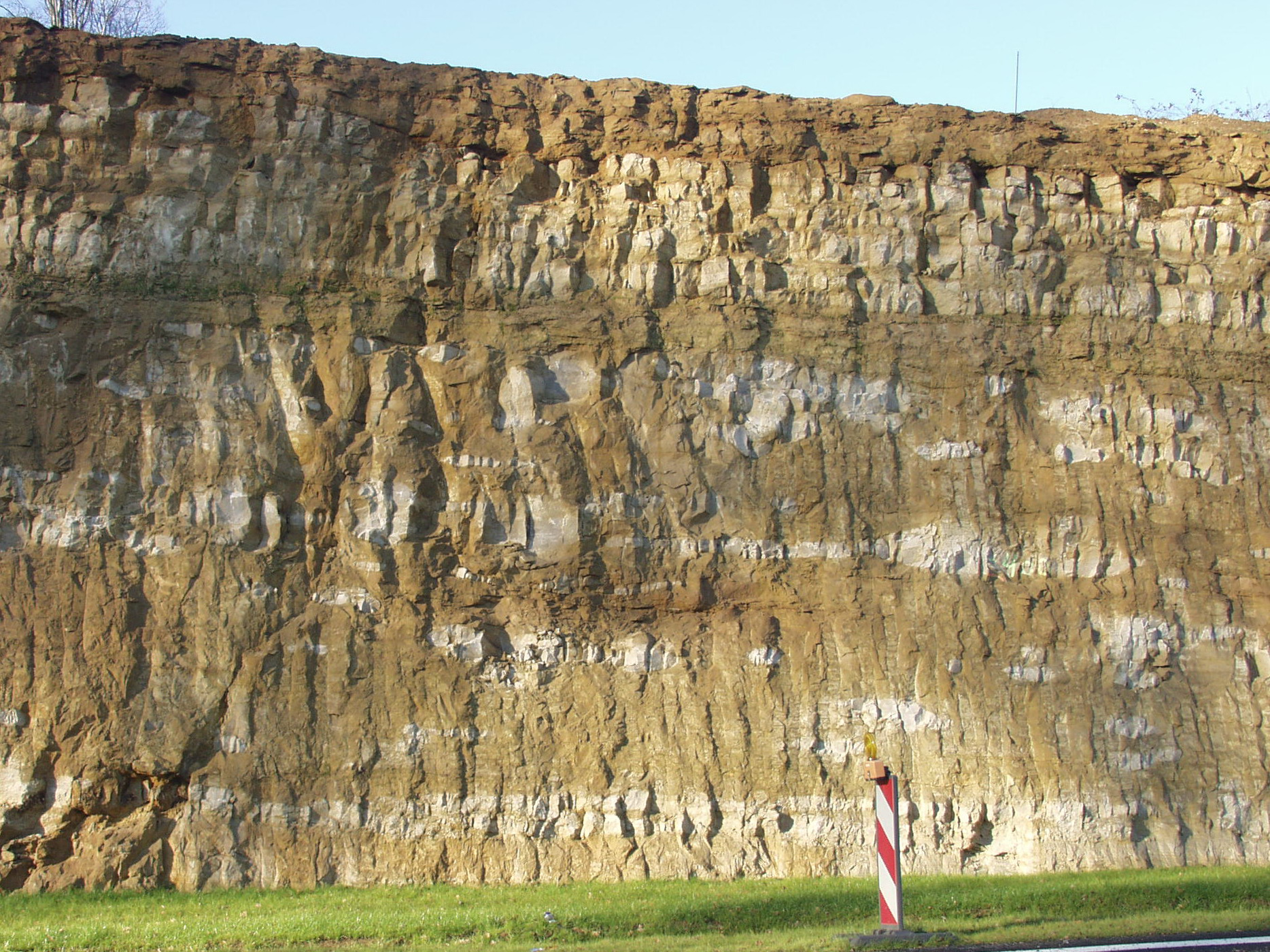
- Outcrop of Luxembourg sandstone on a road construction site north of Luxembourg City
- Type: Formation
- Sub-units: Grès de Bonnert
- Thickness: 100 m (330 ft) in central Luxembourg

Lithology
- Primary: Sandstone, limestone

Location
- Coordinates: 49.7°N 6.0°E
- Approximate paleocoordinates: 38.1°N 8.4°E
- Region: Mersch
- Country: Luxembourg

Type section
- Named for: Luxembourg
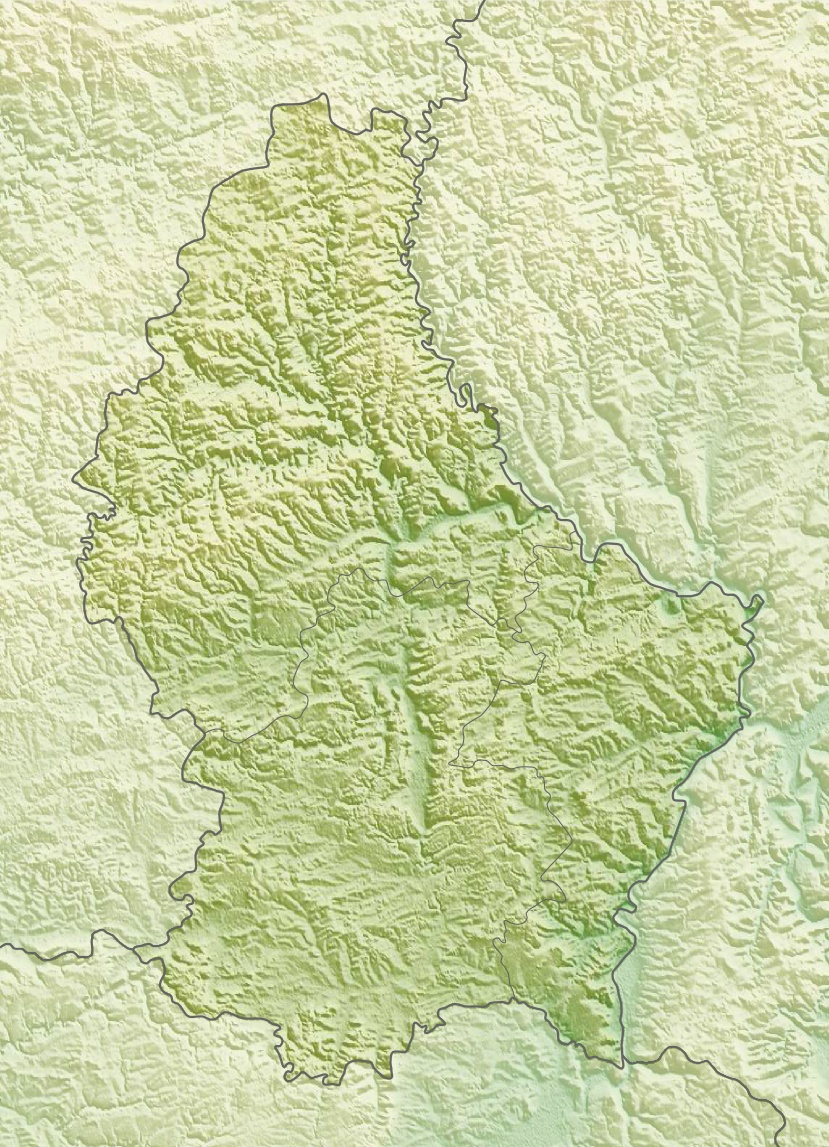
- Luxembourg Sandstone (Luxembourg)

The Luxembourg Sandstone (French: Grès de Luxembourg) is a geologic formation in Luxembourg. It exists along the eastern margin of the Paris Basin. Sandstone units continuous with the Luxembourg Sandstone also occur in France. It is Early Jurassic in age. It predominantly outcrops in a belt extending through south-central Luxembourg. It up to 100 metres thick and predominantly consists of carbonaceous poorly cemented sandstone and sandy limestone

== Fossil content ==
Among others, the following fossils were reported from the formation:

Reptiles

- Ichthyosaurus communis
- Temnodontosaurus sp.
- Neotheropoda indet.
- Plesiosauria indet.
- cf. Theropoda indet.

Fish

- Halonodon luxembourgensis
- Hybodontidae indet.

Gastropods

- Angulariopsis nivernensis
- Bourguetia bipartita
- Brouchilda laevigata
- B. mulleri
- Globularia delsatei
- Globulocerithium gallaense
- Kaimella tenuilineata
- Microschiza pauciornata
- Oonia feidtorum
- O. haasi
- Pleurotomaria cognata
- P. hennocquii
- P. hettangiensis
- P. wanderbachi
- Ptychomphalus caepa
- P. wehenkeli
- Scurriopsis (Hennocquia) hettangiensis
- Scurriopsis (Scurriopsis) schmidti
- Tangarilda darestei
- Trochotoma clypeus
- Turritelloidea? bockfielsensis

== See also ==
- List of fossiliferous stratigraphic units in Luxembourg
