= List of fossiliferous stratigraphic units in Luxembourg =

| Group or Formation | Period | Notes |
|---|---|---|
| Calcaire d'Audun Formation | Jurassic | |
| Grés de Luxembourg Formation | Jurassic | |
| Luxembourg Sandstone Formation | Jurassic | |
| Marnes et Calcaires de Strassen Formation | Jurassic | |
| Schistes bitumineux | Early Jurassic (Toarcian) | |
| Steinmergel Formation | Triassic | |
| Strassen Formation | Jurassic | |

== See also ==
- Lists of fossiliferous stratigraphic units in Europe
