= List of fossiliferous stratigraphic units in Angola =

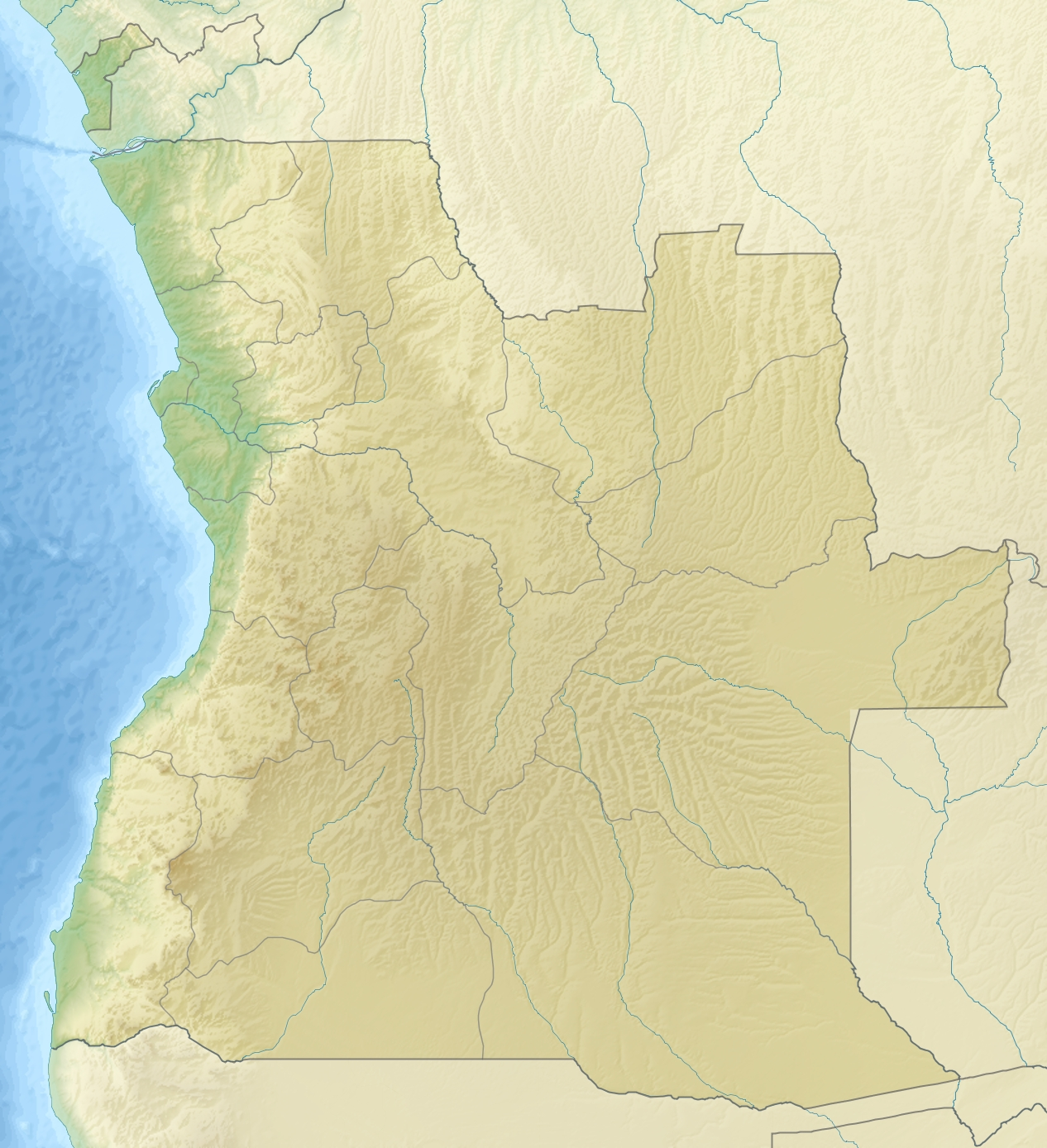
Fossiliferous stratigraphic units in Angola
Neogene
Paleogene
Late Cretaceous
Early Triassic

This is a list of fossiliferous stratigraphic units in Angola.

== List of fossiliferous stratigraphic units ==
Group	Formation	Period	Notes
	Luanda Formation	Late Miocene-Pliocene	
	Quimbriz Formation	Miocene	
	Quifangondo Formation	Eocene	
	Landana Formation	Selandian	
	Teba Formation	Turonian-Campanian	
	N'Golome Marl	Late Coniacian	
	Itombe Formation	Turonian	
Cassange Group	Camadas Com Peixes Formation	Early Triassic	

Itombe formation was considered Turonian in age, but new data suggests to be Coniacian.

== See also ==
- Lists of fossiliferous stratigraphic units in Africa
  - List of fossiliferous stratigraphic units in the Democratic Republic of the Congo
  - List of fossiliferous stratigraphic units in Namibia
  - List of fossiliferous stratigraphic units in Zambia
  - List of fossiliferous stratigraphic units in Zimbabwe
- Geology of Angola
