= Han-Bulog Formation =

Geologic formation in Albania

- Stratigraphic range: Olenekian-Anisian; ~250–245 Ma
- Type: Formation

Location
- Country: Albania
- Han-Bulog Formation (Albania)

The Han-Bulog Formation is a geologic formation in Albania. It contains fossils dated to the Olenekian to Anisian of the Triassic period.

== See also ==
- List of fossiliferous stratigraphic units in Albania
  - Kalur Chert
  - Vigla Formation
