= List of fossiliferous stratigraphic units in Gabon =

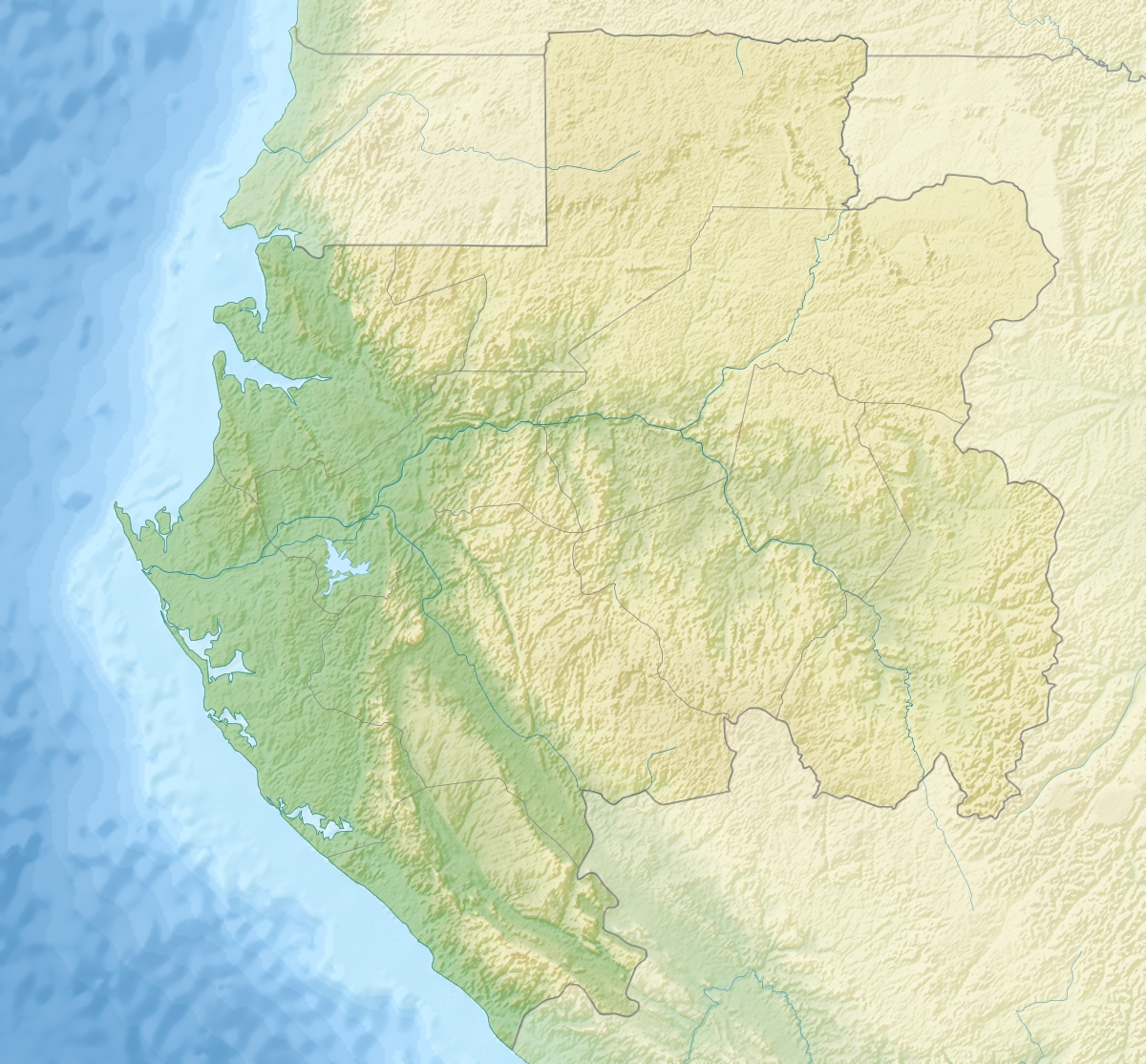
Fossiliferous stratigraphic units in Gabon
Anguille Formation
Francevillian B Formation

This is a list of fossiliferous stratigraphic units in Gabon.

== List of fossiliferous stratigraphic units ==
Formation	Period	Fossils	Notes
Anguille Formation	Coniacian	Acanthocardia cf. denticulata, Agelasina plenodonta, Aphrodina dutrugei, A. gabonensis, Atrina laticostata, Granocardium productum, Plagiostoma pseudohoernesi, Protocardia cf. pauli, ?Anofia sp.	
Stanley Pool Formation			
Francevillian B Formation	Paleoproterozoic	Francevillian biota	

== See also ==
- Lists of fossiliferous stratigraphic units in Africa
  - List of fossiliferous stratigraphic units in Cameroon
- Geology of Gabon
