= List of fossiliferous stratigraphic units in the Democratic Republic of the Congo =

Fossiliferous stratigraphic units in the Democratic Republic of the Congo
Albertine Group
Semliki Group
Sinda Beds
Landana Formation
Lualaba Group
Kwango Group
Permian

This is a list of fossiliferous stratigraphic units in the Democratic Republic of the Congo.

Group	Formation	Period	Notes
Albertine Group	Nyabusosi Formation	Gelasian	
Albertine Group	Nyakabingo Formation	Piacenzian	
Semliki Group	Lusso Beds	Pliocene	
	Sinda Beds	Late Miocene-Pliocene	
	Landana Formation	Thanetian-Ypresian	
Lualaba Group		Cenomanian	
Kwango Group		Late Jurassic	
Upper Lukuga Group	Transition Formation	Kungurian	
Upper Lukuga Group	Couches de houille Formation	Sakmarian-Artinskian	
Lower Lukuga Group	Schistes noires Formation	Asselian-Sakmarian	
Lower Lukuga Group	Schistes noirs de Walikale Formation	Asselian	
Ecca Group		Asselian	

== See also ==
- Lists of fossiliferous stratigraphic units in Africa
  - List of fossiliferous stratigraphic units in Angola
  - List of fossiliferous stratigraphic units in Zambia
- Geology of the Democratic Republic of the Congo
