= List of fossiliferous stratigraphic units in Zambia =

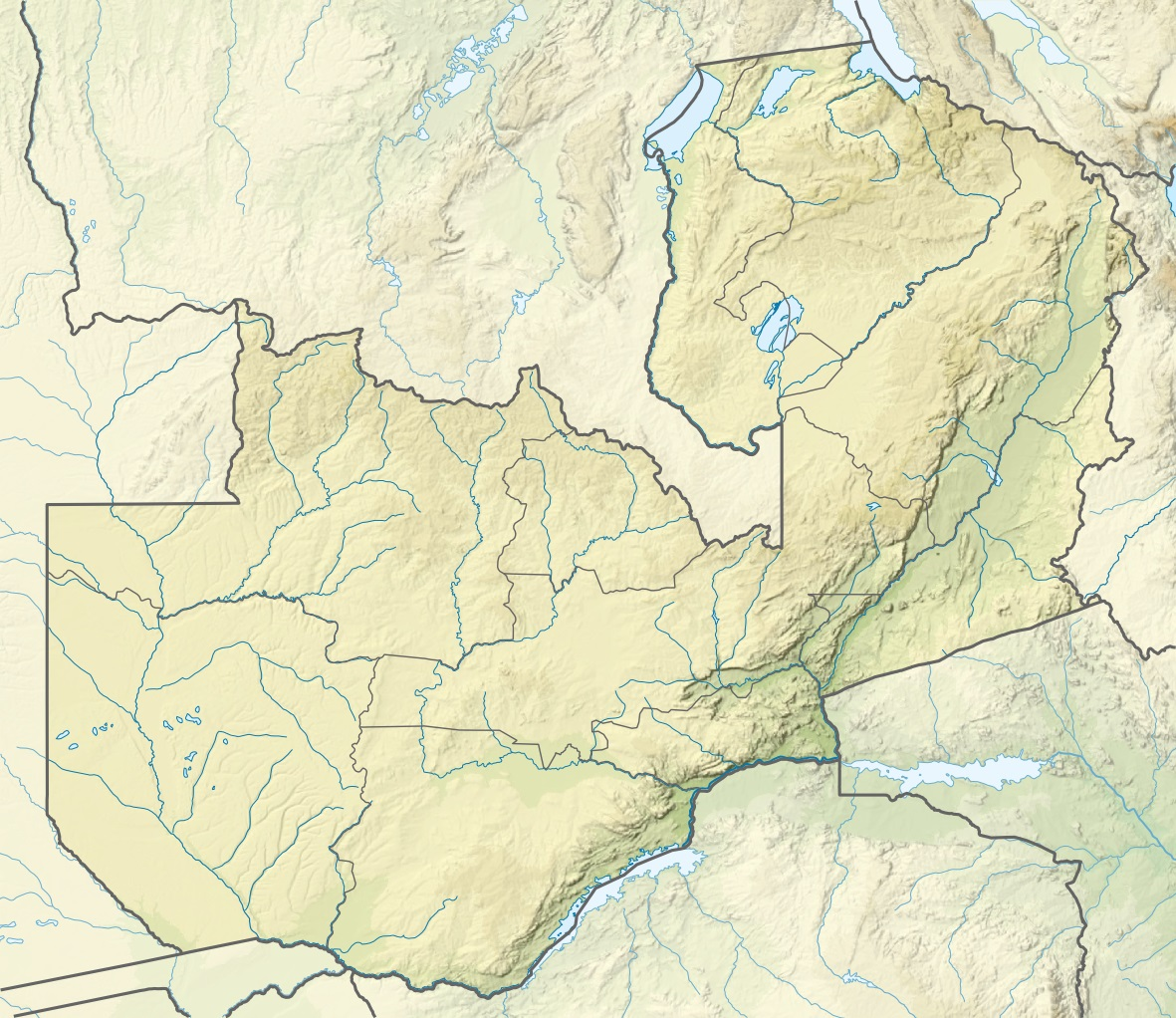
Fossiliferous stratigraphic units in Zambia
Ntawere Formation
Madumabisa Mudstone
Luwumbu Coal

This is a list of fossiliferous stratigraphic units in Zambia.

Group	Formation	Period	Notes
	Ntawere Formation	Anisian	
Beaufort Group	Madumabisa Mudstone	Capitanian-Wuchiapingian	
Ecca Group	Luwumbu Coal	Guadalupian	

== See also ==
- Lists of fossiliferous stratigraphic units in Africa
  - List of fossiliferous stratigraphic units in Angola
  - List of fossiliferous stratigraphic units in Botswana
  - List of fossiliferous stratigraphic units in the Democratic Republic of the Congo
  - List of fossiliferous stratigraphic units in Malawi
  - List of fossiliferous stratigraphic units in Mozambique
  - List of fossiliferous stratigraphic units in Namibia
  - List of fossiliferous stratigraphic units in Zimbabwe
- Geology of Zambia
