= Vigla Formation =

Geologic formation in Albania and Greece

- Stratigraphic range: Late Barremian-mid Albian; ~123–100 Ma
- Type: Formation
- Sub-units: Dercourt Member

Lithology
- Primary: Chert
- Other: Limestone, claystone

Location
- Coordinates: 40.0°N 20.1°E
- Approximate paleocoordinates: 20.9°N 21.3°E
- Country: Albania; Greece
- Vigla Formation (Albania)

The Vigla Formation is an Lower Cretaceous geologic formation found mostly in Albania and Greece.

During the Late Cretaceous Epoch, the uplifted margins of grabens caused erosion of the pre-existing deposits of the Vigla Formation.

== Fossil content ==
The Vigla Formation contains radiolarian fossils dated to the late Barremian to middle Albian of the Cretaceous period.

=== Polycystina ===
Color key: Taxon / Reclassified taxon / Taxon falsely reported as present / Dubious taxon or junior synonym / Ichnotaxon / Ootaxon / Morphotaxon	Notes; Uncertain or tentative taxa are in small text; ~~crossed out~~ taxa are discredited.

Name	Species	Locality	Material	Notes	Reference
Acaeniotyle	umbilicata	Panaya PAN R24 MG 102			
Triactoma	cf. hybum	Panaya PAN R24			
Triactoma	hybum	MG 102			
Triactoma	cf. paronai	Panaya PAN R27 PAN R28			
Angulobracchia	portmanni	Panaya PAN R24 MG 102 Panaya PAN R27			
Crucella	spp.	Panaya PAN R24 Panaya PAN R27 Paliambela TD-9			
Crucella	cf. messinae	SO-PAL 107 MG 108			
Crolanium	puga	Panaya PAN R24			
Crolanium	cf. cuneatum	PAN R28 Paliambela TD-9			
Crolanium	spineum	Paliambela TD-9 Paliambela TD-10			
Pseudoeucyrtis	hanni	Panaya PAN R24 SO-PAL 21 MG 51 MG 102 Panaya PAN R27			
Thanarla	brouweri	Panaya PAN R24 SO-PAL 21 MG 51 Mg 102 SO-PAL 102 SO-PAL 128 MG 108 Panaya PAN R27 PAN R28 PAN R29 Paliambela TD-9 Paliambela TD-10 Paliambela TD-11			
Thanarla	pseudodecora	SO-PAL 21 MG 51 Mg 102			
Thanarla	pulchra	SO-PAL 107 SO-PAL 102			
Thanarla	praeveneta	SO-PAL 107 SO-PAL 102 SO-PAL 128			
Thanarla	spoletoensis	Paliambela TD-11			
Archaeodictyomitra	lacrimula	Panaya PAN R24 MG 51 MG 102			
Archaeodictyomitra	vulgaris	MG 102 SO-PAL 102			
Archaeodictyomitra	montisserei	SO-PAL 107 SO-PAL 102 SO-PAL 128 SO-PAL 111 MG 108			
Dictyromitra	communis	Panaya PAN R24			
Dictyromitra	gracilis	Panaya PAN R27 Paliambela TD-11			
Dictyromitra	montisserei	Panaya PAN R27 PAN R28 PAN R29 Paliambela TD-9 Paliambela TD-10 Paliambela TD-11			
Becus	helenae	MG 102			
Halesium	sp.	SO-PAL 107 SO-PAL 202			
Halesium	cf. diacanthum	PAN R28			
Dactyliodiscus	cf. lenticulatus	SO-PAL 102 SO-PAL 111			
Acaeniotyle	amplissima	SO-PAL 102 Panaya PAN R27 PAN R28			
Acaeniotyle	cf. tribulosa	PAN R28 Paliambela TD-9			
Acastea	diaphorogona	SO-PAL 102 SO-PAL 111 PAN R28			
Dicerosaturnalis	amissus	SO-PAL 102			
Stichomitra	communis	SO-PAL 102 SO-AL 128 MG 107 MG 108 Paliambela TD-8 PAN R29 Paliambela TD-9 Paliambela TD-10 Paliambela TD-11			
Pessagnobrachia	cf. fabianii	SO-PAL 128			
Acanthocircus	levis	SO-PAL 128			
Ultranapora	cf. praespinifera	SO-PAL 128		Now classified as Napora, a synonym.	
Napora		SO-PAL 128			
Mita	gracilis	SO-PAL 128 MG 108			
Obeliscoites	perspicuous	SO-PAL 111			
Obeliscoites	cf. perspicuous	Paliambela TD-8			
Pseudodicyomitra	cf. carpatica	Panaya PAN R24 SO-PAL 21 MG 102			
Pseudodicyomitra	cf. lodogaensis	SO-PAL 107 PAN R28 Paliambela TD-9			
Pseudodicyomitra	hornatissima	Panaya PAN R27			
Pseudodicyomitra	pentacolaensis	Paliambela TD-9 Paliambela TD-10			
Archaeospongoprunum	cf. cortinaensis	Panaya PAN R27			
Staurasphaera	longispina	Panaya PAN R27 PAN R28			
Hiscocapsa	asseni	Panaya PAN R27			
Crolanium	spineum	Panaya PAN R27			
Acanthocircus	cf. angustus	PAN R28			
Acanthocircus	cf. multidentatus	Paliambela TD-11			
Holocryptocanium	barbui	PAN R29			
Xitus	mclaughlini	Paliambela TD-10 Paliambela TD-11			

== See also ==
- List of fossiliferous stratigraphic units in Albania
  - Kalur Chert
  - Han-Bulog Formation
- List of fossiliferous stratigraphic units in Greece
