= List of fossiliferous stratigraphic units in Guinea =

Fossiliferous stratigraphic units in Guinea
Sangui Sandstone
Bambaya Sandstone

This is a list of fossiliferous stratigraphic units in Guinea.

Group	Formation	Period	Notes
	Sangui Sandstone	Ludlow	
Telimele Group	Bambaya Sandstone	Ludlow	

== See also ==
- Lists of fossiliferous stratigraphic units in Africa
  - List of fossiliferous stratigraphic units in Ivory Coast
  - List of fossiliferous stratigraphic units in Mali
  - List of fossiliferous stratigraphic units in Senegal
- Geology of Guinea
