= List of fossiliferous stratigraphic units in Bulgaria =

| Group or Formation | Period | Notes |
|---|---|---|
| Babino Formation | Triassic | |
| Bilka Formation | Jurassic | |
| Cerkoviste Formation | Jurassic | |
| Djula Formation | Jurassic | |
| Kajlâka Formation | Cretaceous | |
| Karavelyovo Formation | Jurassic | |
| Lovech Urgonian Group/Balgarene Formation | Cretaceous | |
| Lovech Urgonian Group/Emen Formation | Cretaceous | |
| Lovech Urgonian Group/Smochan Formation | Cretaceous | |
| Milanovo Formation | Triassic | |
| Ozirovo Formation | Jurassic | |
| Polaten Formation | Jurassic | |
| Radomir Formation | Triassic | |
| Sanadinovo Formation | Cretaceous | |
| Slivnitsa Formation | Cretaceous, Jurassic | |
| Sokolovskaya Series Formation | Jurassic | |

== See also ==
- Lists of fossiliferous stratigraphic units in Europe
