= Wengener Schichten Formation =

Geologic formation in Montenegro

- Stratigraphic range: Ladinian; ~242–235 Ma
- Type: Formation

Lithology
- Primary: Mudstone

Location
- Coordinates: 42.3°N 18.9°E
- Approximate paleocoordinates: 2.0°N 25.2°E
- Country: Montenegro
- Wengener Schichten Formation (Montenegro)

The Wengener Schichten Formation is a geologic formation in Montenegro. It preserves bivalve and brittle star fossils dating back to the Ladinian of the Triassic period.

== Fossil content ==
The following fossils were reported from the formation:

- Bivalves
  - Ostreida
    - Halobiidae
      - Daonella lommeli
- Ophiuroidea
  - Ophiurida
    - Ophiodermatidae
      - Palaeocoma raiblana

== See also ==
- List of fossiliferous stratigraphic units in Montenegro
