= Geology of Somalia =

The geology of Somalia is built on more than 700 million year old igneous and metamorphic crystalline basement rock, which outcrops at some places in northern Somalia. These ancient units are covered in thick layers of sedimentary rock formed in the last 200 million years and influenced by the rifting apart of the Somali Plate and the Arabian Plate. The geology of Somaliland, the de facto independent country recognized as part of Somalia, is to some degree better studied than that of Somalia as a whole. Instability related to the Somali Civil War and previous political upheaval has limited geologic research in places while heightening the importance of groundwater resources for vulnerable populations

== Stratigraphy and geologic history ==
The oldest rock units in Somalia date back over 700 million years to the Proterozoic, forming the crystalline basement rock of northern Somalia. Many rock units date to the Mesozoic and the current Cenozoic eons.

=== Proterozoic ===
Northern Somalia preserves the best examples of Proterozoic rocks. As basement rocks, they form a composite terrane, with younger rocks in the east and older rocks in the west. The older rocks pre-date the Pan-African orogeny and were affected by both igneous and metamorphic activity 840, 800 to 760 and 720 million years ago.

The early geology of Somalia is divided into four major events. The Qabri Bahar Complex formed in the Paleoproterozoic through the Mesoproterozoic with mafic and granitoid units, as well as rocks metamorphosed to granulite grade (part of the concept of metamorphic facies). Some geologists propose that the Qabri Bahar complex may preserve rocks from before the Pan-African orogeny. Major Event II, more than 700 million years ago, marked deformation, partial melting (also known as anataxis) and rocks metamorphosed up to amphibolite grade.

Major Event III happened 700 to 640 million years ago, bringing crustal thinning and extension, mafic volcanism in the Abdulkadir complex and Mait complex, regional heating, metamorphism and the emplacement of gabbro and syenite through the thinned crust. Major Event IV continued for 100 million years, from 600 to 500 million years ago, spanning into the Paleozoic Era of the Phanerozoic Eon. Granites were emplaced and the deposition of the low-grade, metasedimentary Inda Ad sequence occurred, followed by more deformation and regional heating.

The sequence of events in Somalia in the Proterozoic are correlated with the Arabian-Nubian Shield to the north, which experienced igneous activity related to subduction and witnessed the formation of marginal basins and island arcs.

=== Mesozoic (251-66 million years ago) ===
In the Early Jurassic, the supercontinent Gondwana, which included Africa, began to break apart. The marine transgression of the Tethys Ocean flooded large parts of East Africa and Arabia and new sedimentary rock units were deposited. In the west of Somalia, the Cretaceous at the end of the Mesozoic brought crustal upwarping, which is preserved in the Yesomma Sandstone.

Two major sedimentary basins began to form in Somalia during the Mesozoic, the Somali Coastal Basin and the Luuq-Mandera Basin, both filled with up to five kilometers of sedimentary rock. The basins formed due to the movements of India, Madagascar and East Africa and the opening of the Indian Ocean. Research on the basins came out of geophysical surveys in search of oil. Much of the seven kilometers of sedimentary rock in the Somali Coastal Basin was laid down in Jurassic and Cretaceous. In the Luuq-Mandera Basin, oil exploration found Late Triassic to Early Jurassic clastic sediments, evaporite and carbonate deposits, overlain by shales from the Tethys marine transgression. The Late Jurassic through the Cretaceous left marl and ammonite fossils, from an open sea environment, followed by shales and belemnite fossils from an epicontinental sea.

The two basins are separated by the Bur Region, where crystalline basement rock from the Proterozoic comes close to the surface. In the Bur Region, basement rock only outcrops as a few small hills. Even though the region covers 30,000 square kilometers, most basement rock remains hidden by one to 30 meters of recently eroded and unconsolidated sediments.

Geologic research has found that there are two rock units in the Bur Region, the Olontole Complex and Dinsor Complex. The Olontole Complex includes gneiss, migmatite, granulite facies amphibolite and quartzite, cross-cut by bodies of granitoid rock. The Dinsor Complex consists of metapsammite and metapelite, migmatite, iron-rich quartzite and marble. Rubidium-strontium dating indicates that the young granites and granitoids date to the Paleozoic.

=== Cenozoic (66 million years ago-present) ===
Sedimentation continued in the Cenozoic. Deposition of the Yesomma Sandstone continued until another regional marine transgression in the Middle Eocene. The opening of the Gulf of Aden and the uplift of the Somali Plateau created brackish basins, which filled with marine deposits in the Miocene and Oligocene. Outcrops of these rock units are limited to a few coastal areas in Somalia, but rapid faulting created offshore basins with up to two kilometers of sediments from the late Cenozoic.

Both the Luuq-Mandera Basin and the Somali Coastal Basin continued to fill with a mix of clastic sediments, marl and carbonates. Since the Late Cretaceous, uplift in these basins created lake depressions and formed the Jubba valley.

=== Cenozoic Tectonic Evolution (23 million years-present) ===
The formation of the Somali Plate began 60 million years ago and accelerated at the end of the Oligocene, approximately 23 million years ago. As the Arabian Plate and Somali Plate rifted apart, forming the Gulf of Aden through sea floor spreading in the Late Miocene, magma intruded between the two plates.

== Hydrogeology ==
At least 287 springs have been found in northern Somalia, where they are more common in karst aquifers. Ninety-five percent of Somalis get their drinking water from aquifers, although poor quality water often means that boreholes go abandoned.

The Eocene Karkar limestone, Auradu limestone and Taalex limestone are important karstic aquifers in Somaliland and Puntland, along with thick, unconsolidated sediment aquifers up to 100 meters thick formed in the past 2.5 million years of the Quaternary in wadi locations throughout the county. Fractured Pleistocene basalt flows, particularly near Las Dhure and Agabar have potential as aquifers. The Yesomma Sandstone in northern Somalia is a high productivity aquifer, but sandstones in the south remain poorly studied for groundwater potential.

Fourteen water utilities serve towns in Somaliland and Puntland, although at least 750,000 people on the outskirts of Hargeisa lack piped water.

== Natural resource geology ==
Mining is not a significant part of the economy of Somalia, with little extraction aside from sand, gravel and stone for construction. Small amounts of gypsum, limestone, sea salt and sepiolite were mined during the instability brought on by the ongoing Somali Civil War, although the conflict halted oil exploration which had taken place in the 1980s.
