= List of fossiliferous stratigraphic units in Estonia =

Group or Formation	Period	Notes
Adila Formation	Ordovician	
Aseri Formation	Ordovician	
Himmiste Beds Formation	Silurian	
Hirmuse Formation	Ordovician	
Juuru Formation	Silurian	
Jôhvi Formation	Ordovician	
Kahula Formation	Ordovician	
Kandle Formation	Ordovician	
Kandle Group/Väo Formation	Ordovician	
Kuldiga Formation	Ordovician	
Kõrgessaare Formation	Ordovician	
Körgekallas Formation	Ordovician	
Loo Beds Formation	Silurian	
Loobu Formation	Ordovician	
Lyckholm Formation	Ordovician	
Lyckholm Group/Korgessaare Formation	Ordovician	
Lyckholm Group/Korgessaare (F1b) Formation	Ordovician	
Moe Group/Adila Formation	Ordovician	
Paadla Formation	Silurian	
Pakri Formation	Ordovician	
Ragavere Formation	Ordovician	
Rootsikula Formation	Silurian	
Rägavere Formation	Ordovician	
Saunja Formation	Ordovician	
Sauvere Formation	Silurian	
Sauvere Beds Formation	Silurian	
Soru Formation	Cambrian	
Tatruse Group/Vasavere Formation	Ordovician	
Tiskres Formation	Cambrian	
Uduvere Formation	Silurian	
Uduvere Beds Formation	Silurian	
Vaginatumkalk Formation	Ordovician	
Vasalemma Formation	Ordovician	
Vesiku Beds Formation	Silurian	
Viita Beds Formation	Silurian	
Viivikonna Formation	Ordovician	
Vilsandi Formation	Silurian	
Voosi Formation	Cambrian	
Väo Formation	Ordovician	
Väo Group/Kõrgessaare Formation	Ordovician	
Äigu Formation	Silurian	
Ärina Formation	Ordovician	

== See also ==
- Lists of fossiliferous stratigraphic units in Europe
