= Porphyrit-Hornstein Formation =

Geologic formation in Montenegro

- Stratigraphic range: Ladinian; ~242–235 Ma
- Type: Formation
- Unit of: Becici Group

Location
- Coordinates: 42.5°N 18.9°E
- Approximate paleocoordinates: 2.1°N 25.3°E
- Country: Montenegro
- Porphyrit-Hornstein Formation (Montenegro)

The Porphyrit-Hornstein Formation is a geologic formation in Montenegro. It preserves bivalve fossils dating back to the Ladinian of the Triassic period.

== Fossil content ==
The following fossils were reported from the formation:

- Bivalves
  - Ostreida
    - Halobiidae
      - Daonella (Arzelella) indica
      - Daonella (Pichlerella) pichleri

== See also ==
- List of fossiliferous stratigraphic units in Montenegro
