= Geology of Mauritania =

The geology of Mauritania is built on more than two billion year old Archean crystalline basement rock in the Reguibat Shield of the West African Craton, a section of ancient and stable continental crust. Mobile belts and the large Taoudeni Basin formed and filled with sediments in the connection with the Pan-African orogeny mountain building event 600 million years ago and a subsequent orogeny created the Mauritanide Belt. In the last 251 million years, Mauritania has accumulated additional sedimentary rocks during periods of marine transgression and sea level retreat. The arid country is 50% covered in sand dunes and has extensive mineral resources, although iron plays the most important role in the economy.

== Stratigraphy, tectonics and geologic history ==
The oldest rocks in Mauritania date to the Archean, over two billion years old in the Reguibat Shield of the West African Craton. The extremely old crystalline basement rock of the shield is almost entirely Neoarchean age and metamorphosed to hornblende or granulite grade in the metamorphic facies sequence. These Saouda Series rocks include gneiss, with different endmembers enriched in leptynite garnet, hypersthene and sillimanite garnet, as well as pyroxene amphibolite, magnetite quartzites and marble. The Saouda Series is intruded by younger basalts, anorthosite and gabbros along with serpentinite.

Saouda Series rocks appear to be restite, the residual material left at a location after in situ granite production through intense metamorphism and are part of a larger group of anatectic and magmatic granites in the Rag el Abiod complex. In Mauritania, metamorphic and igneous crystalline basement rock is exposed as the Kenieba and Kayes inliers, sections of older rock surrounded by younger rock. They show signs of multiple phases of deformation and intrusion by tectonic and post-tectonic granites, dated at 2.05 billion years, lining up with the Eburnean orogeny. Geologists have found pebbles within microsyenites and microgranites, in a folded conglomerate, that form part of a metasedimentary unit, which may be the remnants of even older Archean rocks.

=== Proterozoic (2.5 billion-539 million years ago) ===
In the Neoproterozoic, the Pan-African orogeny began to form mobile belts across Africa. The Taoudeni Basin in Mauritania, Mali, Algeria, Burkina Faso, Guinea, Senegal and Guinea-Bissau began to form as a foreland basin to the surrounding mobile belts—a process that continued into the Paleozoic. Also known as the Bove Basin further south, the Taoudeni Basin is a slightly dipping sag basin filled with two to three kilometers of clastic sedimentary rocks. The rocks are grouped into three sequences. Sequence 1 deposited in the Middle Neoproterozoic and includes sandstones and carbonates formed from stromatolites. Supergroup 2 also dates to the Neoproterozoic and contains dolomite rich in barite, basal tillite, marine chert and sandstones.

=== Paleozoic (539-251 million years ago) ===
The deposition of Supergroup 2 continued with the formation of sandstones containing brachiopod fossils, in the Cambrian and Ordovician, followed by Late Ordovician tillites, graptolite Silurian sandstones and shales, as well as Devonian shales with reef limestones.

The Mauritanide Belt formed in an orogeny between 320 and 270 million years ago that is allochthonous, lying on top of the Reguibat Shield crystalline basement rocks and the sedimentary rocks of the Taoudeni Basin. The Mauritanide Belt was thrust on top of the Taoudeni Basin during the Hercynian orogeny, which also folded and fractured the edge of the basin. It is one of several West African fold belts along with the Bassarides and Rokelides.

=== Mesozoic-Cenozoic (251 million years ago-present) ===
Mauritania is part of the Senegal Basin and its Mesozoic sedimentary sequence begins with Late Jurassic dolomite formed in a shallow marine environment. Offshore research has found Early Cretaceous detrital sediments lying atop Early Jurassic evaporites. The ocean receded in the region in the Maastrichtian near the end of the Cretaceous, followed by a large marine transgression in the early Cenozoic. The country's sedimentary rocks interfinger between continental sediments and silicate marine sediments in the west.

== Hydrogeology ==
Mauritania has two interconnected groundwater systems, the Continental Terminal coastal system and the interior Taoudeni Basin. Most groundwater flow happens in porous sedimentary rock, although some moves through fractured crystalline basement rock. The Continental Terminal system have very limited recharge, while the Taoudeni Basin has three main areas of recharge on the northwest edge of the shield, in tillites in the south and in the vicinity of Tidjikdja.

Fresh groundwater discharges east into Mali and saltwater intrusions affect the coastal areas of Mauritania.

== Natural resource geology ==
Iron ore mining plays an important role in the economy of Mauritania. Banded iron formations with 64% iron hematite lenses were discovered at F'Derik-Segazou, Tazadit hills and Rouessa, close to the border with Western Sahara in the 1970s. Mining began 25 kilometers north of Zouerate, as part of the Guelb project in the mid-1980s. The site has itabirite with 37% iron. Dust storms and problems at the site's mill have limited production. A different Guelb project site 12 kilometers east of El Rhein became active in the early 1990s, extracting 64% iron ore. A Neoproterozoic carbonate unit, part of a synformal nappe overturned in the Paleozoic, now forms a major copper deposit 250 kilometers northeast of Nouakchott in the Mauritanides Belt. The one kilometer, 250 meter wide deposit spans the West and East Moghrein Guelb hills.

Forty meters below the deposit is a secondary deposit of cuprite, azurite, malachite and tenorite, with an additional 2.25% copper, some gold and sulfide mineralization including cubanite, chalcopyrite, pyrrhotite and arsenopyrite. In the 2000s, mining at the site had mostly ceased except for gold mining in the tailings pile. Gypsum is extracted from the N'Drahamcha quarry, 50 kilometers northeast of Nouakchott, used to produce concrete blocks and plaster. Bofal and Loubboira in southern Mauritania have up 150 megatons of phosphate, at 20% concentration.
