= List of fossiliferous stratigraphic units in Lithuania =

Group or Formation	Period	Notes
Birstonas Formation	Silurian	
Birstonas and Paprieniai Formation	Silurian	
Brasta Formation	Cretaceous	
Dubysa Formation	Silurian	
Geluva Formation	Silurian	
Jiesia Formation	Cretaceous	
Jura Formation	Silurian	
Labguva Formation	Cretaceous	
Lapes Formation	Silurian	
Minija Formation	Silurian	
Mituva Formation	Silurian	
Naujoji Akmene Formation	Permian	
Naujoji Akmené Formation	Permian	
Naujoji Akmené Suite Formation	Permian	
Nevezis Formation	Silurian	
Pagegiai Formation	Silurian	
Papile suite Formation	Jurassic	
Paprienai Formation	Silurian	
Paprieniai Formation	Silurian	
Pregolskian Formation	Permian	
Riga Formation	Silurian	
Riga and Geluva Formation	Silurian	
Sasnava Formation	Permian	
Siesartis Formation	Silurian	
Zalgiris Formation	Permian	

== See also ==
- Lists of fossiliferous stratigraphic units in Europe
