= Drina Formation =

- Stratigraphic range: Cambrian to Carboniferous
- Type: Geological formation
- Underlies: Golija Formation
- Overlies: Basement
- Thickness: 1600 m

The Drina Formation ("Drina Formacija") is a stratigraphic unit in Bosnia and Herzegovina and Serbia. It was deposited between the Cambrian and the Carboniferous onto Neoproterozoic basement. It is composed of clastic sediments, limestone and volcanic rocks. The Drina Formation is conformably overlain by the Golja Formation.

The formation is part of the Drina Ivanjica Unit and was overprinted by the Variscan and Alpine Orogeny.

The oldest fossils are acritarch phytoplancton and spores, which indicate a Cambrian to Ordovician age. The youngest fossils are conodonts which indicate Viséan to Namurian age.
