= List of fossiliferous stratigraphic units in Palau =

This article contains a list of fossil-bearing stratigraphic units in Palau.

== Sites ==
Group or Formation	Period	Notes
Palau Limestone	Neogene	

== See also ==
- Lists of fossiliferous stratigraphic units in Oceania
