= Geology of Somaliland =

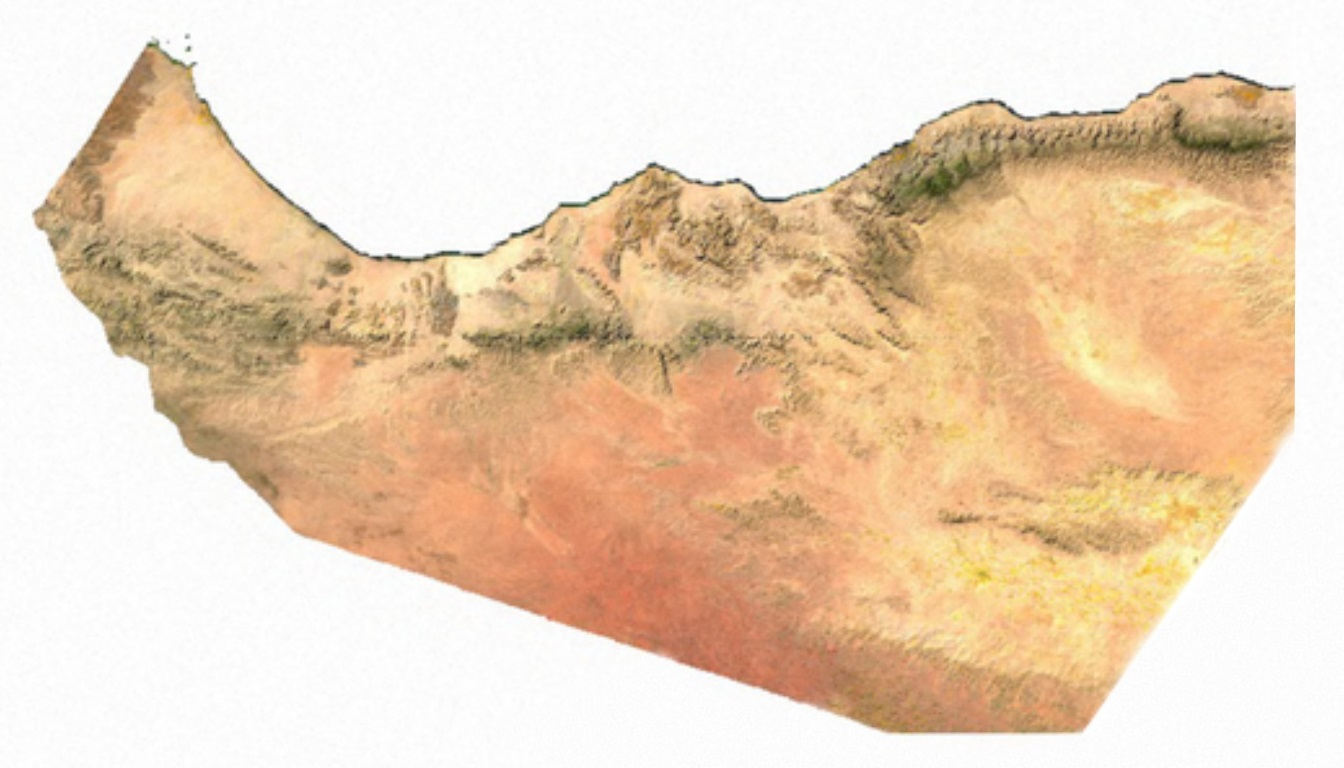

The geology of Somaliland is very closely related to the geology of the rest of Somalia. Because it encompasses the former territory of British Somaliland, the territory is historically better researched than former Italian Somaliland. Somaliland is built on more than 700-million-year-old igneous and metamorphic crystalline basement rock. These ancient units are covered in thick layers of sedimentary rock formed in the last 200 million years and influenced by the drifting apart of the Somali Plate and the Arabian Plate.

== Stratigraphy and geologic history ==
The oldest rock units in Somaliland date back over 700 million years to the Proterozoic, forming crystalline basement rock. Many rock units date to the Mesozoic and the current Cenozoic eons.

=== Proterozoic ===
Somaliland preserves good examples of Proterozoic rocks. As basement rocks, they form a composite terrane, with younger rocks in the east and older rocks in the west. The older rocks pre-date the Pan-African orogeny and were affected by both igneous and metamorphic activity 840, 800 to 760 and 720 million years ago.

The early geology of Somaliland is divided into four major events. The Qabri Bahar complex formed in the Paleoproterozoic through the Mesoproterozoic with mafic and granitoid rocks, as well as rocks metamorphosed up to granulite grade in the sequence of metamorphic facies. Some geologists propose that the Qabri Bahar complex may preserve rocks from before the Pan-African orogeny. Major Event II, more than 700 million years ago, marked deformation, partial melting (also known as anataxis) and rocks metamorphosed up to amphibolite grade.

Major Event III happened 700 to 640 million years ago, bringing crustal thinning and extension, mafic volcanism in the Abdulkadir complex and Mait complex, regional heating, metamorphism and the emplacement of gabbro and syenite through the thinned crust. Major Event IV continued for 100 million years, from 600 to 500 million years ago, spanning into the Paleozoic Era of the Phanerozoic Eon. Granites were emplaced and the deposition of the low-grade, metasedimentary Inda Ad sequence occurred, followed by more deformation and regional heating.

The sequence of events in Somaliland in the Proterozoic correlates with the Arabian-Nubian Shield to the north, which experienced igneous activity related to subduction and witnessed the formation of marginal basins and island arcs.

=== Mesozoic (251-66 million years ago) ===
In the Early Jurassic, the supercontinent Gondwana, which included Africa, began to break apart. The marine transgression of the Tethys Ocean flooded large parts of East Africa and Arabia and new sedimentary rock units were deposited. In the west of Somaliland, the Cretaceous at the end of the Mesozoic brought crustal upwarping, which is preserved in the Yesomma Sandstone.

Basins formed due to the movements of India, Madagascar and East Africa and the opening of the Indian Ocean. The Late Jurassic through the Cretaceous left marl and ammonite fossils, from an open sea environment, followed by shales and belemnite fossils from an epicontinental sea.

=== Cenozoic (66 million years ago-present) ===
Sedimentation continued in the Cenozoic. Deposition of the Yesomma Sandstone continued until another regional marine transgression in the Middle Eocene. The opening of the Gulf of Aden created brackish basins, which filled with marine deposits in the Miocene and Oligocene. Outcrops of these rock units are limited to a few coastal areas in Somaliland, but rapid faulting created offshore basins with up to two kilometers of sediments from the late Cenozoic. In fact, Cenozoic sediments cover much of Somaliland.

The formation of the Somali Plate began 60 million years ago and accelerated at the end of the Oligocene, approximately 23 million years ago. As the Arabian Plate and Somali Plate rifted apart, forming the Gulf of Aden through sea floor spreading in the Late Miocene magma intruded between the two plates.

Of particular significance for Somaliland, rifting in the Oligocene and Miocene reactivated Mesozoic normal faults, forming the Guban Basin. The basin is situated within a topographic high, known as the Somaliland escarpment and is filled with up to three kilometers of Late Cretaceous and Cenozoic sedimentary rocks. In places within the basin, the Late Cretaceous Jesomma sandstone is overlain by the eroded remnants of the Eocene Taleh Anhydrite. The basin contains shale, limestone, mudstone, sandstone and evaporite.

== Hydrogeology ==
Dozens of springs have been identified and exploited in Somaliland, where they are more common in karst aquifers. Most people in Somaliland get their drinking water from aquifers, although poor quality water often means that boreholes go abandoned.

The Eocene Karkar Limestone, Auradu Limestone and Taalex Limestone are important karstic aquifers in Somaliland and Puntland, along with thick, unconsolidated sediment aquifers up to 100 meters thick formed in the past 2.5 million years of the Quaternary in wadi locations throughout the county. Fractured Pleistocene basalt flows, particularly near Las Dhure and Agabar have potential as aquifers. The Yesomma Sandstone is a high productivity aquifer.

Fourteen water utilities serve towns in Somaliland and neighboring Puntland, although at least 750,000 people on the outskirts of Hargeisa lack piped water.

== Natural resource geology ==
Mining is not a significant part of the economy of Somaliland. During British administration of Somaliland, geologists Thompson and Bell launched initial hydrocarbon research in 1918. The Anglo-Persian Oil Company initiated a large scale mapping project of the Guban Basin in 1920.

Comprehensive geologic reports were made available in 1954 by the Geological Survey of British Somaliland and Somaliland Oil Exploration Company. Relatively few studies have been published since Somali independence in 1960. As of 2015, 11 wells had been drilled offshore and two onshore. Studies resumed in the 1980s and 1990s and in some cases, small oil plays were found in the Jesummah sandstone. Hydrocarbon research on the basin remains ongoing.
