= List of fossiliferous stratigraphic units in Bosnia and Herzegovina =

This is a list of fossiliferous stratigraphic units in Bosnia and Herzegovina.

| Group or Formation | Period | Notes |
|---|---|---|
| Drina Formation | Paleozoic | |
| Werfen Formation | Triassic | |

== See also ==
- Lists of fossiliferous stratigraphic units in Europe
