= List of fossiliferous stratigraphic units in Greece =

Group or Formation	Period	Notes
Achladia Formation	Neogene	
Akros Formation	Paleogene	
Akrotiri Formation	Neogene	
Ambelouzos Formation	Neogene	
Ampelouzos Formation	Neogene	
Antonios Formation	Neogene	
Apolakkia Formation	Greece	
Apostoli Formation	Neogene	
Arachneon Formation	Paleogene	
Barmari Group/Episkopi Formation	Permian	
Cape Papas Formation	Cretaceous	
Cape Rigas Formation	Permian	
Domvrena Marble Formation	Jurassic	
Dytiko Formation	Neogene	
Episkopi Formation	Permian	
Eptachorion Formation	Paleogene	
Eros Limestone Formation	Triassic	
Evangelistria Formation	Cretaceous	
Finikia Formation	Neogene	
Fodele Formation	Permian	
Gavdos Formation	Neogene	
Gavrovo Formation	Paleogene	
Gymnocodiacean Limestone Formation	Permian	
Gymnocodiacean Limestone Formation	Permian	
Gymnocodiacean Limestones Formation	Permian	
Gymnocodiacean limestones Formation	Permian	
Gymnocodiacean Limestones Formation	Permian	
Kiona Formation	Cretaceous	
Klokova Formation	Paleogene	
Kolympia Formation	Neogene	
Koukounaras Formation	Neogene	
Kourtes Formation	Neogene	
Lapithas Formation	Paleogene	
Lefkon Formation	Neogene	
Lehusis Formation	Permian	
Lindos Acropolis Formation	Gialos Algal Biolithite, Kleopulu Calcirudite	
MakriFormation	Neogene	
Marmari Formation	Permian	
Marmarotrapeza Formation	Triassic	
Miamou Formation	Jurassic	
Miras Formation	Permian	
Nea Nikopolis Formation	Cretaceous	
Nikiti Formation	Neogene	
Othris Group/Anavra Chert Formation	Jurassic	
Othrsi Group/Anavra Chert Formation	Jurassic	
Pantokrator Formation	Triassic	
Pantokrator limestone Formation	Triassic	
Pantokrator limestone Formation	Triassic	
Platanochori Formation	Greece	
Potami Formation	Jurassic, Triassic	
Premygdonian Group/Gerakarou Formation	Neogene	
Rhodes Formation	Neogene	
Roka Formation	Neogene	
Skiathos Formation	Permian	
Skolis Formation	Cretaceous	
Spilia Formation	Neogene	
Talea Ori Formation	Triassic	
Trachones Formation	Neogene	
Tsotilion Formation	Neogene	
Varvara Formation	Neogene	
Vigla Formation	Cretaceous	
Vrachionas Formation	Paleogene	
Vrysses Formation	Neogene	
Vrysses Group/Aghia Varvara Formation	Neogene	
Xiron Formation	Jurassic	

== See also ==
- Lists of fossiliferous stratigraphic units in Europe
