= List of fossiliferous stratigraphic units in Turkey =

Group or Formation	Period	Notes
Acigöl Group/Tokca Formation	Paleogene	
Afyon Formation	Neogene	
Akcay Group/Mortuma Formation	Paleogene	
Akcay Group/Sagdere Formation	Paleogene	
Akdag Formation	Triassic	
Akgöl Group/Karadagtepe Formation	Triassic	
Akkuyu Formation	Jurassic	
Aksucay Formation	Neogene	
Alacaagzi Formation	Carboniferous	
Bahcecik Formation	Triassic	
Ballik Formation	Cretaceous, Jurassic, Triassic	
Barak Radiolarite Formation	Cretaceous	
Bayraktepe Formation	Neogene	
Bedinan Formation	Ordovician	
Bey Daglari Formation	Cretaceous	
Beykoz Formation	Permian, Carboniferous	
Cal Tepe Formation	Cambrian	
Cambazkaya Formation	Permian	
Cengellidere Formation	Cretaceous	
Cenger Formation	Triassic	
Cerkesli Formation	Cretaceous	
Cevlim Formation	Cretaceous	
Davutlar Formation	Cretaceous	
Demirkazik Formation	Carboniferous	
Dereköy Unit Formation	Triassic	
Dolayba Limestone Formation	Silurian	
Dursunlu Formation	Turkey	
Ergene Formation	Neogene	
Esiri Formation	Triassic	
Gavuralani Formation	Carboniferous	
Gedeller Formation	Cretaceous	
Gerence Formation	Triassic	
Geyik Dagi Unit Group/Polat Formation	Cretaceous, Jurassic	
Gokdere Formation	Triassic	
Gomaniibrik Formation	Permian	
Gökdere Formation	Triassic	
Güvercinlik Formation	Triassic	
Hayrettin Formation	Paleogene	
Hocakoey Formation	Jurassic	
Ispartacay Formation	Jurassic	
Kabalar Group/Aktas Formation	Jurassic	
Kapiz Formation	Cretaceous	
Karadere Formation	Triassic	
Kartal Formation	Paleogene	
Kasaba Formation	Neogene	
Kasimlar Formation	Triassic	
Kayabuku Formation	Jurassic, Triassic	
Killik Formation	Triassic	
Kirkkavak Formation	Paleogene	
Kizilirmak Formation	Neogene	
Kokarkuyu Formation	Triassic	
Köprücay Formation	Neogene	
Lokman Formation	Cretaceous	
Mamara Formation	Turkey	
Mendikdere Formation	Paleogene	
Nodular Limestone Formation	Triassic	
Oymapimar Limestone Formation	Neogene	
p Formation	Triassic	
Pamucak Formation	Triassic, Permian	
Pendik Group/Icerenkoy Formation	Devonian	
Pendik Group/Kartal Formation	Devonian	
Pendik Group/Kozyatagi Formation	Devonian	
Polat Formation	Cretaceous	
Randkalk Formation	Carboniferous	
Sagdere Formation	Paleogene	
Sapadere Formation	Triassic	
Sirçalik Formation	Triassic	
Sosink Formation	Cambrian	
Sultan Dagi Group/Polat Formation	Cretaceous	
Sögütlü dere Formation	Jurassic	
Tarasci Formation	Triassic	
Terbüzek Formation	Cretaceous	
Teshbihli Formation	Triassic	
Tokça Formation	Paleogene	
Turgut Formation	Neogene	
Ulukışla Formation	Paleogene, Cretaceous	
Uzuncarsidere Formation	Paleogene	
Uçarsu Formation	Neogene	
Yalaz Formation	Cretaceous	
Yatagan Formation	Neogene	
Yenicebogazidere Formation	Cretaceous, Jurassic	
Yoncali Formation	Paleogene	
Yukariköy Formation	Jurassic	
Zindan Radiolarite Formation	Jurassic	
Zindancik Formation	Carboniferous	
Çakrazboz Formation	Triassic	
Çardak Formation	Paleogene	
Çatalçeşme Formation	Carboniferous	

== See also ==
- Lists of fossiliferous stratigraphic units in Europe
- Lists of fossiliferous stratigraphic units in Asia
