= Geology of Togo =

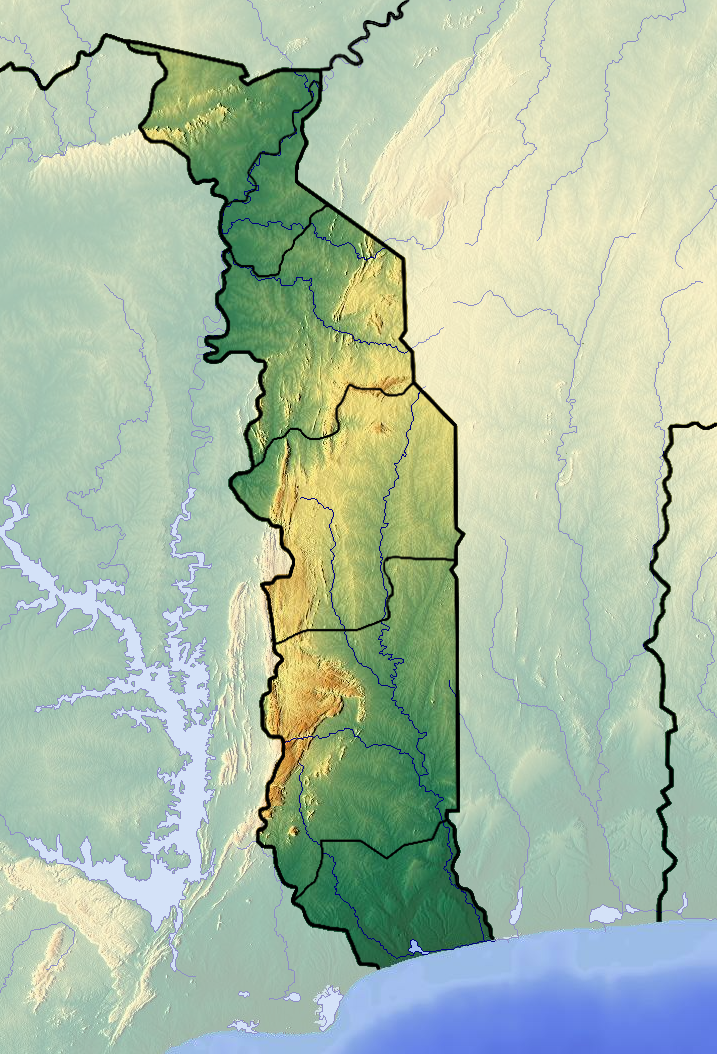
Topography of Togo

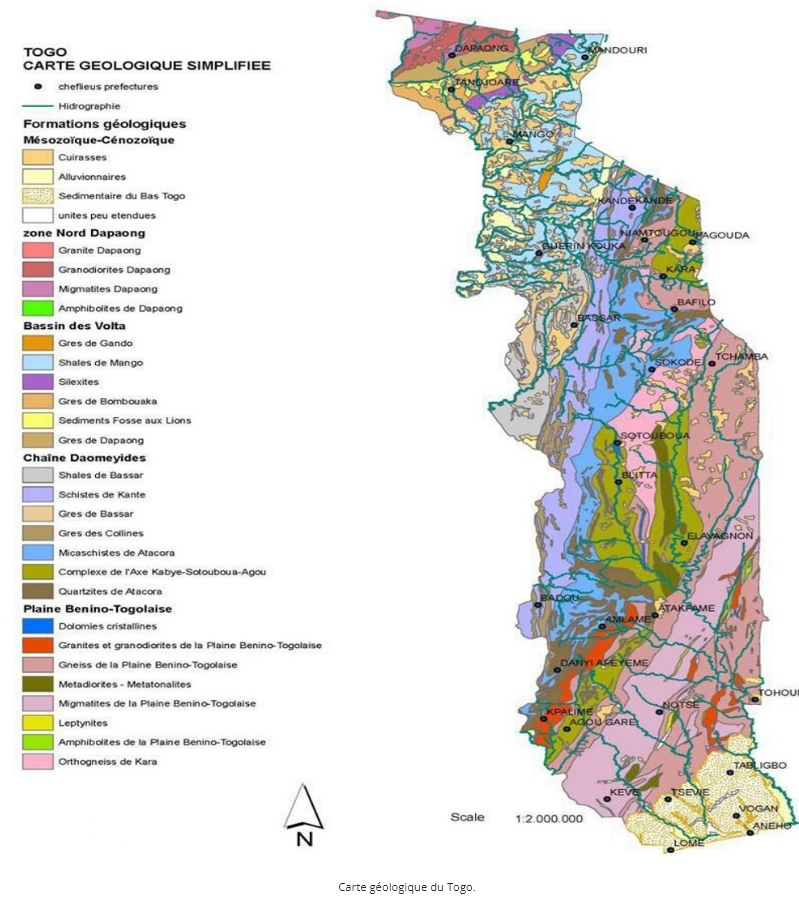
Geological map of Togo

The geology of Togo is largely of gneisses and granitic rocks of Proterozoic age in the central and southern part of the country. These are overlain in the coastal zone by Cretaceous and Cenozoic sediments. The northern part of Togo has a basement of Neoproterozoic metamorphic rocks and Paleoproterozoic granite. The south of the country is covered in sedimentary basins, covering 3,300 km^{2} of land. The West African Craton is made up of crystalline structures, ranging in age from the Neoarchean to the Paleoproterozoic age. The North-Dapaong zone, which is located in the West African Craton, migmatites, gneisses, amphibolites, granodiorites and granites are commonly found. The Neoproterozoic Volta Basin contains sedimentary formations on the Birimian bedrocks. These sedimentary formations are divided into two groups: an intra-tillite group and a supra-tillite group.

== Economic geology ==
Togo mines gold, diamonds, and phosphate rock, with the largest of these being phosphate rock. The phosphate rock is found Eocene deposits at the coastal basin. In addition to those easy to exploit locations, there are also hardened Neoproterozoic which have not been exploited. The country is Africa's sixth highest producer of phosphate rock. Diamonds and gold are extracted on the artisanal level, and is Africa's sixth largest gold producer. The diamonds are found in alluvial formations in rivers. Exploration activities unveiled the possibility of mining in the future: bauxite, gypsum, iron ore, manganese, marble, rutile, zinc, uranium, and lithic metals. Togo does not have a petroleum sector.

== Gallery ==
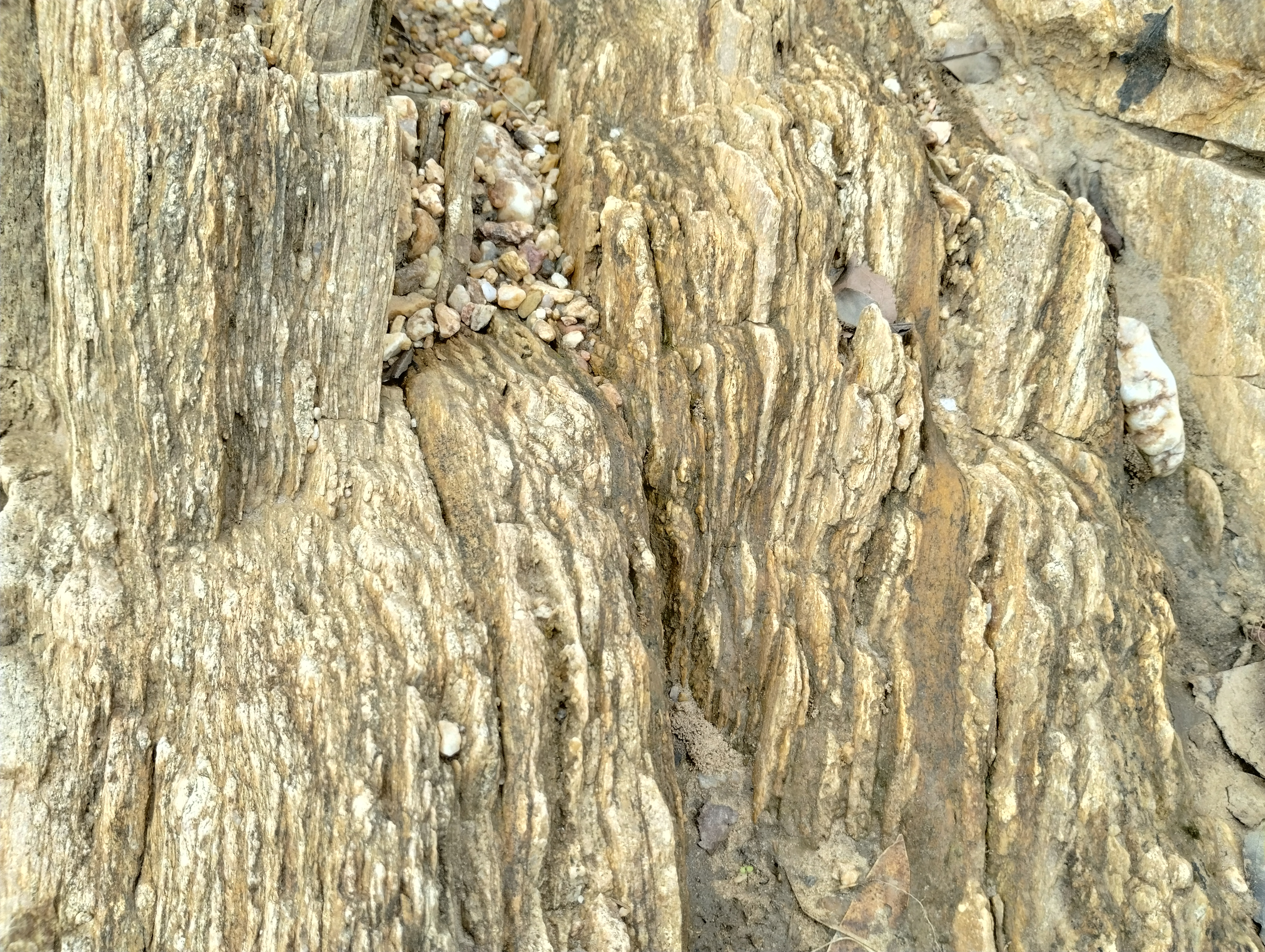
Weathered metamorphic rock at Malfa-Kassa in central Togo
