= List of fossiliferous stratigraphic units in the Isle of Man =

Group or Formation	Period	Notes
Great Scar Limestone Group	Carboniferous	
