= Geology of Senegal =

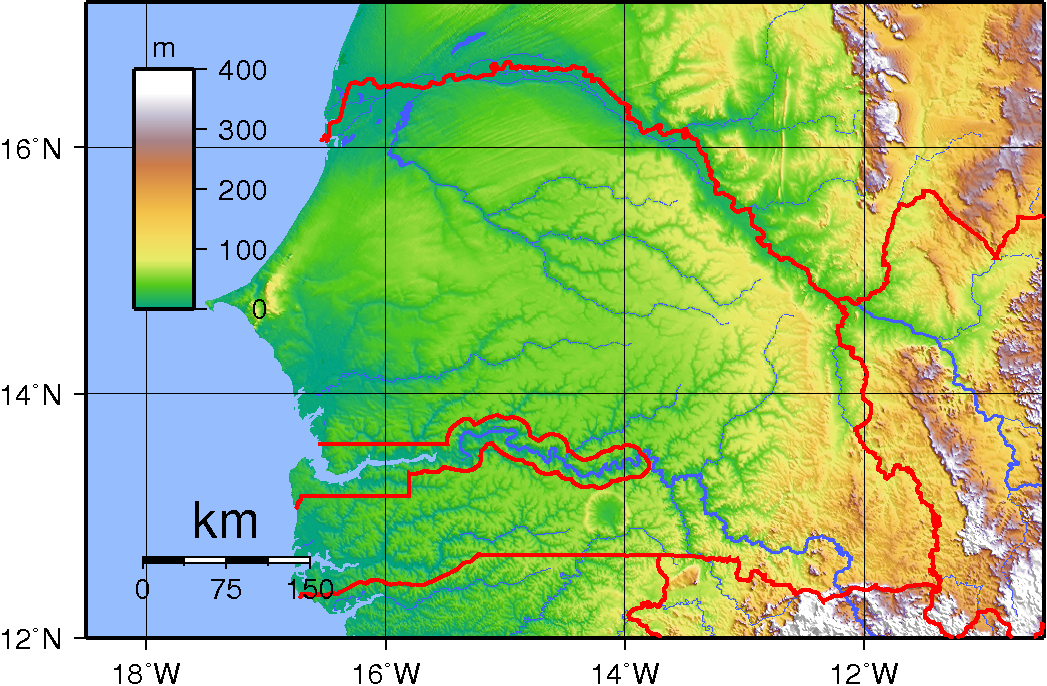
Topography of Senegal

The geology of Senegal formed beginning more than two billion years ago. The Archean greenschist Birimian rocks common throughout West Africa are the oldest in the country, intruded by Proterozoic granites. Basins formed in the interior during the Paleozoic and filled with sedimentary rocks, including tillite from a glaciation. With the rifting apart of the supercontinent Pangaea in the Mesozoic, the large Senegal Basin filled with thick sequences of marine and terrestrial sediments. Sea levels declined in the Eocene forming large phosphate deposits. Senegal is blanketed in thick layers of terrestrial sediments formed in the Quaternary. The country has extensive natural resources, including gold, diamonds, and iron.

== Stratigraphy, tectonics and geologic history ==
The oldest rocks in Senegal are Archean or Proterozoic Birimian, commonly found throughout much of West Africa. Birimian rock units include the metabasic, meta-andesite, breccia and greywacke of the Mako Series, Diale Series meta-basites, red jasper, conglomerate, schist and marble, as well as the schist, greywacke and conglomerates of the Dalema Series. In the Kedougou inlier, these volcanic and sedimentary rocks were intruded by granite plutons in the Paleoproterozoic, during the Eburnean orogeny between 2 billion and 1.8 billion years ago. In southeastern Senegal, the Neoproterozoic Madina-Kouta Basin outcrops along the edge of the inlier.

=== Paleozoic (539-251 million years ago) ===
The Komba Basin, bounded by the Kedougou inlier, Madina-Kouta Basin and eastern edge of the Bassaris branch contains the horizontal sedimentary rocks of the Early Cambrian Mali Group. The basin has a northern extension, known as the Faleme Basin is filled with chert, limestone and tillite potentially related to the glaciations of the Paleozoic.

=== Mesozoic –Cenozoic (251 million years ago-present) ===
The Senegal sedimentary basin, also known as the Senegal-Mauritania Basin, formed as the largest marginal basin in Africa during the rifting apart of the center of the supercontinent Pangaea to form the Atlantic Ocean in the Mesozoic. The basin is 1400 kilometers from north to south and 500 kilometers at its maximum width at Dakar. This Atlantic-type half-basin has gently dipping sedimentary units that get thicker closer to the coast. Due to overlying sediments from the Oligocene to modern times, its exact structure and origins are unclear.

Pre-Mesozoic basement rock slopes gently westward onshore and then drops offshore along a north–south fault. The depth to basement rock is six kilometers off of Dakar and eight kilometers off of Casamance. Two major north–south faults, formed in the Cretaceous through the late Miocene, break up the basin into horsts and grabens. The southern part of the basin has 10 salt domes (also known as diapirs). There are several disconformities, one offshore from the Senonian and the from the Oligocene, spanning the entire basin. The sedimentary sequence begins with Triassic evaporite, gypsum, halite and anhydrite, which coincided with a tholeiitic magma series.

Two kilometers of carbonates formed in the Jurassic, with large amounts of detrital elements during the Aptian and clastic sedimentation between the Aptian and the Lutetian. The Albian through the Turonian are represented by argillite and organic-rich sediments, followed by biochemical precipitation since the Paleocene epoch of the Cenozoic. During the Maastrichtian, an alkali syenite dome near Saint Louis intruded sand deposits.

By the early Cenozoic, the ocean retreated, except in the Casamance Gulf and by the Eocene, the region was experiencing intense, terrestrial weathering. The Cap-Vert experienced two peaks of volcanism, one in the Miocene and the other in the Quaternary, producing small occurrences of undersaturated, alkaline lavas. During the Quaternary, volcanism at the head of the Cap-Vert peninsula built the Mamelles volcano and its associated vents and flows.

== Hydrogeology ==
The Senegal Superficial aquifer system is formed of unconsolidated Quaternary sediments, covering the entirety of the Senegal Basin. In some cases, groundwater is hosted beneath basalts, and water depths range considerably between a few meters and up to 72 meters below the surface. The Intermediate aquifer is consolidated limestone karst, beneath the Superficial aquifer. It experiences salt water intrusion near the coast and high iron and fluoride in the center of the country. The deep aquifer system is composed of Maastrichtian calcareous sandstone. This 250 meter thick aquifer is the main water supply for much of Senegal, and experiences comparable salinity and iron contamination issues.

== Natural resource geology ==
Senegal has extensive natural resources and there is high potential for gold in Paleoproterozoic rocks. Artisanal mines extract gold from the Birimian greenschist belts in the southeast. The carbonate-hosted Faleme iron deposit contains 800 million tons of ore, in one of the largest Paleoproterozoic deposits in Africa. Magnetite and iron hydroxide in the formation is up to 60 percent pure iron. Diamonds are found in the Faleme River and the Gambia River and prospecting for titanium-bearing sands began in the 1980s. In addition to metals, Senegal has large phosphate reserves, formed in Cenozoic, particularly the Eocene. The switch from a marine to a continental environment in the Eocene led to the long-running enrichment of lime phosphates to aluminum phosphates.

== See also ==
- Bambouk
- Kenieba
- Kenieba inlier
- Birimian
