= Logbadjeck Formation =

- Stratigraphic range: Late Turonian-early Campanian; ~90–80 Ma
- Type: Geological formation
- Underlies: Logbaba Formation
- Overlies: Mundeck Formation

Lithology
- Primary: Shale, limestone, marl
- Other: Siltstone, sandstone

Location
- Coordinates: 3.9°N 10.0°E
- Approximate paleocoordinates: 8.8°S 41.4°W
- Region: Southwest Region
- Country: Cameroon
- Extent: Douala Basin
- Logbadjeck Formation (Cameroon)

The Logbadjeck Formation, also known as the Mungo River Formation, is a Late Cretaceous geologic formation in Cameroon. It is Turonian to Campanian in age, and represents a marine depositional environment. Pterosaur fossils have been recovered from the formation.

== See also ==
- List of pterosaur-bearing stratigraphic units
