= List of fossiliferous stratigraphic units in Kenya =

Group or Formation	Period	Notes
Bakate Formation	Neogene	
Chamtwara Formation	Neogene	
Changamwe Shale	Jurassic	
Chemeron Formation	Neogene	
Lapurr Sandstone	Cretaceous	

== See also ==
- Lists of fossiliferous stratigraphic units in Africa
