= List of fossiliferous stratigraphic units in Gibraltar =

Group or Formation	Period	Notes
Gibraltar Limestone	Early Jurassic	
