= List of fossiliferous stratigraphic units in Western Sahara =

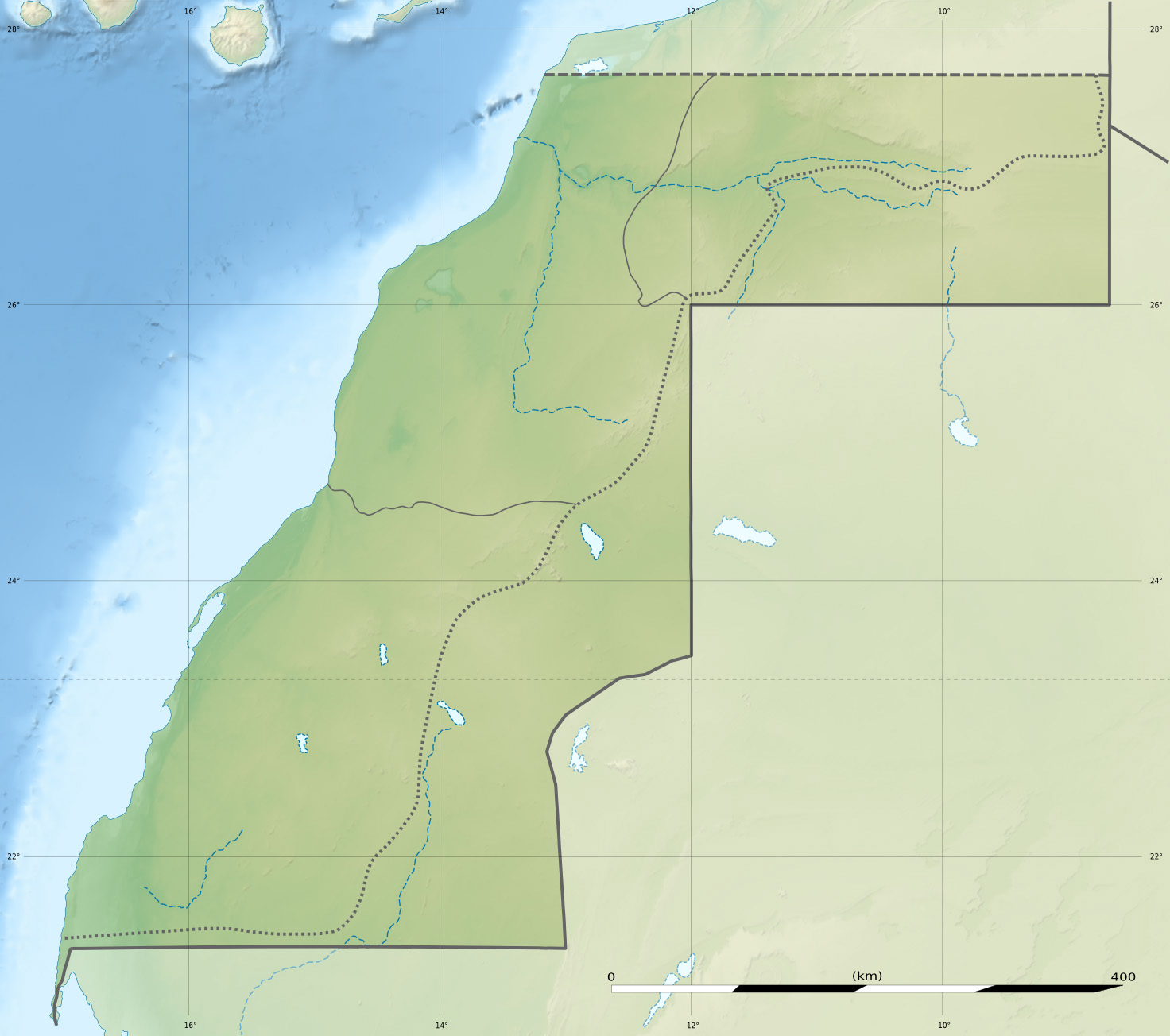
Fossiliferous stratigraphic units in Western Sahara
Samlat Formation
Aridal Formation
Frasnian Formation
Spanish Sahara Formation

This is a list of fossiliferous stratigraphic units in Western Sahara.

Formation	Period	Notes
Samlat Formation	Priabonian	
Aridal Formation	Bartonian	
Frasnian Formation	Frasnian	
Spanish Sahara Formation	Middle Devonian	

== See also ==
- Lists of fossiliferous stratigraphic units in Africa
  - List of fossiliferous stratigraphic units in Mauritania
