= List of fossiliferous stratigraphic units in Albania =

Fossiliferous stratigraphic units in Albania
Vigla Formation
Kalur Chert
Han-Bulog Formation

This is a list of fossiliferous stratigraphic units in Albania.

== List of fossiliferous stratigraphic units ==
Formation	Period	Notes
Vigla Formation	Late Barremian-Middle Albian	
Kalur Chert	Late Bajocian-Middle Oxfordian	
Han-Bulog Formation	Olenekian-Anisian	

== See also ==
- Lists of fossiliferous stratigraphic units in Europe
- Geology of Albania
