= List of fossiliferous stratigraphic units in Latvia =

Group or Formation	Period	Notes
Amata Formation	Devonian	
Lode Formation	Devonian	
Naujoji Akmené Formation	Permian	
Ventspils Formation	Silurian	

== See also ==
- Lists of fossiliferous stratigraphic units in Europe
