= List of fossiliferous stratigraphic units in Rhode Island =

This article contains a list of fossil-bearing stratigraphic units in the state of Rhode Island, U.S.

== Sites ==
Group or Formation	Period	Notes
Allegheny Formation	Carboniferous	

== See also ==
- Paleontology in Rhode Island
