= List of fossiliferous stratigraphic units in Cape Verde =

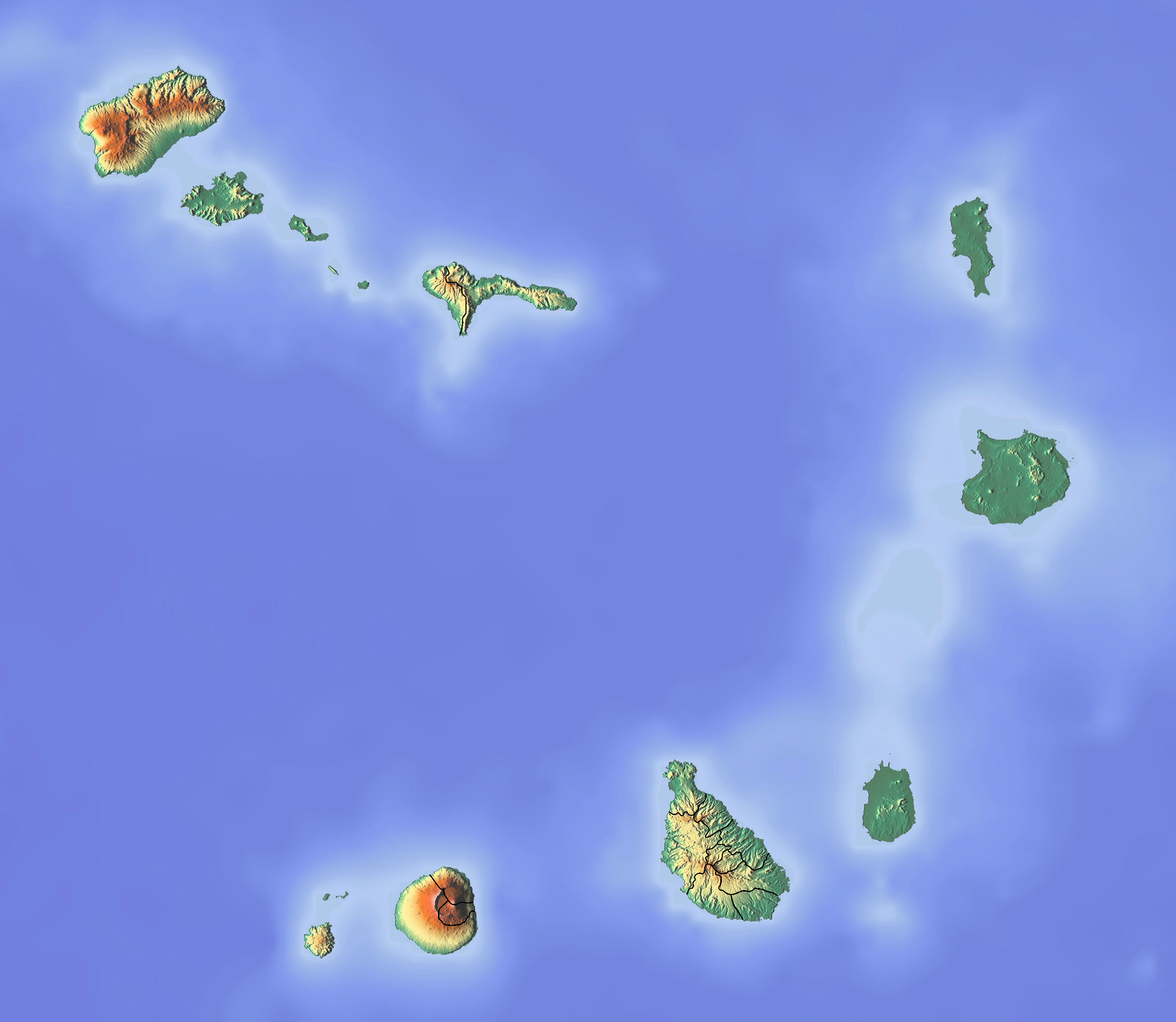
Fossiliferous stratigraphic units in Cape Verde
Assomada Formation

This is a list of fossiliferous stratigraphic units in Cape Verde.

Group	Formation	Period	Notes
	Assomada Formation	Calabrian	

== See also ==
- Lists of fossiliferous stratigraphic units in Africa
- Geology of Cape Verde
