= List of fossiliferous stratigraphic units in Georgia (country) =

| Group or Formation | Period | Notes |
|---|---|---|
| Bathonian coal Formation | Jurassic | |
| Coal and shale Suite Formation | Jurassic | |
| Coal Suite Formation | Jurassic | |
| Kisatibi Formation | Neogene | |
| Kistinka Suite Formation | Jurassic | |
| Shale Suite Formation | Jurassic | |
| Suite of conglomerate and QFormation | Triassic | |

== See also ==
- Lists of fossiliferous stratigraphic units in Europe
