= List of fossiliferous stratigraphic units in Ukraine =

List of Ukrainian geological records

Group or Formation	Period	Notes
Akavassky Formation	Carboniferous	
Argun Formation	Neogene	
Avilov Formation	Carboniferous	
Bagovitsa Formation	Silurian	
Balta Sands Formation	Neogene	
Bashkev Formation	Neogene	
Bogdanovka Beds	Devonian	
Buchak Formation	Paleogene	
Chersonian Formation	Neogene	
Chortkov Formation	Devonian	
Chortkov Beds	Devonian	
Chortkov Suite	Devonian	
Demshin Subsuite Formation	Silurian	
Dniester Formation	Devonian	
Dokuchaevsk Formation	Carboniferous	
Driester Group/Babin Sandstone	Devonian	
Dzvenygorod Suite	Silurian	
Dzwinogorod Beds	Silurian	
Fourmanivka Suite	Silurian	
Garazhovka Formation	Triassic	
Goloskov Subsuite	Silurian	
Grinchuk Beds	Silurian	
Grinchuk Subsuite	Silurian	
Isakov Beds	Silurian	
Isakovtsy Beds	Silurian	
Isayevian Suite	Carboniferous	
Ivane Beds	Devonian	
Ivane Suite	Devonian	
Jajla Formation	Jurassic	
Kamenka Formation	Carboniferous	
Kamenka Suite	Jurassic	
Khudykovtsy Suite	Devonian	
Kyiv Formation	Paleogene	
Kievskaya Formation	Paleogene	
Kitaigorod Formation	Silurian	
Kitaygorod Formation	Silurian	
Konglomeratbank Formation	Cretaceous	
Konovka Beds	Silurian	
Konovka Suite	Silurian	
Kual'nikian Formation	Neogene	
Kuchurgan Sands Formation	Neogene	
Kuyal'nikian Formation	Neogene	
Lower Kamenka Suite	Jurassic	
Luza Formation	Paleogene	
Malinovtsy Formation	Silurian	
Mandrikovka Formation	Paleogene	
Marta Formation	Permian	
Mitkov Beds	Devonian	
Mitkov Suite	Devonian	
Muksha Subsuite	Silurian	
Nesterov Suite	Jurassic	
Nikitovskoy Formation	Permian	
Novorayskaya Suite	Triassic	
Odesa Limestone	Neogene	
Orel' Suite	Jurassic	
Protopivka Formation	Triassic	
Rashkov Formation	Silurian	
Rashkov Beds	Silurian	
Restevo Subsuite	Silurian	
Rykhta Formation	Silurian	
Rykhta Suite	Silurian	
Skal'skii Horizon Group/Rashkovskie Beds	Silurian	
Skelevatka Formation	Carboniferous	
Slavyanskoy Formation	Permian	
Slavyanskoy Group/Bryanchevskaya Formation	Permian	
Sokil Formation	Silurian	
Sokol Beds	Silurian	
Sokol Subsuite	Silurian	
Styla Formation	Carboniferous	
Tajna Beds	Devonian	
Tajne Suite	Silurian	
Tavda Formation	Paleogene	
Teremtsy Suite	Silurian	
Ternava Suite	Silurian	
Trubchin Suite	Silurian	
Upper Kamala Suite	Jurassic	
Varnitsa Formation	Silurian	
Varnitsa Suite	Silurian	
Volnovakha Formation	Carboniferous	
Vrublevtsy Subsuite	Silurian	
Zvenigorod Suite Formation	Silurian	

== See also ==
- Lists of fossiliferous stratigraphic units in Europe
