= Paleontology in Hawaii =

Paleontological research in the U.S. state of Hawaii

The location of the state of Hawaii

Paleontology in Hawaii refers to paleontological research occurring within or conducted by people from the U.S. state of Hawaii. The Hawaiian islands began to form as a result of volcanic activity about 5 million years ago during the Pliocene. Due to their young age and igneous geology, the islands preserve very few fossils. Most such remains are creatures like relatively recent corals and molluscs that lived in the area when sea levels were higher than they are today. Overall the state has seen very little paleontological research within its borders. According to author Marian Murray, prior to the 1974 publication of the second edition to her book Hunting for Fossils most of the little research on Hawaii's fossils record had already gone out of print. She recommended that would-be amateur fossil hunters in Hawaii consult staff of a local museum for clues on where to hunt due to the rarity of fossils and the lack of easily accessible information on them.

== Prehistory ==
The oldest of the Hawaiian islands is Kauai, of the archipelago's northwest. Kauai preserves lava flows that formed slightly more than five million years ago. No non-avian dinosaur fossils have ever been found in Hawaii because the volcanic activity responsible for their creation did not begin until after their extinction. Hawaii therefore has rocks of both the wrong age and type to preserve dinosaur fossils. Most of Hawaii's animal fossil record consists of marine life. At times during the Quaternary, sea levels were higher than they are today. Organisms that once lived on these higher seafloors are now fossilized and exposed on the islands of Kauai, Oahu, Molokai, Lanai, and Maui. The islands' sparse local fossil record is dominated by corals and mollusks. The Waianae coast of Oahu preserves Pleistocene reef communities including organisms like algae, coral, foraminiferans, and molluscs. Hawaii's terrestrial fossil record includes Quaternary bird remains preserved in sand dunes and sinkholes. Additionally, fragmentary plant remains have been preserved in some of the volcanic deposits of Oahu.

== People ==
Annie Montague Alexander was born in Honolulu on December 29, 1867.

== Natural history museums ==
- Bernice P. Bishop Museum, Honolulu
- Dinosaurs in Hawaii, Honolulu Community College, Honolulu
- Koke'e Natural History Museum, Kauai
