= List of fossiliferous stratigraphic units in Serbia =

Group or Formation	Period	Notes
The Osmakovo fossil site	Cretaceous	The fosilliferous strata in Osmakovo were not named officially yet.

== See also ==
- Lists of fossiliferous stratigraphic units in Europe
