= List of stratigraphic units in Austria =

This is a list of stratigraphic units that are found in Austria.

Name	Image	Start of deposition	End of deposition
Allgäu Formation		Hettangian	Sinemurian
Alpine Colored Sandstone			
Ammergau Formation			
Bellerophon Formation		Lopingian	
Colored Dolomite			
Dachstein Formation			
Garschella Formation			
Gosau Group		Cenomanian	Ypresian
Göstling Formation			
Gröden Formation			
Gutenstein Formation			
Hallstätt Formation			
Lunz Formation			
Main Dolomite			
Oberalm Formation		Tithonian	Berriasian
Raibl Formation			
Ramsau Dolomite		Carnian	
Reichenhall Formation			
Reifling Formation			
Ruhpolding Formation			
Schlern Group			
Schrambach Formation			
Schrattenkalk Formation			
Steinalm Formation			
Tristel Formation		Barremian	Aptian
Werfen Formation			
Wetterstein Formation		Anisian	Carnian
