= List of fossiliferous stratigraphic units in Austria =

Major fossiliferous stratigraphic units in Austria
Paldau Formation
Weissenegg Formation
Pielach Formation
Grünbach Formation
Schrambach Formation
Tauglboden Formation
Allgäu Formation
Partnach Formation
Trogkofel Formation
Corona Formation

This is a list of fossiliferous stratigraphic units in Austria.

== List of fossiliferous stratigraphic units ==
| Formation | Period | Notes |
|---|---|---|
| Baden Formation | Neogene | |
| Baden Tegel Formation | Neogene | |
| Baden Group/Leitha Limestone Formation | Neogene | |
| Baden Group/Weissenegg Formation | Neogene | |
| Baden Group/Leitha Formation | Neogene | |
| Burgschleinitz Formation | Neogene | |
| Eibiswald Formation | Neogene | |
| Feistring Formation | Neogene | |
| Fels Formation | Neogene | |
| Grund Formation | Neogene | |
| Hartl Formation | Neogene | |
| Laa Formation | Neogene | |
| Leitha Limestone | Neogene | |
| Melker Sand | Neogene | |
| Paldau Formation | Neogene | |
| Retz Formation | Neogene | |
| Skalica Formation | Neogene | |
| Tauchen Formation | Neogene | |
| Weissenegg Formation | Neogene | |
| Ebelsberg Formation | Neogene, Paleogene | |
| Älterer Schlier Formation | Paleogene | |
| Bruderndorf Sandstone | Paleogene | |
| Haidhof Formation | Paleogene | |
| Kambuhel Formation | Paleogene | |
| Linz Formation | Paleogene | |
| Linzer Sanden Formation | Paleogene | |
| Lithothamnium Limestone Formation | Paleogene | |
| Melk Formation | Paleogene | |
| Oiching Formation | Paleogene | |
| Pielach Formation | Paleogene | |
| Waschberg Formation | Paleogene | |
| Gams Formation | Cretaceous | |
| Garschella Formation | Cretaceous | |
| Gosau Group/Grabenbach Formation | Cretaceous | |
| Gosau Group/Grünbach Formation | Cretaceous | |
| Gosau Group/Hochmoos Formation | Cretaceous | |
| Kieselkalk Formation | Cretaceous | |
| Rossfeld Formation | Cretaceous | |
| Schrambach Formation | Cretaceous | |
| Schrattenkalk Formation | Cretaceous | |
| Steinmühl Formation | Cretaceous | |
| Theresienstein Formation | Cretaceous | |
| Oberalmer Formation | Cretaceous, Jurassic | |
| Plassen Formation | Cretaceous, Jurassic | |
| Lärchberg Formation | Jurassic | |
| Neuburger Bank Formation | Jurassic | |
| Allgäu Formation | Jurassic | |
| Alpiner Lias Formation | Jurassic | |
| Blassenstein Formation | Jurassic | |
| Dürrnberg Formation | Jurassic | |
| Ernstbrunn Formation | Jurassic | |
| Fonsjoch Formation | Jurassic | |
| Gresten Formation | Jurassic | |
| Hierlatz Limestone | Jurassic | |
| Rotgefleckter Liaskalk | Jurassic | |
| Sachrang Formation | Jurassic | |
| Tauglboden Formation | Jurassic | |
| Weissbach Formation | Jurassic | |
| Adnet Group/Schnöll Formation | Jurassic | |
| Kendlbach Formation | Jurassic, Triassic | |
| Adnet Formation | Jurassic, Triassic | |
| Dachstein Formation | Triassic | |
| Goestling Formation | Triassic | |
| Grossreifling Limestone | Triassic | |
| Hallstatt Formation | Triassic | |
| Halobienschiefer Formation | Triassic | |
| Hauptdolomit | Triassic | |
| Kössen Formation | Triassic | |
| Lechkogel Formation | Triassic | |
| Loibl Formation | Triassic | |
| Lunz Formation | Triassic | |
| Oberrhaet Formation | Triassic | |
| Partnach Formation | Triassic | |
| Pedata Formation | Triassic | |
| Plattenkalk Formation | Triassic | |
| Pötschenkalk | Triassic | |
| Raibl Formation | Triassic | |
| Reingrabener Schiefer | Triassic | |
| Schlern Dolomite Formation | Triassic | |
| Schreyeralm Formation | Triassic | |
| Seefelder Formation | Triassic | |
| Starhemberg Formation | Triassic | |
| Steinalm Formation | Triassic | |
| Tisovec Limestone | Triassic | |
| Werfen Formation | Triassic | |
| Wetterstein Formation | Triassic | |
| Zlambach Formation | Triassic | |
| Alpine Salt Deposits Formation | Permian | |
| Grenzland Formation | Permian | |
| Trogkofel Formation | Permian | |
| Zweikofel Formation | Permian | |
| Zöbing Formation | Permian | |
| Pseudoschwagerina Limestone | Permian, Carboniferous | |
| Auernig Group/Auernig Formation | Carboniferous | |
| Bombaso Formation | Carboniferous | |
| Corona Formation | Carboniferous | |
| Meledis Formation | Carboniferous | |
| Nötsch Formation | Carboniferous | |
| Eisenberg Formation | Devonian | |
| Grau Riffkalk Formation | Devonian | |
| Hohe Warte Limestone | Devonian | |
| Kellergrat Reef Limestone | Devonian | |
| Kollerkogel Formation | Devonian | |
| Plabutsch Formation | Devonian | |
| Rauchkofel Formation | Devonian | |
| Schwarz Gastropoden Formation | Devonian | |
| Alticola Limestone | Silurian | |
| Blumau Formation | Silurian | |
| Cardiola Formation | Silurian | |
| Megarella Formation | Silurian | |
| Wolayer Formation | Late Ordovician | |

== See also ==
- List of fossiliferous stratigraphic units in Europe
  - List of fossiliferous stratigraphic units in Germany
  - List of fossiliferous stratigraphic units in Czech Republic
  - List of fossiliferous stratigraphic units in Slovakia
  - List of fossiliferous stratigraphic units in Hungary
  - List of fossiliferous stratigraphic units in Slovenia
  - List of fossiliferous stratigraphic units in Italy
  - List of fossiliferous stratigraphic units in Switzerland
