= Travenanzes Formation =

Geological formation in Italy

- Stratigraphic range: early Carnian (Tuvalian); ~232–230 Ma
- Type: Geologic formation
- Underlies: Dolomia Principale
- Overlies: Heiligkreuz Formation (unconformably)

Lithology
- Primary: Dolomite
- Other: Limestone, marl

Location
- Coordinates: 46.2°N 11.1°E
- Approximate paleocoordinates: 18.6°N 17.0°E
- Region: Trentino-Alto Adigo
- Country: Italy
- Extent: Southern Limestone Alps
- Travenanzes Formation (Italy)

The Travenanzes Formation is a Late Triassic (early Carnian, or early Tuvalian in the regional stratigraphy) limestone, marl and dolomite formation in the Southern Limestone Alps in Trentino-Alto Adige, Italy.

== Description ==
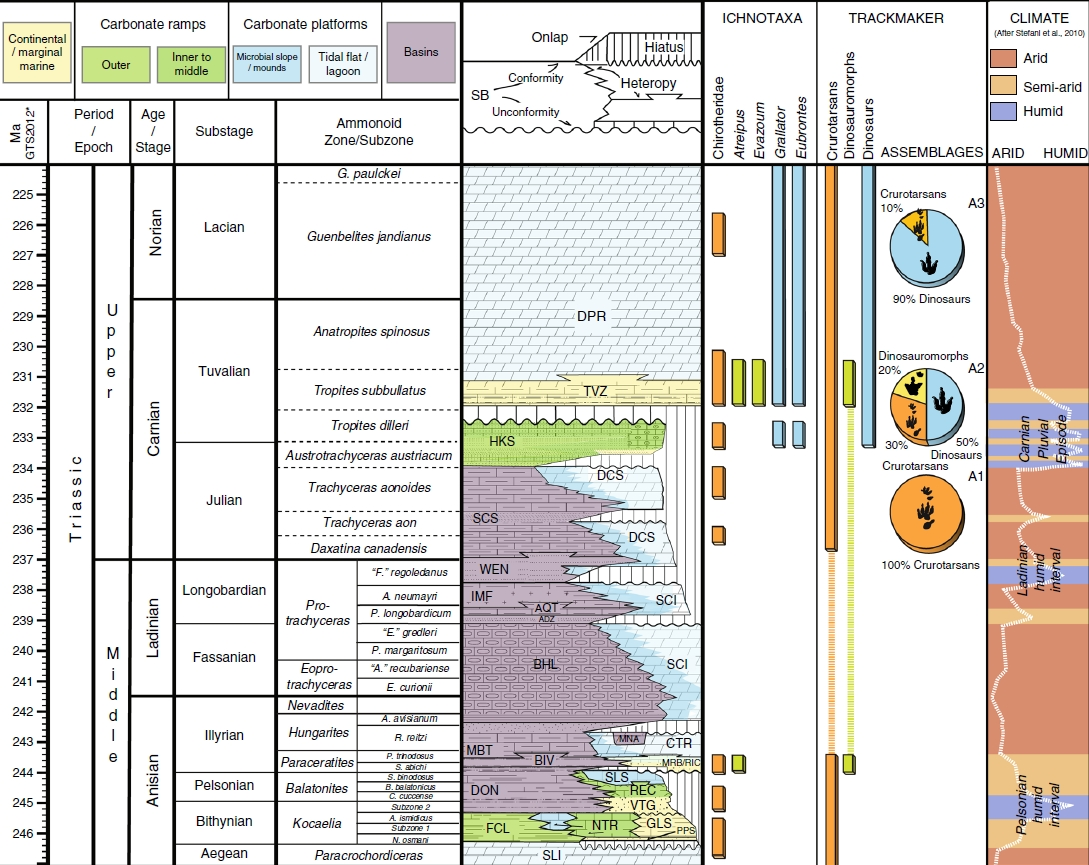
Stratigraphy of the Dolomites

The Travenanzes Formation is conformably overlain by the Dolomia Principale, and overlies the Heiligkreuz Formation separated by an unconformity. Deposition of the formation took place just after the Carnian Pluvial Event (CPE).

== Fossil content ==
The following fossils have been described from the Travenanzes Formation:

Ichnofossils

- Atreipus sp.
- Evazoum sp.
- Grallator (Eubrontes)
- Crocodylomorpha indet.

== See also ==
- List of fossiliferous stratigraphic units in Italy
- Montemarcello Formation
- Schlern Formation
- Wetterstein Formation
