= List of fossiliferous stratigraphic units in Slovenia =

Fossil-bearing stratigraphic units found in Slovenia span time periods from the Carboniferous to the Neogene.

== Stratigraphic formations ==
Group or Formation	Period	Notes
Black Limestone Formation	Cretaceous	
Born Formation	Permian	
Braunlicher Plattenkalk Formation	Triassic	
Coprolitic Horizon Formation	Neogene	
Dachstein Formation	Triassic	
Dovžan Gorge Formation	Permian	
Gornji Grad Formation	Paleogene	
Gornji Grad Beds Formation	Paleogene	
Grenzland Formation	Permian	
Kras Group/Trstelj Formation	Paleogene	
Lechkogel Formation	Triassic	
Liburnian Formation	Cretaceous	
Lipca Formation	Cretaceous	
Lipica Formation	Cretaceous	
Lithiotid Horizon Formation	Jurassic	
Lower Diplopora Limestone Formation	Triassic	
Lower Pseudoschwagerina Limestone Formation	Carboniferous	
Neoschwagerina Beds Formation	Permian	
Ortnek Formation	Permian	
Raibl Formation	Triassic	
Schwarzer Kalk Formation	Triassic	
Slatnik Formation	Triassic	
Trogkofel Formation	Permian	
Zazar Formation	Permian	

== See also ==
- Lists of fossiliferous stratigraphic units in Europe
