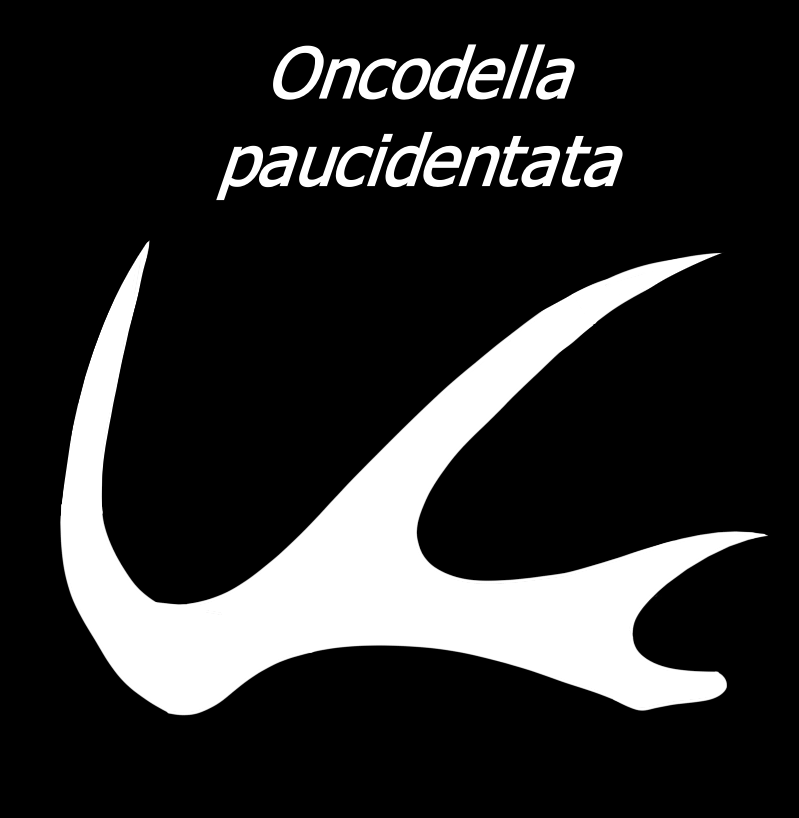
- Diagram of Oncodella paucidentata

Scientific classification
- Kingdom: Animalia
- Phylum: Chordata
- Class: †Conodonta
- Order: †Prioniodontida
- Family: †Coleodontidae
- Genus: †Oncodella Mosher 1968

= Oncodella =

Oncodella Temporal range: Norian–Rhaetian

Extinct genus of jawless fishes

Oncodella is an extinct genus of Late Triassic (latest Norian to early Rhaetian) conodont. The genus was given the type species Oncodella idiodentica by Mosher (1968), on the basis of fossils from the Late Triassic of Austria. However, Mosher (1969) later revised the species name to Oncodella paucidentata, since identical fossils from the same area were previously given the name Hindeodella paucidentata by Mostler (1967).

Like many genera which occupied the last phases of conodont evolution, Oncodella was atavistic and relatively simple in form, possibly due to environmental stresses. The origin of the genus is poorly understood. The common type species, Oncodella paucidentata, had a rod-like lower bar hosting a row of three to five denticles (tooth-like spines). The denticles were elongated, thin, and widely-spaced. They tilted backwards, especially towards the back of the platform. An extremely rare second species, Oncodella mostleri, is only known from Hungary. It had three to four smaller denticles between the first and second large denticles, as well as a short rear bar without denticles.

== Occurrence ==
=== Tethyan region ===
Oncodella is most common in European outcrops corresponding to the western Tethys Ocean. It was first reported from the Someraukogel and Steinbergkogel sites near Hallstatt in Austria. At outcrops B and C of Steinbergkogel, Oncodella first occurs alongside Misikella hernsteini and morphotype A of Epigondolella mosheri. These conodonts first appear near the end of the Sevatian (late Norian), only a short time before the base of the Rhaetian. This indicates that Oncodella first evolved in the latest Norian as well. Oncodella is also known from other outcrops in the Northern Calcareous Alps. These include Dachstein reef facies at Gosausee in Austria, and the Donnerkogel Formation at Mount Hohes Brett in Germany.

In Sicily, Oncodella is a common early Rhaetian conodont which co-occurs alongside Misikella posthernsteini. It has been found in the Portella Gebia limestone of the Pizzo Mondello section, as well as the Calcari con Selce ("cherty limestone") formation at Monte Triona. Calcari con Selce outcrops of the Italian mainland, such as the Pignola, Vietri di Potenza, and Pezza la Quagliara sections, have also produced Oncodella fossils. Despite being characteristic of the early Rhaetian (as defined by the first appearance of M. posthernsteini), Oncodella actually first appears in the Norian, slightly before M. posthernsteini.

Reworked Oncodella fossils have been found in the Western Carpathians. Oncodella is one of several conodonts used to determine the age of limestone pebbles within Jurassic and Cretaceous-age conglomerate. Conglomerate in Slovakia is known to preserve Oncodella within Rhaetian limestone pebbles transitional between Hallstatt and Zlambach facies. Turonian-age conglomerate from the Sromowce Formation of Poland preserves late Norian pebbles, as indicated by the presence of Oncodella and absence of Misikella posthernsteini. Oncodella fossils have been found in non-reworked limestone in the area as well. The Carnian-Rhaetian Silická Brezová sequence of Slovakia is one of the most well-studied examples of these types of sites. Further south in Hungary, the Csővár Formation has produced not only the typical Norian-Rhaetian Oncodella paucidentata species, but also a new early Norian species, Oncodella mostleri.

Oncodella is a component of Norian-Rhaetian conodont faunas in the Julian Alps of Slovenia. In the Triassic, this area was a deep basin (the Slovenian Basin) nowadays represented by the limestone-dominated Slatnik Formation, as well as the Bača Dolomite. At the Mount Kobla section of the Slatnik Formation, Oncodella first appears in the upper part of the Sevatian-age Parvigondolella andrusovi-Misikella hernsteini conodont zone. However, it only occupies a relatively short interval of time which bridges the Norian-Rhaetian Boundary. Albania and Serbia are other Balkan states known to produce Oncodella fossils. It has also been found along the Mediterranean in Turkey and Cyprus.

Although Oncodella has been reported from Asia, these reports are dubious. Claims of Oncodella being found in Kashmir originated from a fraudulent conodont researcher. "Oncodella obuti" was named from Olenekian-age material in southern Primorye of southeast Russia, but it may actually represent an S element of Neostrachanognathus.

=== Panthalassan region ===
Oncodella is typically not found in areas corresponding to Panthalassa, the giant proto-Pacific Ocean. It also persists for a shorter period of time, with no late Norian record and a reduced Rhaetian record. However, it is a notable part of the early Rhaetian conodont fauna of the San Hipolito Formation in Baja California Sur, Mexico. The oldest Oncodella fossils in this area are found at the INB section, a sampled section of the formation's sandstone member. At INB, it first appears in the Proparvicingla moniliformis 2a radiolarian assemblage zone. At least in the San Hipolito Formation, Oncodella has a similar stratigraphic range to Epigondolella mosheri sensu lato, a conodont often used to establish the early Rhaetian in North America. Oncodella also occurs at the COB section, although it first appears in the slightly younger moniliformis 2b zone. Oncodella goes extinct at the end of the moniliformis 2c zone in Baja California Sur.

A single Oncodella specimen has been found alongside moniliformis 2a-zone radiolarians in the Sandilands Formation of Kunga Island in British Columbia, Canada. Other Tethyan-type conodonts are also extremely rare or absent from Canada. The more notable presence of Tethyan-type conodonts in Mexico may be indicative of biogeographical pressures on conodonts. Oncodella could be considered a low-latitude conodont, since it is practically absent in northern Panthalassa (now accreted onto Canada) and more common in low-latitude areas of the Panthalassa and Tethys oceans (now accreted onto Mexico and Europe, respectively).
