= Loibl =

Loibl may refer to:

- Loibl Pass, mountain pass in the Alps, linking Austria with Slovenia
- Loibl Formation, geologic formation in Austria
- Kevin James Loibl, assassin of Christina Grimmie
- Torsten Loibl (born 1972), German basketball coach

== See also ==
- Loidl
