= Bombassei =

Bombassei is an Italian surname. Notable people with the surname include:

- Alberto Bombassei (born 1940), an Italian billionaire businessman
- Diego Bombassei (born 1971), an Italian curler
- Valter Bombassei (born 1289), an Italian curler

== See also ==
- Bombaso
