= Flugopterus =

Flugopterus Temporal range: Carnian

Scientific classification
- Kingdom: Animalia
- Phylum: Chordata
- Class: Actinopterygii
- Order: †Pholidophoriformes
- Genus: †Flugopterus; Whitley, 1951
- Species: †F. raiblianus

Binomial name
- †Flugopterus raiblianus (Kner, 1866)

Synonyms
- Megalopterus raiblianus Kner, 1866

Extinct genus of fishes

.

Flugopterus is an extinct genus of prehistoric bony fish that lived during the early Carnian stage of the Late Triassic epoch. It contains a single species, F. raiblianus (Kner, 1887), previously placed in the genus †Megalopterus Kner, 1866 which was found to be preoccupied. It is known from the Raibl Formation of Austria. It likely belongs in the order Pholidophoriformes.
