= Dachstein Formation =

Geologic formation in the southeastern Alps of Europe

- Stratigraphic range: Norian-Rhaetian; ~221–202 Ma
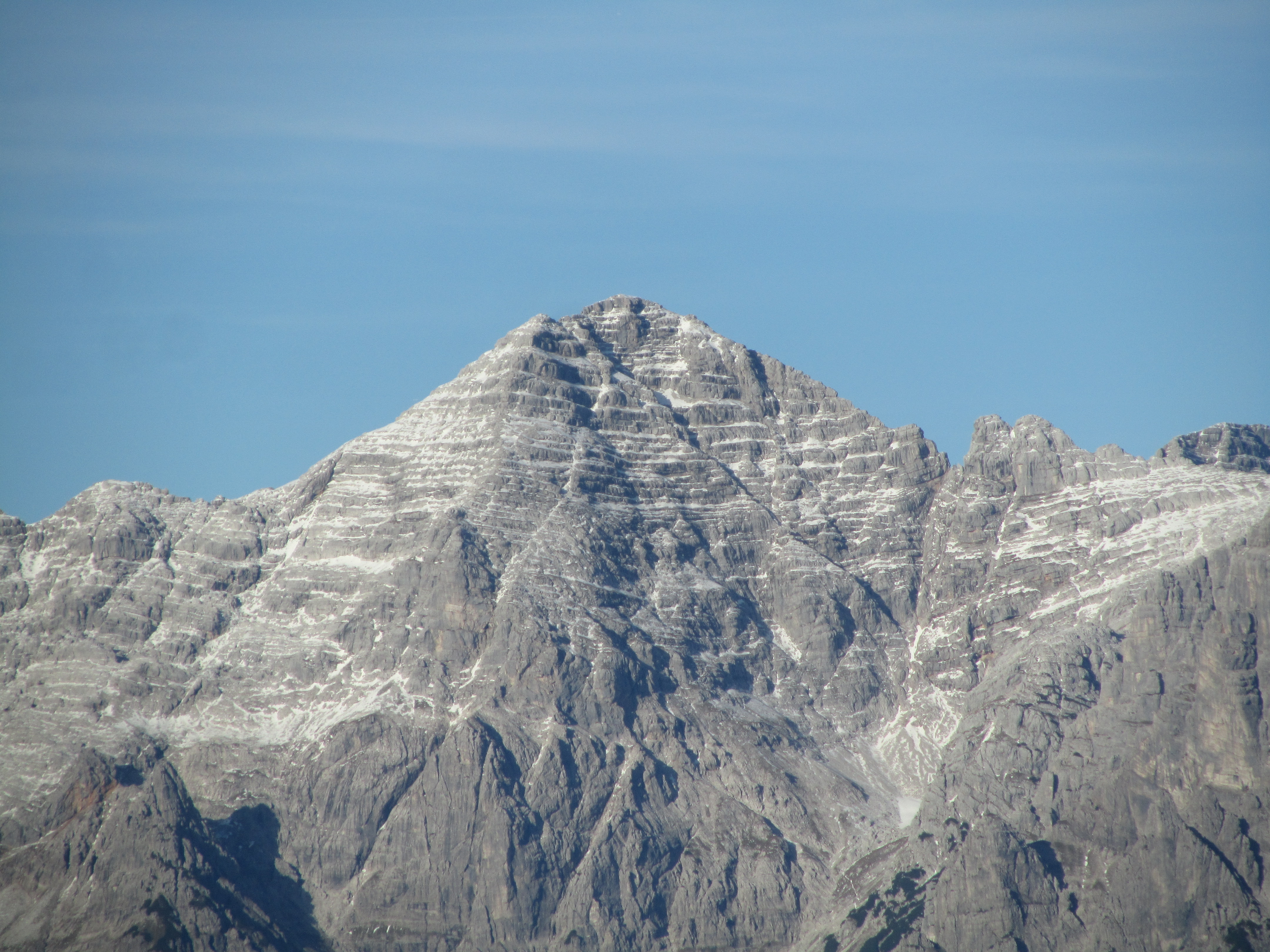
- Well bedded Dachstein limestones forming a distinctively stepped profile with clearly defined boundaries on the face of the Mitterhorn (2,506 m) in the Lofer Alps.
- Type: Formation

Lithology
- Primary: Limestone

Location
- Coordinates: 47.6°N 14.0°E
- Approximate paleocoordinates: 25.4°N 17.6°E
- Region: Styria, Veszprém, Bessuno, Brescia, South Tyrol
- Country: Austria, Germany, Hungary, Italy, Slovakia, Slovenia, Switzerland

Type section
- Named for: Dachstein Mountains
- Named by: Friedrich Simony
- Dachstein Formation (Alps)

The Dachstein Formation or Dachstein Limestone (German: Dachsteinkalk) is a lithostratigraphic term for a geologic formation of Triassic age. It is a carbonate sequence which forms prominent features in the Northern Limestone Alps and also crops out over a number of Tethyan mountain ranges in Austria, Germany, Hungary, Italy, Switzerland, Slovakia and Slovenia.

The Dachstein limestone was first formally described by the Austrian geologist Friedrich Simony in the 19th century, the type locality is the Dachstein Massif in the southern Salzkammergut region of Austria.

== Age and characteristics ==
The Triassic age of the Dachstein Formation can be established by the identification of characteristic fossils found within it. Because the Dachstein Limestone is a lithostratigraphic unit the time of deposition (in Ma before present) may be somewhat variable from place to place but in general terms deposition started in the late Carnian and continued through the Norian and into the Rhaetian stages of the Late Triassic period.

The sequence reaches 1800m in thickness and can be sub-divided into (i) well bedded limestones and (ii) a more massive facies, the massive limestone passes laterally southwards into the well bedded limestone which often includes thick and abundantly fossiliferous reef limestones.

=== The reef limestones ===
The Dachstein reefs were connected to lagoonal areas by narrow back-reef belts which now display massive to thick bedded limestones with ooids, oncoids and other coated grains, algae and reef debris. The patch reefs and detrital limestones had a very rich fauna and flora, more than 50 species have been identified in the reef framework with at least the same number as benthonic reef-dwellers.

=== The bedded limestone ===
The bedded limestone is the most widespread facies and this unit is layered on the scale of metres to tens of metres. The thickness of the layers and the clearly defined boundaries often produces a distinctively stepped or banded appearance so the layering can be visible from significant distances in large cliff faces. There is evidence of shallow water cyclic sedimentation, the details of the layered units and their cyclical nature was first described by Alfred G. Fischer and the cycling beds are commonly referred to as Lofer cyclothems (after the excellent exposures in the Lofer facies of the Lofer Mountains).

The sequence as a whole has been interpreted as having formed in a peritidal setting with the cyclic units comprising lagoonal limestones, thin layers of variegated argillaceous material, thin layers of intertidal to supratidal laminated dolomites and dolomitic limestone. The cylicity has been attributed to periodic fluctuations of sea-level, superimposed on the general subsidence. An amplitude of up to 15 m and a periodicity of 20,000 to 100,000 years has been inferred for each cycle. It has been suggested that the sea-level changes were orbitally controlled and can be interpreted by Milankovitch processes.

== Palaeogeography and structure ==
The sequence was deposited on the NW margin of the Alpine Tethys. The Dachstein reefs fringed the lagoons of the inner Dachstein platform and they generally faced the open oceanic basin to the south.

The rock units overlying the Dachstein carbonates generally sit unconformably on the carbonates and at many places the Triassic-Jurassic boundary is missing because of the stratigraphic gap. Various reasons have been suggested to explain why the deposition of Dachstein carbonates ceased, amongst the mechanisms suggested are (a) a tectonically driven platform drowning event terminating shallow marine platform sedimentation (the onset of extensional tectonics) (b) a cessation of carbonate production due to emergence caused by a significant sea level fall (c) changes in ocean chemistry caused by the end-Triassic extinction which led to a change in carbonate production and the ecological collapse of reefs.

In the field the Dachstein limestones commonly show broad open flexures on the scale of hundreds of metres. Detailed lithological and palaeontological examination shows that there is significant repetition of units indicating that the sequence is built of a pile of near-horizontal thrust sheets, although there is very limited disturbance along the contact between the sheets and they are not intensely folded.

Parts of the Dachstein Platform are now preserved in various tectonic units disrupted during the Alpine orogeny, significant elements occur in the Austroalpine nappes of the Northern Limestone Alps, other parts are in the Transdanubian Mountains of Hungary and the Julian Alps.

== Fossil content ==
Fossils dated to the Norian and Rhaetian stages of the Late Triassic are particularly well represented and the Dachstein limestone of the Northern Limestone Alps has become a classical palaeontological study site because of the exceptionally diverse Norian-Rhaetian reef biota.

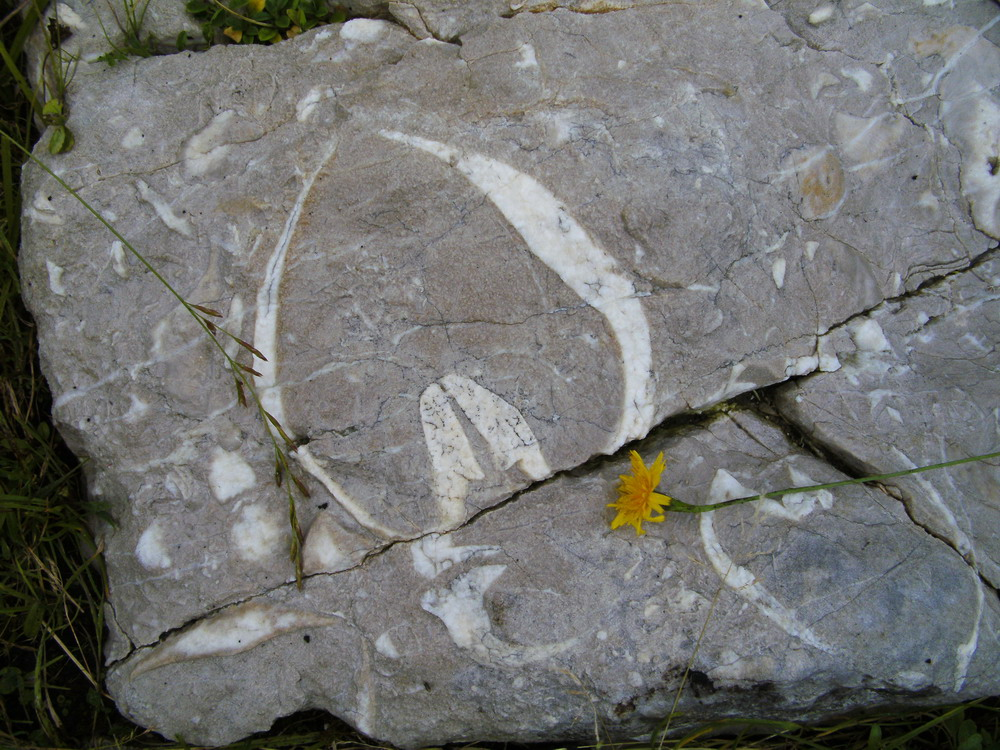
A cross section of a Megalodon bivalve as typically seen in the Dachstein Limestone

A commonly observed fossil is the Megalodon (bivalve) which can be as large as 20 cm across. Among others fossils reported from the formation are:

Reptiles

- Mystriosuchus planirostris

Invertebrates

- Agathammina austroalpina
- Cnemidium vallisnerii
- Dicerocardium curionii
- D. jani
- Megalodus hoernesi
- M. laczkoi
- Involutina communis
- I. gaschei
- I. tenuis
- Nodosaria ordinata
- Rhaetina gregaria
- Semiinvoluta clari
- Triasina oberhauseri
- Trocholina acuta
- T. alpina
- T. permodiscoides
- Alpinophragmium sp.
- Involutina sp.
- Nodosaria sp.

== See also ==
- List of fossiliferous stratigraphic units in Austria
- List of fossiliferous stratigraphic units in Germany
- List of fossiliferous stratigraphic units in Hungary
- List of fossiliferous stratigraphic units in Italy
- List of fossiliferous stratigraphic units in Slovakia
- List of fossiliferous stratigraphic units in Slovenia
- List of fossiliferous stratigraphic units in Switzerland
