= Plassen =

Plassen may refer to:

== Places ==
- Plassen, Alvdal, a village in Alvdal Municipality in Innlandet county, Norway
- Plassen, Trysil, a village in Trysil Municipality in Innlandet county, Norway
- Plassen Church, a church in Trysil Municipality in Innlandet county, Norway
- Plassen (Molde), a building located in the town of Molde in Molde Municipality, Møre og Romsdal county, Norway
- Plassen Formation, a geologic formation in Austria
