= Corona Formation =

Geologic formation in Austria and Italy

- Stratigraphic range: Early Gzhelian; ~303–302 Ma
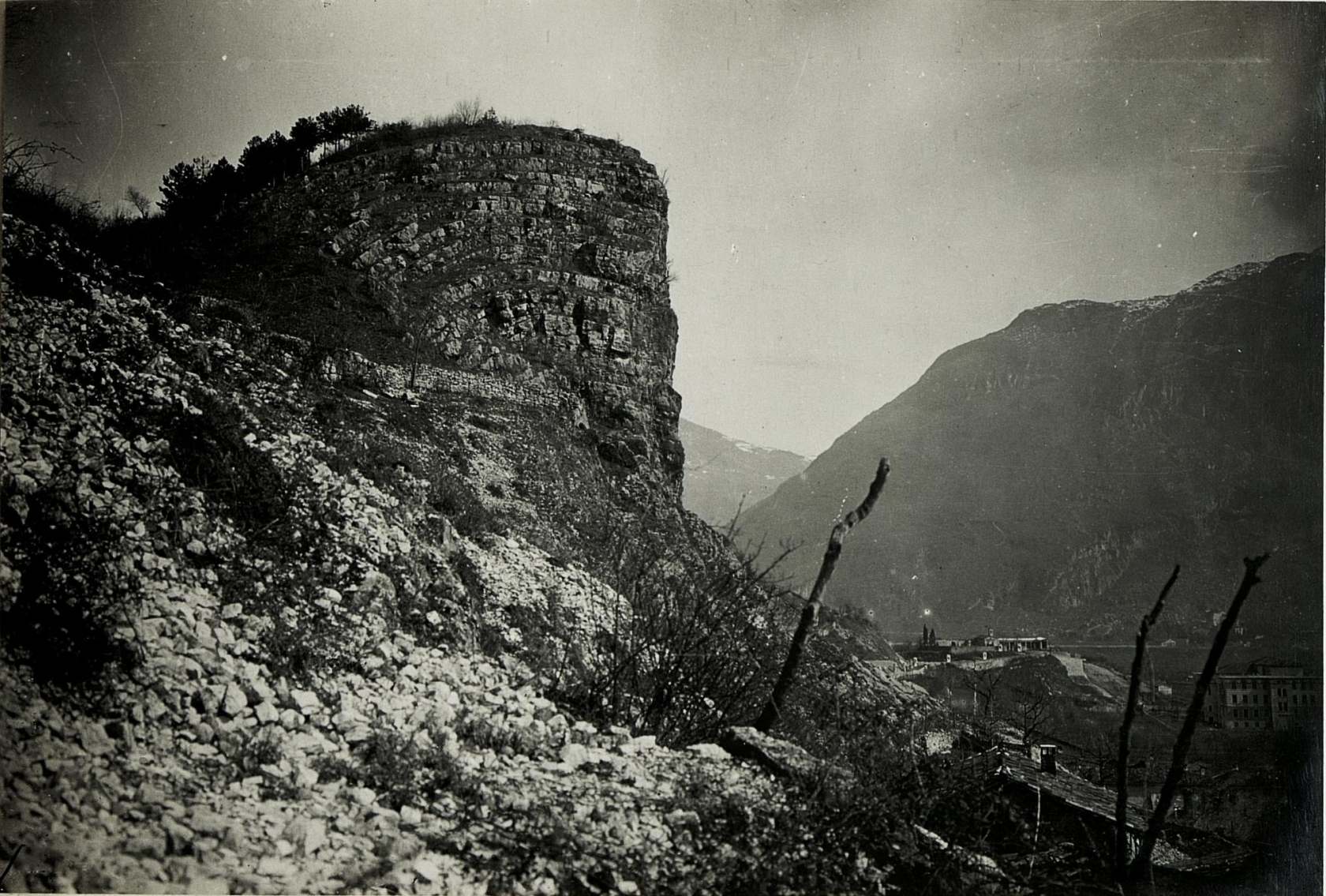
- Monte Corona, Austrian side
- Type: Formation
- Unit of: Pramollo Group
- Underlies: Auernig Formation
- Overlies: Pezzul Formation
- Thickness: 300 m (980 ft)

Lithology
- Primary: Conglomerate
- Other: Sandstone, mudstone

Location
- Coordinates: 46.5°N 13.3°E
- Approximate paleocoordinates: 10.9°N 23.7°E
- Region: Kronalpe; Udine
- Country: Austria; Italy
- Extent: Carnian Alps

Type section
- Named for: Monte Corona
- Corona Formation (Austria)

The Corona Formation is a geologic formation of the Carnian Alps at the border of Austria and Italy. It preserves fossils dated to the Gzhelian stage of the Late Carboniferous period.

The 300-metre (980 ft) thick formation comprises deposited in a deltaic environment. The Corona Formation has provided fossils of fish, brachiopods, a bryozoan, an insect, fossil flora including trunks and ichnofossils ascribed to Limnopus. The tracks from the Corona Formation include the oldest record of tetrapod tracks from the Southern Alps. The rugose coral Amplexus coronae was named after the formation.

== Description ==
The Corona Formation was defined as a formation by Venturini in 1990. It is the lowermost Gzhelian unit in the late Pennsylvanian Pramollo Group, overlying the Kasimovian Pizzul Formation and overlain by the Auernig Formation in the Carnian Alpine border region of Austria and Italy. The mountains Monte Auernig, Monte Carnizza and the eponymous Monte Corona are composed of the formation. The formation is a 300-metre (980 ft) thick succession, characterized by alternating quartz conglomerates, sandstones and mudstones. The conglomerates are coarse infillings of distributary channels in a deltaic environment. The formation is characterized by cyclothems (parasequences) of 30 to 40 metres (98 to 131 ft) thick.

== Fossil content ==
The Corona Formation has provided fossils of:

- Fish
  - Petalodontiformes
    - Petalodontidae
      - Petalodus ohioensis
- Insects
  - Palaeodictyoptera
    - Dictyoneuridae
      - Arltia carnica
- Rugose corals
  - Zaphrentis omaliusi
  - Lopholasma carbonaria
  - Amplexus coronae
- Strophomenata
  - Productida
    - Rugosochonetidae
      - Capillomesolobus pontebbanus
      - Paramesolobus sp.
- Bryozoa
  - Rhombocladia delicata
- Foraminifera
  - Badyina lucida
  - Hemidiscus sp.
- Ichnofossils
  - Limnopus

The tracks of Limnopus from the Corona Formation represent the oldest record of tetrapod tracks from the Southern Alps.

=== Flora ===
The formation has also provided abundant, well-preserved and diverse plant assemblages in coal-rich levels of up to 30 centimetres (12 in) in the fine sandstones and shaly levels of the Corona Formation. Therein, sphenophyte trunks with a diameter of up to 20 centimetres (7.9 in) are preserved in situ. The genus Lebachia, typically known from the Permian, is not found in other Carboniferous strata in the Alps. The flora is of importance as one of the earliest examples of rebound after the Carboniferous rainforest collapse.

- Acitheca polymorpha
- Annularia carinata
- Anthracoporella sp.
- Calamites carinatus
- Lepidodendron cf. subdichotum
- Linopteris neuropteroides
- Neuropteris cordata
- Paripteris cf. linguaefolia
- Pseudomariopteris busquetii
- Alethopteris sp.
- Pecopteris sp.
- Polymorphopteris sp.

== See also ==
- List of fossiliferous stratigraphic units in Austria
- List of fossiliferous stratigraphic units in Italy
- Bajo de Véliz Formation, contemporaneous fossil flora-bearing formation of Argentina
- Ganigobis Formation, contemporaneous fossil fish-bearing formation of Namibia
