= Pielach Formation =

Geologic formation in Austria

- Stratigraphic range: Chattian (late Kiscellian-early Egerian); 28.4–23 Ma
- Type: Formation
- Underlies: Melk Formation
- Overlies: Basement

Lithology
- Primary: Mudstone, sandstone

Location
- Coordinates: 48.2°N 15.2°E
- Approximate paleocoordinates: 46.2°N 14.0°E
- Region: Lower Austria
- Country: Austria

Type section
- Named for: Pielach
- Pielach Formation (Austria)

The Pielach Formation is a geologic formation in Lower Austria, Austria. It preserves fossils dated to the Chattian age (late Kiscellian to early Egerian) of the Oligocene Epoch. The formation unconformably overlies basement rock, and is overlain by the Melk Formation.

== Fossil content ==
The formation has provided fossils of:

Bivalves

- Acanthocardia bojorum
- Acanthocardia bokorum
- Angulus (Peronidia)
- Anomia ephippium
- Corbula (Caryocorbula) carinata
- Cordiopsis incrassata
- Crassostrea fimbriata
- Diplodonta (Diplodonta) rotundata
- Gari protracta
- Isognomon (Hippochaeta) maxillatus
- Lucinella divaricata
- Lutraria (Lutraria) sanna
- Macrocallista beyrichi
- Mytilopsis basteroti
- Mytilus (Crenomytilus) aquitanicus
- Polymesoda subarata
- Saxolucina heberti
- Scapharca (Scapharca) diluvii
- Thracia ventricosa
- Teredo sp.
- Cardiidae indet.

Gastropods

- Agapilia picta
- Bullia hungarica
- Calyptraea chinensis
- Cochlis tigrina
- Euspira helicina
- Granulolabium plicatum
- Melanopsis impressa
- Mesohalina margaritaceus
- Theodoxus crenulatus
- Turritella (Haustator) venus

== See also ==
- List of fossiliferous stratigraphic units in Austria
