= Weissenegg Formation =

Geologic formation in Austria

- Stratigraphic range: Mid Miocene; ~16–11.6 Ma
- Type: Formation
- Unit of: Baden Group

Lithology
- Primary: Sandstone, siltstone
- Other: Limestone, marl

Location
- Coordinates: 46.7°N 15.6°E
- Approximate paleocoordinates: 46.1°N 15.1°E
- Region: Styria
- Country: Austria

Type section
- Named for: Weissenegg
- Weissenegg Formation (Austria)

The Weissenegg Formation is a geologic formation in Austria. It preserves fossils dating back to the Miocene period.

== Fossil content ==
Various fossils have been found in the formation.

=== Fish ===
- Aetobatus arcuatus
- Araloselachus cuspidata
- Carcharias acutissima
- Carcharhinus priscus
- Chaenogaleus affinis
- Dasyatis delfortriei
- Dasyatis rugosa
- Galeocerdo aduncus
- Ginglymostoma delfortriei
- Hemipristis serra
- Isurus hastalis
- Megalodon
- Myliobatis sp.
- Negaprion sp.
- Notidanus primigenius
- Rhinoptera schultzi
- Rhinoptera studeri
- Rhizoprionodon fischeuri

=== Mammals ===
- Metaxytherium medium

== See also ==
- List of fossiliferous stratigraphic units in Austria
