= Schreyeralm Formation =

Geologic formation in Austria and Germany

- Stratigraphic range: Triassic
- Type: Formation

Location
- Country: Austria, Germany

The Schreyeralm Formation is a geologic formation in Austria and Germany. It preserves fossils dating back to the Triassic period.

== See also ==
- List of fossiliferous stratigraphic units in Austria
- List of fossiliferous stratigraphic units in Germany
