= Waschberg Formation =

Austrian geological formation

- Stratigraphic range: Ypresian-Lutetian
- Type: Formation

Lithology
- Primary: Limestone

Location
- Country: Austria

The Waschberg Formation is a geologic formation in Austria. It preserves fossils dated to the Paleogene period.

== See also ==
- List of fossiliferous stratigraphic units in Austria
