= List of fossiliferous stratigraphic units in Slovakia =

Group or Formation	Period	Notes
Baden Formation	Neogene	
Bleskový prameň Formation	Triassic	
Bohunice Formation	Jurassic	
Borové Formation	Paleogene	
Czajakowa Radiolarite Formation	Jurassic	
Dachstein limestones Formation	Triassic	
Durstyn Formation	Cretaceous	
Dursztyn Formation	Cretaceous	
Fatra Formation	Triassic	
Filakovo Formation	Neogene	
Hallstätt Formation	Triassic	
Hallstätterkalk Formation	Triassic	
Holic Formation	Neogene	
Hybe Formation	Triassic	
Ivanka Formation	Neogene	
Jaworki Formation or Púchov Marlstone Formation	Cretaceous	
Korytnica Limestones Formation	Triassic	
Kysuca Formation	Cretaceous	
Kössen Formation	Triassic	
Ladce Formation	Cretaceous	
Litava Formation	Neogene	
Meliata Formation	Triassic	
Mraznica Formation	Cretaceous	
Nadaska Limestones Formation	Triassic	
Norovica Formation	Triassic	
Pieniny Limestone Formation	Cretaceous	
Podtatranska Group/Borove Formation	Paleogene	
Praznov Formation	Cretaceous	
Proč Conglomerate Formation	Paleogene	
Raming Limestone Formation	Triassic	
Sebechleby Formation	Neogene	
Smolegowa Formation	Jurassic	
Sokolica Radiolarite Formation	Jurassic	
Steinalm Limestones Formation	Triassic	
Steinalm Limestones Formation	Triassic	
Studienka Formation	Neogene	
Tisovec Limestone Formation	Triassic	
Tomanová Formation	Triassic	
Veterlin Formation	Triassic	
Vysoka Formation	Triassic	
Wetterstein Formation	Triassic	
Zamostie Limestone Formation	Triassic	
Zlatník Formation	Carboniferous	

== See also ==
- Lists of fossiliferous stratigraphic units in Europe
