= Nötsch Formation =

Geologic formation in Austria

- Stratigraphic range: Serpukhovian-Moscovian (Alportian); ~326–315 Ma
- Type: Formation

Lithology
- Primary: Breccia, siltstone

Location
- Coordinates: 46.6°N 13.6°E
- Approximate paleocoordinates: 15.9°S 20.6°E
- Region: Carinthia
- Country: Austria
- Extent: Carnic Alps

Type section
- Named for: Nötsch
- Nötsch Formation (Austria)

The Nötsch Formation is a geologic formation in the Carnic Alps of southern Austria. It preserves fossils dated to the Serpukhovian to Moscovian ages of the Carboniferous period.

== Fossil content ==
The following fossils were reported from the formation:

Arachnids

- Aphantomartus pustulatus

Ophiocistioidea

- Anguloserra austriaca
- A. carinthiaca
- Rotasaccus sp.

== See also ==
- List of fossiliferous stratigraphic units in Austria
