= Zweikofel Formation =

Geologic formation in Austria

- Stratigraphic range: Permian
- Type: Formation

Location
- Country: Austria

The Zweikofel Formation is a geologic formation in Austria. It preserves fossils dated to the Permian period.

== See also ==
- List of fossiliferous stratigraphic units in Austria
