= List of fossiliferous stratigraphic units in Italy =

| Group or Formation | Period | Notes |
|---|---|---|
| Angolo Formation | Triassic | |
| Arenaria di Ponsano Formation | Neogene | |
| Argille di Viano Formation | Cretaceous | |
| Argille Varicolori Formation | Cretaceous | |
| Argilliti di Riva di Solto Formation | Triassic | |
| Auernig Formation | Carboniferous | |
| Auernig Group/Meledis Formation | Carboniferous | |
| Avella Formation | Paleogene | |
| Bari Limestone Formation | Cretaceous | |
| Baucina Formation | Neogene | |
| Bellerophon Formation | Permian | |
| Belluno Glauconitic Sandstone Formation | Paleogene | |
| Besano Formation | Triassic | |
| Biancone Formation | Cretaceous | |
| Black Limestones Formation | Jurassic | |
| Bolognano Formation | Neogene | |
| Braies Formation | Triassic | |
| Braies Group/Prags Group/Dont Formation | Triassic | |
| Breno Formation | Triassic | |
| Buchenstein Formation | Triassic | |
| Bugarone Formation | Cretaceous, Jurassic | |
| Bugarone superiore Formation | Jurassic | |
| Cabitza Limestone Formation | Cambrian | |
| Calcare di Altamura | Cretaceous | |
| Calcare del Clapsavon | Triassic | |
| Calcare di Angolo | Triassic | |
| Calcare di Bari | Cretaceous | |
| Calcare di Cellina | Cretaceous | |
| Calcare di Dosso dei Morti | Triassic | |
| Calcare di Meride | Triassic | |
| Calcare di Perledo Group/Perledo Formation | Triassic | |
| Calcare di Prezzo | Triassic | |
| Calcare di Recoaro | Triassic | |
| Calcare di Sogno | Jurassic | |
| Calcare di Zorzino | Triassic | |
| Calcare di Zu | Triassic | |
| Calcare Selcifero di Fonzaso | Jurassic | |
| Calcarenite di Gravina | Neogene | |
| Calcareniti di Castelgomberto | Paleogene | |
| Calcari Formation | Triassic | |
| Calcari ad aptici e Saccocoma | Jurassic | |
| Calcari con Selce Formation | Triassic | |
| Calcari di Melissano | Cretaceous | |
| Calcari Grigi Formation | Jurassic | |
| Calcari Grigi Group/Loppio Oolitic Limestone Formation | Jurassic | |
| Calcari Grigi Group/Monte Zugna Formation | Jurassic | |
| Calcari Grigi Group/Rotzo Formation | Jurassic | |
| Calcari nummulitici Formation | Paleogene | |
| Calcari Oolitici di S. Vigilio Formation | Jurassic | |
| Calvene Formation | Paleogene | |
| Camorelli Formation | Triassic | |
| Carlentini Formation | Neogene | |
| Carnitza Formation | Triassic | |
| Casa Poggio ai Lecci Formation | Neogene | |
| Cassiano Formation | Triassic | |
| Castelgomberto Formation | Paleogene | |
| Castell'Arquato Formation | Neogene | |
| Castro Limestone Formation | Paleogene | |
| Cave del Predil Formation | Triassic | |
| Cesarea Limestone Formation | Cretaceous | |
| Cessole Formation | Neogene | |
| Chiampo Formation | Paleogene | |
| Chiampo Marble Formation | Paleogene | |
| Cima delle Murelle Formation | Cretaceous | |
| Ciolo Limestone Formation | Cretaceous | |
| Calcare di Mendicino | Neogene | |
| Col dei Schiosi Limestone Formation | Cretaceous | |
| Conchodon Formation | Triassic | |
| Corniola Formation | Jurassic | |
| Corona Formation | Carboniferous | |
| Costabella Group/Werfen Formation | Triassic | |
| Dhahab Formation | Jurassic | |
| Dolomia di Forni | Triassic | |
| Dolomia Principale | Triassic | |
| Dolomie di Monti Fiumata Formation | Triassic | |
| Domusnovas Formation | Ordovician | |
| Dont Formation | Triassic | |
| Dosso dei Morti Formation | Triassic | |
| Dürrenstein Formation | Triassic | |
| Ellipsactinia Limestones Formation | Jurassic | |
| Erice Formation | Jurassic | |
| Esino Formation | Triassic | |
| Fanes Encrinite Formation | Jurassic | |
| Fluminimaggiore Formation | Devonian, Silurian | |
| Fonzaso Formation | Jurassic | |
| Forni Dolostone | Triassic | |
| Galatina Dolomite Formation | Cretaceous | |
| Gessoso Formation | Neogene | |
| Gonnesa Group/Gonnesa Formation | Cambrian | |
| Gonnesa Group/Planu Sartu Formation | Cambrian | |
| Gonnesa Group/Santa Barbara Formation | Cambrian | |
| Gorno Formation | Triassic | |
| Gracilis Formation | Triassic | |
| Grodner Conglomerate Formation | Permian | |
| Grodner Folge Formation | Permian | |
| Groedner Sandstein Formation | Permian | |
| Hauptdolomit Group/Quattervals Formation | Triassic | |
| Heiligkreuz Formation | Triassic | |
| Heiligkreuz Group/Dürrestein Formation | Triassic | |
| Iglesias Group/Campo Pisano Formation | Cambrian | |
| Inferior Oolite Group/Calcare di Scagliera Formation | Cretaceous | |
| Inici Formation | Jurassic | |
| Kendlbach Formation | Jurassic | |
| Kronhof Limestone Formation | Carboniferous | |
| La Valle Formation | Triassic | |
| Langhiano Formation | Neogene | |
| Latemar Limestone Formation | Triassic | |
| Latimusa Formation | Cretaceous | |
| Lercara Formation | Permian | |
| Libano Sandstone Formation | Neogene | |
| Livinallongo Formation | Triassic | |
| Lombardische Kieselkalk Formation | Jurassic | |
| Maiolica Formation | Cretaceous, Jurassic | |
| Maraldi Sandstone Formation | Neogene | |
| Margon Limestone Formation | Triassic | |
| Marmolata Formation | Triassic | |
| Marna di Possagno Formation | Paleogene | |
| Marna di Priabona Formation | Paleogene | |
| Marna Euganea Formation | Paleogene | |
| Marne della Val di Centa Formation | Triassic | |
| Meledis Formation | Carboniferous | |
| Melissano Limestone Formation | Cretaceous | |
| Meride Formation | Triassic | |
| Molare Formation | Paleogene | |
| Moltrasio Formation | Jurassic | |
| Monte Alpe Cherts Formation | Jurassic | |
| Monte Cassio Flysch Formation | Cretaceous | |
| Montemarcello Formation | Triassic | |
| Monti Climiti Formation | Neogene | |
| Monticello Formation | Triassic | |
| Mt. Facito Formation | Triassic | |
| Muschelkalk Formation | Triassic | |
| Nago Limestone Formation | Paleogene | |
| Nebida Formation | Cambrian | |
| Nebida Group/Matoppa Formation | Cambrian | |
| Novaglie Formation | Neogene | |
| Ortovero Clay Formation | Neogene | |
| Palizzi Formation | Paleogene | |
| Panormide Formation | Triassic | |
| Perledo Formation | Triassic | |
| Pietra de cantoni Formation | Neogene | |
| Pietra Leccese Formation | Neogene | |
| Platydolomite Formation | Cretaceous | |
| Ponte Naja Formation | Italy | |
| Possagno Marl Formation | Paleogene | |
| Pratotondo Limestone Formation | Triassic | |
| Preplans Sandstone Formation | Neogene | |
| Prezzo Formation | Triassic | |
| Prezzo Limestone Formation | Triassic | |
| Quarziti de Monte Serra Formation | Triassic | |
| Quarziti di Monte Serra Formation | Triassic | |
| Radiolarite Formation | Jurassic | |
| Raibl Formation | Triassic | |
| Raibl Group/Chiampees Formation | Triassic | |
| Raibl Group/Conzen Formation | Triassic | |
| Raibl Group/Dolomia Principale Formation | Triassic | |
| Raibl Group/Predil Formation | Triassic | |
| Raibl Group/Rio del Lago Formation | Triassic | |
| Raibl Group/Tor Formation | Triassic | |
| Rattendorf Group/Lower Pseudoschwagerina Limestone Formation | Carboniferous | |
| Recoaro Formation | Triassic | |
| Rio del Lago Formation | Triassic | |
| Riva di Solto Formation | Triassic | |
| Riva di Solto Shale Formation | Triassic | |
| Rosignano Limestone Formation | Neogene | |
| Rosso ad Aptici Formation | Jurassic | |
| Rosso Ammonitico Formation | Cretaceous, Jurassic | |
| Rosso Ammonitico Medio Formation | Jurassic | |
| Rosso Ammonitico Veronese Formation | Jurassic | |
| Rotzo Formation | Jurassic | |
| Rugo Mizza Sandstone Formation | Neogene | |
| S. Spirito Formation | Paleogene | |
| Sabbie d'Asti Formation | Neogene | |
| Sabbie di Nugola Vecchia Formation | Italy | |
| Sabbie di S. Giusto Formation | Neogene | |
| Sabbie Gialle Formation | Neogene | |
| Salcedo Formation | Paleogene | |
| Salsomaggiore Formation | Neogene | |
| Saltrio Formation | Jurassic | |
| San Cassiano Formation | Triassic | |
| San Giorgio Formation | Carboniferous | |
| San Martino Calcarenite Formation | Neogene | |
| San Viligio Group/San Viligio Oolite Formation | Jurassic | |
| Sannicandro Formation | Jurassic | |
| Santa Maria di Ciciliano Formation | Neogene | |
| Scaglia Bianca Formation | Cretaceous | |
| Scaglia Rossa Formation | Cretaceous | |
| Scaglia Rossa Veneta Formation | Cretaceous | |
| Schlern Formation | Triassic | |
| Sciliar Dolomite Formation | Triassic | |
| Scisti a Fucoidi Formation | Cretaceous | |
| Sedrina Formation | Jurassic | |
| Sedrina Limestone Formation | Jurassic | |
| Seefeld Formation | Triassic | |
| Soccher Formation | Jurassic | |
| Terravecchia Formation | Neogene | |
| Tor Formation | Triassic | |
| Torrente Meduna Siltstone | Neogene | |
| Travenanzes Formation | Triassic | |
| Trieste Karst Limestone | Cretaceous | |
| Trogkofel Formation | Permian | |
| Uggiano La Chiesa Formation | Neogene | |
| Uggwa Formation | Ordovician | |
| Uggwa Limestone | Ordovician | |
| Val Degano Formation | Triassic | |
| Val di Centa Marls Formation | Triassic | |
| Val Gardena Formation | Permian | |
| Val Gardena Sandstone Formation | Permian | |
| Valldunga Formation | Neogene | |
| Verbicaro Unit Formation | Triassic | |
| Verruca Formation | Triassic | |
| Via Cortina d'Ampezzo Formation | Italy | |
| Villamagna Formation | Neogene | |
| Wengan Group/Cassian Formation | Triassic | |
| Wengen Formation | Triassic | |
| Werfen Formation | Triassic, Permian | |
| Zorzino Limestone Formation | Triassic | |
| Zu Limestone Formation | Triassic | |

== See also ==
- Lists of fossiliferous stratigraphic units in Europe
