= Eibiswald Formation =

Geologic formation in Austria

- Stratigraphic range: Langhian
- Type: Formation

Lithology
- Primary: Coal

Location
- Region: Styria
- Country: Austria

Type section
- Named for: Eibiswald

The Eibiswald Formation is a geologic formation in Austria. It preserves fossils dated to the Langhian age of the Miocene epoch.

== See also ==
- List of fossiliferous stratigraphic units in Austria
