= Retz Formation =

Geologic formation in Austria

- Stratigraphic range: Burdigalian
- Type: Formation

Lithology
- Primary: Sandstone

Location
- Country: Austria

The Retz Formation is a geologic formation in Austria. It preserves fossils of Metaxytherium krahuletzi, dated to the Burdigalian stage of the Miocene period.

== See also ==
- List of fossiliferous stratigraphic units in Austria
