= Blassenstein Formation =

Geologic formation in Austria

- Stratigraphic range: Jurassic
- Type: Formation

Location
- Country: Austria

The Blassenstein Formation is a geologic formation in Austria. It preserves fossils dated to the Jurassic period.

== See also ==
- List of fossiliferous stratigraphic units in Austria
