= Bombaso Formation =

Geologic formation in Austria

- Stratigraphic range: Moscovian; ~314–307 Ma
- Type: Formation
- Underlies: Meledis Formation
- Overlies: Variscan basement
- Thickness: 15 m (49 ft)

Lithology
- Primary: Limestone

Location
- Coordinates: 46.6°N 13.1°E
- Approximate paleocoordinates: 12.8°S 22.3°E
- Region: Carinthia
- Country: Austria
- Extent: Carnic Alps
- Bombaso Formation (Austria)

The Bombaso Formation, also known as Waidegger Conglomerate, Waidegger Group, Waidegg Formation or Collendiaul Formation, is a geologic formation in the Carnic Alps in southern Austria. It preserves fossils dated to the Moscovian age of the Carboniferous period.

== Fossil content ==
The following fossils have been reported from the formation:

Fusulinidae

- Protriticites ovatus
- Protriticites cf. ovoides
- Quasifusulinoides fallax
- Q. intermedius
- Q. quasifusulinoides
- Protriticites sp.

== See also ==
- List of fossiliferous stratigraphic units in Austria
