= Älterer Schlier Formation =

Geologic formation in Austria

- Stratigraphic range: Aquitanian
- Type: Formation

Location
- Coordinates: 48.2°N 14.2°E
- Approximate paleocoordinates: 48.3°N 12.1°E
- Region: Upper Austria
- Country: Austria
- Älterer Schlier Formation (Austria)

The Älterer Schlier Formation is a geologic formation in Austria. It preserves fossils dated to the Aquitanian age of the Miocene period.

== Fossil content ==
The formation has provided fossils of:

- Petralca austriaca

== See also ==
- List of fossiliferous stratigraphic units in Austria
