= Seefelder Formation =

Geologic formation in Austria

- Stratigraphic range: Triassic
- Type: Formation

Location
- Country: Austria

The Seefelder Formation (German: Seefelder Schichten) is a geologic formation in Austria. It preserves fossils dated to the Triassic period.

== See also ==
- List of fossiliferous stratigraphic units in Austria
