= Haidhof Formation =

Geologic formation in Austria

- Stratigraphic range: Lutetian
- Type: Formation

Location
- Region: Austria

The Haidhof Formation is a geologic formation in Austria. It preserves fossils dated to the Paleogene period.

== See also ==
- List of fossiliferous stratigraphic units in Austria
