= Ernstbrunn Formation =

Geologic formation in Austria and the Czech Republic

- Stratigraphic range: Tithonian
- Type: Formation
- Thickness: 99 meters

Location
- Country: Austria; Czech Republic

The Ernstbrunn Formation is a geologic formation in Austria and the Czech Republic. It preserves fossils dated to the Jurassic period.

== See also ==
- List of fossiliferous stratigraphic units in Austria
