= Paldau Formation =

Geologic formation in Austria

- Stratigraphic range: Tortonian
- Type: Formation

Lithology
- Primary: Siltstone

Location
- Coordinates: 46.9°N 15.8°E
- Approximate paleocoordinates: 46.6°N 15.6°E
- Region: Styria
- Country: Austria

Type section
- Named for: Paldau
- Paldau Formation (Austria)

The Paldau Formation is a geologic formation in Austria. It preserves insect fossils dated to the Tortonian age of the Miocene Epoch.

== Fossil content ==
The following fossils have been reported from the formation:

- Chlorocypha cordasevae
- Gyatermes styriensis
- Tipula paleopannonia

== See also ==
- List of fossiliferous stratigraphic units in Austria
