= Hallstätterkalk Formation =

Geologic formation in Germany and Slovakia

- Stratigraphic range: Triassic
- Type: Formation

Location
- Country: Germany, Slovakia

The Hallstätterkalk Formation is a geologic formation in Germany and Slovakia. It preserves fossils dating back to the Triassic period.

== See also ==
- List of fossiliferous stratigraphic units in Germany
- List of fossiliferous stratigraphic units in Slovakia
