= Skalica Formation =

Geologic formation in Austria

- Stratigraphic range: Serravallian (Sarmatian)
- Type: Formation

Lithology
- Primary: Sandstone

Location
- Country: Austria

The Skalica Formation is a geologic formation in Austria. It preserves fossils dated to the Serravallian stage (Sarmatian) of the Miocene period.

== See also ==
- List of fossiliferous stratigraphic units in Austria
