= Trogkofel Formation =

Geologic formation in Austria, Slovenia and Italy

- Stratigraphic range: Sakmarian-Artinskian; ~293–283 Ma
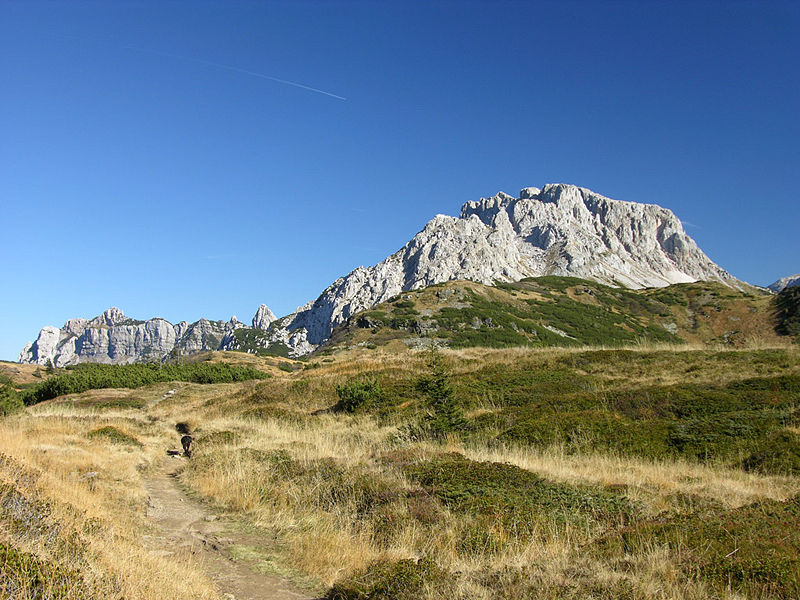
- Trogkofel, namesake of the formation
- Type: Formation

Lithology
- Primary: Limestone

Location
- Coordinates: 46.6°N 13.2°E
- Approximate paleocoordinates: 4.8°N 26.2°E
- Region: Carinthia; Friuli; Karawanks
- Country: Austria, Italy, Slovenia
- Extent: Southern Limestone Alps

Type section
- Named for: Trogkofel
- Trogkofel Formation (Austria)

The Trogkofel Formation is a geologic formation in Austria, Slovenia and Italy. It preserves fossils dating back to the Sakmarian to Artinskian stages of the Permian period.

== Fossil content ==
The following fossils were reported from the formation:

- Alternifenestella subquadratopora
- Alternifenestella tuberculifera
- Biwaella aff. americana
- Boultonia willsi
- Carnocladia fasciculata
- Eridopora ignota
- Filites trapezoida
- Neostreptognathodus cf. pequopensis
- Polypora sigillata
- Primorella serena
- Pseudofusulina ex gr. fusiformis
- Rhabdomeson hirtum
- Robustoschwagerina spatiosa
- Scacchinella gigantea
- Schubertella paramelonica
- Spirifer (Martinia) macilentus
- Stenophragmidium lamellatum
- Streblotrypa (Streblascopora) germana
- Yokoyamaella (Yokoyamaella) arminiae
- Alternifenestella sp.
- Apterinella sp.
- Dutkevitchia sp.
- Epimastopora sp.
- Eridopora sp.
- Girvanella sp.
- Goniocladia sp.
- Paraptylopora sp.
- Paratriticites sp.
- Penniretepora sp.
- Prismopora sp.
- Pseudofusulina sp.
- Rhombopora sp.
- Rugosofusulina sp.
- Staffella sp.
- Tubiphytes sp.

Flora

- Eugonophyllum johnsoni
- Shamovella obscura
- Anchicodium sp.
- Darvasites sp.
- Ivanovia sp.

== See also ==
- List of fossiliferous stratigraphic units in Austria
- List of fossiliferous stratigraphic units in Italy
- List of fossiliferous stratigraphic units in Slovenia

== Bibliography ==
- H. C. Forke. 2002. Biostratigraphic subdivision and correlation of uppermost Carboniferous/Lower Permian sediments in the southern Alps: fusulinoidean and conodont faunas from the Carnic Alps (Austria/Italy), Karavanke Mountains (Slovenia), and southern Urals (Russia). Facies 47:201-275
- A. Ernst. 2000. Permian Bryozoans of the NW-Tethys. Facies 43:79-102
- A. Ramovs. 1986. Reef building organisms and reefs in the Permian of Slovenia, NW Yugoslavia. Memorie della Societa Geologica Italiana 34:189-193
- H. L. Holzer and A. Ramovs. 1979. New rugose corals from the Lower Permian beds of the Karavanke Alps. Geologija 22(1):1-20
- E. Schellwien. 1900. Die Fauna der Trogkofelschichten in den Karnischen Alpen und den Karawanken I. Theil: die Brachiopoden. Abhandlungen der Kaiserlich-Königlichen Geologischen Reichsanstalt 16:1-122
