= Plassen Formation =

Geological formation in Austria

- Stratigraphic range: Cretaceous
- Type: Formation

Location
- Country: Austria

The Plassen Formation is a geologic formation in Austria. It preserves fossils dated to the Cretaceous period.

== See also ==
- List of fossiliferous stratigraphic units in Austria
- Memory of Mankind, using the formation to seal a long-term archive
