= Allgäu Formation =

Geologic formation in Austria

- Stratigraphic range: Hettangian-Sinemurian (Raricostatum-Obtusum); ~201–191 Ma
- Type: Formation
- Sub-units: Alpisella beds

Lithology
- Primary: Marl
- Other: Limestone

Location
- Coordinates: 47.7°N 13.7°E
- Approximate paleocoordinates: 32.5°N 19.9°E
- Region: Vorarlberg; Bavaria; Graubünden
- Country: Austria; Germany; Switzerland
- Allgäu Formation (Austria)

The Allgäu Formation is a geologic formation in Austria, Germany and Slovakia. It preserves fossils dated to the Hettangian and Sinemurian ages of the Early Jurassic Epoch, or Raricostatum to Obtusum in the regional stratigraphy. The formation was initially and formally defined by Jacobshagen (1965). The Allgäu Formation was formerly known as spotted marls (Lias-Fleckenmergel) and spotted marly limestones (Fleckenkalk). The formation is represented by dark-grey bioturbated limestones and marlstone interbeds. It represents basinal hemipelagic facies common in Alpine Tethys regions of Alps, Carpathians and other mountain ranges. Several horizons of the formation are particularly rich in ammonite fossils.

== Fossil content ==
Fish

- Agkistracanthus sp.

Ammonites

- Echioceras raricostatoides
- Epophioceras landrioti
- Leptechioceras meigeni
- Asteroceras cf. suevicum
- Juraphyllites sp.
- Paltechioceras sp.
- Villania sp.

Rhynchonellata

- Carapezzia engadinensis
- Sulcirostra doesseggeri
- Sulcirostra cf. zitteli

== See also ==
- List of fossiliferous stratigraphic units in Austria
- List of fossiliferous stratigraphic units in Germany
- List of fossiliferous stratigraphic units in Switzerland
