= Raibl Formation =

Geologic formation in Central Europe

- Stratigraphic range: Norian; 222–208 Ma
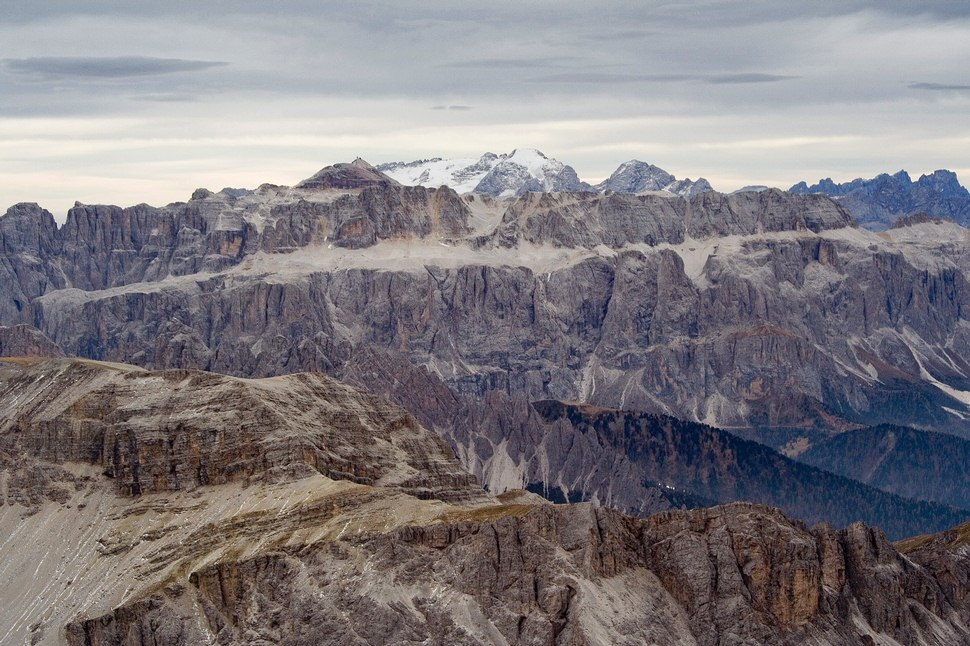
- Raibl stratum, Sella group (Pordoi), Dolomites
- Type: Geologic formation
- Underlies: Hauptdolomit Formation
- Overlies: Partnach Formation

Location
- Region: Eastern Alps; Central Europe
- Country: Austria; Italy; Slovenia

Type section
- Named for: Cave del Predil (Raibl)

The Raibl Formation is an Upper Triassic geologic formation in the Northern and Southern Limestone mountain ranges of the Eastern Alps, in Central Europe.

== Description ==
It preserves fossils dating back to the Norian Middle Triassic sub-period of the Triassic period, during the Mesozoic Era.

== See also ==
- Geology of the Alps
- List of fossiliferous stratigraphic units in Austria
- List of fossiliferous stratigraphic units in Italy
- List of fossiliferous stratigraphic units in Slovenia
