= Werfen Formation =

Geologic formation in Austria, Bosnia and Herzegovina, and Italy

- Stratigraphic range: Changhsingian-Ladinian; ~254–235 Ma
- Type: Formation
- Unit of: Costabella Group
- Sub-units: Campil, Cencenighe, Gastropod Oolite, Tesero Oolite, Mazzin, Siusi, Val Badia Members

Lithology
- Primary: Mudstone, lime mudstone, limestone
- Other: Siltstone, sandstone, marl

Location
- Coordinates: 46.8°N 12.1°E
- Approximate paleocoordinates: 7.4°N 22.9°E
- Region: Upper Austria, Bolzano, South Tyrol, Trentino, Veneto
- Country: Austria; Italy; Bosnia and Herzegovina
- Extent: Dinaric, Southern Limestone & Salzburg Slate Alps, Tennen Mountains

Type section
- Named for: Werfen
- Werfen Formation (Mediterranean)

The Werfen Formation is a geologic formation in the Southern Limestone Alps and Dinaric Alps of Austria, Bosnia and Herzegovina, and Italy. It preserves fossils dating back to the Triassic period.

== Fossil content ==
The formation has provided numerous fossils typical of a shallow lagoon environment, including:

- Eotiaris teseroensis (a crown-group echinoid from Changhsingian aged beds of the Tesero Member)
- Orbicoelia sp. (a brachiopod)
- Teserina nerii (a brachiopod)

Griesbachian aged layers of the formation also preserve an unexpectedly diverse ichnotaxon assemblage, including the ichnogenera Catenichnus, Helminthopsis, Lockeia, Palaeophycus, Planolites, Rhizocorallium, Spongeliomorpha, Taenidium and Thalassinoides.

== See also ==
- List of fossiliferous stratigraphic units in Austria
- List of fossiliferous stratigraphic units in Bosnia and Herzegovina
- List of fossiliferous stratigraphic units in Italy
