= Ramsau Dolomite =

Geologic formation in Germany

- Stratigraphic range: Carnian; ~235–222 Ma
- Type: Geologic formation
- Unit of: Wetterstein Formation

Lithology
- Primary: Dolomite

Location
- Coordinates: 47.7°N 12.9°E
- Approximate paleocoordinates: 13.9°N 20.9°E
- Region: Bavaria, Styria
- Country: Germany and Austria
- Extent: Northern Limestone Alps
- Ramsau Dolomite (Germany) Ramsau Dolomite (Bavaria)

The Ramsau Dolomite is a dolomitic geologic formation in the Northern Limestone Alps, of Austria and of Bavaria, Germany. It is a unit of the Wetterstein Limestone found in the Limestone Alps. It preserves fossils dating back to the Carnian stage of the Triassic period.

== Fossil content ==
The formation has provided fossils of:

Bivalves

- Cornucardia hornigii
- Daonella (Arzelella) indica
- Katosira bavarica
- Neomegalodon (Rossiodus) stoppanii

Gastropods

- Omphaloptycha rosthorni
- ?Coelostylina sp.

== See also ==
- List of fossiliferous stratigraphic units in Germany
