= Schlern Formation =

Geological formation in Austria and Italy

- Stratigraphic range: late Anisian-mid Ladinian; ~242–239 Ma
- Type: Geologic formation
- Underlies: Cassian Dolomite
- Overlies: Contrin Formation

Lithology
- Primary: Dolomite
- Other: Limestone, marl

Location
- Coordinates: 46.6°N 13.3°E
- Approximate paleocoordinates: 6.8°N 23.5°E
- Region: Kärnten; South Tyrol
- Country: Austria, Italy
- Extent: Southern Limestone Alps
- Schlern Formation (Austria)

The Schlern Formation, also known as Schlern Dolomite, and Sciliar Formation or Sciliar Dolomite in Italy, is a limestone, marl and dolomite formation in the Southern Limestone Alps in Kärnten, Austria and South Tyrol, Italy.

== Description ==
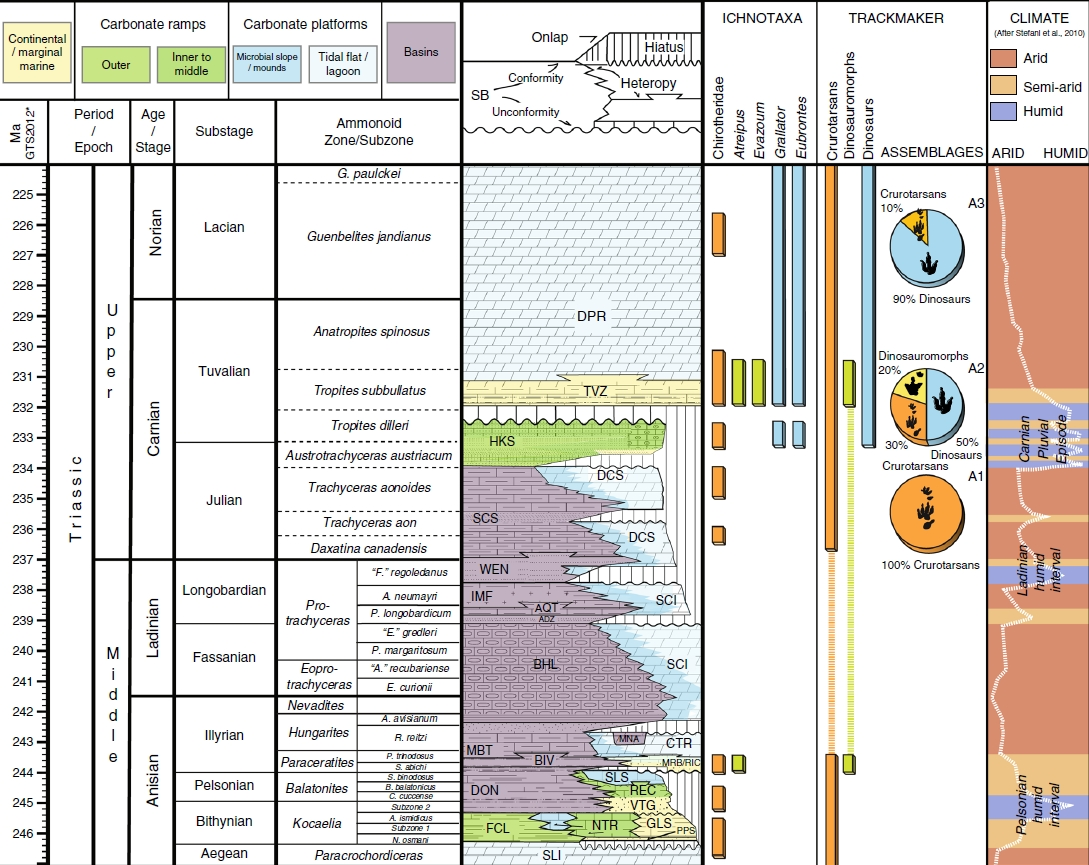
Stratigraphy of the Dolomites

It preserves fossils dating back to the Middle Triassic period (late Anisian-middle Ladinian), or Illyrian to Longobardian in the regional stratigraphy. The formation correlates with the Wetterstein Formation of the Northern Limestone Alps. The formation is also coeval with the Livinallongo or Buchenstein Formation. The Schlern Formation is unconformably overlain by the Cassian Dolomite, and overlies the Contrin Formation separated by another unconformity. Deposition of the formation took place between the Pelsonian Humid Interval and the Ladinian Humid Interval, that preceded the better known Carnian Pluvial Event (CPE).

In Italy, the unit is recognized in the Civetta and Latemar reef buildups, and in Austria at the Gartnerkofel.

== Fossil content ==
Among others, the following fossils have been described from the Schlern Formation:

Bivalves

- Daonella esinensis

Gastropods

- Cassianopsis decussata
- Coelostylina conica
- Fedaiella neritacea
- Hologyra alpina
- H. elevata
- Hologyra (Vernelia) dissimilis
- Loxonema aequale
- Neritaria plicatilis
- Palaeonarica concentrica
- Promathildia pygmaea
- Pustulifer alpina
- Tyrsoecus (Stephanocosmia)
- Zygopleura spinosa

== See also ==
- List of fossiliferous stratigraphic units in Austria
- List of fossiliferous stratigraphic units in Italy
- Bletterbach
