= Schrambach Formation =

Geologic formation in Austria and Germany

- Stratigraphic range: Berriasian-Barremian
- Type: Formation

Lithology
- Primary: Limestone
- Other: Marl

Location
- Coordinates: 47.9°N 14.4°E
- Approximate paleocoordinates: 31.0°N 23.1°E
- Region: Ternberg; Bavaria
- Country: Austria, Germany
- Extent: Northern Limestone Alps

Type section
- Named for: Schrambach
- Schrambach Formation (Austria)

The Schrambach Formation is a geologic formation in the Northern Limestone Alps of Austria and Germany. It preserves fossils dating back to the Early Cretaceous period.

== See also ==
- List of fossiliferous stratigraphic units in Austria
- List of fossiliferous stratigraphic units in Germany
