= Garschella Formation =

Geologic formation in Austria, Germany, France, and Switzerland

- Stratigraphic range: early Aptian-early Cenomanian
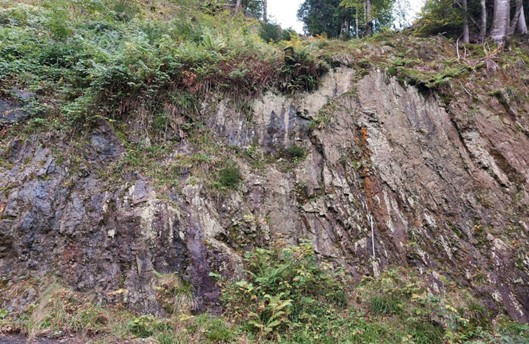
- Type: Formation
- Underlies: Seewen Formation
- Overlies: Schrattenkalk Formation
- Thickness: up to 120 m (390 ft)

Lithology
- Primary: Limestone
- Other: Sandstone

Location
- Region: Alps
- Country: Austria; Germany; France; Switzerland

Type section
- Named for: Garschella Plateau
- Named by: Föllmi & Ouwehand
- Year defined: 1987

The Garschella Formation is an early Aptian to early Cenomanian geologic formation in the Alps of Austria, France, Germany and Switzerland. It preserves fossils dated to the Cretaceous period.

== Description ==
The Garschella Formation consists of glauconite- and apatite-bearing sandstones, limestones, marls and phosphorite layers.The Garschella Formation varies in thickness and can be up to 120 m thick. The rocks of the Garschella Formation can be bedded, often they are overgrown with moss and weather angularly. The bedding is often heavily fissured, with the fissures being almost perpendicular to the stratification.

== Formation ==
The change from the Schrattenkalk Formation to the Garschella Formation was caused by a transgressive phase in which the carbonate production was severely restricted by the changing ocean currents.

== See also ==
- List of fossiliferous stratigraphic units in Austria
- List of fossiliferous stratigraphic units in France
- List of fossiliferous stratigraphic units in Germany
- List of fossiliferous stratigraphic units in Switzerland
