= Partnach Formation =

Geological formation in Austria

- Stratigraphic range: Ladinian (Longobardian); ~242–235 Ma
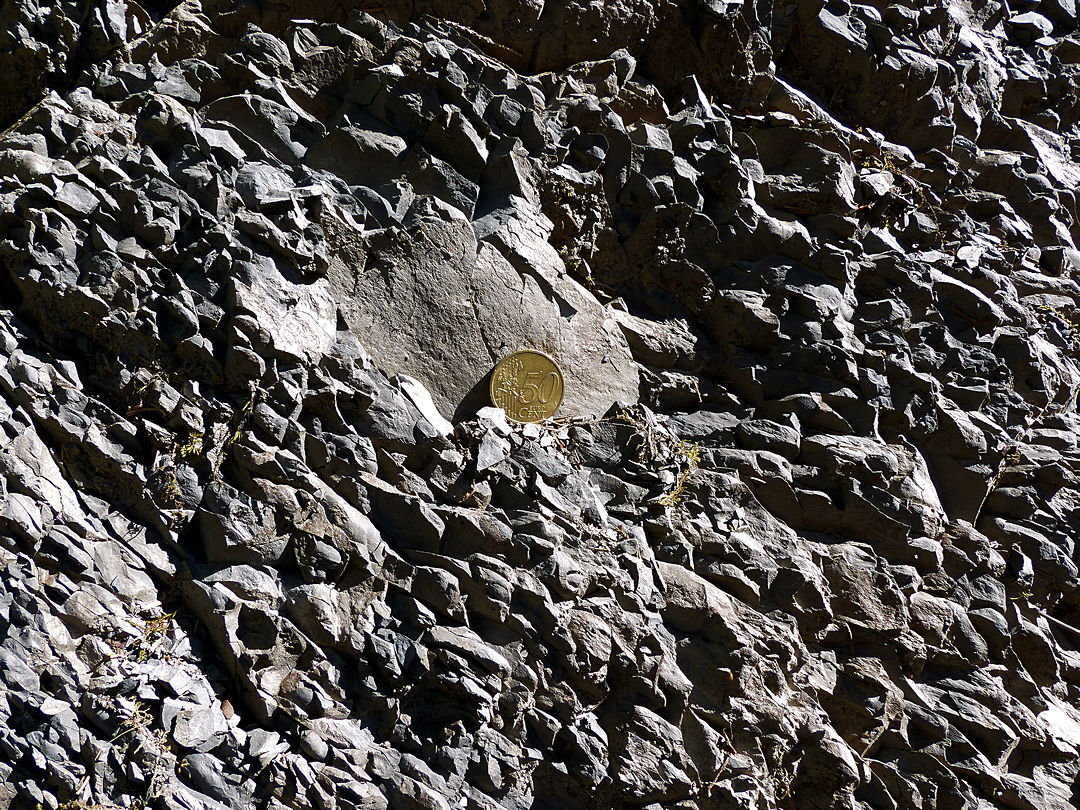
- Outcrop of Partnach marl west of the Partnach Gorge
- Type: Geologic formation
- Underlies: Wetterstein Formation
- Overlies: Reifling Formation

Lithology
- Primary: Clayey shales (marls) and limestone

Location
- Coordinates: 47.1°N 9.9°E
- Approximate paleocoordinates: 8.6°N 21.9°E
- Region: Carinthia, Vorarlberg
- Country: Austria; Slovakia
- Extent: Northern Limestone Alps

Type section
- Named for: Partnach
- Named by: Wilhelm von Gümbel
- Partnach Formation (Austria)

The Partnach Formation is a Middle Triassic geologic formation in the eastern Northern Limestone Alps and Western Carpathians, within Austria and Slovakia, Central Europe. The formation consists of alternating grey and green marls and shales (Partnach shales) and grey limestones (Partnach Limestone), often brecciated, oncolithic and containing clay intraclasts. The formation is gradually evolving from the Reifling Formation. It is usually overlain by the Lunz/Reibl Formation or Wetterstein Formation. Sediments of the Partnach Formation were deposited in intrashelf basins.

The rock unit was originally defined as Partnachschichten by Wilhelm von Gümbel in 1858.

It preserves fossils dated to the Ladinian age of the Middle Triassic Epoch of the Triassic Period.

== Fossil content ==
- Sauropterygia
  - Lariosaurus cf. balsami
  - Neusticosaurus toeplitschi
  - Microleptosaurus schlosseri
  - Simosaurus gaillardoti
- Temnospondyls
  - Tatrasuchus sp.

== See also ==
- List of fossiliferous stratigraphic units in Austria
