= Steinalm Formation =

Geologic formation

- Stratigraphic range: Triassic Period, Mesozoic Era
- Type: Geologic formation
- Unit of: Wetterstein limestone

Location
- Region: Northern Limestone Alps
- Country: Austria

The Steinalm Formation is a geologic formation in the Northern Limestone Alps, in Austria.

It is a sub−unit of the Wetterstein limestone formation, found in the Limestone Alps.

It preserves fossils dated to the Triassic period of the Mesozoic Era.

== See also ==
- List of fossiliferous stratigraphic units in Austria
