= Limnopus =

Limnopus Temporal range: Moscovian–Asselian

Trace fossil classification
- Kingdom: Animalia
- Phylum: Chordata
- Clade: Tetrapoda
- Order: †Temnospondyli
- Family: †Eryopidae
- Ichnogenus: †Limnopus; Marsh, 1894

Type ichnospecies
- †Limnopus vagus Marsh, 1894

Trace fossil

Limnopus is an ichnogenus of ancient tetrapod footprint. Its footprints have been found in Moscovian aged-rocks situated in Alveley, Shropshire, England, Colorado and West Virginia.

According to Milan et al. (2016) the diagnostic characters Limnopus are: Track-ways of a quadrupedal tetrapod with plantigrade to semiplantigrade imprints, pace angulation 80°–96°, stride : pes length = 3–5.5 : 1; pes impressed closely behind manus, pentadactyl, digits increasing in length from I–IV, digit IV longest, digit V as long as digit II and occasionally missing, short and broad oval sole, in deeply impressed imprints with proximolateral ‘heel’, robust basal pad of digit I, distal ends of digits rounded; manus tetradactyl with short broad, distally rounded digits, digits increasing in length from I–III, digit III longest, digit IV slightly shorter (80–90% of digit III), mostly longer than digit II, digit I with deeply impressed proximal pad similar to that in the pes.

The lack of claws and scales suggest that these footprints were made by large amphibians, being often attributed to eryopid temnospondyls. The lack of belly and tail marks in the sediment indicates that the producer raised most of its body when walking and had a short or non-dragging tail. This suggests that an Eryops-like animal could have made these tracks.

The Limnopus glenshawensis type specimen was accompanied by tracks of that of the related Ichniotherium. The type specimen of Limnopus and Ichniotherium is currently housed in the Lapworth Museum of Geology in Birmingham, England. A 3D printed model of an Ichnotherium track can also be seen.

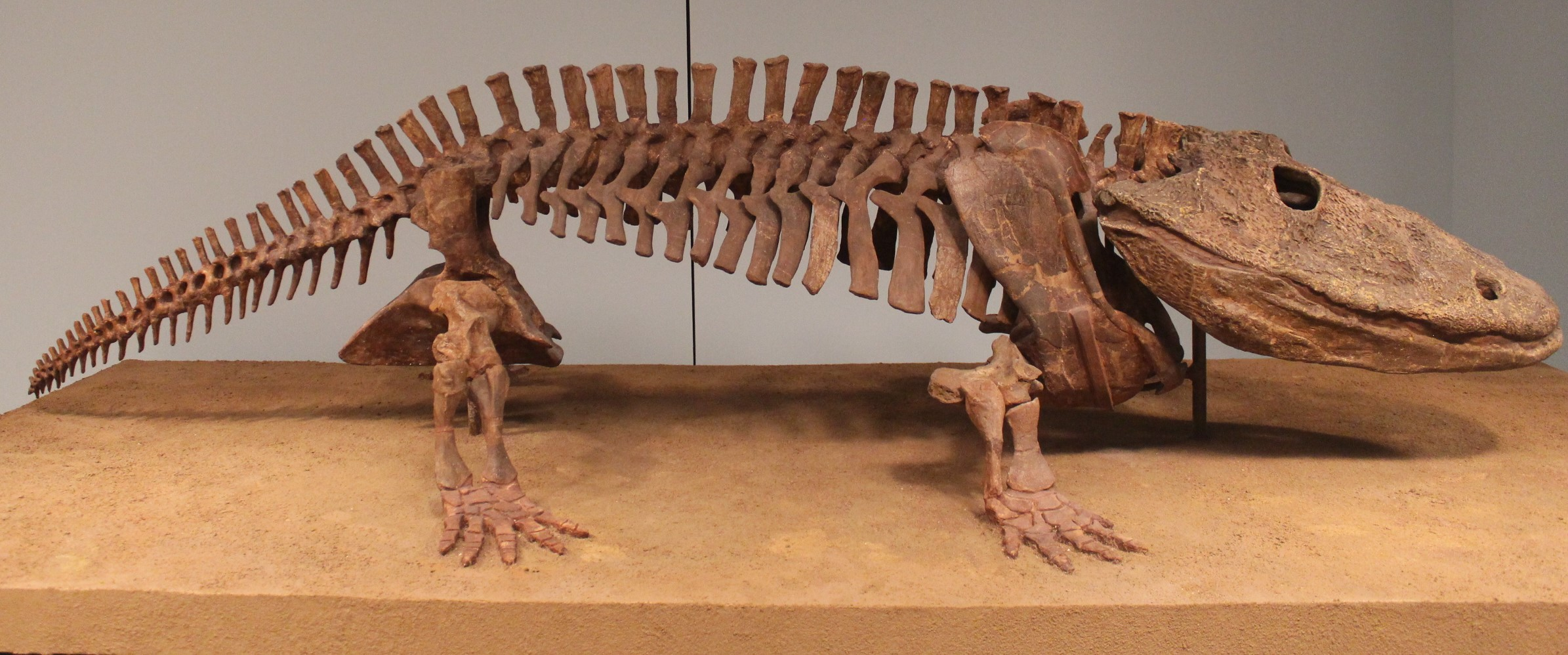
With its lack of claws, upright posture and short tail, Eryops is a likely candidate to be the producer of the Limnopus tracks .
