= Montemarcello Formation =

Geologic formation in Liguria, Italy

- Stratigraphic range: Carnian; ~237–228 Ma
- Type: Geological formation

Lithology
- Primary: Sandstone
- Other: Claystone

Location
- Coordinates: 44.1°N 9.9°E
- Approximate paleocoordinates: 15.2°N 18.3°E
- Region: Liguria
- Country: Italy

Type section
- Named for: Montemarcello
- Montemarcello Formation (Italy)

The Montemarcello Formation is a Late Triassic (Carnian) geologic formation in Liguria, Italy. Fossil prosauropod tracks have been reported from the formation.

== Description ==
The formation comprises arenites with a few thin clayey inter-beds. The sands overlie micro-conglomeratic bodies up to 1 metre (3.3 ft) thick. Two-dimensional ripple marks (with wavelengths of nearly 20 centimetres (7.9 in)), larger ripples (wavelengths of 120 centimetres (47 in)), interference ripples, and mud cracks were recognized. The arenitic beds are also characterized by internal structures such as accretionary laminae, coalescent bodies, low-angle lamination, and cross stratification. Some arenitic levels are deeply bioturbated, both by simple vertical tubes and by larger horizontal ones. Rare small wood fragments were recognized. Small channels, up to 1.5 metres (4.9 ft) over a very short distance, cut the arenitic bodies.

== Fossil content ==
The following fossils were reported from the formation:

- Evazoum sirigui
- Anomoepus sp.
- Eosauropus sp.
- Grallator (Eubrontes)
- Chirotheriidae indet.

== See also ==
- List of dinosaur-bearing rock formations
  - List of stratigraphic units with sauropodomorph tracks
    - Prosauropod tracks
- List of fossiliferous stratigraphic units in Italy
