= Melk Formation =

Geologic formation in Austria

- Stratigraphic range: Chattian-Aquitanian; ~27.84–20.44 Ma
- Type: Formation

Lithology
- Primary: Sandstone

Location
- Country: Austria

The Melk Formation is a geologic formation in Austria. It preserves fossils dated to the Paleogene and the Neogene periods.

== See also ==
- List of fossiliferous stratigraphic units in Austria
