= Slatnik Formation =

Geologic formation in Slovenia

The Slatnik Formation (pronounced [ˈslaːtnik]; Slovene: Slatniška formacija) is a stratigraphic unit in Slovenia. It was named after and defined near Mount Slatnik. The formation is defined as an alternating succession of hemipelagic limestone and resedimented limestone. It was deposited between the Upper Norian and the end of the Rhaetian.

The Slatnik Formation can be found in the Kobla Nappe and the Tolmin Nappe. It is underlain by the Bača Formation and overlain by the Krikov Formation.

The best outcrops of the formation are exposed at Mount Slatnik and Mount Kobla.
