= Meledis Formation =

Australian geological formation

- Stratigraphic range: Carboniferous
- Type: Formation

Location
- Country: Austria

The Meledis Formation is a geologic formation in Austria. It preserves fossils dated to the Carboniferous period.

== See also ==
- List of fossiliferous stratigraphic units in Austria
