= Wetterstein Formation =

Regional geologic formation in the Northern Limestone Alps and Western Carpathians

- Stratigraphic range: Ladinian-Carnian; ~237–224 Ma
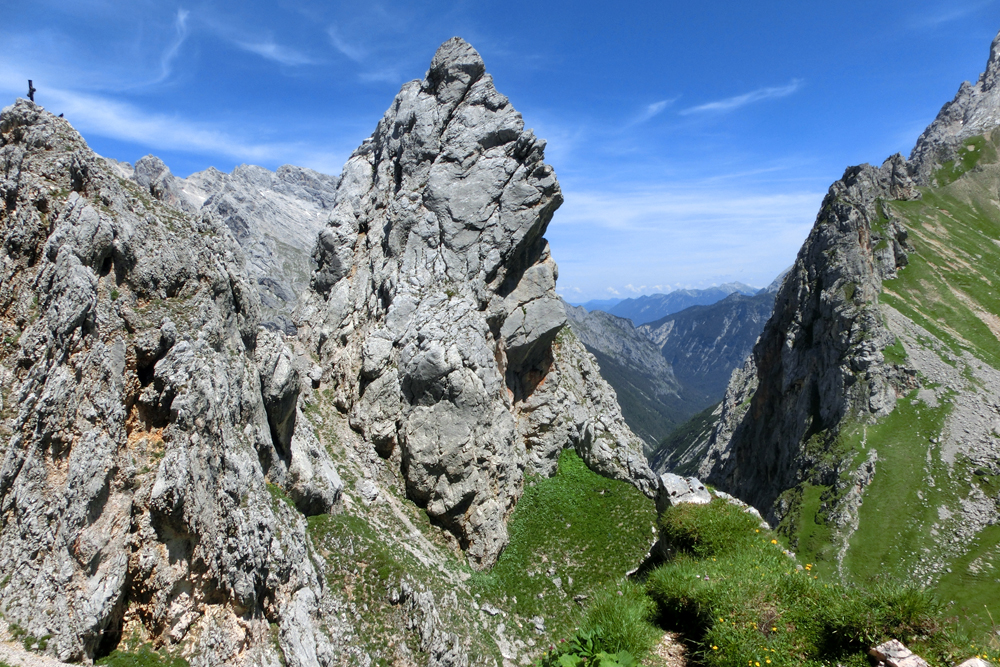
- The formation in the Wetterstein near Gatterl
- Type: Geological formation
- Sub-units: See text
- Underlies: See text
- Overlies: See text
- Thickness: up to 1,000 m (3,300 ft)

Lithology
- Primary: Limestone, dolomite

Location
- Coordinates: 47.4°N 11°E
- Region: Alps, Central Europe
- Country: Austria, Germany, Hungary, Slovakia
- Extent: Northern Limestone Alps, Western Carpathians

Type section
- Named for: Wetterstein Mountains
- Named by: Von Gümbel
- Year defined: 1861
- Coordinates: 45°N 20°W
- Approximate paleocoordinates: 4°N 4°W

Wetterstein limestone
- Stratigraphic range: Middle—Late Triassic; Ladinian–Carnian
- Type: Geological formation
- Thickness: 600 m

Lithology
- Primary: Limestone

Location
- Region: Alps, Central Europe
- Country: Austria, Germany, Switzerland

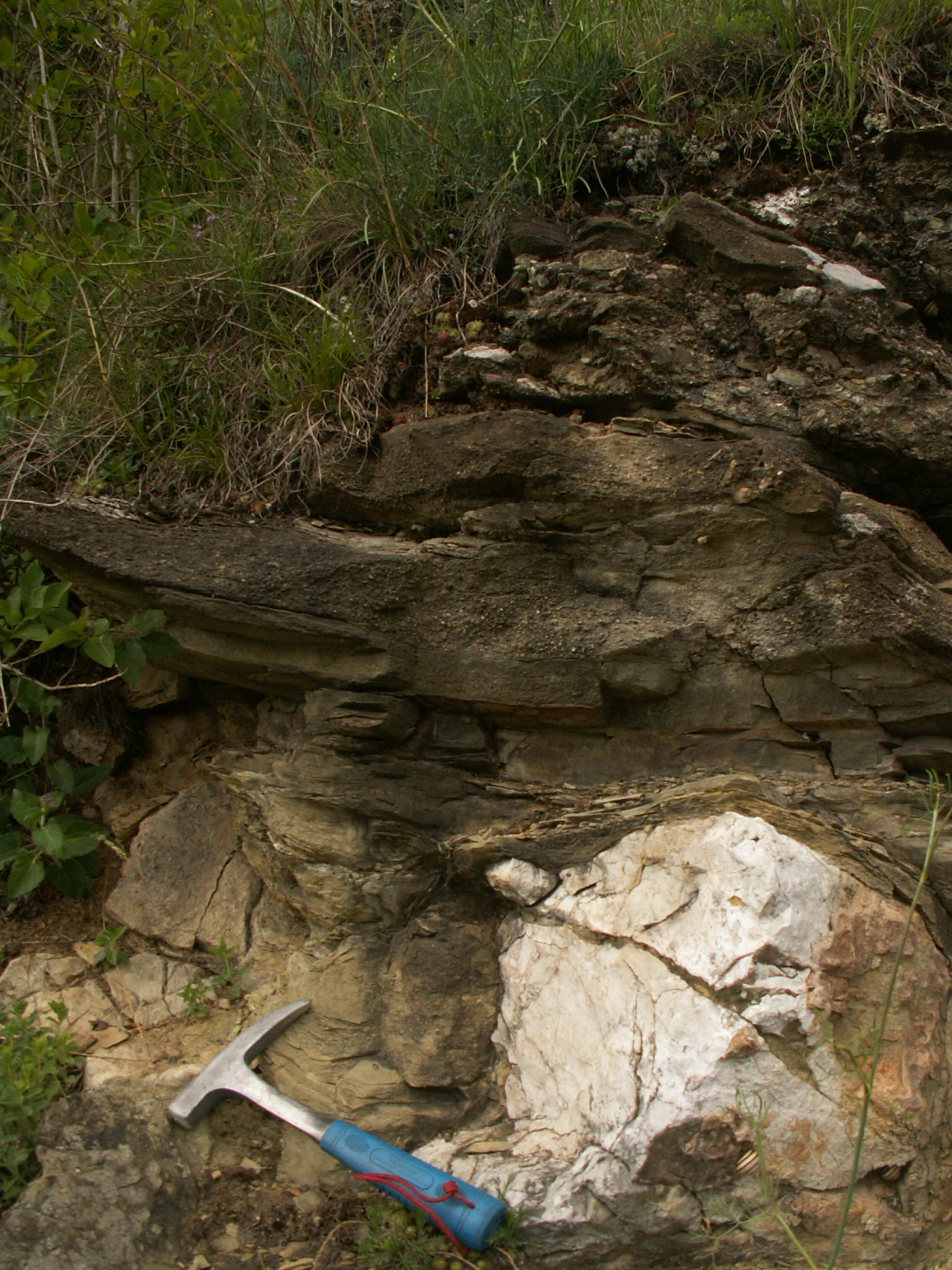
Transgression of the Paleogene sediments over the Wetterstein Limestone of the Silicic Superunit, Western Carpathians.

The Wetterstein Formation is a regional geologic formation of the Northern Limestone Alps and Western Carpathians extending from southern Bavaria, Germany in the west, through northern Austria to northern Hungary and western Slovakia in the east. The formation dates back to the Ladinian to Carnian stages of the Late Triassic. The formation is named after the Wetterstein Mountains in southern Germany and northwestern Austria. The center of its distribution is in the Karwendel Mountains. It occurs in the Northern and Southern Limestone Alps and in the Western Carpathians.

The formation is composed of mostly reefal limestones and dolomites, the latter the result of widespread diagenesis. In many areas there is a frequent alternation of limestone and dolomite facies. Local variants to indicate the Wetterstein Formation include German: Wettersteinkalk (Wetterstein Limestone), Wettersteindolomit ("Wetterstein Dolomite") and combinations thereof. The Wetterstein Formation reaches a maximum thickness of 1,000 metres (3,300 ft) with major regional thickness variations. It forms part of the Austroalpine nappe tectonostratigraphic unit. The carbonate rock of the formation is from the Middle Triassic epoch of the Ladinian stage, comparable to the German stage in which Muschelkalk rock strata were formed.

The formation has provided numerous fossils of corals, sponges, bivalves, gastropods and other marine groups indicative of a shallow marine carbonate platform environment deposited at the northern end of the Tethys Ocean.

== Naming ==
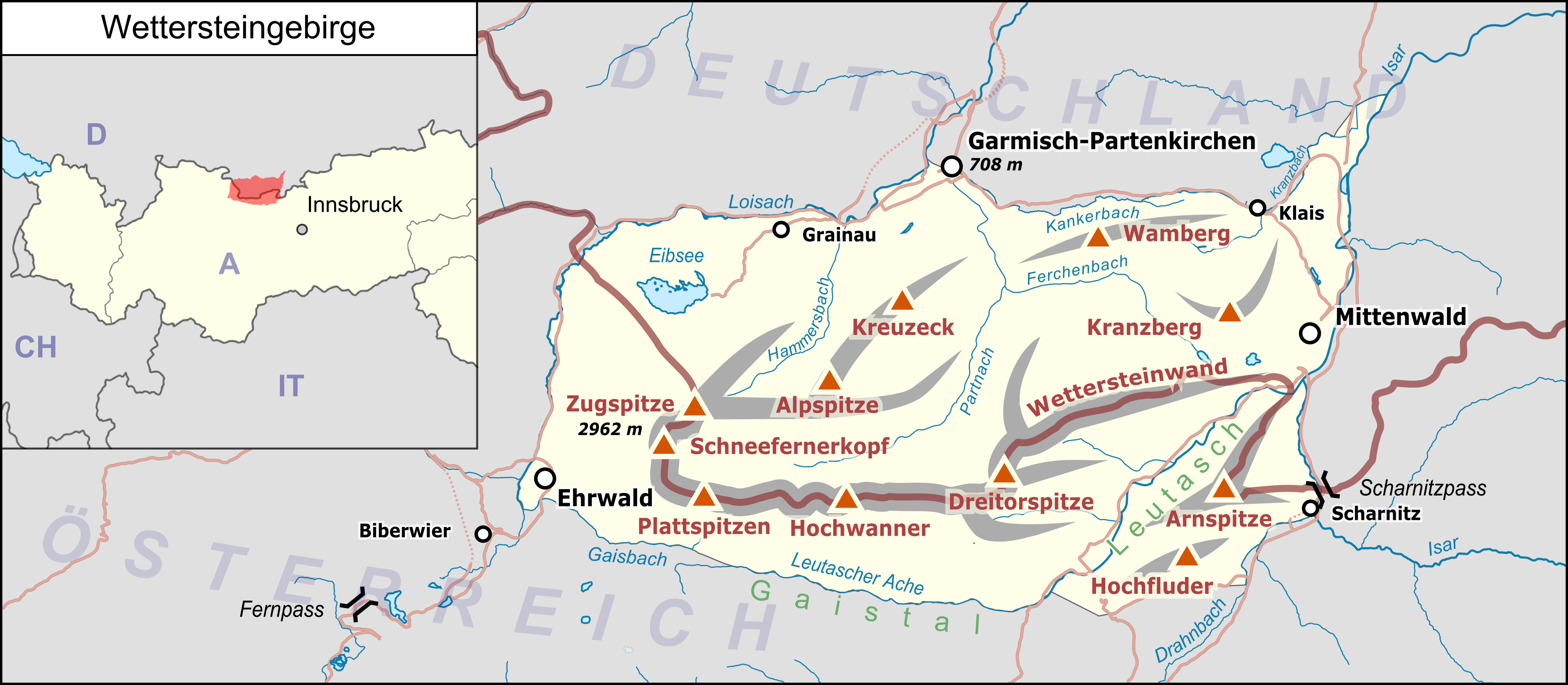
Map of the Wetterstein

The Wetterstein Formation is named after the Wetterstein Mountains in southern Germany and northwestern Austria.

Alternative names for the whole formation or parts of it in stratigraphical (vertical) or facies (lateral) sense are:

- Wetterstein Limestone (Wettersteinkalk)
- Wettersteinkalk Formation
- Wettersteindolomit - used in Semmering and Kalkkögel, Austria
- Wetterstein Limestone Formation
- Wetterstein kalk/dolomit - used in the Northern Limestone Alps of Austria
- Wetterstein reef limestone Formation

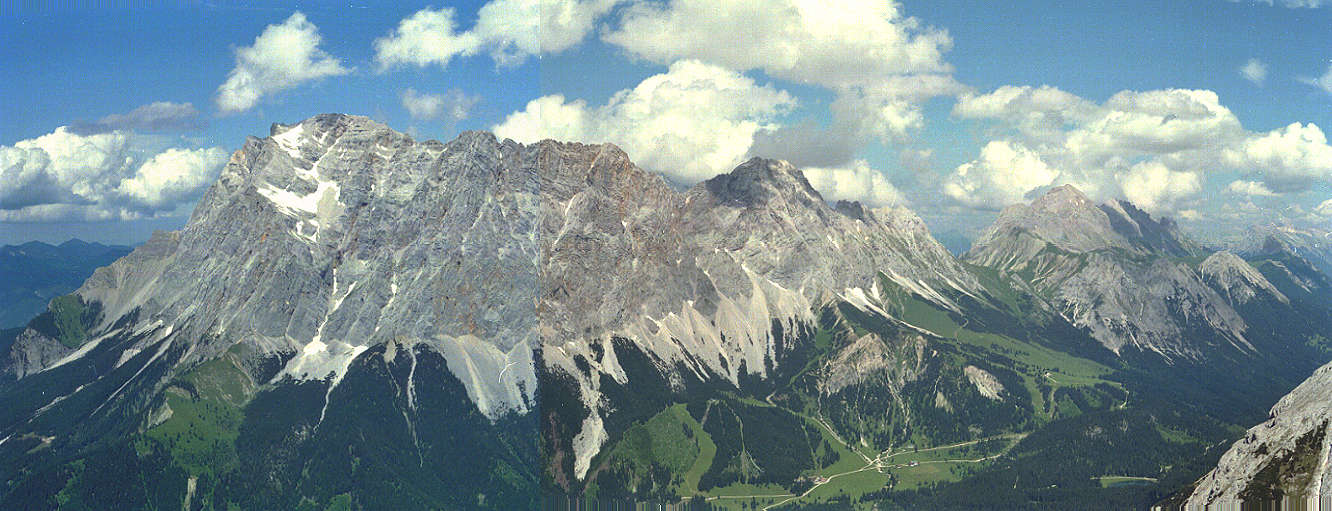
View of the Wetterstein

The Swiss stratigraphical lexicon uses Wetterstein Formation as "informal, but used name" with the following historical variants:

- Wettersteinkalk (von Guembel 1861, Fraas 1910)
- Wettersteinkalk = Ladinische Stufe (Cornelius 1935)
- Wetterstein = Wettersteindolomit = Wettersteinkomplex (Stöcklin 1949) (Fellerer 1964, Kraus 1964)
- Calcaire de Wetterstein [sic] = Calcaire du Wetterstein = Formation de Wetterstein [sic] (Hirsch 1966)
- Wettersteindolomit, Wetterstein-Dolomit

=== Subunits ===
Its subunits include:

- Messerstich Limestone
- Schlern Dolomite
- Marmolata Limestone
- Steinalm Formation
- Ramsau Dolomite Formation

== Description ==
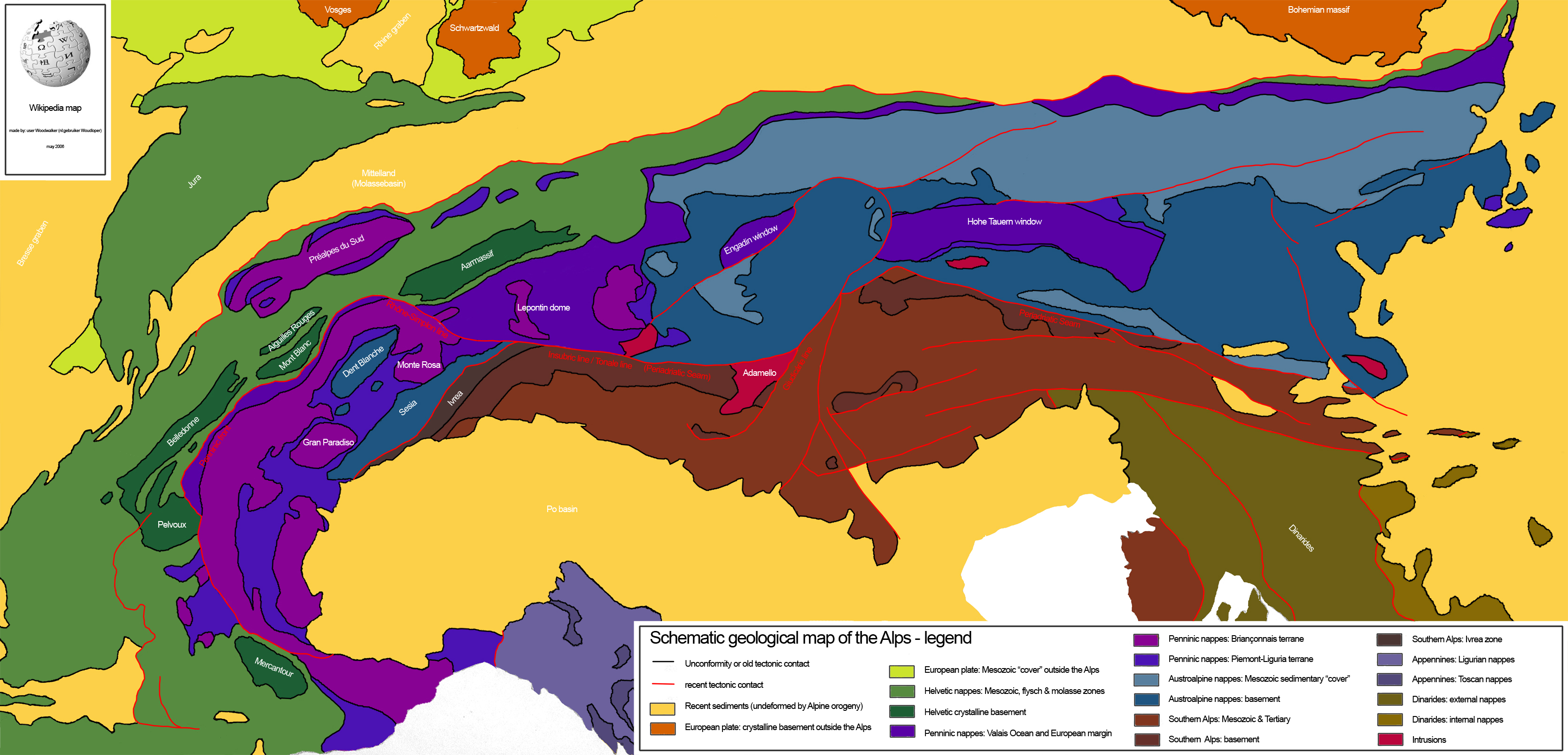
The Wetterstein Formation crops out in the light-grey blue parts of this map, mostly in Austria, with other outcrops in Germany, Hungary and Slovakia

The Wetterstein Formation, with a total thickness of up to 1,000 metres (3,300 ft), is a major regional stratigraphic unit of the Northern Limestone Alps and Western Carpathians in Central Europe, spanning across four countries from southwestern Bavaria to northwestern Slovakia.

=== Extent ===
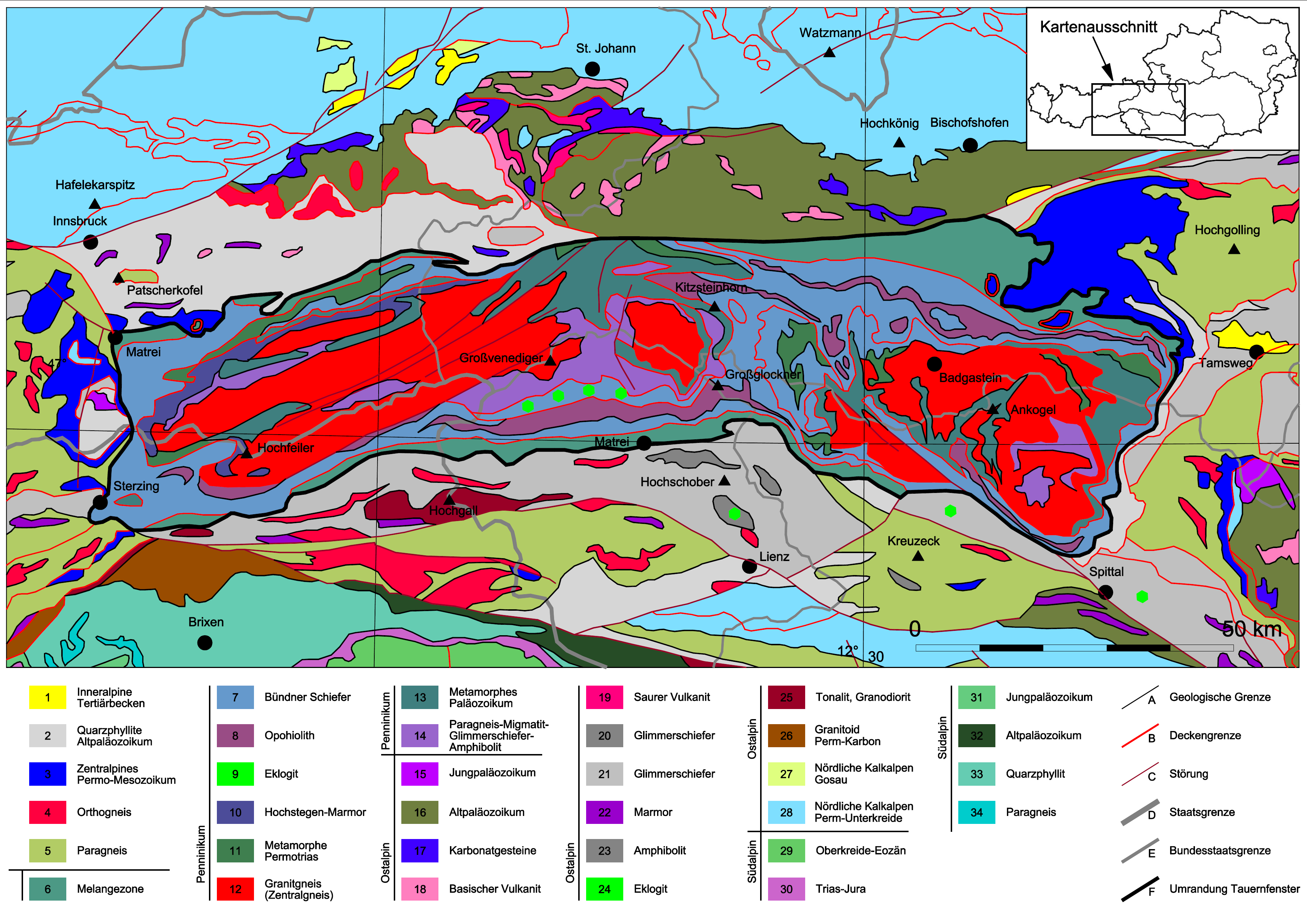
The Tauern Window in the Alps with the Northern Limestone Alps in cyan

The formation crops out to the north of the Hohe Tauern window and is part of the Austroalpine nappes.

=== Stratigraphy ===
In the Semmering area of Austria, where the name Wettersteindolomit is used, the formation is unconformably overlain by the Kapellener Shale and overlies the Reifling Formation, in the Kalkkögel and Radstadt Tauern the dolomite overlies the Partnach Formation and is overlain by the Raibl Formation, while in Tyrol the formation, called Wettersteinkalk/dolomit unconformably overlies the Gutenstein and Steinalm Formations and unconformably underlies the Reingraben Formation.

In the Aggtelek-Rudabánya mountains of Hungary, the formation, called Wetterstein Limestone Formation overlies the Reifling and Steinalm Formations and is overlain by the Szádvárborsa Formation.

=== Regional correlations ===
In Austria the Wetterstein Dolomite correlates with the Alberg Formation of the Linz Dolomites, the Wetterstein kalk/dolomite with the lower part of the Hallstatt Formation of the Northern Limestone Alps and with the Schlern Dolomite, or Schlern Formation, in the Southern Limestone Alps.

In Hungary, the formation is time-equivalent with the Berva Formation of the Bükk, the Bódvavölgyi Ophiolite, Szentjánoshegy and Derenk Formations of the Aggtelek-Rudabánya range and the Csanádapáca Formation of the Békés Zone. In the Dinarides, the formation is time-equivalent with the Grivska Formation of Bosnia. The Kopaonik Formation in its eponymous mountain range in Serbia is considered a distal, more deep water equivalent of the Wetterstein platform sediments.

=== Diagenesis ===
Dolomitization of the Wetterstein Carbonate Platform is a widespread phenomenon, especially in the Tirolic units of the Northern Calcareous Alps. At the Clessinsperre, the type locality for the underlying Steinalm Formation, intense dolomitization has altered the microfacies characteristics of the Wetterstein Carbonate platform – typical are fore-reef carbonates, later reefal and back-reefal carbonates topped by lagoonal carbonates, making the original features hardly visible.

== Fossil content ==
Because, during dolomitisation, traces of fossils are largely lost as a result of recrystallisation, fossils in the Wetterstein dolomite are harder to distinguish, and even in thin sections may be barely recognizable. Wetterstein dolomite is rarely as bituminous as typical Main Dolomite and therefore tends to be much more pure and brighter-coloured. Otherwise, there are no fundamental differences with the Wetterstein limestone.

Among others, the following fossils have been described from the Wetterstein Formation:

Group	Unit	Fossils	Notes
Sponges	Wettersteinkalk, Austria	Alpinothalamia bavarica, Follicatena cautica, Colospongia catenulata, Cryptocoelia zitteli, Solenolmia magna, Uvanella irregularis, Vesicocaulis alpinus, V. depressus, V. oenipontanus	
Sponges	Wetterstein reef limestone, Hungary	Paravesicocaulis concentricus, Senowbaridaryana triassicus, Vesicocaulis multisiphonatus	
Brachiopods	Wettersteinkalk, Austria	Stolzenburgiella baloghi	
Corals			
Gastropods			
Bivalves			

== See also ==
- Geology of the Alps
- Schrattenkalk Formation
- Hauptdolomit Formation
- List of types of limestone
- Triassic System of Europe
- Ansbachersandstein, contemporaneous ichnofossiliferous formation of Bavaria
- Benkersandstein, contemporaneous ichnofossiliferous formation of Bavaria
- Chañares Formation, fossiliferous formation of the Ischigualasto-Villa Unión Basin, Argentina
- Candelária Formation, contemporaneous fossiliferous formation of the Paraná Basin, Brazil
- Molteno Formation, contemporaneous fossiliferous formation of Lesotho and South Africa
- Pebbly Arkose Formation, contemporaneous fossiliferous formation of Botswana, Zambia and Zimbabwe
- Denmark Hill Insect Bed, contemporaneous fossiliferous unit of Queensland, Australia
- Madygen Formation, contemporaneous Lagerstätte of Kyrgyzstan
