= Main Dolomite =

Rock formation in the Alps of Europe

Main Dolomite Hauptdolomit Fődolomit Dolomia Principale
- Stratigraphic range: Carnian-Norian
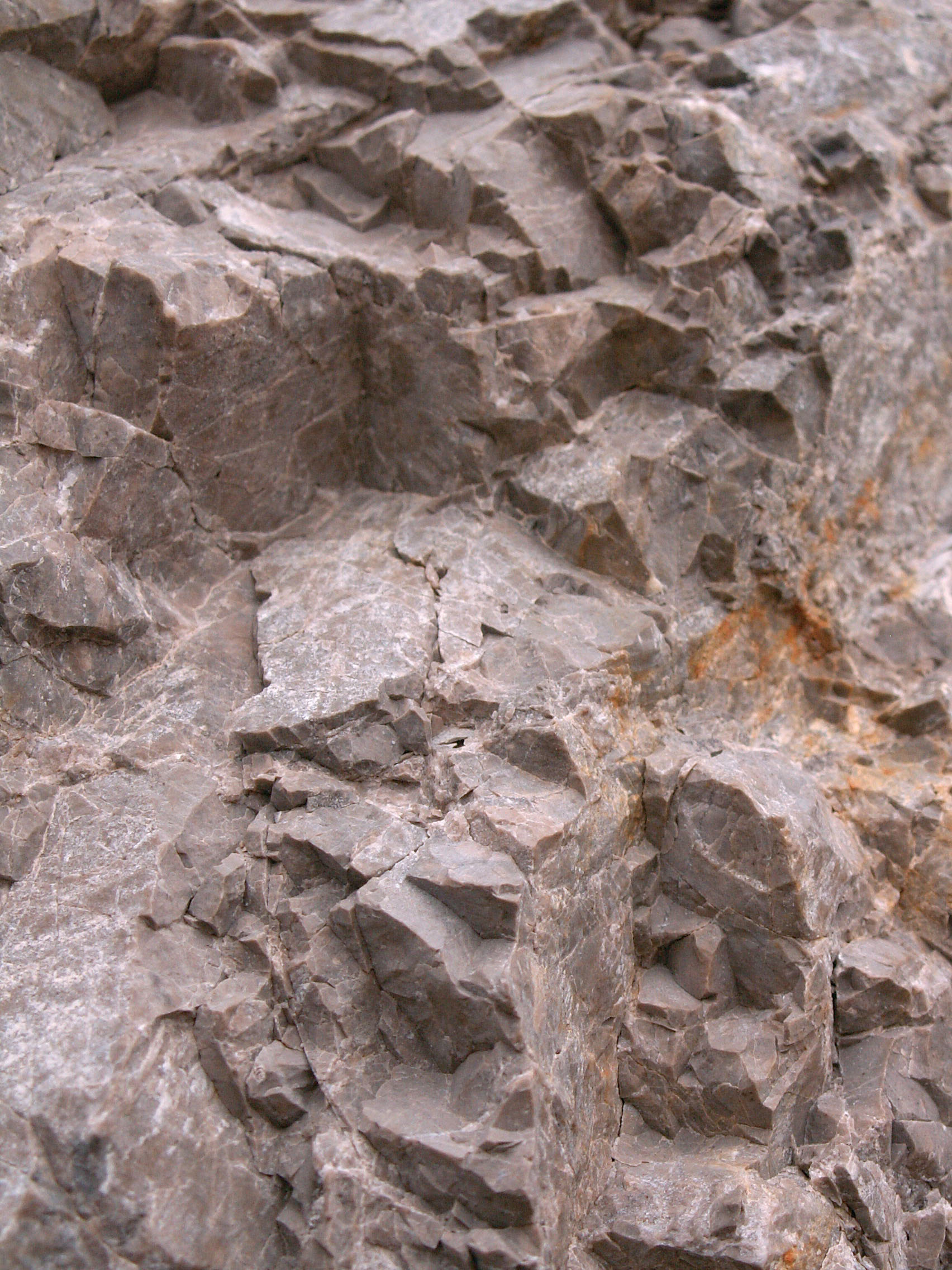
- Typical grey Main dolomite (Hauptdolomit) from rock quarry near Hradište pod Vrátnom, Slovakia
- Type: Geological formation
- Thickness: 0–2,200 m (0–7,218 ft)

Lithology
- Primary: Dolomite
- Other: Limestone

Location
- Region: Limestone Alps & Apennines; Central Europe
- Country: Austria; Germany; Hungary; Italy; Slovakia

Type section
- Named for: "Main Dolomite"
- Named by: Gümbel
- Year defined: 1857

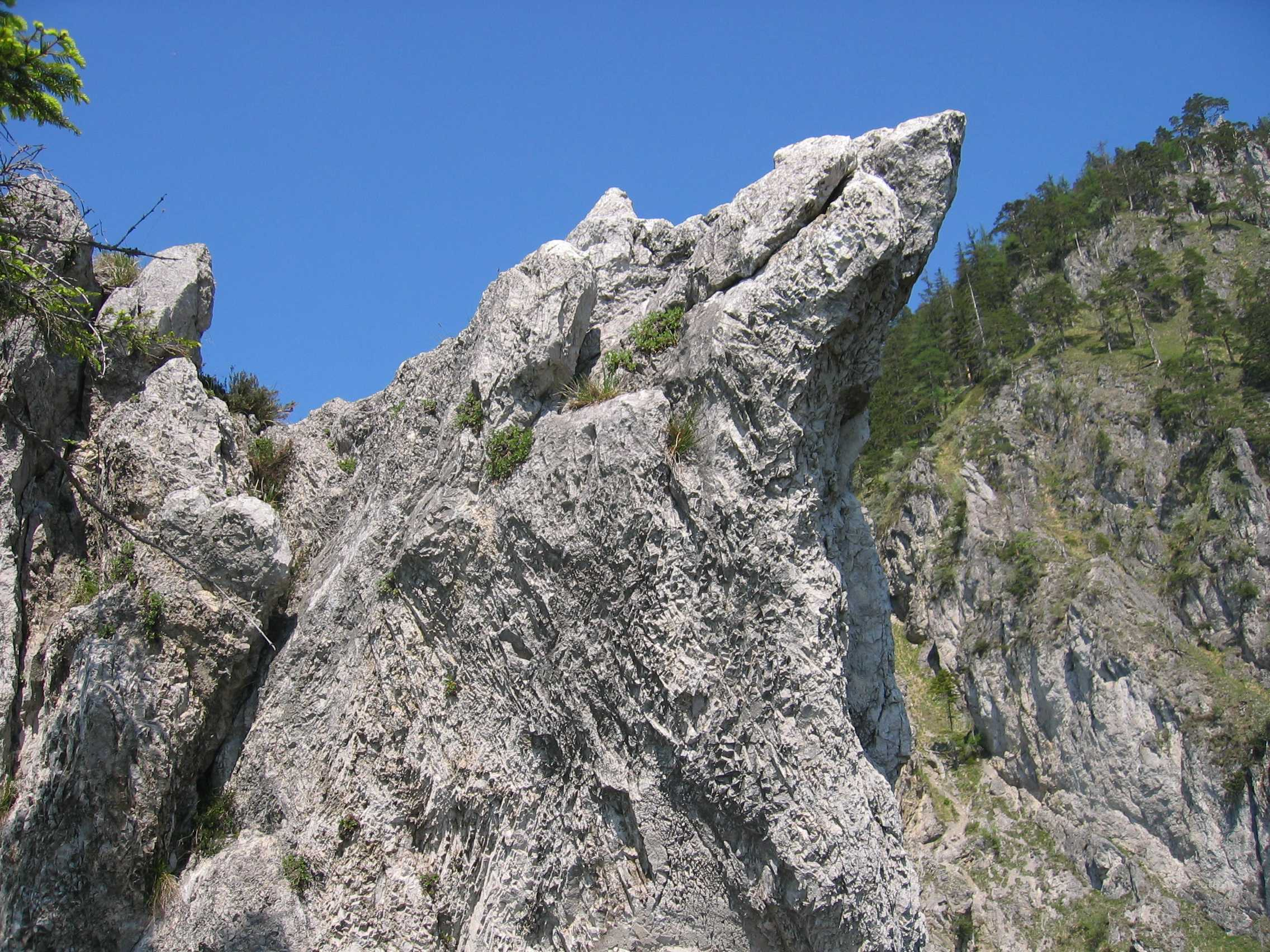
Main dolomite of the Langbathscholle, Kaltenbachwildnis, Austria

Main Dolomite (German: Hauptdolomit, Hungarian: Fődolomit, Italian: Dolomia Principale) is a lithostratigraphic unit in the Alps of Europe. Formation was defined by K.W. Gümbel in 1857.

Middle to Late Triassic sedimentary record in the Alpine realm is characterized by presence of various masses of dolomitic rock formations. In the Northern Calcareous Alps the dolomitic mass of Ladinian - Norian age is divided by the Carnian sandstones and shales of Lunz Formation to the Ladinian - Carnian Wetterstein Dolomite and Norian Main Dolomite. The Main Dolomite reaches higher thickness than underlying dolomites in Alps, therefore it is considered as more important "Main".

== Extent ==
The formation is found in:

- the Northern Limestone Alps and Southern Limestone Alps of the Limestone Alps, a mountain system of the western and Central Eastern Alps.
- the Apennines in Italy
- the Western Carpathians (Tatric, Fatric, Hronic, Silicic units)

== Description ==
It is primarily made of dolomite, ranging from 0 to 2,200 metres (0 to 7,218 ft) in thickness. Main Dolomite is represented by the medium bedded dolomitic layers often with characteristic stromatolitic lamination. The formation was deposited in shallow lagoons during the Late Carnian and Early Norian ages of the Late Triassic Epoch in the Triassic Period, during the Mesozoic Era.

=== Fossil content ===
Fossil sauropodomorph tracks, likely made by a plateosaurid, have been reported from the formation.

== See also ==
- List of dinosaur-bearing rock formations
  - List of stratigraphic units with sauropodomorph tracks
  - List of stratigraphic units with prosauropod tracks
