= Ruhpolding Formation =

Geologic formation in Austria and Germany

- Stratigraphic range: Oxfordian
- Type: Geological formation
- Underlies: Ammergau Formation, Tauglboden Formation, Sillenkopf Formation
- Overlies: Allgäu Formation, Klaus Formation, Strubberg Formation
- Thickness: 5–100 m (16–328 ft)

Lithology
- Primary: Radiolarite

Location
- Region: Tirol; Bavaria
- Country: Austria; Germany

Type section
- Named for: Ruhpolding (Bavaria, Germany)

The Ruhpolding Formation is a sedimentary formation of the Northern Calcareous Alps deposited during the Upper Jurassic. The open marine radiolarite is very rich in silica.

== Definitions ==
The Ruhpolding Formation derives its name from its type locality Ruhpolding, a commune in Upper Bavaria situated at the edge of the Northern Calcareous Alps. The type locality, situated southwest of Ruhpolding (at Gschwendlbach near Röthelmoos, Urschlau) is a bad choice as it doesn't show the characteristic red radiolarites found elsewhere in the Austroalpine domain but only grey to red cherty limestones. This is the reason why Gawlik (2000) suggested a new type profile with a complete development of the radiolarite at Mörtlbach northeast of Hallein.

The formation is also known as Ruhpolding Radiolarite or Ruhpolding Beds.

In a wider context all the radiolarites of Late Bajocian, Callovian, Oxfordian, Kimmeridgian and Early Tithonian age are reunited within the Ruhpolding Radiolarite Group (RRG).

== Occurrence ==
The type locality of the Ruhpolding Formation belongs to the Lechtal Nappe of the Bajuvaric Unit, one of the major tectonic subdivisions of the Northern Calcareous Alps. The occurrence of the formation extends from the Allgäu Alps in the west via the Lechtal Alps to the Chiemgau Alps in the east. The Ruhpolding Formation is also found in the Tirolic Unit to the south of the Bajuvaric Unit and therefore extends into the eastern part of the Northern Calcareous Alps. The Ruhpolding Radiolarite Group is encountered in the Southern Alps and even in the Penninic domain (Piemont Zone).

== Stratigraphy ==
Within the Bajuvaric Unit the Ruhpolding Formation conformably overlies the Chiemgau Beds, further west in the Allgäu Alps it overlies the upper Allgäu Beds. It is conformably overlain by the so-called Aptychus Limestone of the Ammergau Formation. The changeover to the Aptychus Limestone is gradual. The lower contact of the Ruhpolding Formation is very distinct and outlined by a several centimeter thick bedding joint. – as can be seen in the Tauglboden Basin of the northern Tirolic Unit where the Ruhpolding Formation overlies the red limestone of the Klaus Formation. In the Tauglboden Basin the Ruhpolding Formation is followed by the Tauglboden Formation of Kimmeridgian and lower Tithonian age. In the Sillenkopf Basin of the southern Tirolic Unit the Ruhpolding Formation is underlain by the Strubberg Formation and overlain by the Sillenkopf Formation which was deposited at the same time as the Tauglboden Formation.

== Lithology ==
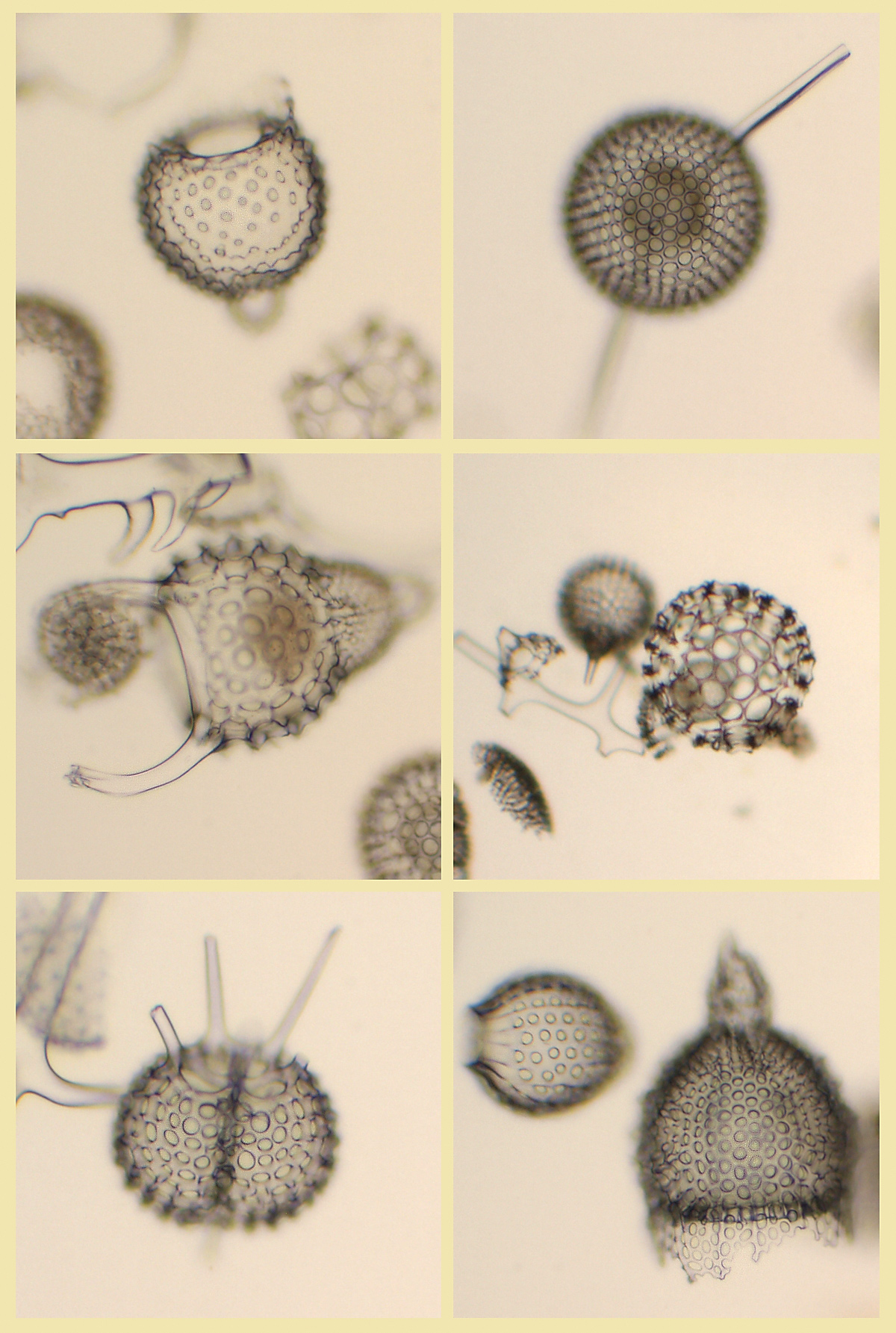
Various radiolarians under the microscope

Lithologically the up to 50 meter thick Ruhpolding Formation consists of black-green to red radiolarites grading into cherty limestones, cherty marls and cherty shales. It has formed from radiolarian ooze. The ooze consolidated diagenetically to thinly layered and regularly banded cherts. The chert layers are usually separated by very thin claystone layers creating a cyclic appearance. This cyclicity might correlate with Milankovic cycles. A plausible diagenetic cause can be excluded due to slump structures that incorporate several individual cycles. The cherts are mainly earthy red, but show greenish-blackish hues in places. The red coloration due to hematite is caused by the complete oxidation of iron compounds in oxygen-rich bottom waters. The red layers show Fe^{3+}/Fe^{2+} > 1, whereas in the greenish layers the ratio is < 1, the coloration in the latter being tied to sericite, chlorite and maybe pyrite.

In thin section it can be observed that the siliceous groundmass is derived from the innumerable skeletons of radiolarians (maximal size 0.1 mm in diameter) altered during diagenesis. The cherts chemical composition nearly approaches 100% silica.

On a macroscopic scale the rock is intensely criss-crossed by net-like fracture systems, which were later filled by calcite. These fractures were opened by tectonic stresses judging from structures like tension gashes.

Tuff layers can be encountered right at the very base of the formation. They are probably a precursor of the later ehrwaldite magmatism.

== Fossils ==
The Ruhpolding Formation consists mainly of microfossils, the bulk being made up by radiolarians. Macrofossils are extremely rare apart from some aptychi, crinoids like Saccocoma, spicules and filaments. Benthic foraminifera can occasionally be found but planktonic foraminifera are completely absent. Amongst the abundant radiolarians the following taxa are present:

- Nassellaria – Amphipyndacidae: Triversus
- Nassellaria – Archaeodigtyomitridae: Archaeodictyomitra
- Nassellaria – Eucyrtidiidae: Stichocapsa
- Nassellaria – Hsuidae: Hsuum
- Nassellaria – Parvicingulidae: Parvicingula
- Nassellaria – Williriedellidae: Williriedellum
- Nassellaria – : Tricolocapsa
- Spumellaria – Angulobracchiidae: Paronaella

== Depositional environment ==
The fully marine Ruhpolding Formation was deposited in the pelagic domain at the northern edge of the Neotethys ocean, as indicated by rare ammonite finds like Hibolites semisulcatus. The water depth of deposition is still disputed. Today radiolarian oozes form below the carbonate compensation depth (CCD) at 4,000 to 5,000 metres (13,000 to 16,000 ft) water depth. In the Upper Jurassic the CCD was probably much higher and ranged somewhere between 2,000 and 3,000 metres (6,600 and 9,800 ft) depth due to a greatly diminished calcareous nanoplankton at that time.

The radiolarian blooms probably were triggered by volcanism and/or changing circulation patterns. The required silica was provided by volcanic exhalations and/or by upwelling.

== Ruhpolding turning point ==
The sedimentation of the radiolarites represents a sudden and drastic change in the sedimentation history of the Northern Calcareous Alps. This event was termed the Ruhpolding turning point (Ruhpoldinger Wende in German). It was a decisive and not a transient, repetitive change, because the deep-water radiolarites and later Aptychen Beds clearly differ in character from the lower and mid-Jurassic sediments.

During the Dogger the turning point was preceded by a rapid drop in sedimentation rates and ensuing thicknesses. This is exemplified by the increasing number of omission surfaces in the upper Klaus-Formation combined with a general slowed-down and more patchy sedimentation. This starved sediment supply is probably due to a continuous deepening of the basin.

The turning point is also marked by tectonic movements enhancing the topographic differences of the seafloor. For instance already existing topographic highs were raised into shallow water. On these raised areas the Ruhpolding radiolarites did not accumulate; instead red limestones like the Agathakalk or the Hasselberg Limestone continued to be deposited here. This tectonically accentuated profile was slowly levelled later during the sedimentation of the Aptychen Beds.

Another characteristic of the Ruhpolding turning point is the associated volcanic activity. The tuff layers right at the onset of the Ruhpolding formation are without doubt the precursors of the Upper Jurassic magmatic pulse in the Alps.

Also noticeable is a pronounced increase in autokinetic sediments such as turbidites, debris flows, slides at or near the turning point. Good examples are the limestones of the Barmstein, the Sonnwendbreccia, the Tauglboden Formation and the Strubberg Formation.

The gradual replacement of the radiolarian oozes of the Ruhpolding Formation by coccolith oozes of the overlying Aptychen Beds can be explained by further deepening of the basin and/or by blooming calcareous nanoplankton.

== Age ==
The Ruhpolding-Formation was deposited during the Late Oxfordian, about 157 to 155 million years BP. This biostratigraphic age (maximum age) is based on ammonite finds in the upper Klaus Formation.

Meanwhile, the general diachronicity of the Rupolding Formation has been recognized. By using radiolarian stratigraphy a more recent study by Wegener, Suzuki and Gawlick (2003) found a Middle Oxfordian to Lower Kimmeridgian age for the upper red radiolarite, i. e. an absolute age of 159 – 154 million years BP.

For the Ruhpolding Radiolarite Group, Suzuki and Gawlick recommend the time span Bajocian before the Lower Tithonian, or in absolute terms 171 through 147 Million Years BP.
