= Tauglboden Formation =

Geologic formation in Austria

- Stratigraphic range: Oxfordian; ~161–151 Ma
- Type: Formation

Lithology
- Primary: Radiolarite

Location
- Coordinates: 47.7°N 13.3°E
- Approximate paleocoordinates: 33.9°N 23.1°E
- Region: Salzburg
- Country: Austria
- Tauglboden Formation (Austria)

The Tauglboden Formation is a geologic formation in Salzburg, Austria. It preserves fossils dating back to the Oxfordian stage of the Jurassic period. The radiolarites were deposited in a deep marine environment.

== Fossil content ==
The following fossils were reported from the formation:

Radiolarians

- Nassellaria
  - Dibolachras chandrika
  - Mirifusus guadalupensis
  - M. mediodilatatus
  - Podocapsa amphitreptera
  - Spongocapsula palmerae
  - Podobursa sp.
- Polycystina
  - Homoeoparonaella argolidensis
  - H. elegans
  - Orbiculiforma mclaughlini
  - Tritrabs casmaliensis
  - T. ewingi
  - T. exotica
  - Patulibracchium cf. californiaensis
  - Pentasphaera sp.

== See also ==
- List of fossiliferous stratigraphic units in Austria
- Ruhpolding Formation
