= Clathrocyclas elegans =

Scientific classification
- Domain: Eukaryota
- Clade: Sar
- Clade: Rhizaria
- Phylum: Retaria
- Class: Polycystina
- Order: Nassellaria
- Family: Theoperidae
- Genus: Clathrocyclas
- Species: C. elegans

Binomial name
- Clathrocyclas elegans (Lipman, 1950) Kozlova, 1990

Species of single-celled organism

Clathrocyclas elegans is a species of radiolarian in the family Theoperidae.
