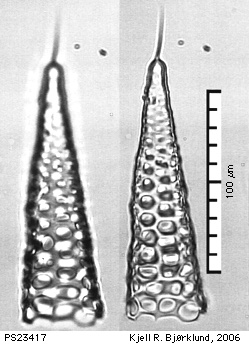
- Cornutella profunda under a microscope

Scientific classification
- Domain: Eukaryota
- Clade: Sar
- Clade: Rhizaria
- Phylum: Retaria
- Class: Polycystinea
- Order: Nassellaria
- Family: Theoperidae
- Genus: Cornutella
- Species: C. profunda

Binomial name
- Cornutella profunda Ehrenberg, 1856

= Cornutella profunda =

Species of single-celled organism

Cornutella profunda is a species of radiolarian in the family Theoperidae and the genus Cornutella. The abundance and actual geographic span of C. profunda has not yet been fully explored, however few have been caught in various regions around the world. Samples have seen in larger numbers in the Adriatic Sea, the South China Sea, and far off the coast of Southern Africa near Namibia, and in smaller numbers in all other oceans around the world.

== Description ==
Cornutella profunda has been observed possessing a long conical shaped skeleton with holes over the entire body of the skeleton. They possess a single pseudopod which will extend from the tip of the conical structure. Like all species of radiolarian, C. profunda secretes a siliceous external skeleton and will contribute to the building of Siliceous ooze on the ocean floor once it dies. Their bodies are often found beneath this layer of "marine snow" in the sediments of oceans around the globe. They are considered to be Holoplankton and can be found living primarily at depths greater than 300 meters in all oceans, though they can be found at different depths. Due to a lack of research and the fragile nature of radiolarian skeletons, it is unknown what C. profunda does for food. Some radiolarians are filter feeders, some are hunters using their pseudopodia to capture prey, and some even have symbionts when living in higher waters. It is estimated that radiolarians within the class Polycystina live for approximately 1–2 months.

== Potential uses ==
Cornutella profunda, as well as several other radiolarian species, have been observed in a variety of marine environments. Since radiolarians are holoplanktonic, they can easily be moved around by currents that are moving in the water. These, as well as others, could be used to track water masses as they move through the world's oceans.
