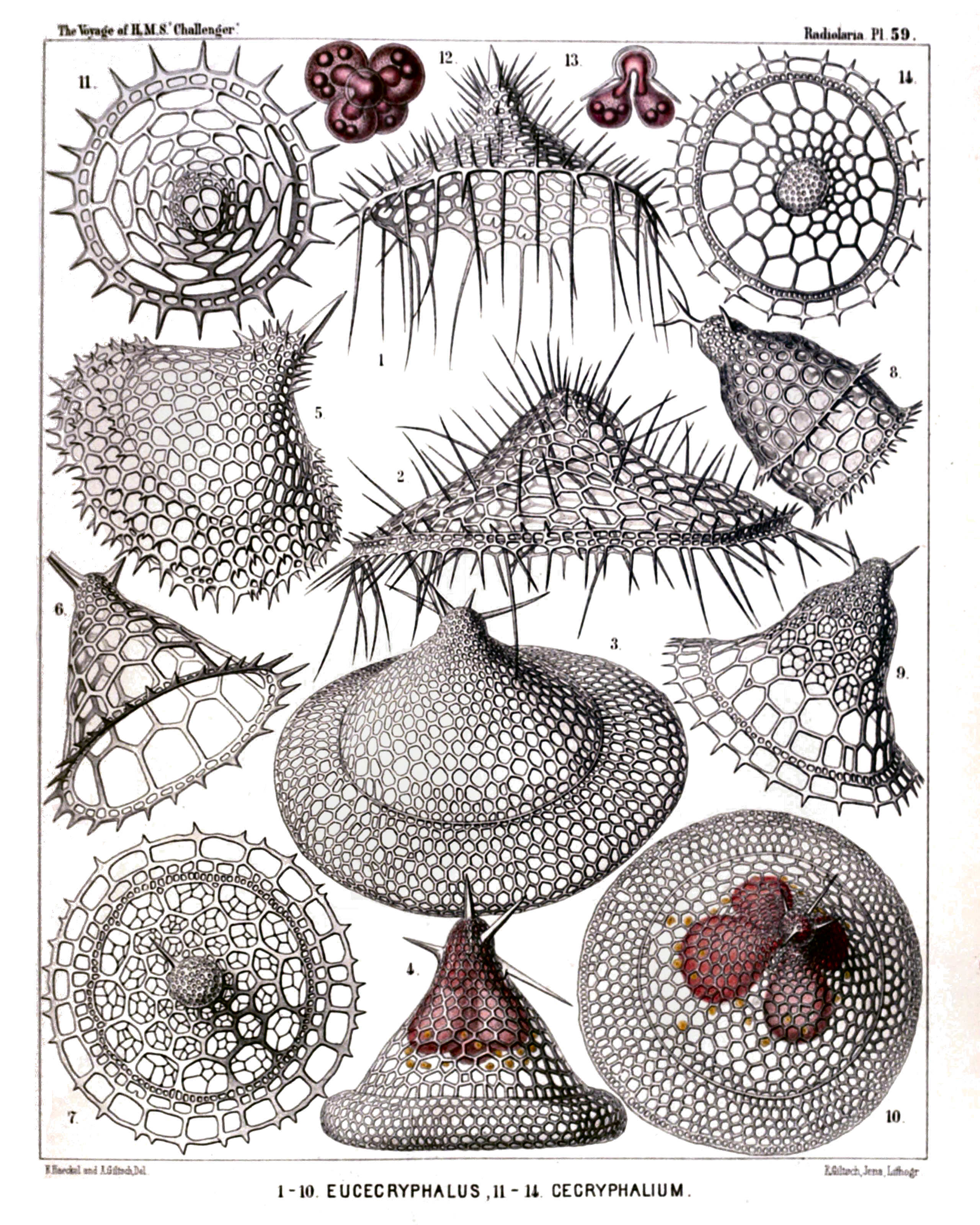
- Illustration from Report on the Radiolaria collected by H.M.S. Challenger during the years 1873-1876. Part III. Plate 59. Tripocyrtida, Podocyrtida et Phormocyrtida. Fig. 5. Clathrocyclas cassiopejæ, n. sp., × 400; Fig. 6. Clathrocyclas alcmenæ, n. sp., ×400; Fig. 7. Clathrocyclas latonæ, n. sp., ×400 (Apical view); Fig. 9. Clathrocyclas ionis, n. sp., ×400; Fig. 11. Clathrocyclas europæ, n. sp., ×400 (Apical view of the shell, after removal of the cephalis); Fig. 12. Clathrocyclas europæ, n. sp., ×400 (Central capsule, seen from above, with the quadrilobate nucleus); Fig. 13. Clathrocyclas danaës, n. sp., ×300 (Vertical section through the cephalis and the quadrilobate central capsule, with the quadrilobate nucleus); Fig. 14. Clathrocyclas danaës, n. sp., ×300 (Apical view of the shell)

Scientific classification
- Domain: Eukaryota
- Clade: Sar
- Clade: Rhizaria
- Phylum: Retaria
- Class: Polycystina
- Order: Nassellaria
- Family: Theoperidae
- Genus: Clathrocyclas; Haeckel, 1881

Species
- Several, including: Clathrocyclas cassiopeiae Haeckel, 1887; Clathrocyclas elegans (Lipman, 1950) Kozlova, 1990

= Clathrocyclas =

Genus of single-celled organisms

Clathrocyclas is a genus of radiolarians in the family Theoperidae.
