= Cyrtopera =

Scientific classification
- Domain: Eukaryota
- Clade: Sar
- Clade: Rhizaria
- Phylum: Retaria
- Class: Polycystina
- Order: Nassellaria
- Family: Theoperidae
- Genus: Cyrtopera; Haeckel, 1881

Species
- Cyrtopera aglaolampa Takahashi, 1991; Cyrtopera laguncula

Genus of single-celled organisms

Cyrtopera is a genus of radiolarians in the family Theoperidae.
