= Cornutanna =

Scientific classification
- Domain: Eukaryota
- Clade: Sar
- Clade: Rhizaria
- Phylum: Retaria
- Class: Polycystina
- Order: Nassellaria
- Genus: Cornutanna; Haeckel, 1881

Species
- †Cornutanna elegans Principi, 1909 - Miocene of Reggio Emilia, Italy; Cornutanna orthoconus Haeckel, 1887

Genus of single-celled organisms

Cornutanna is a genus of radiolarians in the order Nassellaria.
