= Rhaphidozoum =

Scientific classification
- Domain: Eukaryota
- Clade: Sar
- Clade: Rhizaria
- Phylum: Retaria
- Class: Polycystinea
- Order: Nassellaria
- Family: Collozoidae
- Subfamily: Sphaerozoidae
- Genus: Rhaphidozoum

Species
- 1; see text

Genus of radiolaria

Rhaphidozoum is a radiolarian genus reported in the subfamily Sphaerozoidae. The genus contains bioluminescent species. It is a genus of colonial radiolarians (as opposed to solitary).

== Species ==
The following species are recognized:

- Rhaphidozoum pandora Haeckel, 1887
