= Sphaerozoum =

Scientific classification
- Domain: Eukaryota
- Clade: Sar
- Clade: Rhizaria
- Phylum: Retaria
- Class: Polycystinea
- Order: Nassellaria
- Family: Collozoidae
- Subfamily: Collosphaeridae
- Genus: Sphaerozoum

Species
- 1; see text

Genus of radiolaria

Sphaerozoum is a radiolarian genus formerly reported in the subfamily Sphaerozoidae, now reported in the Collosphaeridae. The genus contains bioluminescent species. It is a genus of colonial radiolarians (as opposed to solitary).

== Species ==
The following species are recognized:

- Sphaerozoum punctatum (Huxley) Mueller, 1858
