= Myxosphaera =

Scientific classification
- Domain: Eukaryota
- Clade: Sar
- Clade: Rhizaria
- Phylum: Retaria
- Class: Polycystinea
- Order: Nassellaria
- Family: Collozoidae
- Subfamily: Collosphaeridae
- Genus: Myxosphaera; Brandt, 1885

Species
- see text

Genus of radiolarian

Myxosphaera is a radiolarian genus in the Collosphaeridae. The genus may contain bioluminescent species. It is a genus of colonial radiolarians (as opposed to solitary).

== Species ==
The following species are known (incomplete list):

- Myxosphaera coerulea Haeckel
