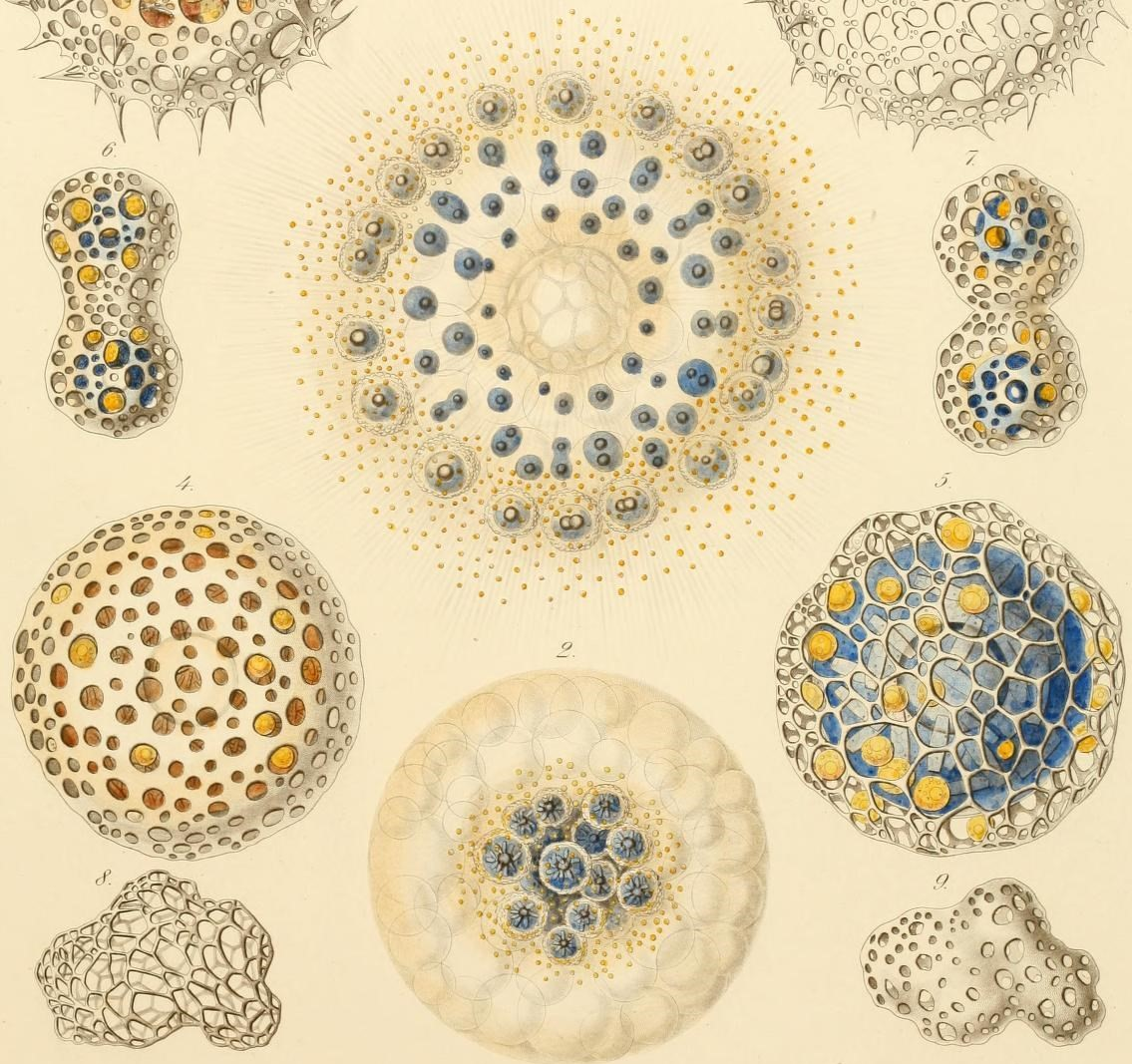
- Illustration of Collosphaera huxleyi

Scientific classification
- Domain: Eukaryota
- Clade: Sar
- Clade: Rhizaria
- Phylum: Retaria
- Class: Polycystinea
- Order: Nassellaria
- Family: Collozoidae
- Subfamily: Collosphaeridae
- Genus: Collosphaera; Müller 1859

Species
- 6; see text

= Collosphaera =

Genus of radiolaria

Collosphaera is a radiolarian genus in the family Collosphaeridae. The genus contains bioluminescent species. It is a genus of colonial radiolarians (as opposed to solitary).

== Species ==
The following species are recognized:

- Collosphaera armata Brandt
- Collosphaera confossa Takahashi, 1991
- Collosphaera huxleyi Mueller, 1855
- Collosphaera macropora Popofsky, 1917
- Collosphaera polygona Haeckel, 1887
- Collosphaera tuberosa Haeckel, 1887
