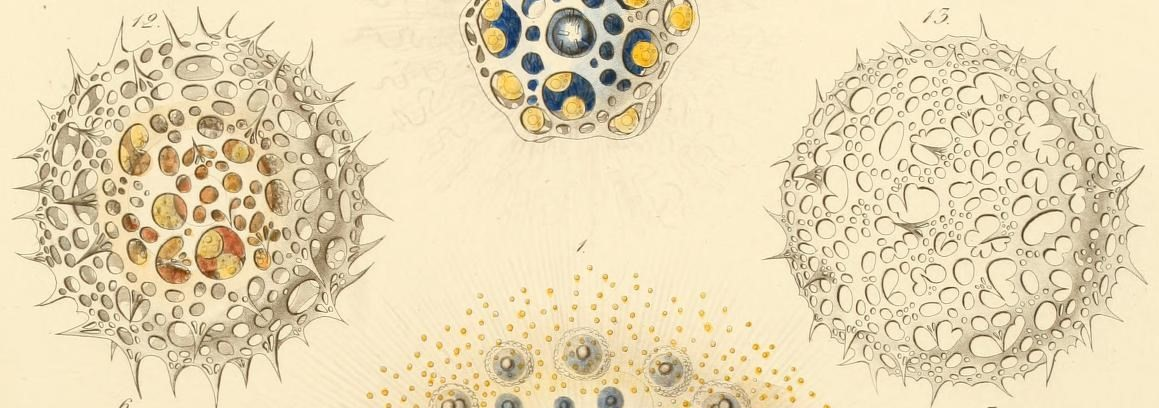
- Illustration of Acrosphaera spinosa

Scientific classification
- Domain: Eukaryota
- Clade: Sar
- Clade: Rhizaria
- Phylum: Retaria
- Class: Polycystinea
- Order: Nassellaria
- Family: Collozoidae
- Subfamily: Collosphaeridae
- Genus: Acrosphaera

Species
- 5; see text

= Acrosphaera =

Genus of radiolaria

Acrosphaera is a radiolarian genus in the Collosphaeridae. The genus contains bioluminescent species. It is a genus of colonial radiolarians (as opposed to solitary).

== Species ==
The following species are recognized:

- Acrosphaera arktios (Nigrini, 1970)
- Acrosphaera cyrtodon (Haeckel) Strelkov & Reshetnyak, 1971
- Acrosphaera lappacea (Haeckel) Johnson & Nigrini, 1980
- Acrosphaera murrayana (Haeckel) Hilmers, 1906
- Acrosphaera spinosa Caulet, 1986
- Acrosphaera trepanata
