= Thalassicolla =

Scientific classification
- Domain: Eukaryota
- Clade: Sar
- Clade: Rhizaria
- Phylum: Retaria
- Class: Polycystinea
- Order: Nassellaria
- Family: Collozoidae
- Subfamily: Thalassicollidae
- Genus: Thalassicolla

Species
- 1; see text

Genus of radiolaria

Thalassicolla is a radiolarian genus reported in the Thalassicollidae. The genus contains bioluminescent species. It is a genus of solitary (not colonial) radiolarians.

== Species ==
The following species are recognized (incomplete list):

- Thalassicolla nucleata Huxley, 1851
