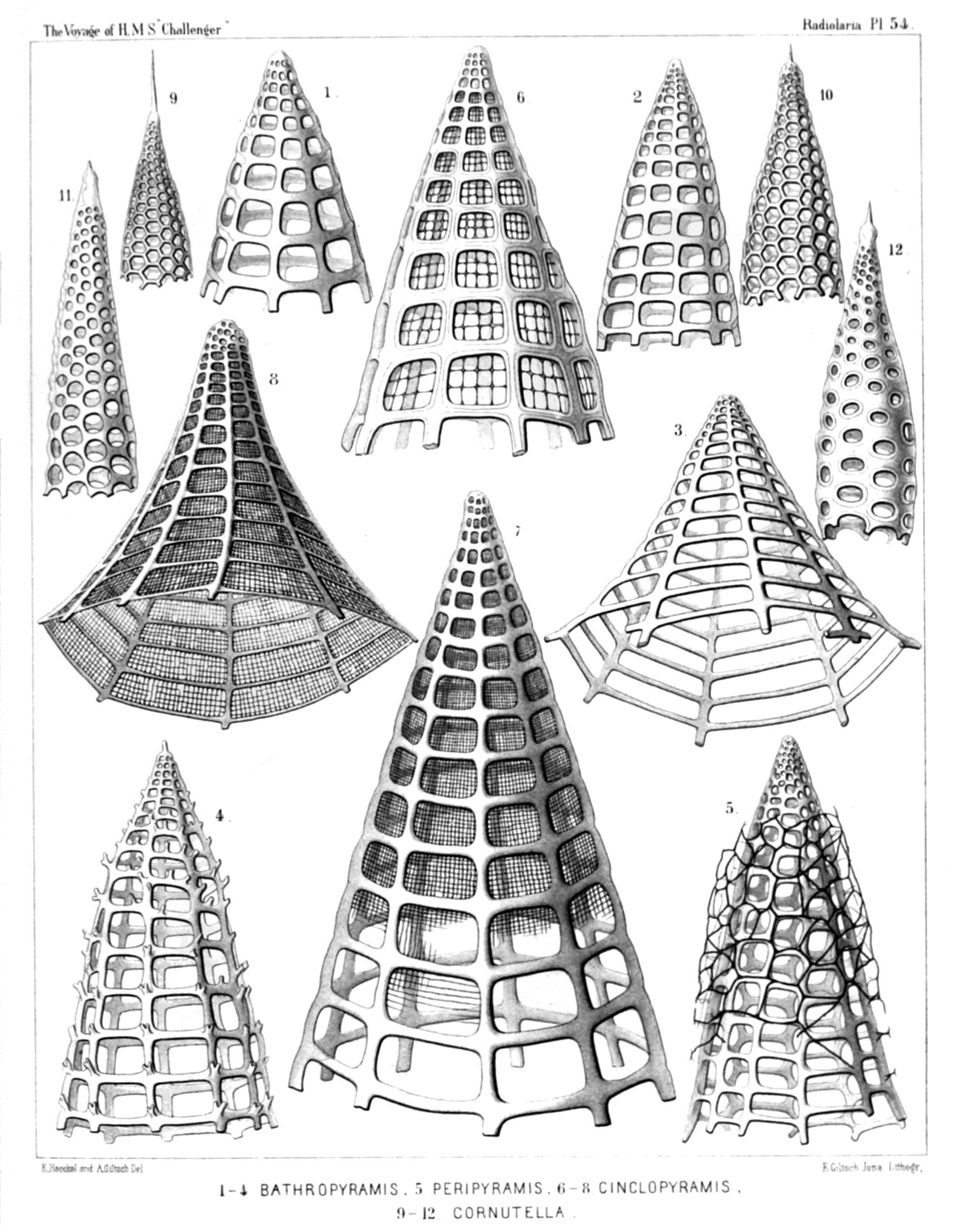
- Illustration from Report on the Radiolaria collected by H.M.S. Challenger during the years 1873-1876. Part III. Plate 54. Phænocalpida, Cyrtocalpida, Anthocyrtida et Sethocyrtida. Fig. 9. Cornutella hexagona, n. sp., × 400

Scientific classification
- Domain: Eukaryota
- Clade: Sar
- Clade: Rhizaria
- Phylum: Retaria
- Class: Polycystina
- Order: Nassellaria
- Family: Theoperidae
- Genus: Cornutella; Ehrenberg, 1838

Species
- †Cornutella clathrata Ehrenberg (type); Cornutella hexagona; Cornutella profunda Ehrenberg, 1856

= Cornutella (radiolarian) =

Genus of single-celled organisms

Cornutella is a genus of radiolarians in the family Theoperidae. C. clathrata, the type species, was described from the Miocene of Caltanisetta, Sicily.
