= Radiolarite =

Type of sedimentary rock

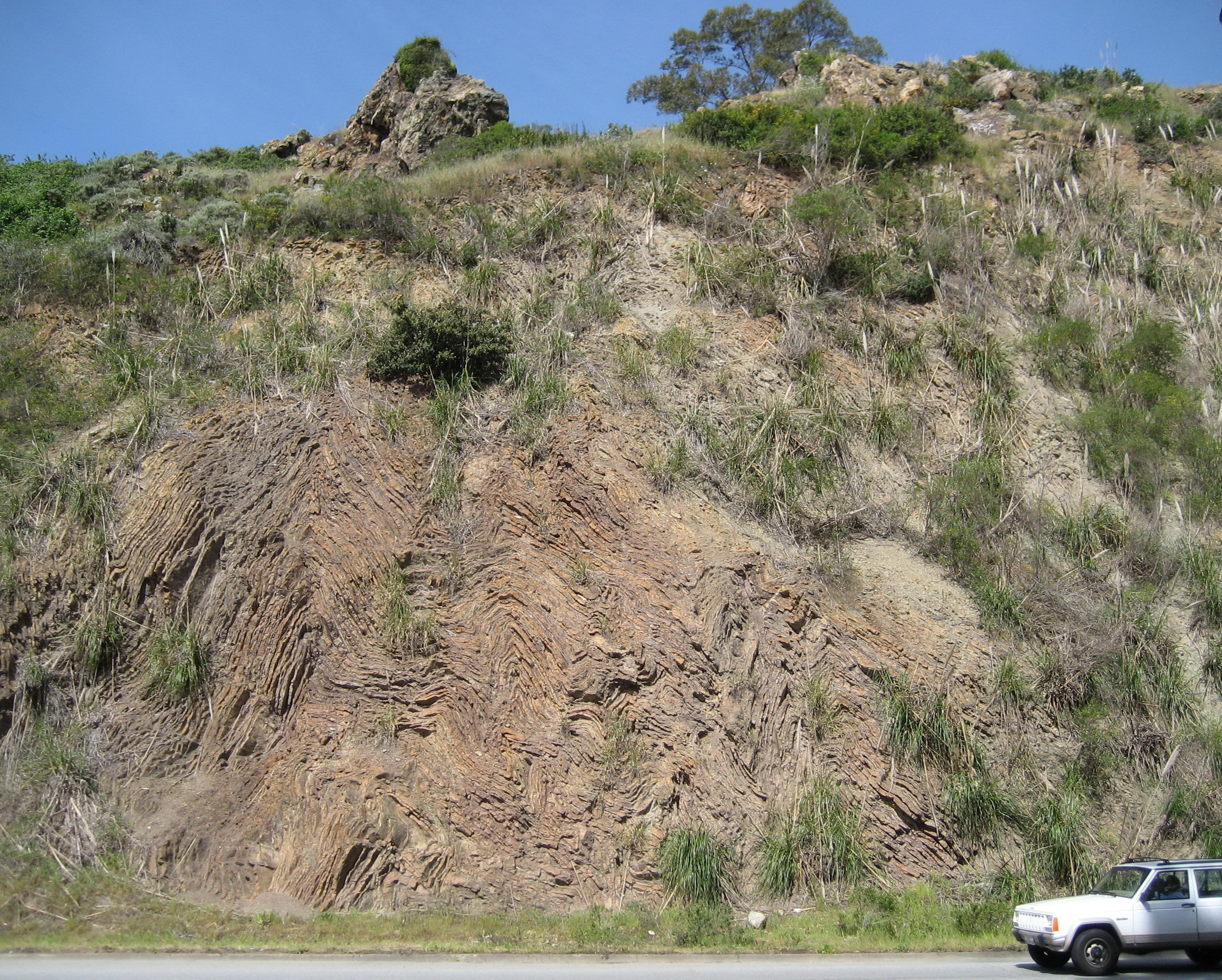
Outcrop of Franciscan radiolarian chert in San Francisco, California

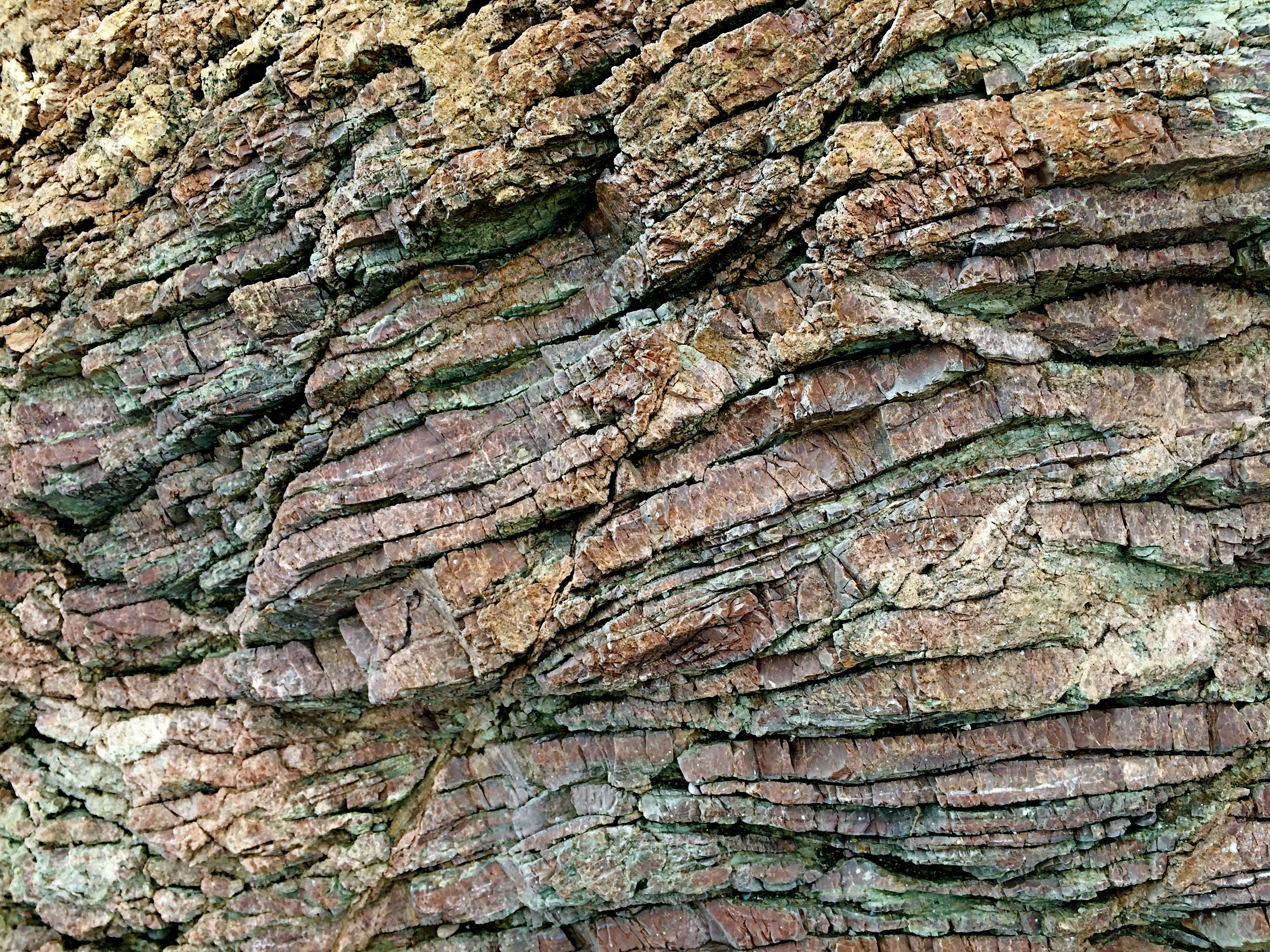
Radiolarian chert outcrop near Cambria, California. Individual beds range from about 2 to 5 cm thick

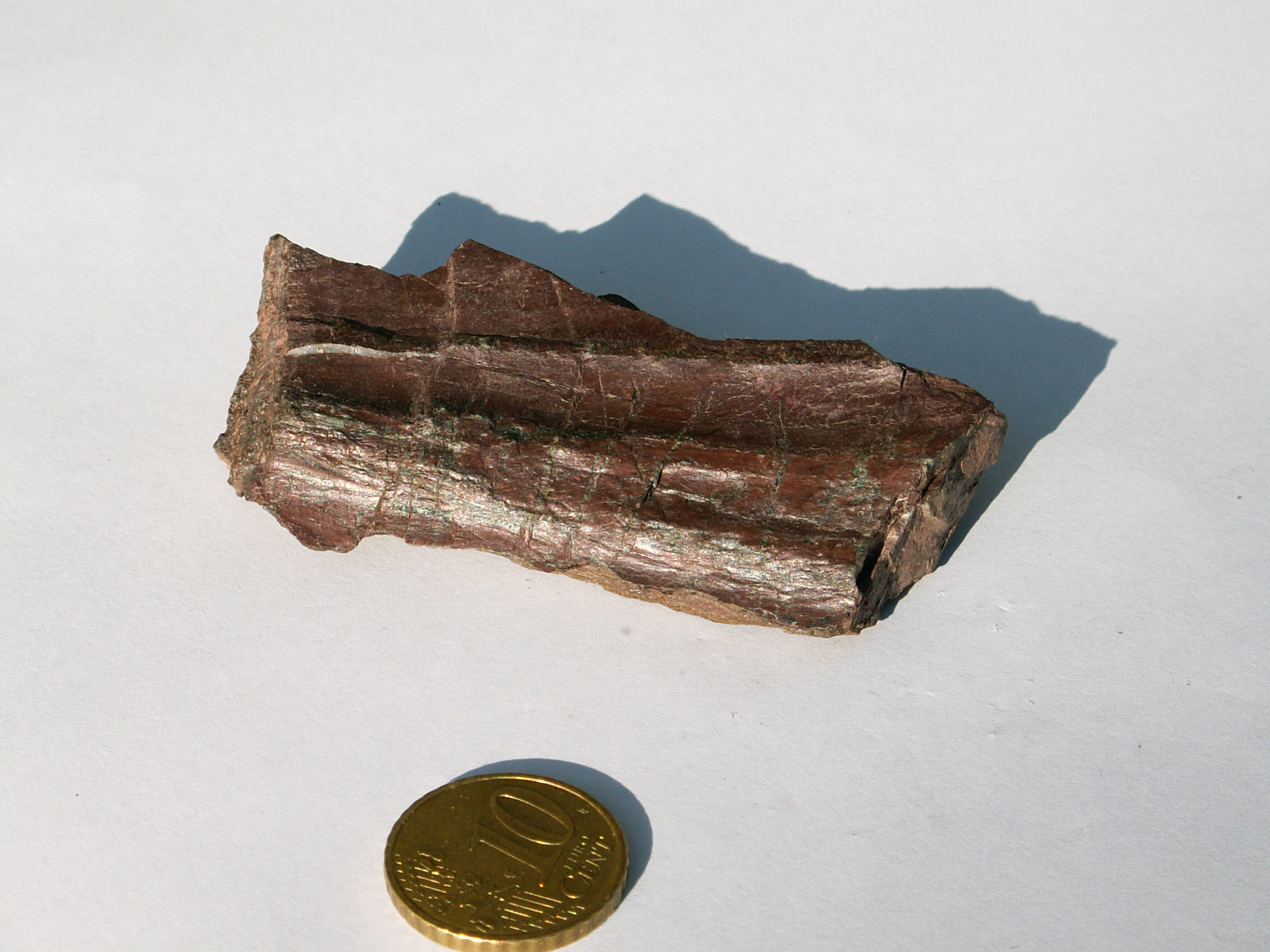
Radiolarite (Jurassic) from the Alps.

Radiolarite is a siliceous, comparatively hard, fine-grained, chert-like, and homogeneous sedimentary rock that is composed predominantly of the microscopic remains of radiolarians. This term is also used for indurated radiolarian oozes and sometimes as a synonym of radiolarian earth. However, radiolarian earth is typically regarded by Earth scientists to be the unconsolidated equivalent of a radiolarite. A radiolarian chert is well-bedded, microcrystalline radiolarite that has a well-developed siliceous cement or groundmass.

== Mineralogy and petrology ==
Radiolarites are biogenic, marine, finely layered sedimentary rocks. The layers reveal an interchange of clastic mica grains, radiolarian tests, carbonates and organic pigments. Clay minerals are usually not abundant. Radiolarites deposited in relatively shallow depths can interleave with carbonate layers. Yet most often radiolarites are pelagic, deep water sediments.

Radiolarites are very brittle rocks and hard to split. They break conchoidally with sharp edges. During weathering they decompose into small, rectangular pieces. The colors range from light (whitish) to dark (black) via red, green and brown hues.

Radiolarites are composed mainly of radiolarian tests and their fragments. The skeletal material consists of amorphous silica (opal A). Radiolarians are marine, planktonic protists with an inner skeleton. Their sizes range from 0.1 to 0.5 millimeters. Amongst their major orders albaillellaria, ectinaria, the spherical spumellaria and the hood-shaped nassellaria can be distinguished.

== Sedimentation ==
According to Takahashi (1983) radiolarians stay for 2 to 6 weeks in the euphotic zone (productive surface layer to 200 meters water depth) before they start sinking. Their descent through 5000 meters of ocean water can take from two weeks to as long as 14 months.

As soon as the protist dies and starts decaying, silica dissolution affects the skeleton. The dissolution of silica in the oceans parallels the temperature/depth curve and is most effective in the uppermost 750 meters of the water column, farther below it rapidly diminishes. Upon reaching the sediment/water interface the dissolution drastically increases again. Several centimeters below this interface the dissolution continues also within the sediment, but at a much reduced rate.

It is in fact astonishing that any radiolarian tests survive at all. It is estimated that only as little as one percent of the original skeletal material is preserved in radiolarian oozes. According to Dunbar & Berger (1981) even this minimal preservation of one percent is merely due to the fact that radiolarians form colonies and that they are occasionally embedded in fecal pellets and other organic aggregates. The organic wrappings act as a protection for the tests (Casey et al. 1979) and spare them from dissolution, but of course speed up the sinking time by a factor of 10.

== Diagenesis, compaction and sedimentation rates ==
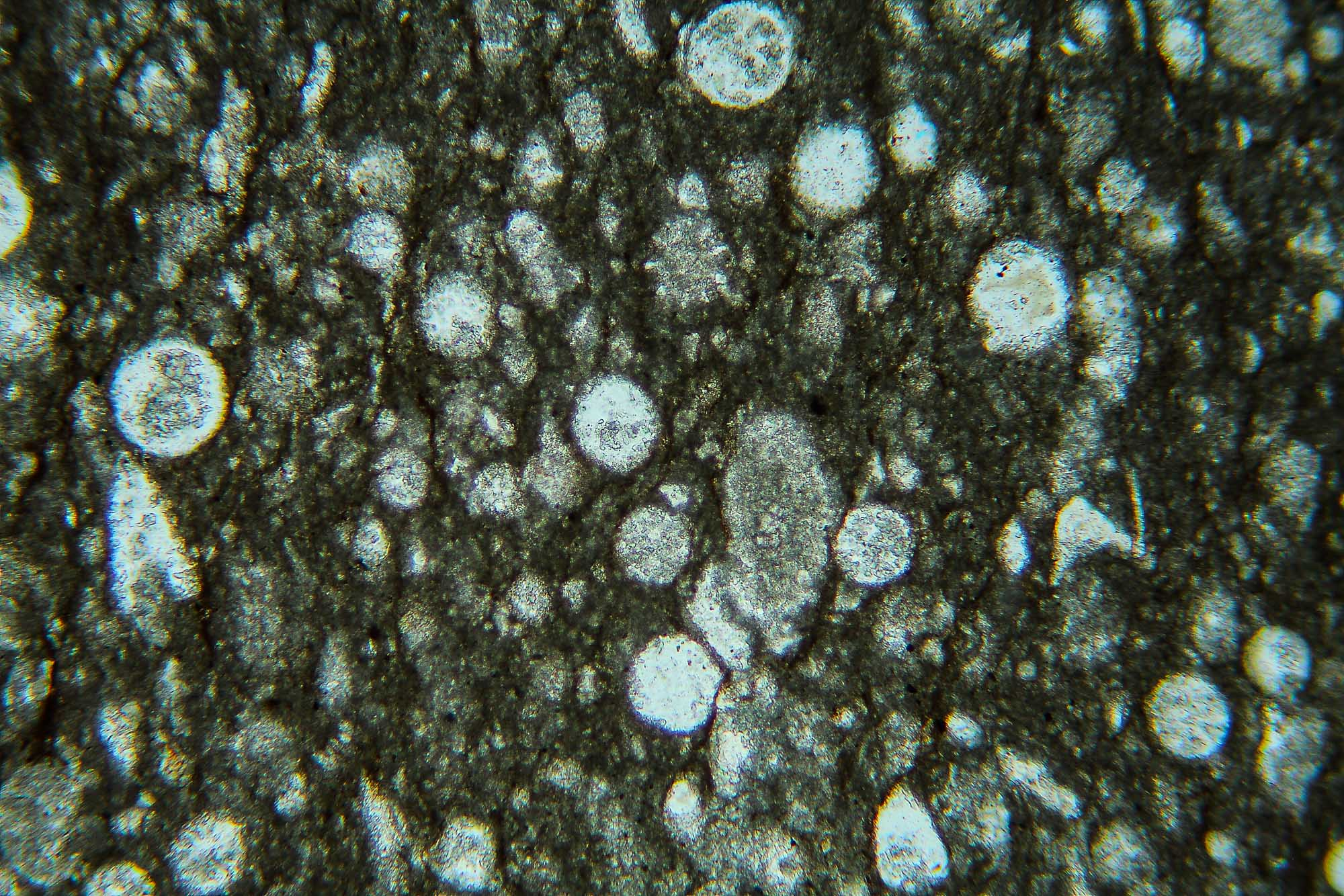
Whetstone limestone from the Ammergau Alps, Upper Bavaria with round radiolarian remains (thin section). The abrasive effect of the whetstones results from the even distribution of the hard radiolarian skeletons in the soft limestone matrix.

After deposition diagenetic processes start affecting the freshly laid down sediment. The silica skeletons are etched and the original opal A slowly commences to transform into opal CT (opal with crystallites of cristobalite and tridymite). With increasing temperature and pressure the transformation proceeds to chalcedony and finally to stable, cryptocrystalline quartz. These phase changes are accompanied by a decrease in porosity of the ooze which becomes manifest as a compaction of the sediment.

The compaction of radiolarites is dependent on their chemical composition and correlates positively with the original SiO_{2}-content. The compaction factor varies generally between 3.2 and 5, which means that 1 meter of consolidated sediment is equivalent to 3.2 to 5 meters of ooze. The alpine radiolarites of the Upper Jurassic for instance show sedimentation rates of 7 to 15.5 meters/million years (or 0.007 to 0.0155 millimeters/year), which after compaction is equivalent to 2.2 to 3.1 meters/million years. As a comparison the radiolarites of the Pindos Mountains in Greece yield a comparable value of 1.8 to 2.0 meters/million years, whereas the radiolarites of the Eastern Alps have a rather small sedimentation rate of 0.71 meters/million years. According to Iljima et al. 1978 the Triassic radiolarites of central Japan reveal an exceptionally high sedimentation rate of 27 to 34 meters/million years.

Recent non-consolidated radiolarian oozes have sedimentation rates of 1 to 5 meters/million years. In radiolarian oozes deposited in the equatorial Eastern Atlantic 11.5 meters/million years have been measured. In upwelling areas like off the Peruvian coast extremely high values of 100 meters/million years were reported.

== Depth of deposition ==
The view that radiolarites are strictly deposited under pelagic (deep water) conditions cannot be asserted any longer. Layers enriched in radiolarians have been found in shallow water limestones, for example the Solnhofen limestone and the Werkkalk Formation of Bavaria. What seems to be important for the preservation of radiolarian oozes is that they are deposited well below the storm wave base and below the jets of erosive surface currents.

Radiolarites without any carbonates have most likely been sedimented below the carbonate compensation depth (CCD). Note that due to changing atmospheric CO_{2} concentrations the CCD has not been stationary in the geological past and is also a function of latitude. At present, the CCD reaches a maximum depth of about 5000 meters near the equator while being as shallow as 4200 meters in the north Pacific.

== Banding and ribbons ==
The characteristic banding and ribbon-like layering often observed in radiolarites is primarily due to changing sediment influx, which is secondarily enhanced by diagenetic effects. In the simple two component system clay/silica with constant clay supply the rhythmically changing radiolarian blooms are responsible for creating a clay-chert interlayering. These purely sedimentary differences become enhanced during diagenesis as the silica leaves the clayey layers and migrates towards the opal-rich horizons. Two situations occur: with high silica input and constant clay background sedimentation thick chert layers form. On the other hand, when the silica input is constant and the clay signal varies rhythmically fairly thick clay bands interrupted by thin chert bands accumulate. By adding carbonates as a third component complicated successions can be created, because silica is not only incompatible with clays but also with carbonates. During diagenesis the silica within the carbonate-rich layers starts pinching and coagulates into ribbons, nodules and other irregular concretions. Resulting are complex layering relationships that depend on the initial clay/silica/carbonate ratio and the temporal variations of the single components during sedimentation.

== Occurrence in time and space ==
=== Paleozoic ===
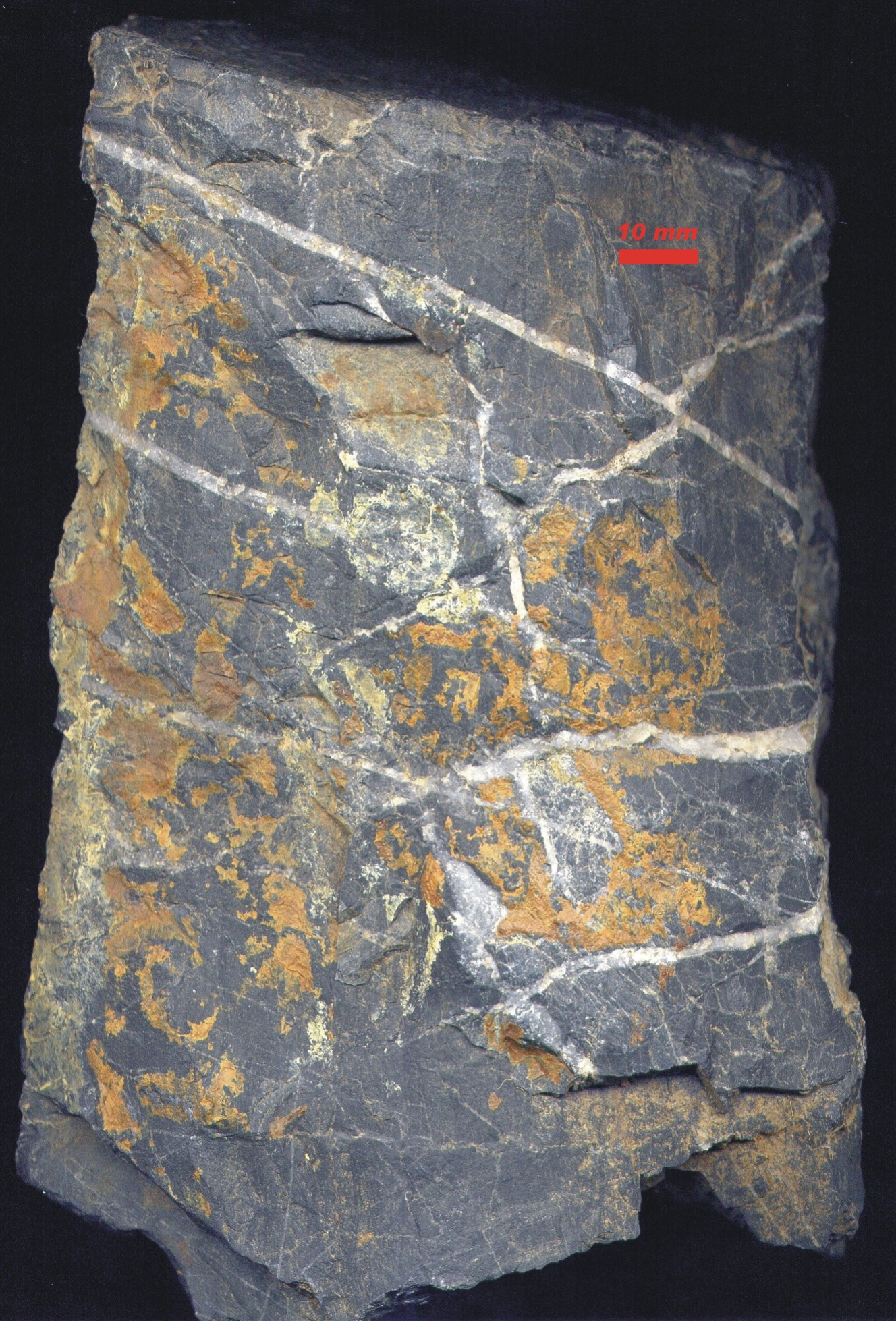
Silurian lydite of Saxony, near Nossen (Nossen-Wilsdruff Slate Mountains)

The oldest known radiolarites come from the Upper Cambrian of Kazakhstan. Radiolarian ooze was sedimented here over a time span of 15 million years into the Lower Ordovician. The deep water sediments were deposited near the paleoequator and are associated with remnants of oceanic crust. The dating has been done with conodonts. In more lime-rich sections four radiolarian faunal associations were identified. The oldest, rather impoverished fauna dates back well into the second stage of the Ordovician (Arenigian). The youngest fauna consists already of 15 different taxa and belongs to the fifth stage (Lower Caradocian).

During the Middle Ordovician (Upper Darriwilian) radiolarites were formed near Ballantrae in Scotland. Here radiolarian cherts overlie spilites and volcanic rocks. Radiolarites are also found in the nearby Southern Uplands where they are associated with pillow lava.

The Scottish radiolarites are followed by deposits in Newfoundland from the Middle and Upper Ordovician. The red Strong Island Chert for instance rests on ophiolites.

At the Silurian/Devonian boundary black cherts (locally called lydites or flinty slates) developed from radiolarians mainly in the Franconian Forest region and in the Vogtland in Germany.

Of great importance are the novaculites from Arkansas, Oklahoma and Texas which were deposited at the close of the Devonian. The novaculites are milky-white, thinly-bedded cherts of great hardness; they underwent a low-grade metamorphism during the Ouachita orogeny. Their mineralogy consists of microquartz with a grain-size of 5 to 35 μm. The microquartz is derived from the sclerae of sponges and the tests of radiolarians.

During the Mississippian black lydites were sedimented in the Rhenish Massif in Germany. The Lower Permian of Sicily hosts radiolarites in limestone olistoliths, at the same period radiolarites have been reported from northwestern Turkey (Karakaya complex of the Pontides). Radiolarites from the Phyllite Zone of Crete date back to the Middle Permian. The radiolarites from the Hawasina nappes in Oman closed the end of the Permian. Towards the end of the Paleozoic radiolarites formed also along the southern margin of Laurasia near Mashad in Iran.

=== Mesozoic ===
During the Triassic (Upper Norian and Rhaetian) cherty, platy limestones are deposited in the Tethyan region, an example being the Hornsteinplattenkalk of the Frauenkogel Formation in the southern Karawanks of Austria. They are composed of interlayered cherts and micrites separated by irregular, non-planar bedding surfaces. The cherty horizons have originated from radiolarian-rich limestone layers which subsequently underwent silicification. Similar sediments in Greece incorporate layers with calcareous turbidites. On local horsts and farther upslope these sediments undergo a facies change to red, radiolarian-rich, ammonite-bearing limestones. In central Japan clay-rich radiolarites were laid down as bedded cherts in the Upper Triassic. Their depositional environment was a shallow marginal sea with rather high accumulation rates of 30 meters/million years. Besides radiolarians sponge spicules are very prominent in these sediments.

From the Upper Bajocian (Middle Jurassic) onwards radiolarites accumulated in the Alps. The onset of the sedimentation was diachronous but the end in the Lower Tithonian rather abrupt. These alpine radiolarites belong to the Ruhpolding Radiolarite Group (RRG) and are found in the Northern Calcareous Alps and in the Penninic of France and Switzerland (Graubünden). Associated are the radiolarites of Corsica. The radiolarites of the Ligurian Apennines appear somewhat later towards the end of the Jurassic.

From the Middle Jurassic onwards radiolarites also formed in the Pacific domain along the West Coast of North America, an example being the Franciscan complex. The radiolarites of the Great Valley Sequence are younger and have an Upper Jurassic age.

The radiolarites of California are paralleled by radiolarite sedimentation in the equatorial Western Pacific east of the Mariana Trench. The accumulation of radiolarian ooze on Jurassic oceanic crust was continuous here from the Callovian onward and lasted till the end of the Valanginian.

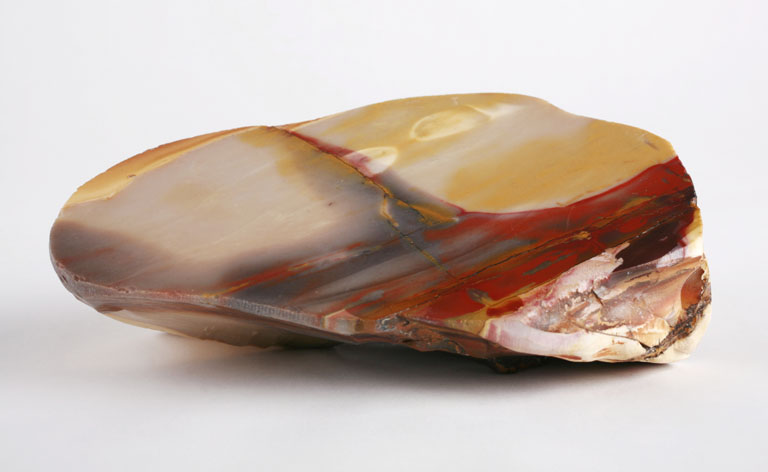
Mookaite from the Kennedy Ranges, near Gascoyne Junction, Western Australia in the permanent collection of The Children's Museum of Indianapolis.

The Windalia radiolarite is a Lower Cretaceous (Aptian) formation in Western Australia. The formation contains abundant foraminifera, radiolaria and calcareous nanoplankton fossils Locally the varicolored opaline to chalcedonic radiolarite is mined and used as an ornamental stone termed mookaite. At the same time radiolarites were deposited at the Marin Headlands near San Francisco.

Radiolarites from the Upper Cretaceous can be found in the Zagros Mountains and in the Troodos Mountains on Cyprus (Campanian). The radiolarites of Northwestern Syria are very similar to the occurrences on Cyprus and probably have the same age. Red radiolarian clays associated with manganese nodules are reported from Borneo, Roti, Seram and Western Timor.

=== Cenozoic ===
A good example for Cenozoic radiolarites are radiolarian clays from Barbados found within the Oceanic Group. The group was deposited in the time range Early Eocene till Middle Miocene on oceanic crust which is subducting now under the island arc of the Lesser Antilles. Younger radiolarites are not known – probably because younger radiolarian oozes did not have sufficient time to consolidate.

== Use ==
Radiolarite is a very hard rock and therefore was extensively used in prehistoric technology and has been called the "iron of the Paleolithic". Axes, blades, drills and scrapers were manufactured from it. The cutting edges of these tools, however, are somewhat less sharp than flint. Radiolarite was also quarried for road metal in the early days on the Central California coast.
