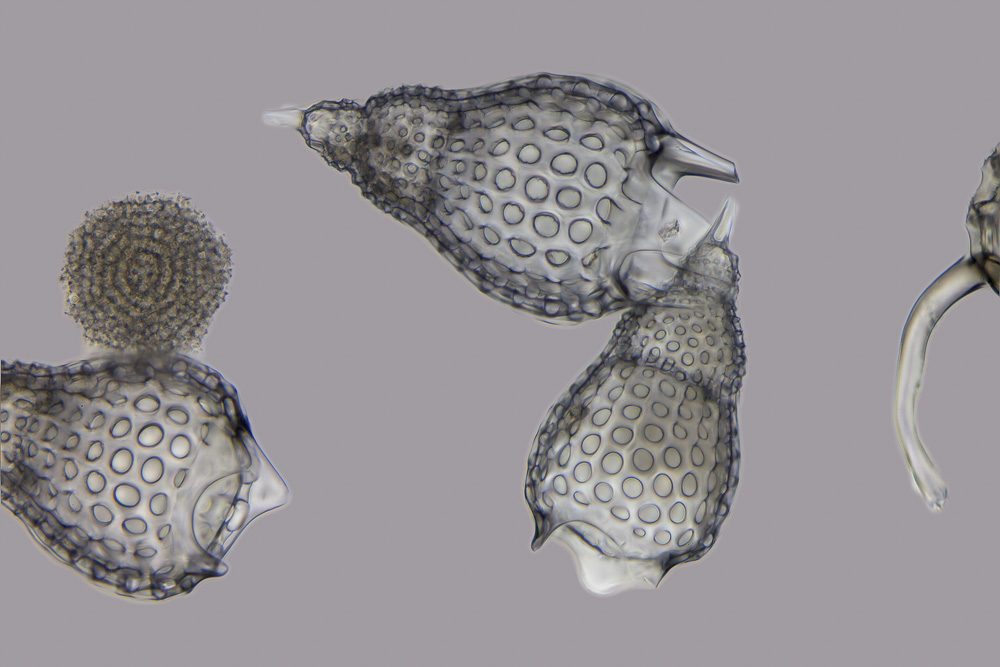

Scientific classification
- Domain: Eukaryota
- Clade: Sar
- Clade: Rhizaria
- Phylum: Retaria
- Class: Polycystina
- Order: Nassellaria
- Family: Theoperidae; Haeckel, 1881 emend. Riedel, 1967

Synonyms
- Eucyrtidiidae Ehrenberg, 1847

= Theoperidae =

Family of single-celled organisms

Theoperidae is a family of radiolarians in the order Nassellaria.

== Genera ==
Artopilium — Artostrobus — Bathropyramis — Calocyclas — Clathrocyclas — Conarachnium — Conicavus — Cornutella — Corocalyptra — Cycladophora — Cyrtolagena — Cyrtopera — Dictyocephalus — Dictyoceras — Dictyocodon — Dictyophimus — Eucecryphalus — Eucyrtidium — Gondwanaria — Lipmanella — Litharachnium — Lithocampe — Lithomitra — Lithopera — Lithopilium — Lithostrobus — Lophocorys — Lophocyrtis — Peripyramis — Perypiramis — Phrenocodon — Plectopyramis — Pterocanium — Pterocyrtidium — Sethoconus — Stichocorys — Stichopera — Stichopilidium — Theocalyptra — Theocorys — Theopilium
