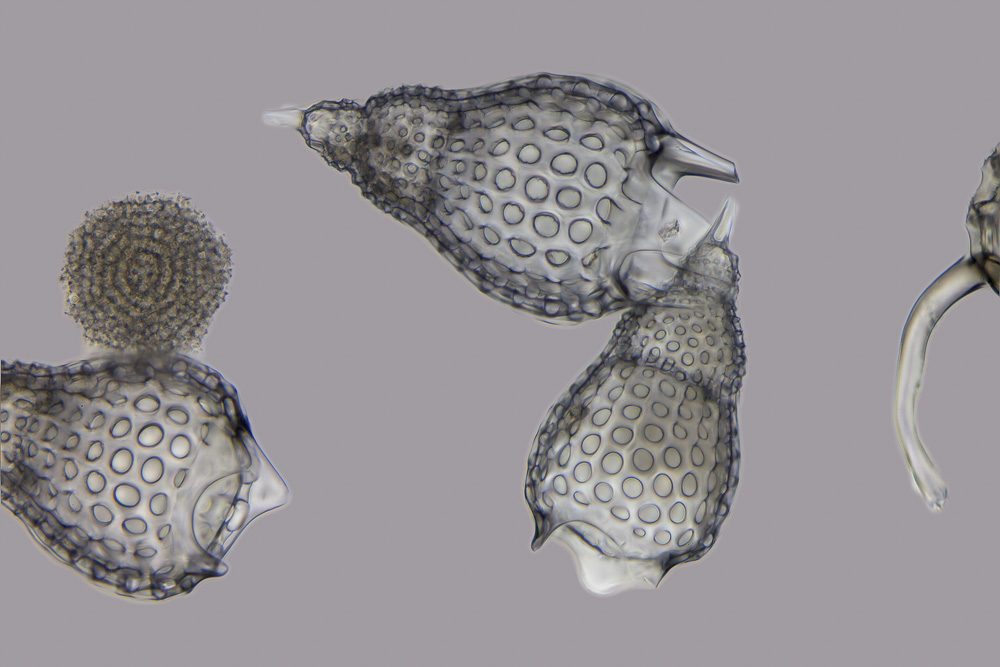

Scientific classification
- Domain: Eukaryota
- Clade: Sar
- Clade: Rhizaria
- Phylum: Retaria
- Class: Polycystina
- Order: Nassellaria; Ehrenberg, 1875

Families
- Archiphormididae; Artostrobiidae; Cannobotryidae; Carpocaniidae; Collozoidae; Plagiacanthidae; Pterocorythidae; Theoperidae; Trissocyclidae

= Nassellaria =

Order of single-celled organisms

Nassellaria is an order of Rhizaria belonging to the class Radiolaria. The organisms of this order are characterized by a skeleton cross link with a cone or ring.

== Introduction ==
Nassellaria is an order of Radiolaria under the class Polycystina. These organisms are unicellular eukaryotic heterotrophic plankton typically with a siliceous cone-shaped skeleton. The most common group of radiolarians are the polycystine radiolarians, which are divided into two subgroups: the spumellarians and the nassellarians. Both spumellarians and nassellarians are common chert-forming microfossils and are important in stratigraphical dating, as the oldest radiolarians are Precambrian in age. The nassellarians appear in the fossil record much later than their other polycystine relatives, the spumellarians. spumellarians can be seen as far back as the Precambrian, whereas nassellarians do not begin to appear until the Carboniferous. Nassellarians are believed to have been increasing in species diversity since the beginning of the Cenozoic.

Nassellarians have been and continue to be some of the most remarkable and aesthetically interesting protists both alive and in the fossil record. They occupy an important role ecologically and have done so since the Precambrian. There is still much we do not know about these protists, and discovering more will require the continued interdisciplinary effort of many scientists.

== Morphology ==
The holotype morphology of the Nassellarian order as described by Anderson and Boltovsky et al. is of an egg-shaped central capsule (the part of the cell containing one or more nuclei, Golgi bodies, mitochondria, lysosomes, and other bodies important for cellular function) located within a porous conical skeleton made of silica. The central capsule is typically located toward the apical end of the skeleton. The basal end is usually in the shape of a hollow circle, giving the skeleton a conical look. Surrounding the central capsule, but still inside of the skeleton, is the extracapsulum. This material is primarily alveoli, gas-filled bubble-like structures that regulate the buoyancy of the organism. The alveoli are connected by a web of rhizopodia throughout the extracapsulum. Fusules connect the intracapsulum (central capsule) to the extracapsulum. Axopodia and additional fusules extend out of the basal opening and through the pores in the skeleton. These will act as feeding apparatuses for the nassellarian.

skeletons

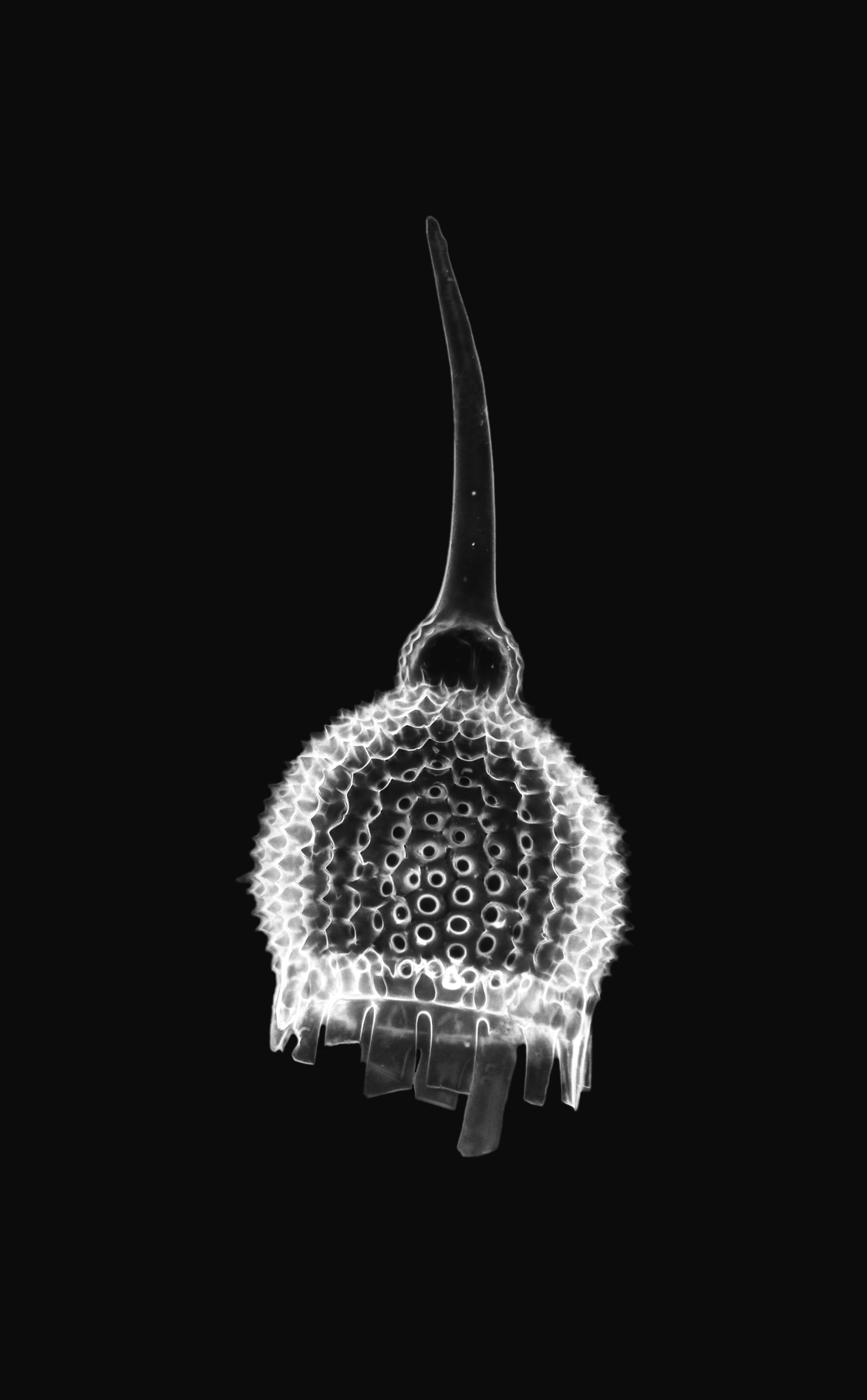
Anthocyrtium hispidum

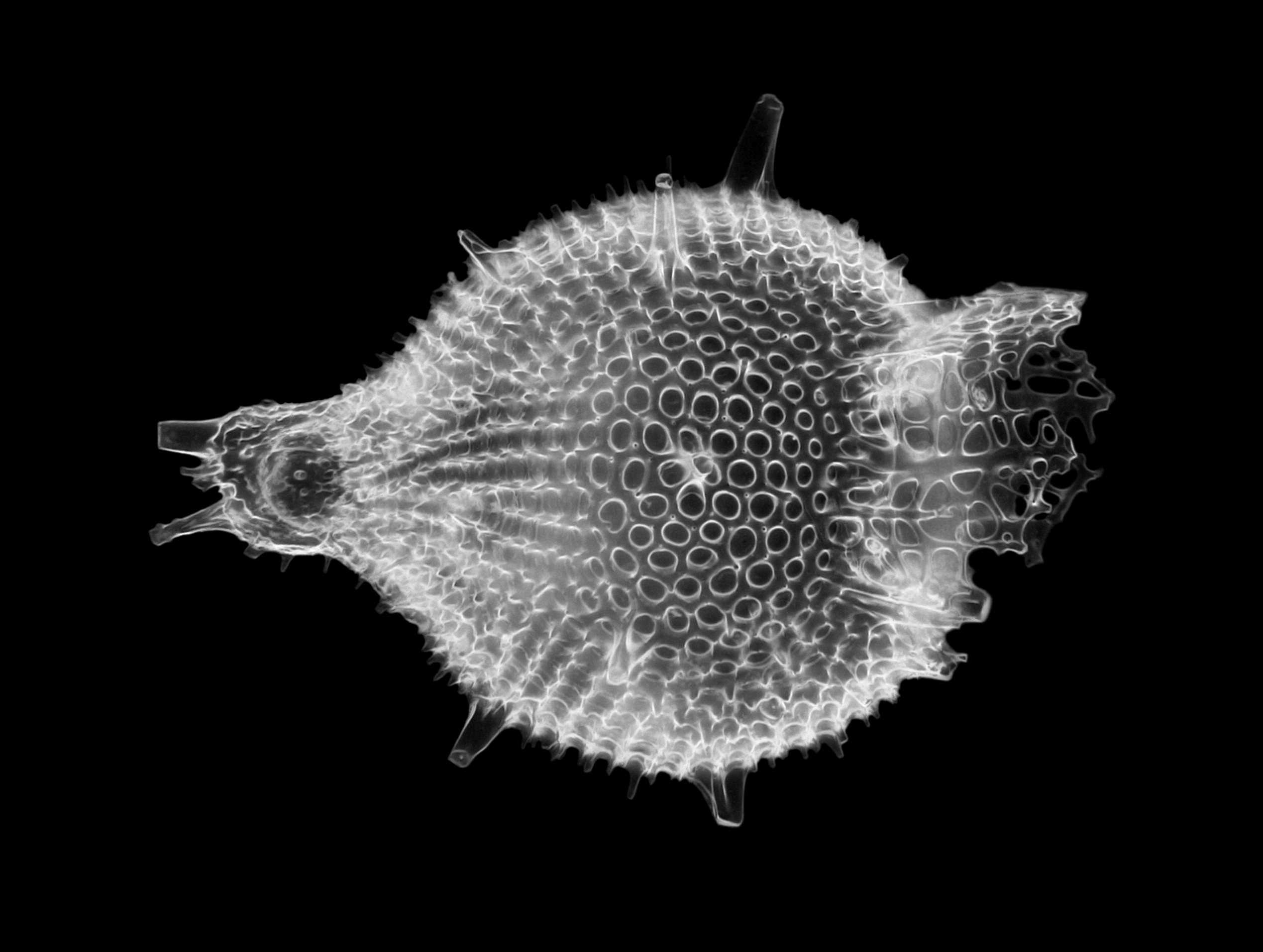
Anthocyrtis grossularia

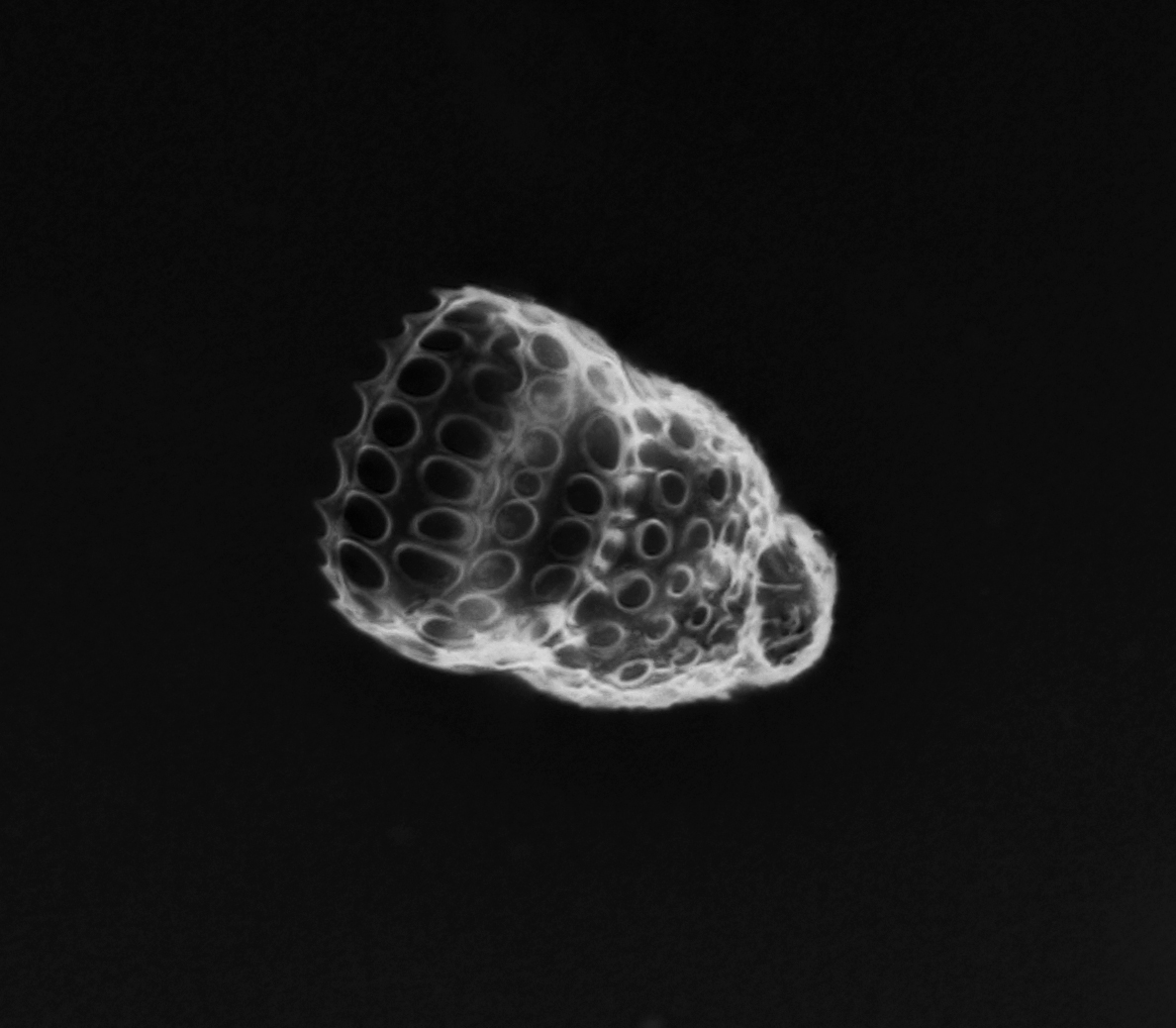
Artostrobus sp.

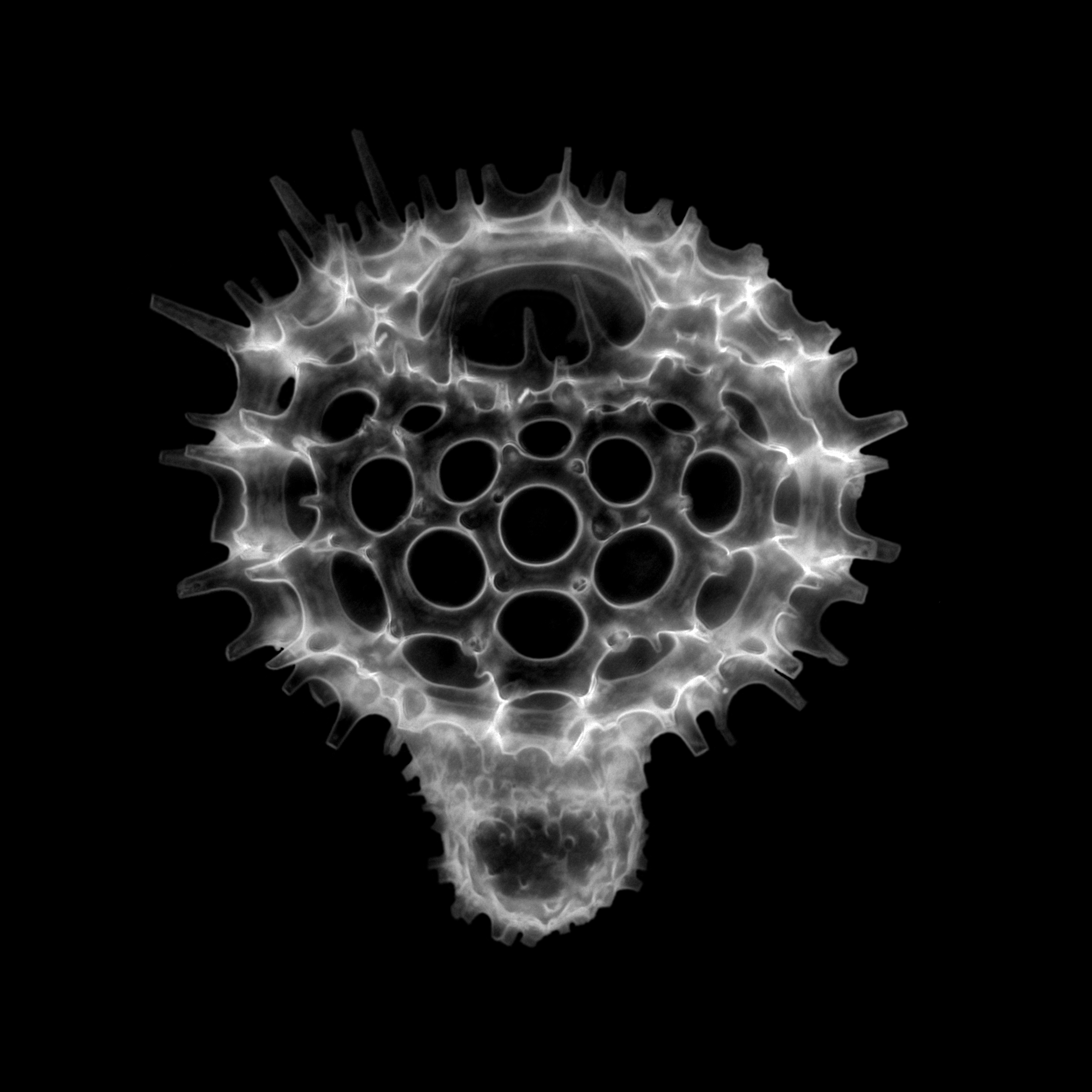
Calocycloma sp.

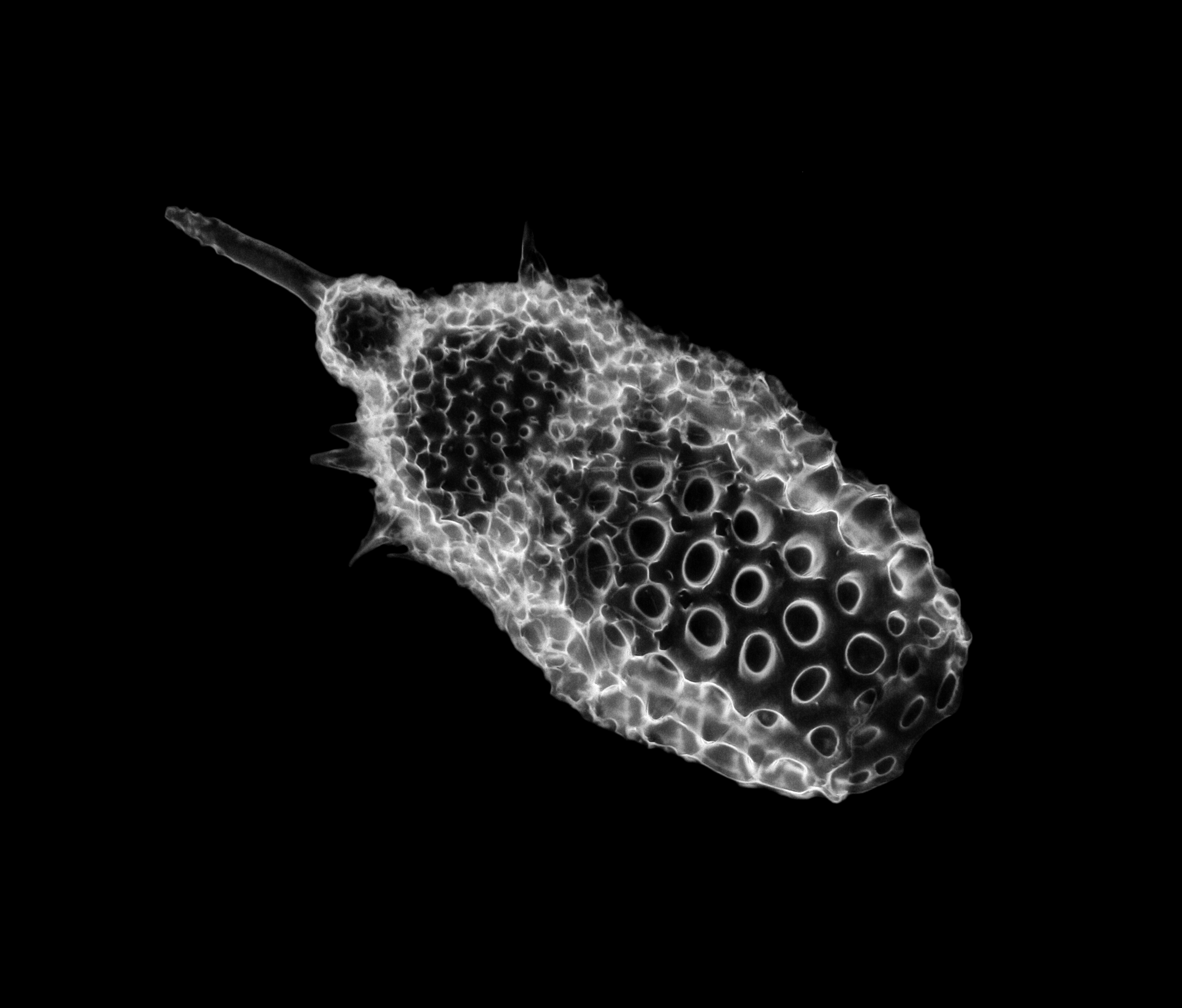
Calocyclas sp.

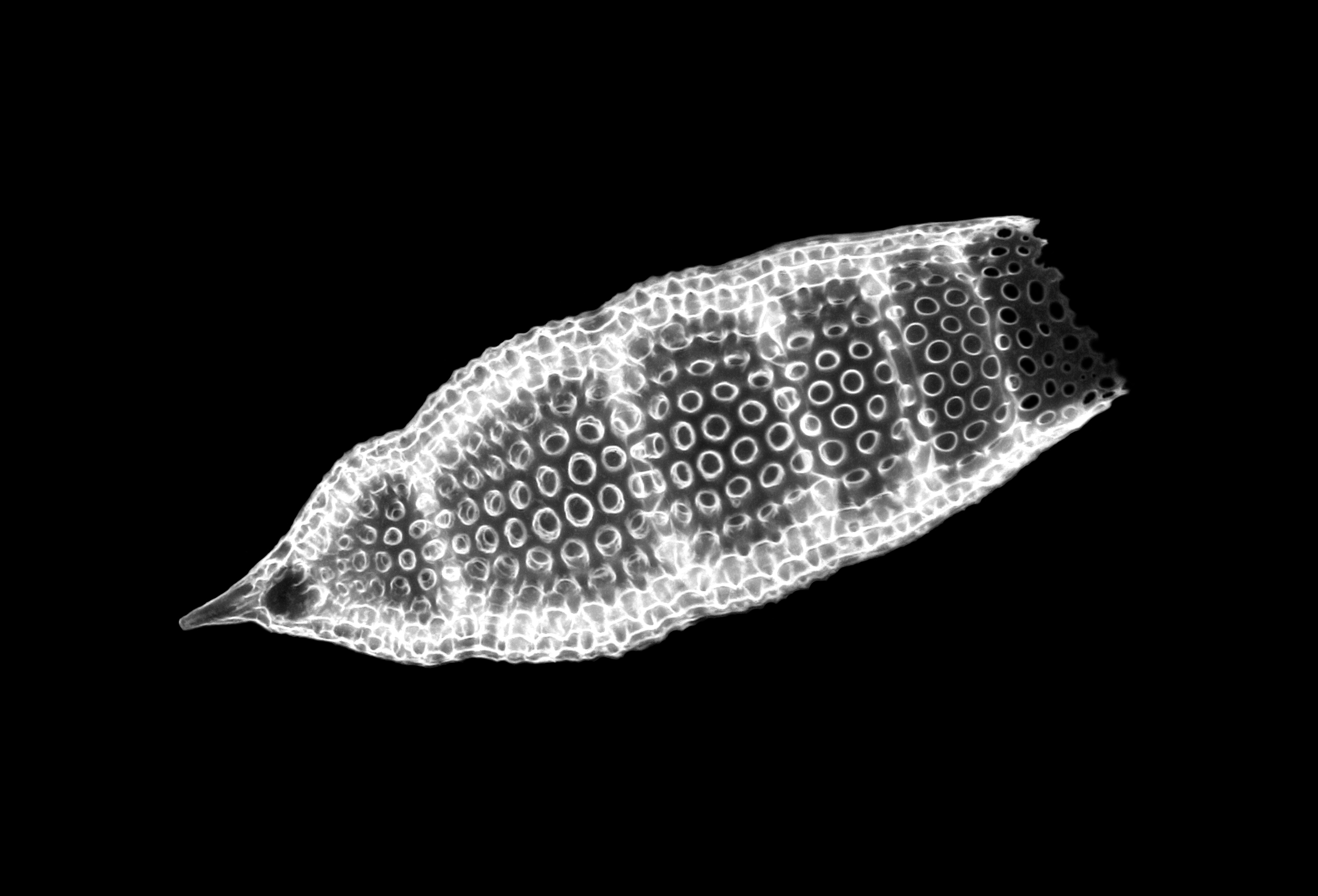
Eucyrtidium sp.

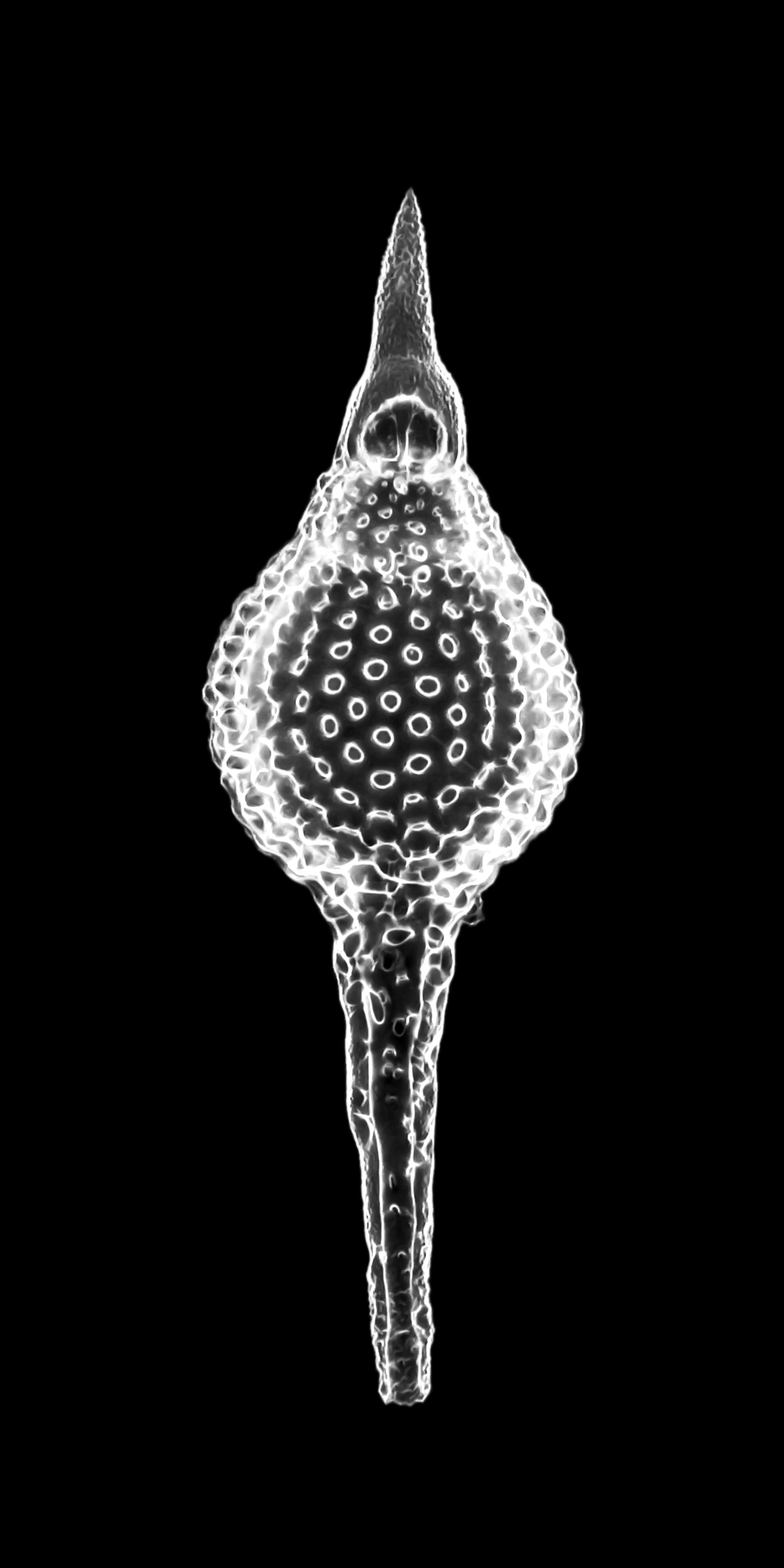
Eusyringium sipho

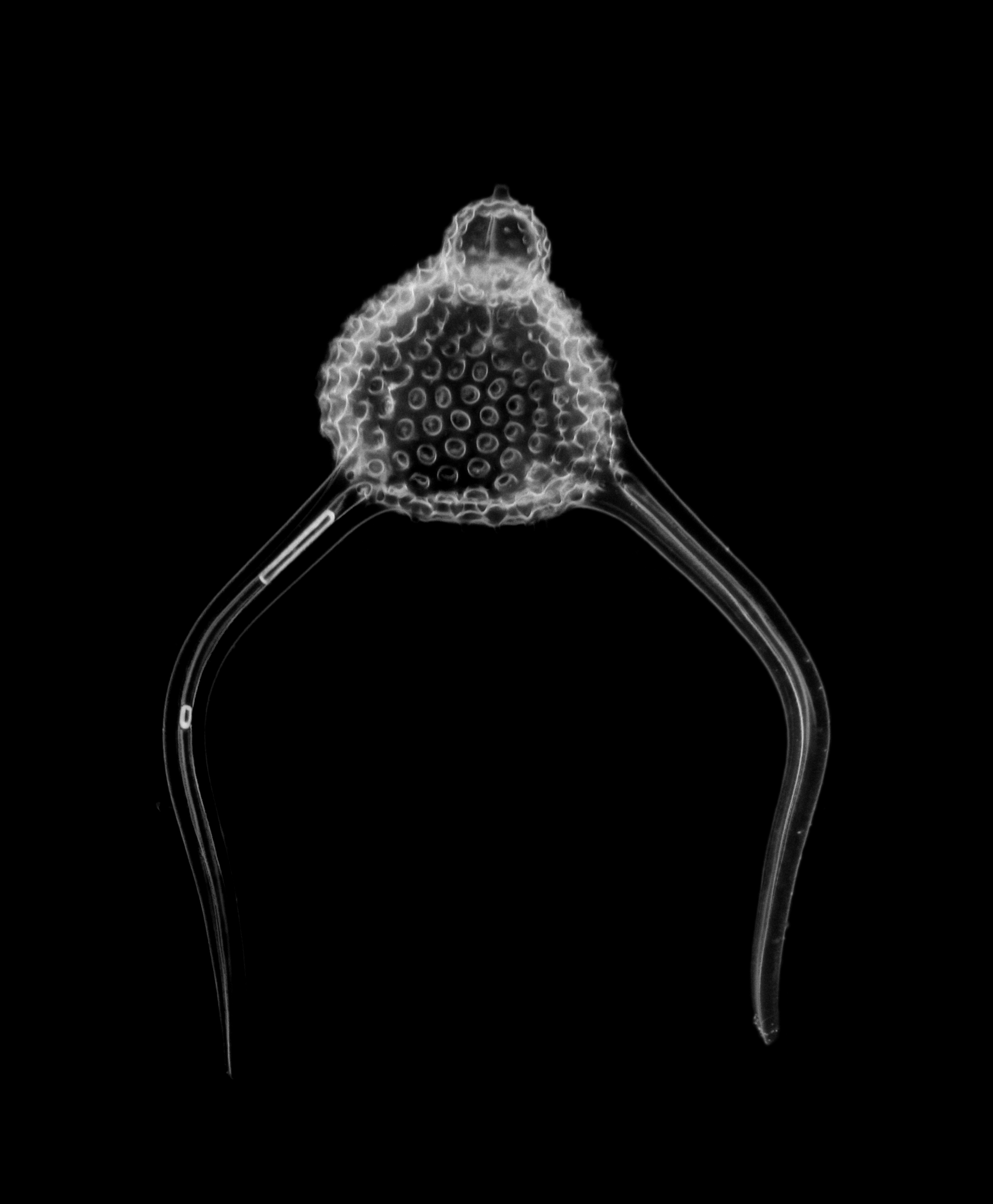
Lychnocanoma sp.
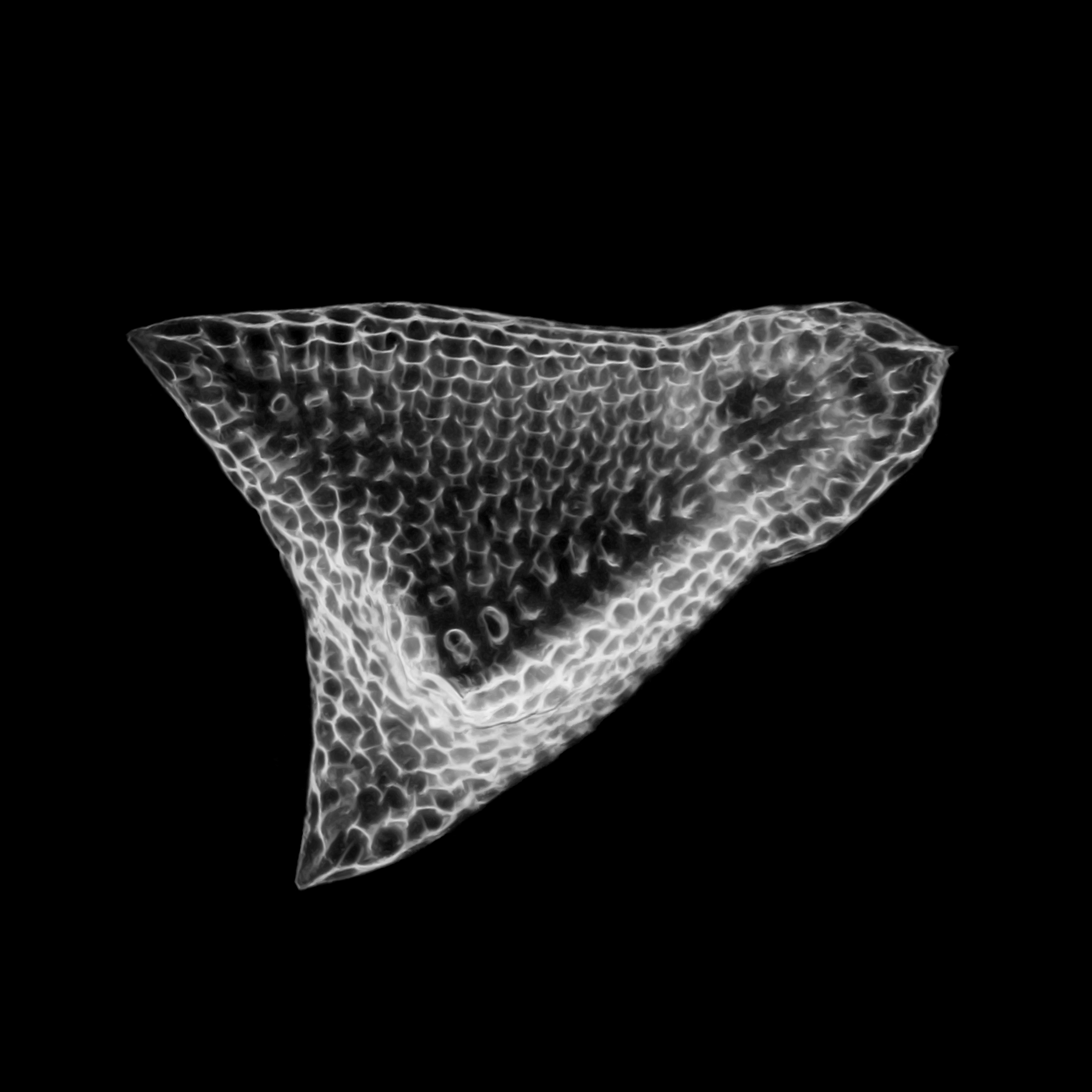
Lithochytris pyramidalis

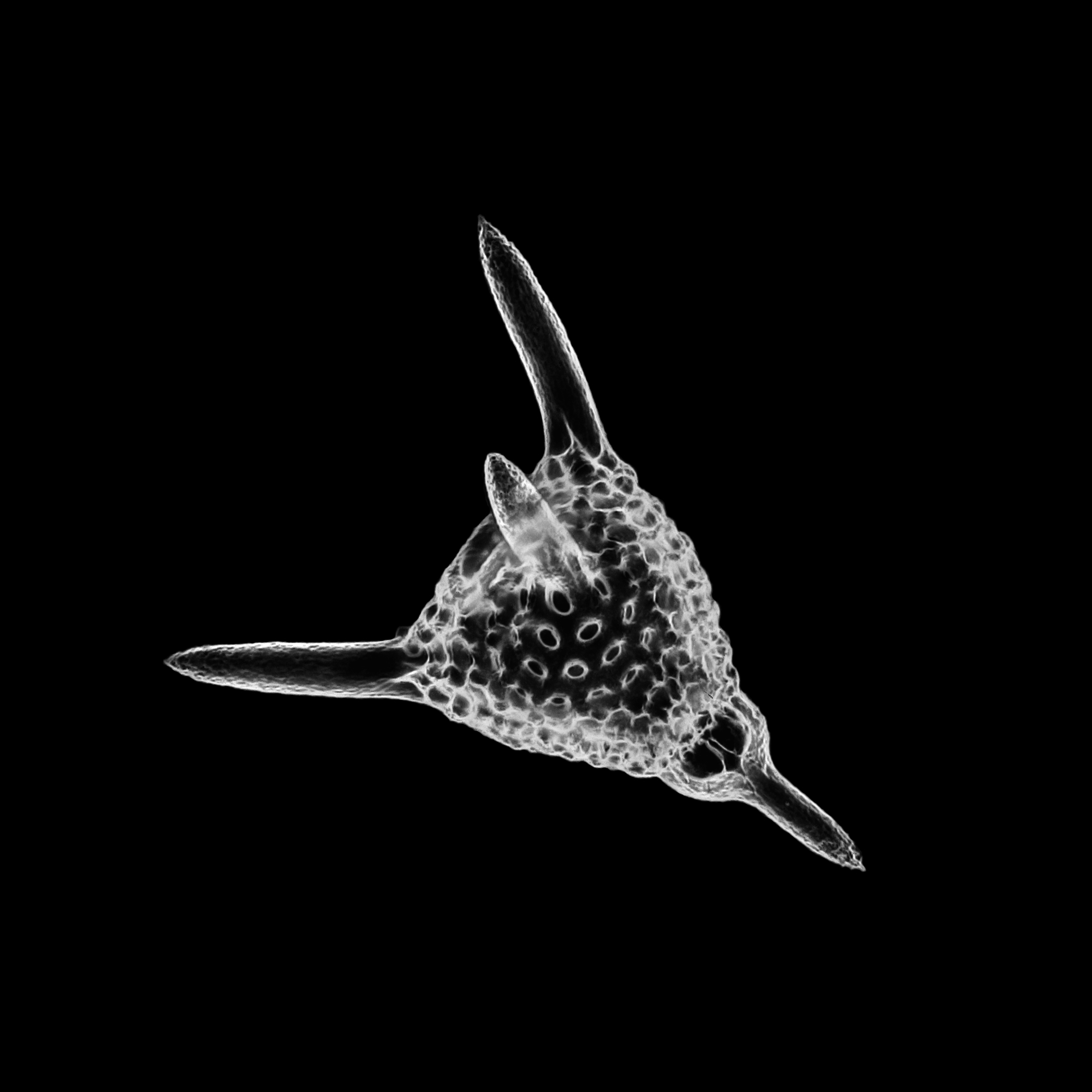
Lychnocanium ventricosum

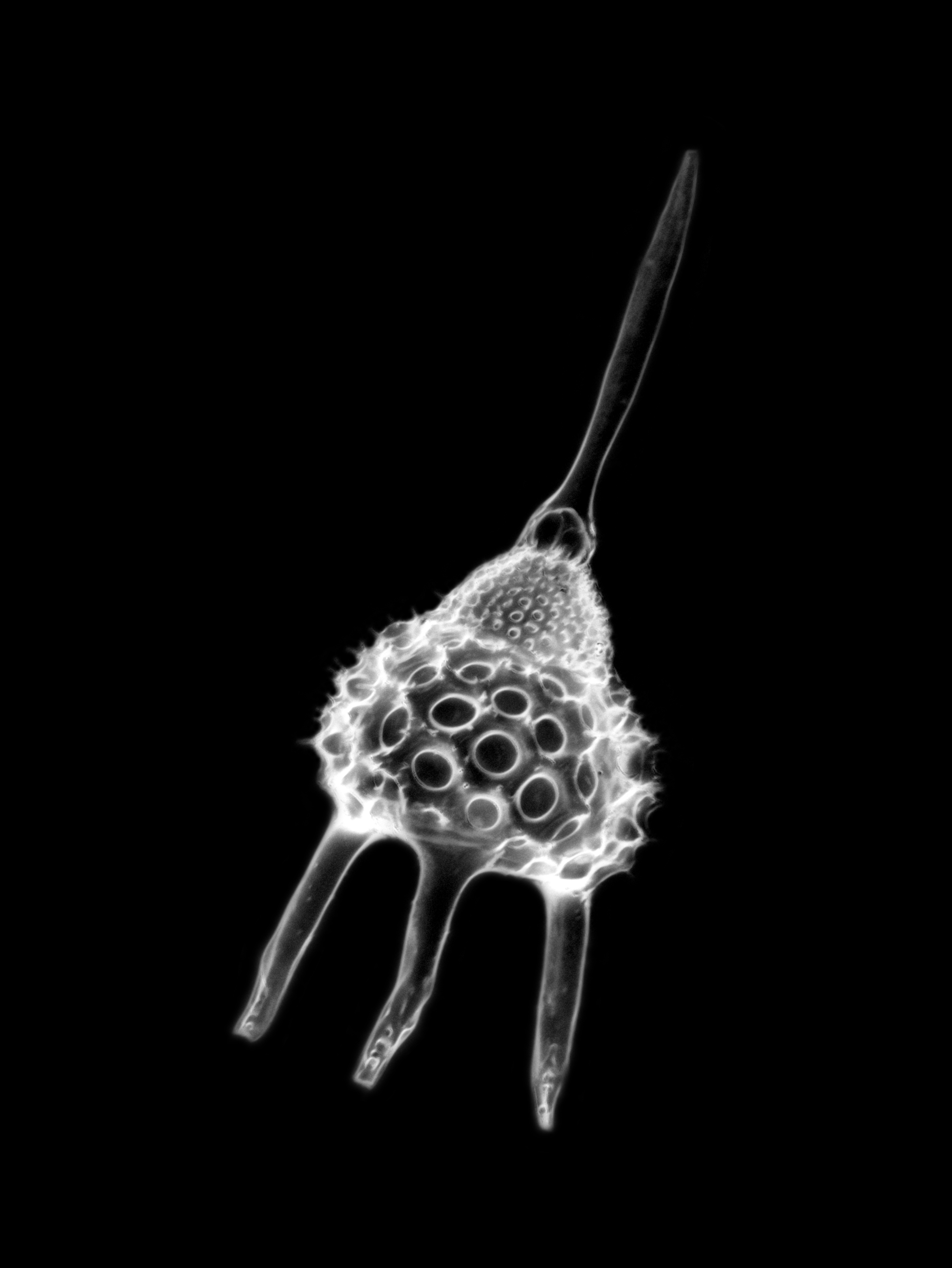
Podocyrtis princeps

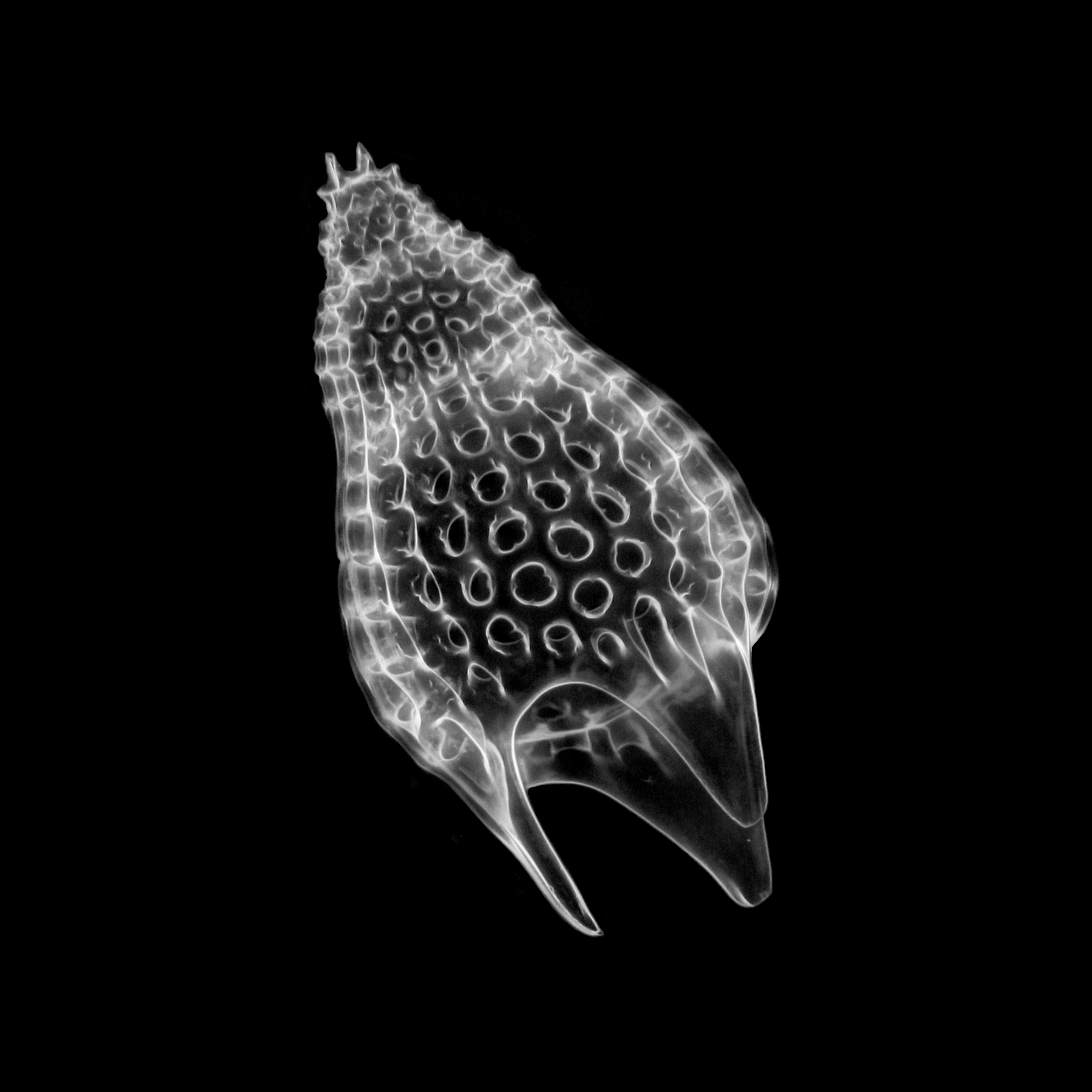
Podocyrtis mitra

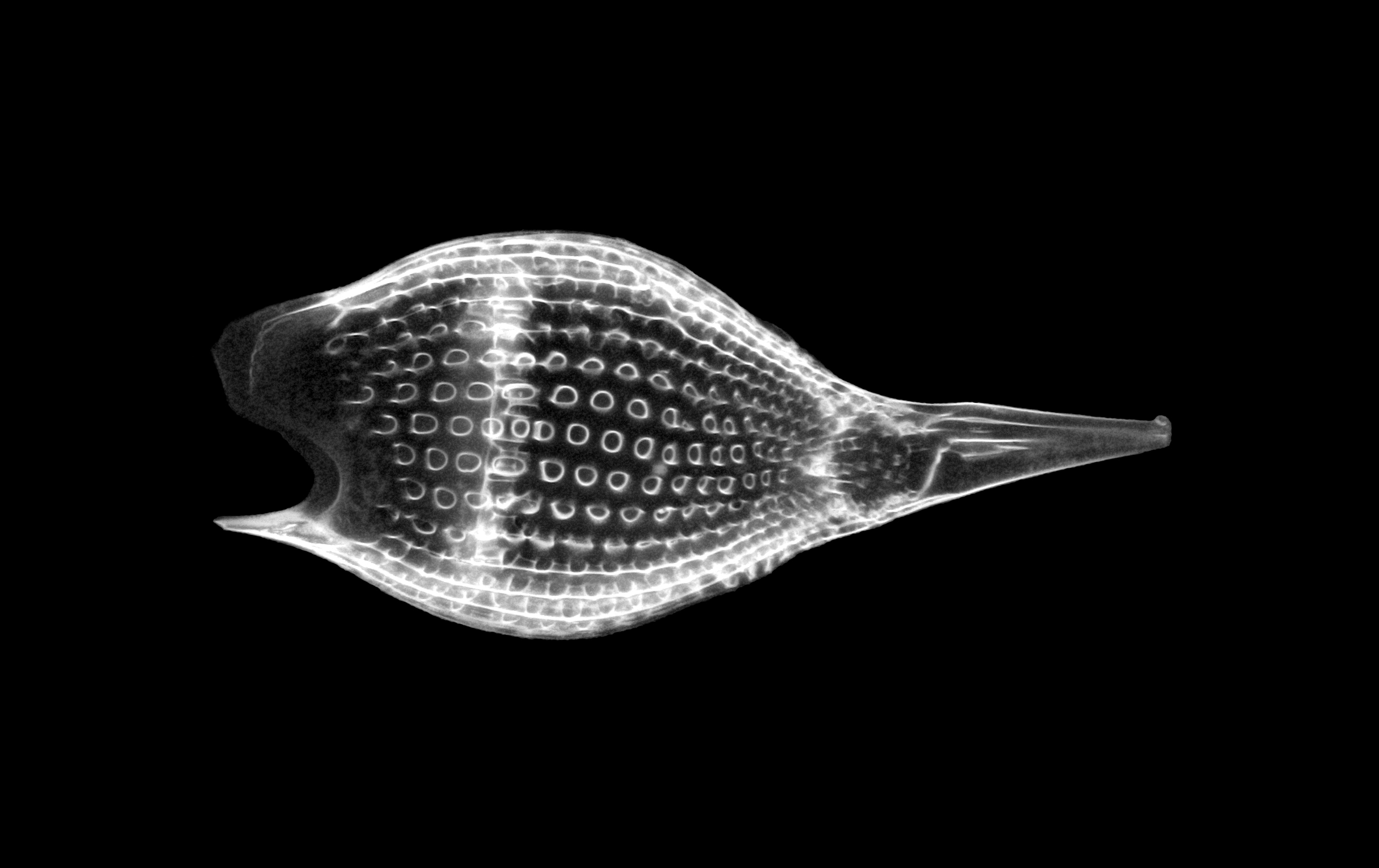
Podocyrtis papalis

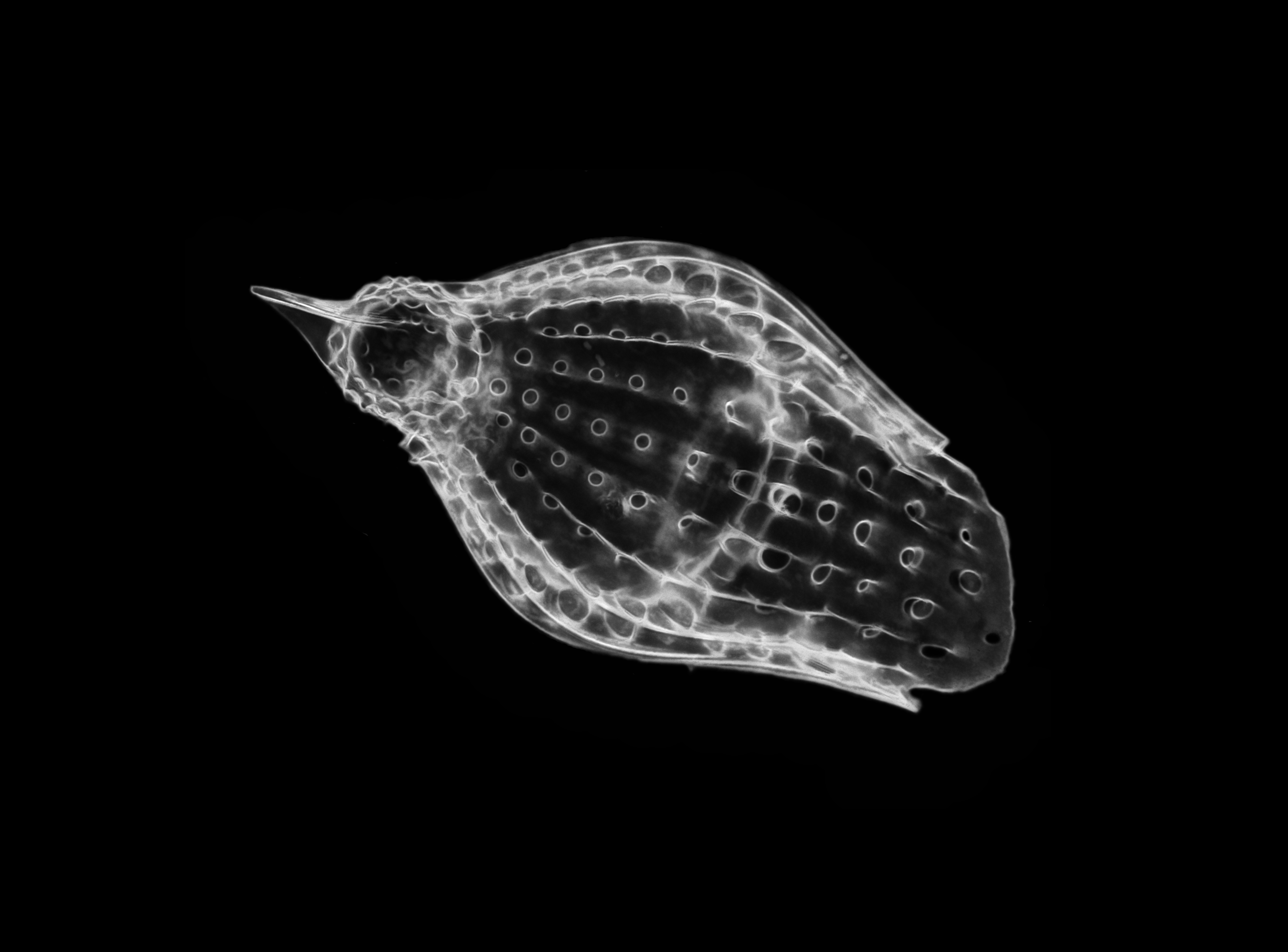
Podocyrtis papalis

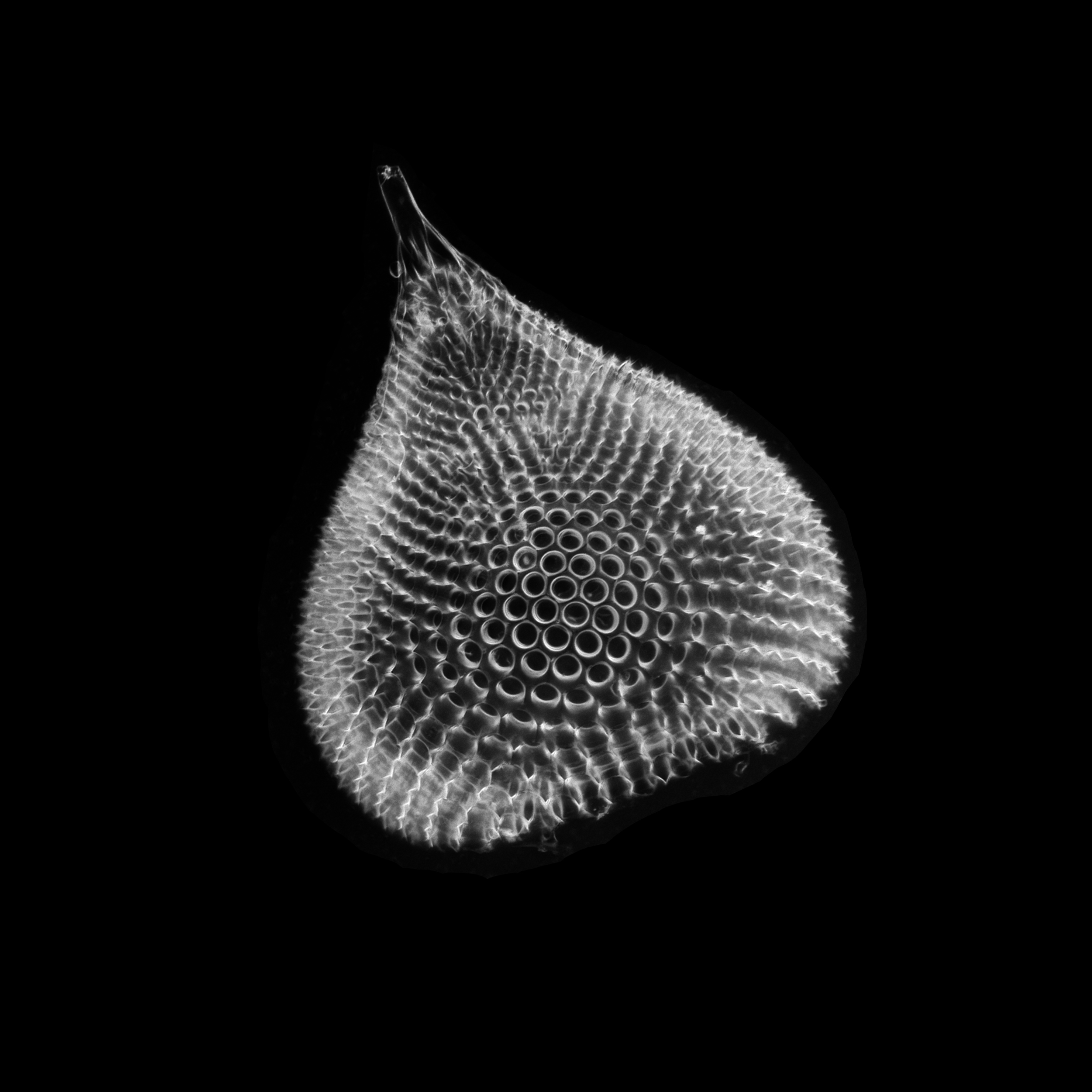
Theocotylissa ficus sp.

There exist three basic types of nassellarian skeletons. The first is formed from the connection of three elongate spicules at a central point. The three spicules are arranged in a single plane so that they are 120 degrees apart from each other. This is typically referred to as a “tripod” structure. The second skeleton type common in nassellarians is the aforementioned conical, porous skeleton. The third type is of a ring surrounding a latticed shell. These three skeleton types can be mixed and matched to create seven skeleton categories in nassellarians. Even the simplest classifications of nassellarian morphology is complicated because of the wide variety of morphologies in the nassellarian order even when compared with their sister group, the spumellarians. The innate nature of the nassellarian geometry lends itself to diversity, which may be one of the factors leading to the rapid diversification of the nassellarians in comparison to the spumellarians during the Cenozoic.

Many nassellarians are segmented, meaning there are circular skeletal divisions that exist equatorially along the skeletal cone. These divisions are called strictures. The strictures divide the organism into segments, typically giving it a more bulbous shape. Some nassellarians also exhibit spines from the apical end or along the lateral sides of the cone. Spines along the basal aperture of the organism are called feet.

== Ecology ==
Many nassellarians house dinoflagellate symbionts within their tests. The nassellarian provides ammonium and carbon dioxide for the dinoflagellate, while the dinoflagellate provides the nassellarian with a mucous membrane useful for hunting and protection against harmful invaders. There is evidence from small subunit ribosomal DNA analysis of these dinoflagellate symbionts that dinoflagellate symbiosis with radiolarians evolved independently of other dinoflagellate symbioses (e.g. foraminifera). Small subunit ribosomal DNA analysis also shows evidence that no coevolution of the dinoflagellates and radiolarians has occurred.

Nassellarian feeding is mainly done through extension of pseudopodia out of the basal opening. The axial projection is a very long pseudopodium that extend out of the basal aperture and is surrounded by shorter terminal projections which form a terminal cone around the axial projection. The feeding in segmented Nassellarians is done in three phases: 1) extension, 2) capture, and 3) retraction. The geometry of nasselarians is quite beneficial for this feeding mechanism, as food passes through the basal aperture, which is much larger than the pores in the rest of the skeleton, which is how most spumellarians must transport food.

A second variety of nassellarians feed without using an axial projection at all. These organisms instead form a wide terminal cone, which they cast out behind them from the basal aperture like a fishing net. The three phases of feeding used by segmented nassellarians are also evident in these nassellarians. These “fishing net” nassellarians are much easier to see feeding in the wild and present quite a spectacular sight.

Nassellarians feed on other plankton such as small algae, bacteria, diatoms, and small zooplankton.

== Fossil History ==
Early Paleozoic radiolarian fossil history is dominated by Spumellaria until the Carboniferous period, during which nassellarian fauna experienced a sharp increase in diversity. Nassellarian and spumellarian diversities have been relatively similar since the Mesozoic, with drops in diversity after mass extinction events and a rise in both spumellarian and nassellarian diversity during the Quaternary.

Symbioses between algae and radiolarians is observed frequently in extant species, but the evolution and timing of this symbiosis is currently unknown, as the symbiotic algae do not leave behind hard skeletons to fossilize. It may be possible to answer this question using isotopic analysis, as algal symbionts preferentially uptake carbon-12, so symbiont-bearing calcareous organisms such as Foraminifera become enriched in carbon-13 compared to non symbiont-bearing calcareous organisms. If fossil evidence can be gathered for isotopic ratio analysis, the time window for appearance of algal symbionts with nassellarians and/or spumellarians should be able to be restricted in geologic time.
