= Turlock Lake Formation =

Early Pleistocene geologic formation in California, United States

- Stratigraphic range: Early Pleistocene
- Type: Geologic formation
- Underlies: Riverbank Formation
- Overlies: Mehrten Formation, North Merced Pediment and Gravels

Lithology
- Primary: Granitic sand over stratified silt

Location
- Region: Sacramento County, California
- Country: United States

The Turlock Lake Formation is an Early Pleistocene geologic formation in the Sierra Nevada foothills in Sacramento County, California. Cities in/over the formation's area include Citrus Heights, Carmichael, and Roseville.

The Turlock Lake Formation is a fan deposit of dominantly granitic alluvium covering the westward extension of the North Merced Pediment and Gravels formation, and directly overlying the Mehrten Formation.

It preserves Early Pleistocene Quaternary period fossils.

== See also ==
- List of fossiliferous stratigraphic units in California
- Paleontology in California
