= Santa Cruz Mudstone =

Geologic formation in California, U.S.

- Stratigraphic range: Tortonian-Messinian
- Type: Formation
- Underlies: Purisima Formation
- Overlies: Santa Margarita Sandstone
- Thickness: >2,700 m (8,900 ft)

Lithology
- Primary: Siliceous organic mudstone

Location
- Coordinates: 37.1°N 122.3°W
- Approximate paleocoordinates: 36.6°N 119.8°W
- Region: California
- Country: United States
- Extent: Santa Cruz Mountains

Type section
- Named for: Santa Cruz County
- Santa Cruz Mudstone (California)

The Santa Cruz Mudstone is a geologic formation in California. The siliceous organic mudstones of the formation were deposited in deep water and fluvial environments. The formation overlies the Santa Margarita Sandstone and is overlain by the Purisima Formation. The Santa Cruz Mudstone was formerly considered part of the Monterey Formation. The formation preserves bivalve and echinoid fossils as well as vertebrates of Parabalaenoptera baulinensis and Otodus megalodon. The formation dates back to the Late Miocene (Tortonian to Messinian) period.

== See also ==
- List of fossiliferous stratigraphic units in California
- Paleontology in California
