= St. George Formation =

Geologic formation in California, United States

- Stratigraphic range: Pliocene
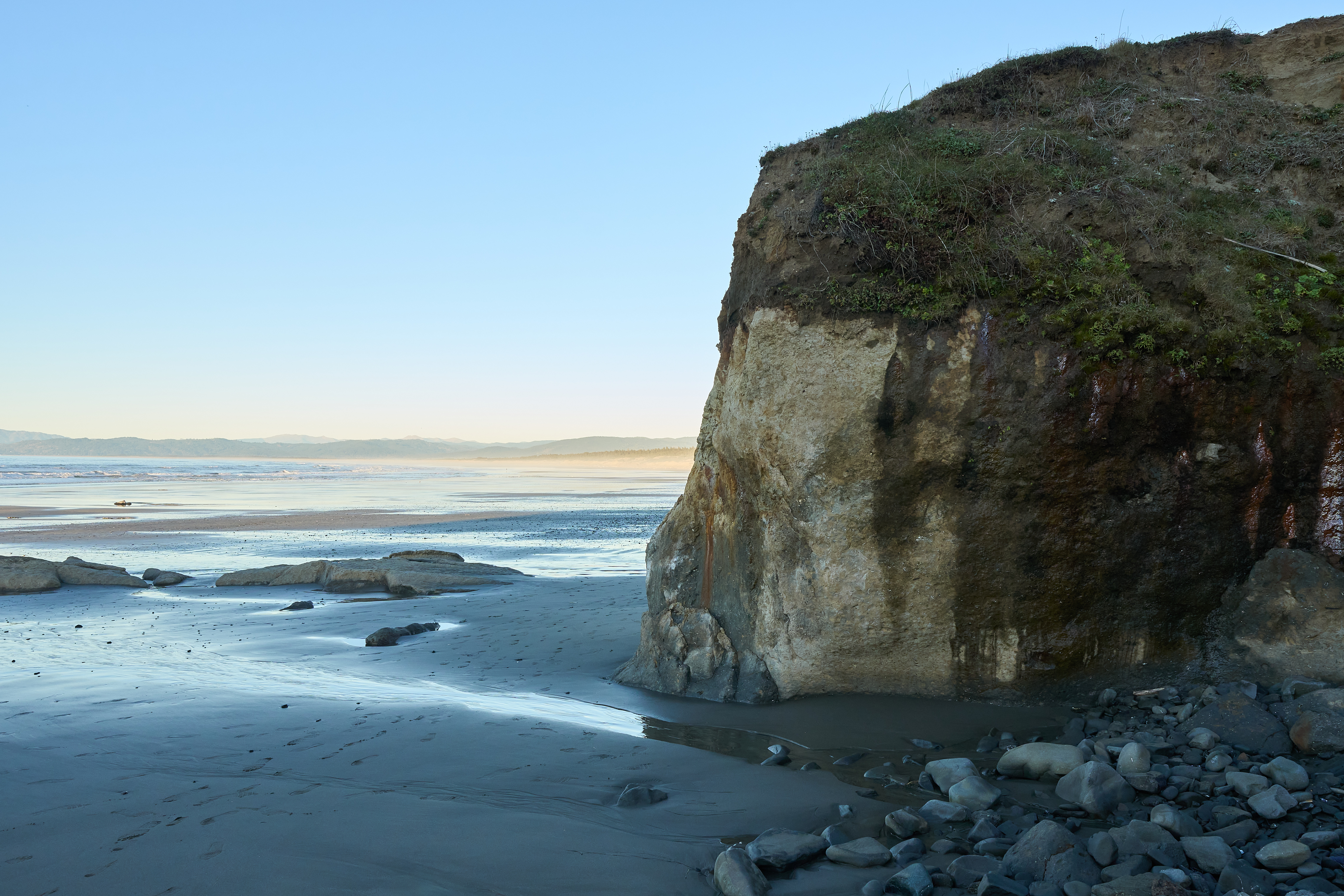
- Exposure at Point St. George, California
- Type: Formation
- Underlies: Battery Formation
- Overlies: Dothan Formation

Location
- Region: California
- Country: United States

The St. George Formation is a geologic formation in California. It preserves fossils dating back to the Pliocene period, including carbonized petrified wood.

This formation is relatively rare, with the only known exposures occurring on the north side of Point St. George and at nearby Pebble beach, both west of Crescent City, California.

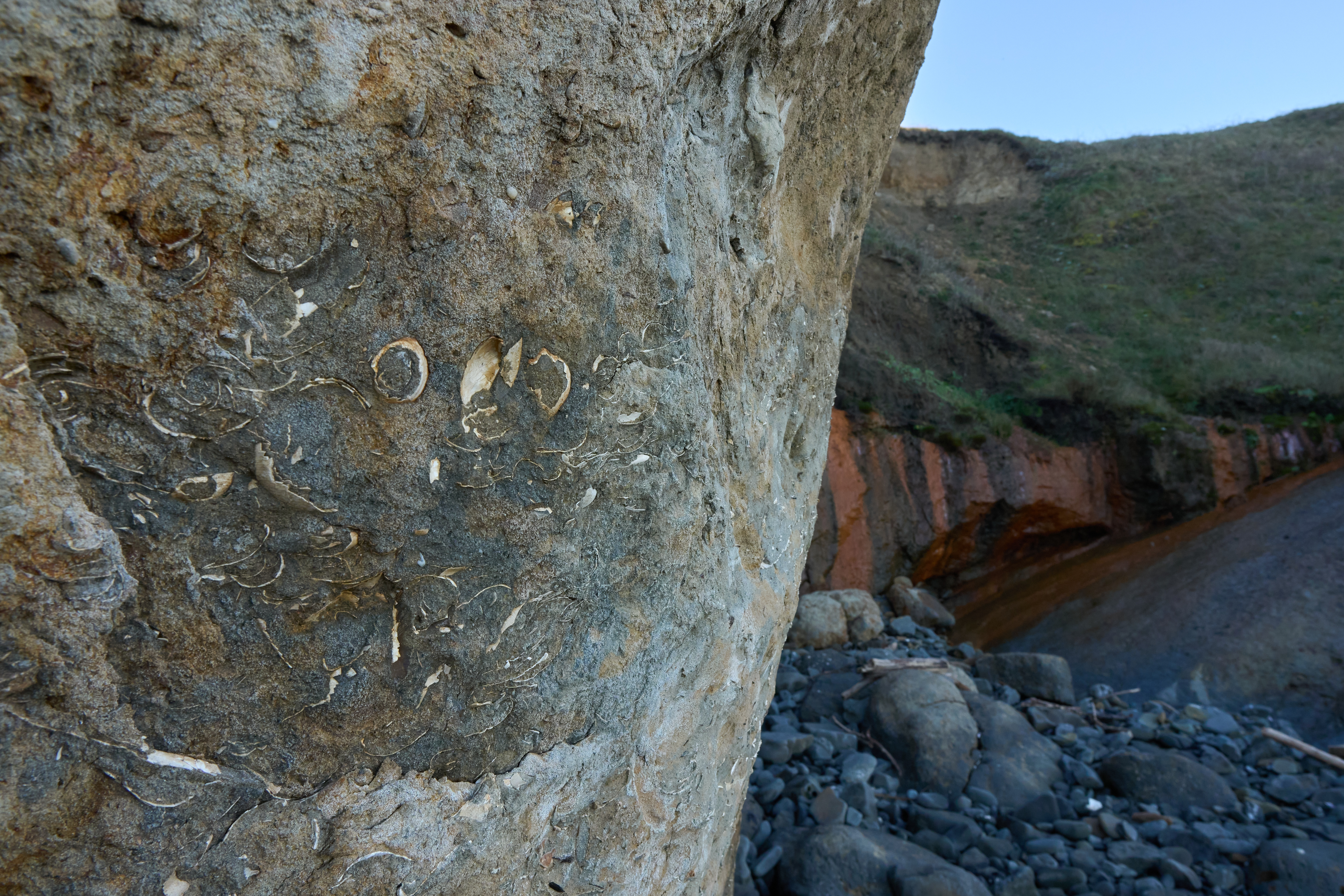
Fossil mollusc shells in formation

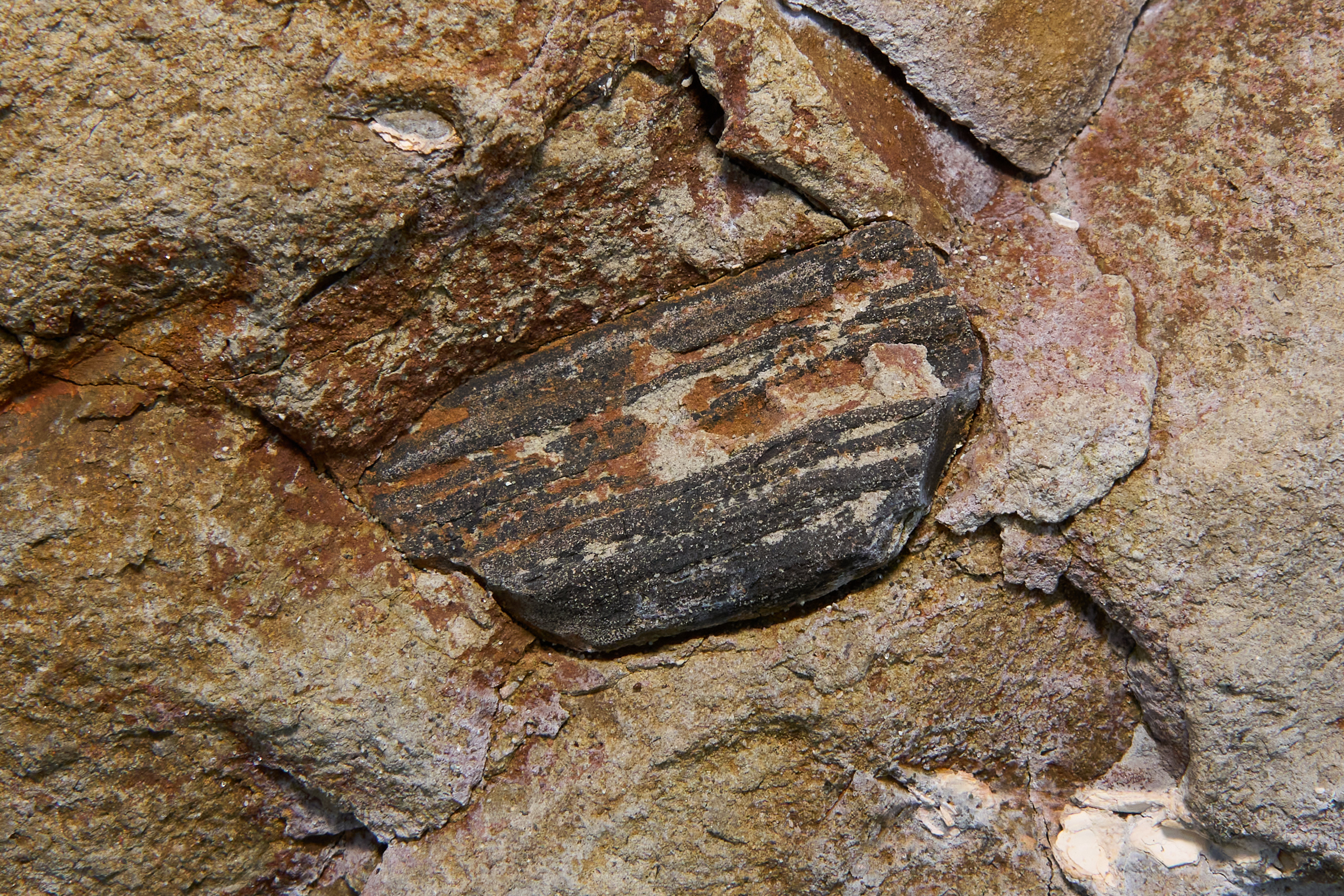
Petrified wood in formation

== See also ==
- List of fossiliferous stratigraphic units in California
- Paleontology in California
