= Payton Ranch Limestone =

Geologic formation in California, United States

- Stratigraphic range: Silurian
- Type: Formation

Location
- Region: California
- Country: United States

The Payton Ranch Limestone is a geologic formation in the Klamath Mountains province (geology) of Northwestern California.

It preserves fossils dating back to the Silurian period of the Paleozoic Era.

It is a Limestone Member of the Silurian Gazelle Formation.

== See also ==
- List of fossiliferous stratigraphic units in California
- Paleontology in California
- Paleozoic California
- Silurian stratigraphic units of North America
