= Santa Susana Formation =

Geologic formation in California, United States

- Stratigraphic range: Late Paleocene-Early Eocene
- Type: Formation
- Underlies: Meganos Formation
- Overlies: Martinez Formation
- Thickness: 1,000–1,500 ft (300–460 m)

Lithology
- Primary: Shale
- Other: Sandstone, conglomerate

Location
- Region: Los Angeles County and Ventura County, California
- Country: United States
- Extent: Simi Hills, Santa Susana Mountains

Type section
- Named for: Santa Susana, California

The Santa Susana Formation is a Paleogene period geologic formation in the Simi Hills and western Santa Susana Mountains of southern California.

The formation consists largely of light-gray shale and some fine-grained shaly sandstone, with a lens of heavy conglomerates in the lower part. Small beds of limestone are also present. It is from 1,000 to 1,500 feet (300 to 460 m) thick.

== Fossil content ==
The Santa Susana Formation preserves fossils from the Late Paleocene to Early Eocene epochs in the Paleogene period of the Cenozoic Era. Fossilized fauna in the Santa Susana Formation is entirely different from that of underlying Martinez Formation, and has very little in common with that of the overlying Meganos Formation.

== See also ==
- Geology of Los Angeles County, California
- List of fossiliferous stratigraphic units in California
- Paleogene California
- Paleontology in California
