= 1964 in paleontology =

Paleontology or palaeontology is the study of prehistoric life forms on Earth through the examination of plant and animal fossils. This includes the study of body fossils, tracks (ichnites), burrows, cast-off parts, fossilised feces (coprolites), palynomorphs and chemical residues. Because humans have encountered fossils for millennia, paleontology has a long history both before and after becoming formalized as a science. This article records significant discoveries and events related to paleontology that occurred or were published in the year 1964.

== Arthropods ==
=== Newly named insects ===
Name	Novelty	Status	Authors	Age	Unit	Location	Notes	Images
Poneropsis hypolitha	Comb nov	Syn	(Cockerell)	Late Eocene	Bembridge Marls	UK	A Dolichoderin ant jr synonym of Emplastus hypolithus	Emplastus hypolithus

== Mollusca ==
=== Newly named bivalves ===
Name	Novelty	Status	Authors	Age	Location	Notes	Images
Similodonta.	Gen et sp nov	Valid	Soot-Reyn	Middle Ordovician to Middle Silurian		New genus and species with five other species moved from other genera	

== Archosauromorphs ==
=== Dinosaurs ===
Taxon	Novelty	Status	Author(s)	Age	Unit	Location	Notes	Images
Chilantaisaurus tashuikouensis	Gen. et sp. nov.	Valid	Hu	Turonian	Ulansuhai Formation	China	A member of Neovenatoridae	
Eustreptospondylus oxoniensis	Gen. et sp. nov.	Valid	Walker	Callovian	Oxford Clay Formation	England	A megalosaurid	
Eustreptospondylus divesensis	Sp. nov.	Valid	Walker	Callovian	Marnes de Dives	France	Later given the genus Piveteausaurus	
Fabrosaurus australis	Gen. et sp. nov.	Nomen dubium.	Ginsburg	Sinemurian	Upper Elliot Formation	Lesotho	An early ornithischian	
Lambeosaurus paucidens	Comb. nov.	Nomen dubium	Ostrom	Campanian	Judith River Formation	Montana	A new combination for Hadrosaurus paucidens, which may be a ceratopsian	
Metriacanthosaurus	Gen. nov.	Valid	Walker	Oxfordian	Oxford Clay Formation	England	A new species for Megalosaurus parkeri	

=== Newly named birds ===
Name	Novelty	Status	Authors	Age	Unit	Location	Notes	Images
Agriocharis progenes	Sp. nov.	Valid	Brodkorb	Blancan		USA	A Meleagridae.	
Anabernicula oregonensis	Sp. nov.	Valid	Howard	Middle Pleistocene	Fossil Lake	USA (Oregon)	An Anatidae.	
Asio priscus	Sp. nov.	Valid	Howard	Late Pleistocene	Santa Rosa Island Formation	USA (California)	A Strigidae.	
Nettion greeni	Sp. nov.	jr synonym	Brodkorb	Early Pliocene	Ash Hollow Formation	USA (Nebraska)	An Anatidae, transferred to Anas greeni.	
Tympanonesiotes	Gen et Sp. nov.	jr synonym?	Hopson	Early Miocene	Hawthorne Formation	USA (Florida and Georgia (U.S. state)	A Pseudodontornithidae, type species T. wetmorei, transferred tentatively to Pelagornis wetmorei	

=== Pterosaurs ===
==== New taxa ====
Name	Status	Authors	Location	Notes	Images
Dsungaripterus	Valid	Young	China; Mongolia; Korea	A Crested Shellfish-eating Pterosaur.	
Germanodactylus	Valid	Yang	Germany; UK	The German Finger.	

== Plesiosaurs ==
=== New taxa ===
Name	Status	Authors	Notes
Strongylokrotaphus	junior synonym	Novozhilov	junior synonym of Pliosaurus

== Other animals ==
=== Other newly named animals ===
Name	Novelty	Status	Authors	Age	Unit	Location	Notes	Images
Beorn	Gen et Sp. nov.	Valid	Cooper	Late Cretaceous (Campanian)		Canada	A tardigrade; originally placed in its own family (Beornidae), it was later reclassified as a member of the Hypsibiidae.	Beorn
