= List of fossiliferous stratigraphic units in California =

This article contains a list of fossil-bearing stratigraphic units in the state of California, U.S.

== Sites ==
Group or Formation	Period	Notes
Al Rose Formation	Ordovician	
Altamira Shale	Neogene	
Antelope Valley Limestone	Ordovician	
Arvison Formation	Triassic	
Asuncion Group/Chico Formation	Cretaceous	
Asuncion Group/Forbes Shale	Cretaceous	
Asuncion Group/Funks Shale	Cretaceous	
Asuncion Group/Moreno Formation	Cretaceous	
Asuncion Group/Ragged Valley Shale	Cretaceous	
Avawatz Formation	Neogene	
Aztec Sandstone	Jurassic	
Badger Flat Formation	Ordovician	
Baird Formation	Carboniferous	
Barrel Spring Formation	Ordovician	
Barstow Formation	Neogene	
Battery Formation		
Bautista Formation		
Bedrock Spring Formation	Neogene	
Bird Spring Formation	Permian, Carboniferous	
Bonanza King Formation	Cambrian	
Bopesta Formation	Neogene	
Bragdon Formation	Carboniferous	
Branch Canyon Formation	Neogene	
Brawley Formation		
Briones Formation	Neogene	
Brock Shale	Triassic	
Budden Canyon Formation	Cretaceous	
Cache Formation		
Cajon Valley Beds Formation	Neogene	
Caliente Formation	Neogene	
Campito Formation	Cambrian	
Capay Formation	Paleogene	
Capistrano Formation	Neogene	
Carrara Formation	Cambrian	
Chanac Formation	Neogene	
Chatsworth Formation	Cretaceous	
Chico Formation	Cretaceous	
Chico Group/Moreno Formation	Cretaceous	
Chloropagus Formation	Neogene	
Conglomerate Mesa Formation	Permian	
Copper Canyon Formation	Neogene	
Coso Formation	Neogene	
Crowder Formation	Neogene	
Darwin Canyon Formation	Permian	
Debris Dam Formation	Cretaceous	
Deep Spring Formation	Cambrian	
Dekkas Formation	Permian	
Delmar Formation	Paleogene	
Diablo Formation	Neogene	
Diligencia Formation		
Disaster Peak Formation	Neogene	
Domengine Formation	Paleogene	
Dove Spring Formation	Neogene	
Drakes Bay Formation	Neogene	
Ely Springs Dolomite	Ordovician	
Etchegoin Formation	Neogene	
Falor Formation		
Fernando Formation	Neogene	
Forbes Formation	Cretaceous	
Foreman Formation	Jurassic	
Franciscan Formation	Jurassic	
Freeman Silt Formation	Neogene	
Friars Formation	Paleogene	
Funks Formation	Cretaceous	
Gazelle Formation	Silurian	
Goler Formation	Paleogene	
Goodhue Formation	Permian	
Goodwin Formation	Ordovician	
Great Valley Formation	Cretaceous	
Great Valley Group/Antelope Shale	Cretaceous	
Great Valley Group/Budden Canyon Formation	Cretaceous	
Great Valley Group/Crack Canyon Formation	Cretaceous	
Great Valley Group/Gravelly Flat Formation	Cretaceous	
Great Valley Group/Lodoga Formation	Cretaceous	
Great Valley Group/Moreno Formation	Cretaceous	
Great Valley Group/Stony Creek Formation	Jurassic	
Green Valley Formation	Neogene	
Gregg Ranch Formation	Ordovician	
Hardgrave Formation	Jurassic	
Harkless Formation	Cambrian	
Harold Formation		
Hector Formation	Neogene	
Hidden Valley Dolomite	Devonian	
Hinchman Formation	Jurassic	
Hookton Formation		
Hornbrook Formation	Cretaceous	
Horned Toad Formation	Neogene	
Horseshoe Gulch Formation	Ordovician	
Horseshoe Gulch unit Formation	Ordovician	
Hosselkus Formation	Triassic	
Hosselkus Limestone	Triassic	
Hungry Valley Formation	Neogene	
Imperial Formation	Neogene	
Imperial Group/Deguynos Formation	Neogene	
Jalama Formation	Cretaceous	
Jewett Sand Formation	Neogene, Paleogene	
Joaquin Formation	Cretaceous	
Josephine Formation	Jurassic	
Juncal Formation	Paleogene	
Kangaroo Creek Formation	Devonian, Silurian, Ordovician	
Kangaroo Ranch Formation	Ordovician	
Kern River Formation	Neogene	
Kern River Beds Formation	Neogene	
Kramer Beds Formation	Neogene	
Kreyenhagen Formation	Paleogene	
Kreyenhagen Shale	Paleogene	
La Habra Formation		
La Jolla Formation	Paleogene	
Ladd Formation	Cretaceous	
Ladera Sandstone	Neogene	
Laguna Seca Formation	Paleogene, Cretaceous	
Lake Mathews Formation	Neogene	
Latham Shale	Cambrian	
Livermore Gravels Formation	Neogene	
Llajas Formation	Paleogene	
Locatelli Formation	Paleogene	
Lodo Formation	Paleogene	
Lomita Marl Formation		
Lompico Sandstone	Neogene	
Lower Arkose Unit Formation	Neogene	
Manix Formation		
Martinez Formation	Paleogene	
Mazourka Formation	Ordovician	
McCloud Limestone	Permian, Carboniferous	
Meganos Formation	Paleogene	
Meganos C Formation	Paleogene	
Mehrten Formation	Neogene	
Merced Formation	Neogene	
Merhten Formation	Neogene	
Mint Canyon Formation	Neogene	
Mission Valley Formation	Paleogene	
Modello Formation	Neogene	
Modelo Formation	Neogene	
Modin Formation	Triassic	
Moenkopi Formation	Triassic	
Monola Formation	Cambrian	
Monterey Formation	Neogene	
Monterey Group/Claremont Shale	Neogene	
Montezuma Formation	Pleistocene	
Montgomery Creek Formation	Paleogene	
Montgomery Limestone	Ordovician	
Moraga Formation	Neogene	
Moreno Formation	Cretaceous	
Moreno Grande Formation	Cretaceous	
Mormon Formation	Jurassic	
MR Caliente Formation	Neogene	
Mt. Eden Formation	Neogene	
Mule Spring Limestone	Cambrian	
Mulholland Formation	Neogene	
Neroly Formation	Neogene	
Niguel Formation	Neogene	
Nosoni Formation	Permian	
NS Caliente Formation	Neogene	
Oclese Sand Formation	Neogene	
Ocotillo Formation		
Ono Formation	Cretaceous	
Orinda Formation	Neogene	
Oro Loma Formation	Neogene	
Osbourne Canyon Formation	Permian	
Otay Formation		
Owens Valley Formation	Permian	
Owens Valley Group/Santa Rosa Flat Formation	Permian	
Pacheco Formation	Cretaceous	
Palm Spring Formation		
Palos Verdes Formation		
Panoche Formation	Cretaceous	
Paskenta Formation	Cretaceous	
Paso Robles Formation	Neogene	
Pauba Formation		
Payton Ranch Limestone	Silurian	
Peace Valley Beds Formation	Neogene	
Petaluma Formation	Neogene	
Pico Formation	Neogene	
Pigeon Point Formation	Cretaceous	
Pinole Tuff Formation	Neogene	
Pismo Formation	Neogene	
Pit Formation	Triassic	
Pleasants Sandstone	Cretaceous	
Plush Ranch Formation	Neogene	
Point Loma Formation	Cretaceous	
Poleta Formation	Cambrian	
Pomerado Conglomerate Formation	Paleogene	
Potem Formation	Jurassic	
Poway Formation	Paleogene	
Puente Formation	Neogene	
Puente Shale	Neogene	
Punchbowl Formation	Neogene	
Purisima Formation	Neogene	
Purisimo Formation	Neogene	
Redding Formation	Cretaceous	
Rincon Formation	Neogene, Paleogene	
Rio Dell Formation		
Riverbank Formation		
Robinson Formation	Permian	
Rosario Formation	Cretaceous	
Rosario Group/Cabrillo Formation	Cretaceous	
Rosario Group/Point Loma Formation	Cretaceous	
Round Mountain Silt Formation	Neogene	
Saline Valley Formation	Cambrian	
San Antonio Formation		
San Benito Gravels		
San Diego Formation	Neogene	
San Emigdio Formation	Paleogene	
San Francisquito Formation	Paleogene, Cretaceous	
San Joaquin Formation	Neogene	
San Lorenzo Formation	Paleogene	
San Lorenzo Group/Pleito Formation	Paleogene	
San Lorenzo Group/San Emigdio Formation	Paleogene	
San Margarita Sandstone	Neogene	
San Mateo Formation	Neogene	
San Pablo Formation	Neogene	
San Pedro Formation		
San Pedro Sand Formation		
San Timoteo Formation		
Santa Clara Formation	Neogene	
Santa Cruz Mudstone Formation	Neogene	
Santa Margarita Formation	Neogene	
Santa Rosa Flat Formation	Permian	
Santa Rosa Island Formation		
Santa Susana Formation	Paleogene	
Santiago Formation	Paleogene	
Scripps Formation	Paleogene	
Sespe Formation	Neogene, Paleogene	
Shasta Formation	Cretaceous	
Sierra Blanca Limestone	Paleogene	
Siesta Formation	Neogene	
Silverado Formation	Paleogene	
Sisquoc Formation	Neogene	
Skooner Gulch Formation	Neogene	
St. George Formation	Neogene	
Stadium Conglomerate Formation	Paleogene	
Sweetwater Formation	Paleogene	
Tassajara Formation	Neogene	
Tecopa Lake Beds Formation		
Tecuya Formation		
Tejon Formation	Paleogene	
Temblor Formation	Neogene, Paleogene	
Temecula Arkose Formation		
Thompson Formation	Jurassic	
Tick Canyon Formation		
Timm's Point Formation		
Titus Canyon Formation	Paleogene	
Topanga Canyon Formation	Neogene	
Towsley Formation	Neogene	
Tulare Formation	Neogene	
Tuna Canyon Formation	Cretaceous	
Turlock Lake Formation		
UDC Caliente Formation	Neogene	
Union Wash Formation	Triassic	
Unnamed Formation	Paleogene	
Upper Caliente Formation	Neogene	
Upper Etchegoin Formation		
Upper Fernando Formation	Neogene	
Upper Mehrten Formation	Neogene	
Valmonte Diatomite Formation	Neogene	
Vaquero Formation	Neogene	
Vaqueros Formation	Neogene, Paleogene	
Vedder Sand	Paleogene	
Volcanopelagic Succession Group/Unit 1 Formation	Jurassic	
Volcanopelagic Succession Group/Unit 2 Formation	Jurassic	
Volcanopelagic Succession Group/Unit 3 Formation	Jurassic	
Waltham Formation	Cretaceous	
Wildcat Formation	Neogene	
Wildcat Group/Rio Dell Formation	Neogene	
Williams Formation	Cretaceous	
Wood Canyon Formation	Cambrian, Ediacaran	
Zabriskie Quartzite Formation	Cambrian	

== See also ==
- Paleontology in California
