= San Benito Gravels =

Geologic formation in California, United States

- Stratigraphic range: Quaternary
- Type: Geologic formation

Location
- Region: San Benito County, California
- Country: United States

Type section
- Named for: Lake San Benito (prehistoric)

The San Benito Gravels is a Quaternary Epoch geologic formation in California.

== Geology ==
The Pleistocene Period Lake San Benito and others were formed in the prehistoric Pajaro River-San Benito River basin. The lakes were along 10 miles (16 km) on each side of the San Andreas Fault, the movements of which were responsible for the formation of those lakes.

The Purisima Formation surrounds the San Benito Gravels, and was a primary source of the silt and gravels deposited in them.

The present day San Benito River cuts a channel through the formation.

=== Fossils ===
The San Benito Gravels formation preserves Cenozoic Era non−marine fossils.

== See also ==
- List of fossiliferous stratigraphic units in California
- Paleontology in California
