= Badger Flat Limestone =

Geologic formation in California, United States

- Stratigraphic range: Ordovician
- Type: Geologic formation
- Unit of: Mazourka Group
- Overlies: Al Rose Formation

Lithology
- Primary: Limestone

Location
- Region: California
- Country: United States

The Badger Flat Limestone is a limestone geologic formation in California.

It preserves fossils dating back to the Ordovician period.

== See also ==
- List of fossiliferous stratigraphic units in California
- Paleontology in California
