= Union Wash Formation =

Geologic formation in Inyo County, California, United States

- Stratigraphic range: Early Triassic
- Type: Formation

Location
- Region: Inyo Mountains, Inyo County, California
- Country: United States

The Union Wash Formation is a geologic formation in the Inyo Mountains, east of Lone Pine in Inyo County, California.

It is of the Early Triassic epoch in the Triassic Period, during the Mesozoic Era.

== Fossils ==
It preserves fossils dating back to the Triassic period. They include Inyoites owenii, from the Meekoceras bed of the formation, and Ammonoids.

The sites are protected within the Southern Inyo Mountains Wilderness of the Inyo National Forest.

== See also ==
- List of fossiliferous stratigraphic units in California
- Paleontology in California
