= Silverado =

Silverado may refer to:

== Places ==
- Silverado, California, United States, an unincorporated community
- Silverado Canyon, Orange County, California, near the above community; associated with Silverado Creek
- Silverado Trail, a scenic route in Napa Valley
- Silverado Park, Long Beach, California, a city park
- Silverado Formation, a geologic formation in California
- Silverado Resort and Spa, Napa County, California
- Silverado, Calgary, Alberta, Canada, a neighborhood
- The Silverado Galaxy, officially named NGC 3370

== Clubs ==
- Silverado Country Club, a private golf club in Napa County, California
- Silverado (gay bar), a gay bar and strip club in Portland, Oregon, United States

== Other uses ==
- Silverado Policy Accelerator, co-founded by Dmitri Alperovitch
- Chevrolet Silverado, a full-size pickup truck
- Silverado (film), a 1985 American western film
- "Silverado", a 1981 single by The Marshall Tucker Band
- Silverado High School (disambiguation)
- Silverado Savings and Loan, a bank involved in the 1980s savings and loan crisis
- Rio Grande Valley Silverados, original name of the Kentucky Mavericks, an American Basketball Association franchise
