= Lake Mathews Formation =

Geologic formation in California, United States

- Stratigraphic range: Neogene
- Type: Formation

Location
- Region: Temescal Mountains, Riverside County, California
- Country: United States

The Lake Mathews Formation is a geologic formation in Riverside County, California.

It is located in the Lake Mathews reservoir area, in the Temescal Mountains.

The sedimentary formation preserves fossils dating back to the Neogene period.

== See also ==
- Neogene California−related topics
- List of fossiliferous stratigraphic units in California
- Paleontology in California
