= Valmonte =

Valmonte may refer to

- Pantaleón Valmonte (1856 – 1896), a capitan municipal of Gapan and a general during the Philippine Revolution against Spain
- Valmonte Diatomite, geologic formation in California
