= Blancan =

North American faunal stage according to the North American Land Mammal Ages chronology

The Blancan North American Stage on the geologic timescale is a North American faunal stage according to the North American Land Mammal Ages chronology (NALMA), usually considered to start in the early-mid Pliocene Epoch and end by the mid-Pleistocene. It is typically set from around 4.9 Ma (million years ago) to 1.8 Ma, an estimated duration of about 3.1 million years. The Blancan is preceded by the Hemphillian and followed by the Irvingtonian NALMA stages. The Blancan is named after the fossil site of Mount Blanco in Crosby County, Texas.

== Global correlation ==
As usually defined, it corresponds to the mid-Zanclean through Piacenzian and Gelasian stages in Europe and Asia. In California, the Blancan roughly corresponds to the mid-Delmontian through Repettian and Venturian to the very early Wheelerian. The Australian contemporary stages are the mid-Cheltenhamian through Kalimnan and Yatalan. In New Zealand, the Opoitian starts at roughly the same time and the Blancan is further coeval with the Waipipian and Mangapanian stages to the early Nukumaruan. Finally, in Japan the Blancan starts coeval with the late Yuian, runs alongside the Totomian and Suchian and ends soon after the start of the Kechienjian.

== Dating issues ==
The start date of the Blancan has not been fully established. A widely-used system based on vole fossils defines the start of the Blancan based on the first appearance of Mimomys, Ogmodontomys, and Ophiomys in North America south of Alaska. Ogmodontomys is first reported from California at around 4.7 ± 0.5 Ma. In Nevada, Mammals typical of the Blancan first appear within magnetostratigraphic chron 3n.3r, around 4.98–4.89 Ma.

There is even stronger disagreement about the end of the Blancan. Some stratigraphers historically conflated the end of the Blancan with the extinction of Borophagus, Hypolagus, Paenemarmota, Plesippus, Nannippus, and Rhynchotherium faunal assemblage between 2.2 and 1.8 Ma. Other paleontologists find continuity of the faunal assemblages well into the Pleistocene, and argue for an end date of 1.2 Ma. This corresponds with the extinction of stegomastodons and related species and the appearance of mammoths in southern North America. The end of the Blancan is often defined by the first appearance of mammoths in North America, around 1.4 Ma.

== Fauna ==
The middle of the Blancan, about 2.7 Ma, is when the land bridge connection between North and South America was reestablished and taxa like sloths and glyptodonts appeared in North America at the height of the Great American Interchange.

=== Notable mammals ===
Artiodactyla – even-toed ungulates

- Platygonus, peccaries

Carnivora – carnivores

- Arctodus, short-faced bear
- Hesperocyoninae, dog-like carnivores
- Borophagus, bone-crushing dogs
- Canis, wolves
- Chasmaporthetes, hyenas
- Smilodon, saber-toothed cat
- Homotherium, saber-toothed cat
- Xenosmilus, saber-toothed cat

Lagomorpha – lagomorphs

- Hypolagus, rabbits

Perissodactyla – odd-toed ungulates

- Nannippus, horses
- Plesippus, horses – may belong into Equus
- Equus giganteus

Proboscidea

- Rhynchotherium, gomphotheres
- Stegomastodon, gomphotheres

Rodentia – rodents

- Paenemarmota, giant marmots

Xenarthra

- Glyptotherium, giant armadillo

=== Notable birds ===
Cathartidae – New World vultures

- Sarcoramphus kernense, Kern Vulture

Charadriiformes

- unknown scolopacid (archaic calidrid or turnstone?)

Falconiformes – diurnal raptors

- Falco sp., a falcon

Passeriformes

- unknown corvid (archaic magpie?)

== Blancan fossil sites ==
From Bell et al. (2004):

- Aguascalientes: lower Cedazo fauna
- Arizona: St. David Formation, 111 Ranch, Artesia Road, Duncan, Country Club, Bear Springs, Pearson Mesa, Verde faunas
- Baja California Sur: Las Tunas fauna
- California: Imperial and Palm Spring formations (Fish Creek-Vallecito Creek sequence), Coso Formation, San Timoteo Badlands, Temecula Arkose
- Colorado: Donnelly Ranch fauna
- Florida: Santa Fe River 1, Haile 15A, MacAsphalt, Inglis 1A, Inglis 1C, De Soto Shell Pit, Haile 16A faunas
- Guanajuato: Rancho Viejo and Rancho El Ocote faunas
- Idaho: Glenn's Ferry Formation (Hagerman, Sand Point, Grand View, and Froman Ferry sequences)
- Kansas: Rexroad Formation, Saw Rock Canyon, Fox Canyon, Rexroad 3, White Rock, Bender, Borchers, Nash, Aries A, Rick Forester, Aries B faunas (Kansas)
- Michoacán: La Goleta fauna
- Nebraska: Sand Draw, Seneca, Sappa faunas
- Nevada: Sunrise Pass Formation (Buckeye Creek, Fish Springs Flat faunas), Panaca Formation (Meadow Valley, White Narrows faunas), Wellington Hills fauna
- New Mexico: Camp Rice Formation, Mesilla Basin Faunules A–B, Belen, lower Tijeras Arroyo, Pajarito, Buckhorn faunas
- Saskatchewan: lower Wellsch Valley sequence
- South Dakota: Java fauna
- Texas: Fort Hancock and Camp Rice formations (Hudspeth fauna), Bramblett and Love formations (Aguila and Red Light faunas), Blanco Formation, Beck Ranch, Cita Canyon faunas
- Washington: Ringold Formation (White Bluffs, Blufftop, Taunton faunas)

== See also ==
- Mount Blanco
