= Bragdon Formation =

Geologic formation in California, United States

- Stratigraphic range: Carboniferous
- Type: Formation

Location
- Region: California
- Country: United States

The Bragdon Formation is a geologic formation in California. It preserves fossils dating back to the Carboniferous period. Its sandstones may be rich in quartz, chert and sedimentary rock fragments, or volcanic rock fragments, or volcanic ash (tuff) containing abundant crystals. Gravelly, loamy brown soils of the Hugo series are commonly developed on Bragdon parent material in the Trinity Lake area.

== See also ==
- List of fossiliferous stratigraphic units in California
- Paleontology in California
