= Pismo Formation =

Geologic formation in California, United States

- Stratigraphic range: Pliocene
- Type: Geological formation
- Sub-units: Squire Member; Belleview Member; Gragg Member; Edna Member; Miguelito Member
- Thickness: Roughly 2 kilometres (1.2 mi)

Location
- Region: California
- Country: United States

The Pismo Formation is a geologic formation in California. It preserves fossils dating back to the Pliocene epoch of the Neogene period.

== See also ==
- List of fossiliferous stratigraphic units in California
- Paleontology in California
