= Forbes Shale =

Geologic formation in the Sacramento Valley, California, USA

- Stratigraphic range: Coniacian; ~89.8–86.3 Ma
- Type: Formation
- Unit of: Asuncion Group
- Underlies: Kione Sands
- Overlies: Funks Shale
- Thickness: 1,300 ft (400 m)

Lithology
- Primary: Shale

Location
- Coordinates: 38.6°N 122.0°W
- Approximate paleocoordinates: 42.8°N 86.5°W
- Region: California
- Country: United States
- Extent: Sacramento Valley
- Forbes Shale (the United States) Forbes Shale (California)

The Forbes Shale is a geologic formation in the Sacramento Valley of northern California, United States. It is found in the Sutter Buttes area of Sutter County, California. It preserves fossils dating back to the Coniacian stage of the Late Cretaceous period.

== Fossil content ==
The following fossils were reported from the formation:

Bivalves

- Cladoceramus undulatoplicatus
- Glycymerita veatchii
- Inoceramus subundatus
- I. Inoceramus vancouverensis
- I. aff. chicoensis
- I. aff. klamathensis
- I. aff. whitneyi
- Parallelodon|Parallelodon (Nanonavis) brewerlanus
- Pseudomelania colusaensis

Gastropods

- Bernaya (Protocypraea) kayei
- Biplica obliqua
- Dentalium (Entalis) whiteavesi
- Pseudomelania colusaensis
- Tessarolax distorta
- Volutoderma californica

Ammonites

- Baculites chicoensis
- B. inornatus
- Desmophyllites diphylloides
- Eupachydiscus arbucklensis
- E. willgreeni
- Eutrephoceras campbelli
- Lytoceras (Gaudryceras) alamedense
- Nowakites dobbinsi
- N. rumseyensis
- Oxybeloceras petrolense
- Parapachydiscus cortinaensis
- Puzosia (Holcodiscoides) gorrilli
- Puzosia (Parapuzosia) arenaica
- Baculites sp.
- Canadoceras sp.
- Hauericeras sp.

== See also ==
- Cretaceous California
- List of fossiliferous stratigraphic units in California
