= Sweetwater Formation =

Geologic formation in California, United States

- Stratigraphic range: Paleogene
- Type: Formation

Location
- Region: California
- Country: United States

The Sweetwater Formation is a geologic formation in California. It preserves fossils from the Late Eocene period. It underlies the Otay Formation, which reserves fossils of the Oligocene to Miocene periods of the Cenozoic Era.

It is located in the Peninsular Ranges province. The formation is composed of the angular-conglomerate, gritstone, sandstone and mudstone facies.

== See also ==
- List of fossiliferous stratigraphic units in California
- Paleontology in California
