= Ladera Sandstone =

Geologic formation in California, United States

- Stratigraphic range: Neogene
- Type: Formation

Location
- Region: California
- Country: United States

The Ladera Sandstone is a geologic formation in California. It preserves fossils dating to the Neogene period.

== See also ==
- List of fossiliferous stratigraphic units in California
- Paleontology in California
