= Lomita Marl =

Geologic formation in Los Angeles County, southern California

- Stratigraphic range: Pleistocene
- Type: Geologic formation

Lithology
- Primary: Marl

Location
- Region: Los Angeles County, Southern California
- Country: United States

Type section
- Named for: Lomita, California

The Lomita Marl is a geologic formation in Los Angeles County, southern California.

It preserves Pleistocene fossils.

== See also ==
- Geology of Los Angeles County, California
- List of fossiliferous stratigraphic units in California
- Paleontology in California
