= Cajon Valley Beds =

Sedimentary geologic formation in California

- Stratigraphic range: Neogene
- Type: Geologic formation

Location
- Region: San Diego County, California
- Country: United States

Type section
- Named for: El Cajon Valley

The Cajon Valley Beds is a sedimentary geologic formation in the El Cajon Valley of southwestern San Diego County, California.

It preserves fossils dating back to the Neogene period of the Cenozoic Era.

== See also ==
- Geology of San Diego County, California
- List of fossiliferous stratigraphic units in California
- Paleontology in California
