= Manix Formation =

Geologic formation in California

- Type: Formation

Location
- Region: California
- Country: United States

The Manix Formation is a geologic formation in California. This formation dates to the Pleistocene Epoch and is known to preserve fossils. Specimens of the extinct camelid, Camelops have been uncovered from the Rancholabrean units of this formation of both the species C. hesternus and C. minidokae.

== See also ==
- List of fossiliferous stratigraphic units in California
- Paleontology in California
