= Funks Shale =

Geologic formation in the Sacramento Valley of northern California

- Stratigraphic range: Cretaceous
- Type: Formation
- Underlies: Forbes Shale

Location
- Region: Sacramento Valley; California
- Country: United States

The Funks Shale is a geologic formation in the Sacramento Valley of northern California.

It is found in the Sutter Buttes area of Sutter County, California.

It preserves fossils dating back to the Cretaceous period.

== See also ==
- Cretaceous California
- List of fossiliferous stratigraphic units in California
- Paleontology in California
