= Seca Formation =

Seca Formation may refer to:

- Seca Formation, Ecuador, a Late Eocene geologic formation in Ecuador
- Seca Formation, Colombia, a Maastrichtian geologic formation in Colombia
- Laguna Seca Formation, a Maastrichtian to Paleocene geologic formation in the United States
