= Potem Formation =

Geologic formation in California

- Stratigraphic range: Jurassic
- Type: Formation

Location
- Region: California
- Country: United States

The Potem Formation is a geologic formation in California. It preserves fossils dating back to the Jurassic period.

== See also ==
- List of fossiliferous stratigraphic units in California
- Paleontology in California
