= Capay Formation =

Geologic formation in California, United States

- Stratigraphic range: Paleogene
- Type: Formation

Location
- Region: Yolo County, California
- Country: United States

The Capay Formation is a geologic formation in Yolo County, western Sacramento Valley, California. It preserves fossils dating back to the Paleogene period.

== See also ==
- List of fossiliferous stratigraphic units in California
- Paleontology in California
