= San Antonio Formation =

Geologic formation in California, U.S.

- Stratigraphic range: Mid-late Pleistocene (Irvingtonian); ~1.8–0.3 Ma
- Type: Formation

Location
- Coordinates: 37.8°N 122.1°W
- Region: Alameda County, California
- Country: United States

The San Antonio Formation is a middle to late Pleistocene (Irvingtonian in the NALMA classification) geologic formation in California. It preserves fossils.

== Fossil content ==
- Equus sp.
- Odocoileus sp.
- Orthodon sp.
- Rana sp.
- Taricha sp.
- Aves indet.
- Colubridae indet.
- Emydinae indet.
- Sciuridae indet.

== See also ==
- List of fossiliferous stratigraphic units in California
- Paleontology in California
