= Goodhue Formation =

Geologic formation in California, United States

- Stratigraphic range: Permian
- Type: Formation

Location
- Region: California
- Country: United States

The Goodhue Formation is a geologic formation in California. It preserves fossils dating back to the Permian period.

== See also ==
- List of fossiliferous stratigraphic units in California
- Paleontology in California
