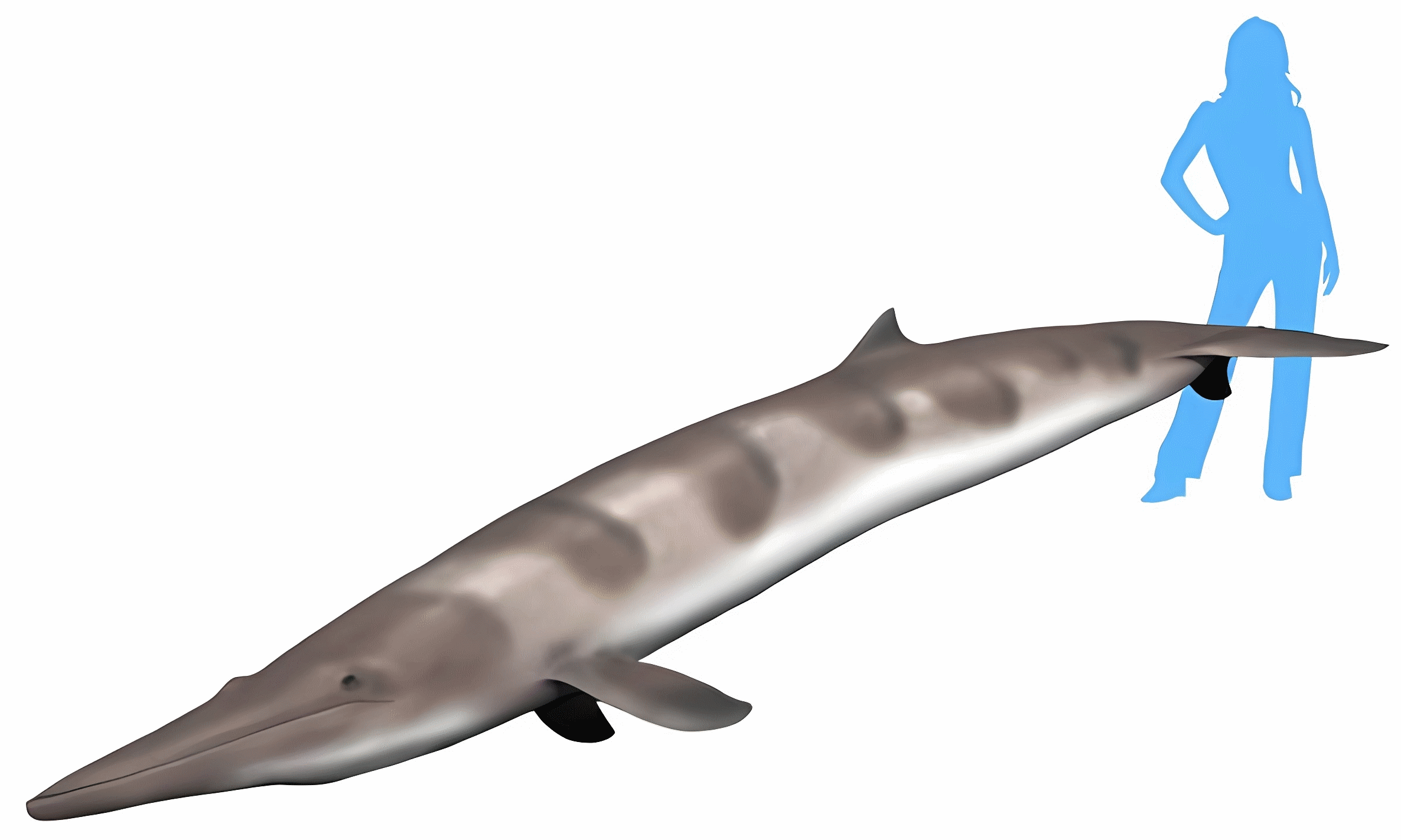
- Herpetocetus bramblei

Scientific classification
- Kingdom: Animalia
- Phylum: Chordata
- Class: Mammalia
- Order: Artiodactyla
- Infraorder: Cetacea
- Family: Cetotheriidae
- Subfamily: †Herpetocetinae
- Genus: †Herpetocetus van Beneden, 1872

Species
- †H. scaldiensis van Beneden, 1872 (type) †H. transatlanticus Whitmore and Barnes, 2008 †H. bramblei Whitmore and Barnes, 2008 †H. morrowi El Adli, Deméré, and Boessenecker, 2014

= Herpetocetus =

Herpetocetus Temporal range: late Miocene–early Pleistocene

Extinct genus of mammals

Herpetocetus is a genus of cetotheriid mysticete in the subfamily Herpetocetinae. Considerably smaller than modern baleen whales, Herpetocetus measured only 3 to 4 meters in length. Additionally, due to the structure of its jaw, it was unable to open its mouth as wide as modern baleen whales, making it incapable of lunge feeding.

== Taxonomy ==
There are four recognized species of Herpetocetus: H. scaldiensis, H. transatlanticus, H. bramblei, and H. morrowi. An additional unnamed species from Japan has been referred to the nomen dubium Mizuhoptera sendaicus in the past, but the undiagnostic nature of the holotype of the latter means that it cannot be confidently referred to M. sendaicus.

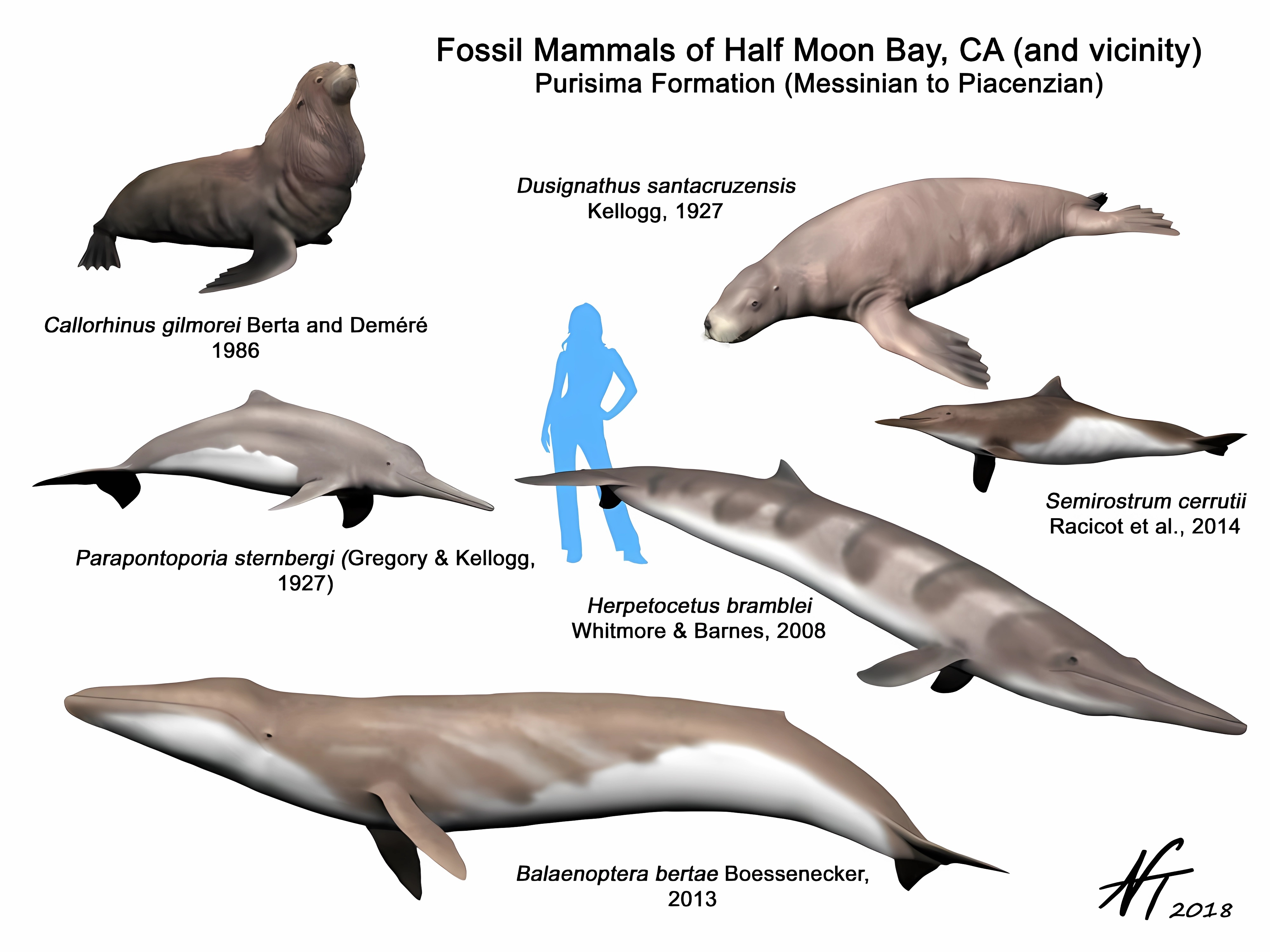
Herpetocetus and other Half Moon Bay genera

== Survival into the Pleistocene ==
A recently discovered specimen of Herpetocetus from the Lower-Middle Pleistocene (Gelasian) Falor Formation of northern California indicates that Herpetocetus survived into the early Pleistocene, shedding light on the diversity of mysticetes in the early Pleistocene. Since other cetotheriids became extinct by the end of the Neogene, it's therefore possible that some Pliocene representatives of Cetotheriidae made it into the Pleistocene to co-exist with extant mysticete species.
