= Hungry Valley Formation =

Geologic formation in California, US

- Stratigraphic range: Neogene
- Type: Formation

Location
- Region: San Emigdio Mountains; Los Angeles County, California
- Country: United States

The Hungry Valley Formation is a geologic formation in the San Emigdio Mountains — near Gorman in northeastern Los Angeles County, California.

It preserves fossils dating back to the Neogene period.

== See also ==
- Neogenee period in California
- List of fossiliferous stratigraphic units in California
- Paleontology in California
