= Goudkoffia =

Goudkoffia Temporal range: Maastrichtian

Scientific classification
- Kingdom: Animalia
- Phylum: Chordata
- Class: Actinopterygii
- Cohort: Euteleostei
- Genus: †Goudkoffia; David, 1946
- Species: †G. delicata

Binomial name
- †Goudkoffia delicata David, 1946

Extinct genus of fishes

Goudkoffia is an extinct genus of prehistoric marine ray-finned fish that lived during the Maastrichtian stage of the Late Cretaceous epoch. It is only known from isolated fossil scales recovered from drill cores in the Moreno and Panoche Formations of southern California, US.

It was initially described in the order Salmoniformes, but the assignment of most former Cretaceous "salmoniforms" to this order is now disputed.

== See also ==
- Prehistoric fish
- List of prehistoric bony fish
