= Al Rose Formation =

Geologic formation in Inyo County, California

- Stratigraphic range: Ordovician
- Type: Formation
- Unit of: Mazourka Group
- Underlies: Badger Flat Limestone

Lithology
- Primary: siltstone, mudstone, and shale
- Other: chert

Location
- Region: Talc City Hills, California
- Country: United States

Type section
- Named for: Al Rose Canyon, Inyo County, California
- Named by: Donald Clarence Ross

The Al Rose Formation is a geologic formation located in Inyo County, California. It is notable for preserving fossils from the Cambrian Period, offering insights into early Paleozoic life and environments.

== Stratigraphy ==
The formation is primarily composed of shale, with interbedded limestone and sandstone layers, indicating a range of depositional environments. These rocks were deposited in a marine setting, as evidenced by their fossil content and sedimentary structures. The formation is stratigraphically positioned within the Great Basin region, an area renowned for its well-preserved Cambrian stratigraphy.

== Fossil Content ==
Fossils recovered from the formation include a variety of trilobites, brachiopods, and archaeocyathids, providing critical data on the diversity of life during the Cambrian explosion. These fossils help paleontologists reconstruct ancient ecosystems and understand evolutionary dynamics during the Cambrian.

== Regional Significance ==
The formation is a key part of the Cambrian stratigraphy in California. Its correlation with other Cambrian formations in the Great Basin, such as the Carrara Formation and the Bonanza King Formation, aids geologists in understanding the geological history of the region and broader paleoenvironmental changes.

== See also ==
- List of fossiliferous stratigraphic units in California
- Paleontology in California
