= Rio Dell Formation =

Geologic formation in California, US

- Stratigraphic range: Neogene
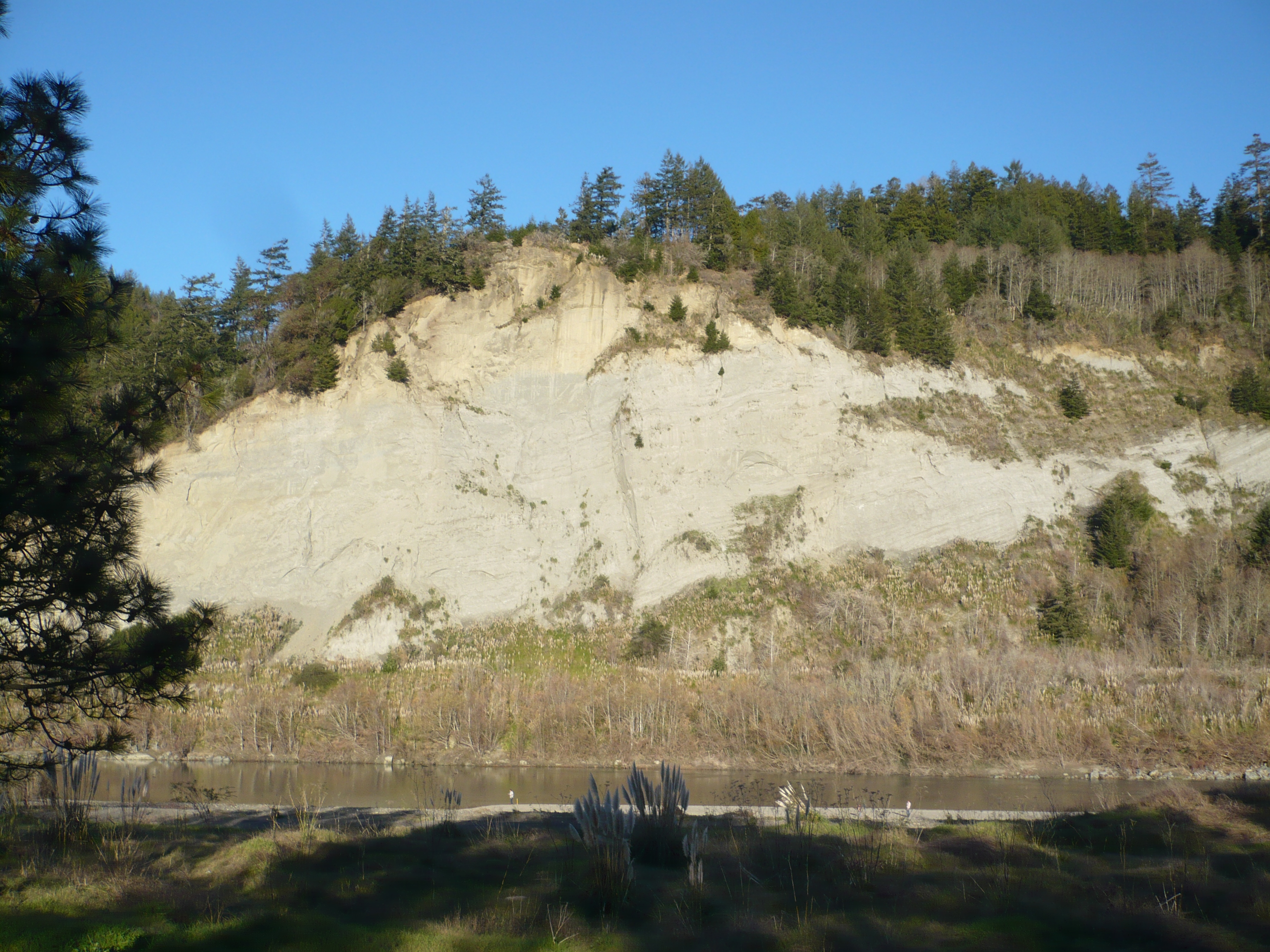
- Rio Dell Formation at Scotia Bluffs
- Type: Formation

Location
- Region: California
- Country: United States

The Rio Dell Formation is a geologic formation in California. It preserves fossils dating back to the Neogene period.

== See also ==
- List of fossiliferous stratigraphic units in California
- Paleontology in California
