= Montezuma Formation =

Geologic formation in California, United States

- Type: Formation

Location
- Region: California
- Country: United States

The Montezuma Formation is a geologic formation in California, just north of the confluence of the Sacramento and San Joaquin Rivers. The formation contains early Pleistocene deposits consisting of "poorly sorted, poorly consolidated clayey sand, silt, and pebble gravel." It is ranked "high" in "Potential Sensitivity for Paleontological Resources."

== See also ==
- List of fossiliferous stratigraphic units in California
- Paleontology in California
