= Diablo Formation =

Diablo Formation may refer to:

- Diablo Formation, California, Neogene geologic formation of California
- Diablo Formation, Colombia, Oligocene geologic formation of Colombia, adjacent to Las Juntas Formation
