= Owens Valley Group =

- Stratigraphic range: Permian
- Type: Group

Location
- Region: California
- Country: United States

The Owens Valley Group is a geologic group in California. It preserves fossils dating back to the Permian period.

== See also ==
- List of fossiliferous stratigraphic units in California
- Paleontology in California
