= Delmar Formation =

Geologic formation in California

- Stratigraphic range: Lutetian
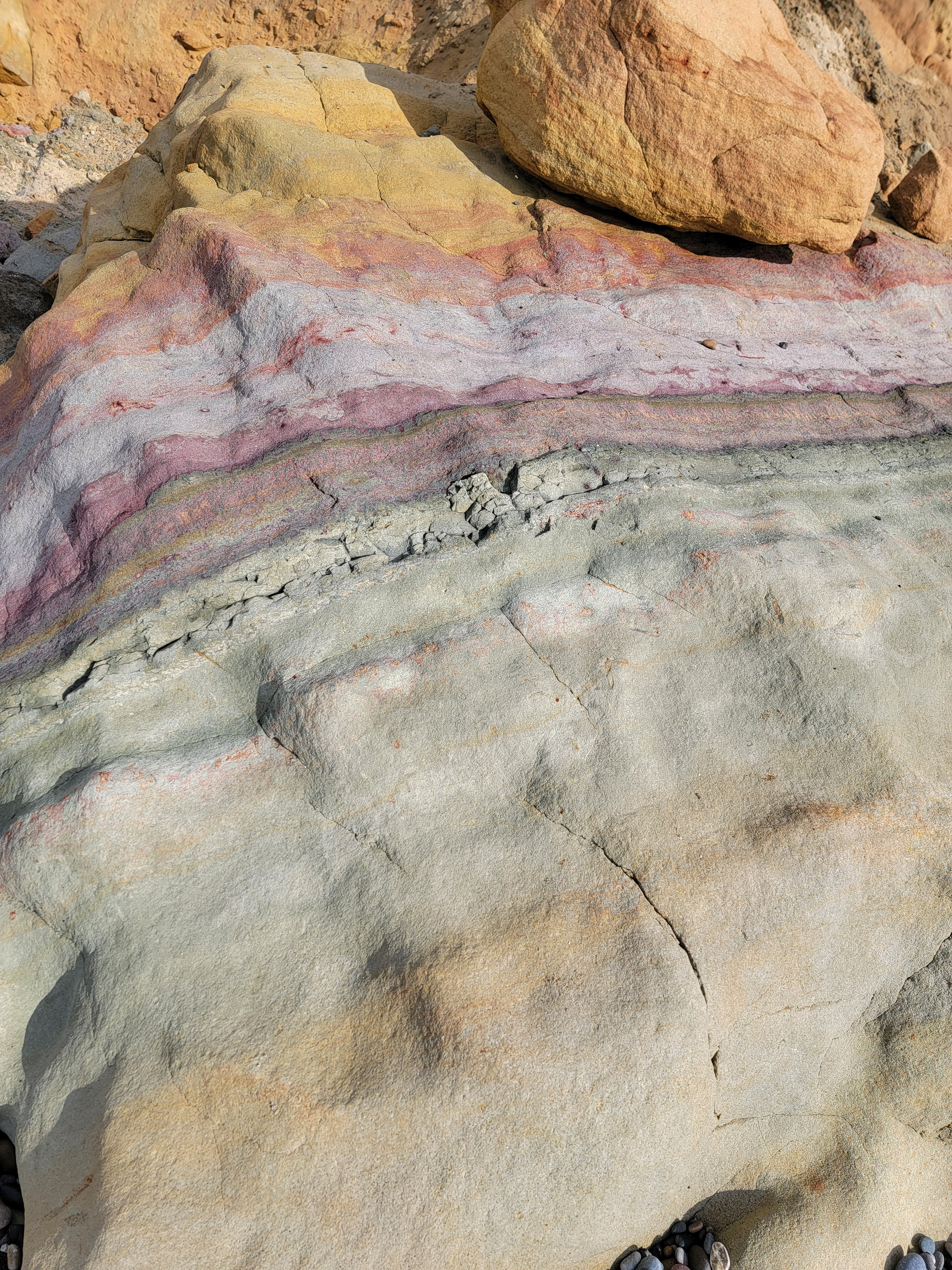
- A broken-off piece of a cliff on the Torrey Pines beach. Delmar Formation (green, bottom) transitioning to Torrey Sandstone (yellow, top).
- Type: Formation

Location
- Region: California
- Country: United States

The Delmar Formation is a geologic formation best exposed in seashore cliffs at Del Mar and Solana Beach in California, overlaid by Torrey Sandstone. The formation rocks comprise the barrier bar for Los Peñasquitos Lagoon and have three sub-facies that can be classified as ancient oyster reefs (Ostrea idrianensis), tidal flats and sublittoral channels and ponds The formation is a result of sedimentary infilling of a large Eocene Delmar lagoon and contains fossils from that period. First identified as "Delmar Sand" by Hanna in 1926. Frederiksen dates the formation as early Lutetian.

== Appearance ==
Delmar Formation consists of dark green claystone and mudstone, greenish-gray muddy sandstone, interbeds formed by biostromes of shells of molluscs.

== Setting ==
Frederiksen places the Delmar Formation and overlaying Torrey Sandstone above the Mount Soledad Formation and below Ardath Shale within the early Lutetian in calcareous nannofossils zone CP12.

The boundary between Delmar Formation and Torrey Sandstone is not clear-cut, the two facies intermix extensively, it is not unusual to find Delmar strata in between Torrey rocks.

The Delmar formation can be observed, together with Torrey Sandstone, for 20 kilometers along the seashore, from Encinitas to the Torrey Pines State Park, both extend up to 13 kilometers inland, and are expected to go to farther in the subsurface in the southwestern direction.

== Fossils ==
The formation contains microfossils (pollen, spores, etc.) and macrofossils (mollusc shells), with the latter indicating the brackish water conditions. Plant material can be also found in the form of remains of grass blades and wood fragments.

== See also ==
- List of fossiliferous stratigraphic units in California
- Paleontology in California

== Sources ==
- Various Contributors to the Paleobiology Database. "Fossilworks: Gateway to the Paleobiology Database". Archived from the original on 19 August 2022.
- Boyer, Jannette Elaine (1974). Sedimentary facies and trace fossils in the Eocene Delmar Formation and Torrey Sandstone, California (PDF) (MA). Rice University.
- Thomson, Celeste; Abbott, Patrick L. (1991). "Petrography of Sandstones Associated with the Eocene Delmar Formation Lagoon". In Abbott, P. L.; May, J. A (eds.). Eocene Geologic History San Diego Region. Pacific Section SEPM. pp. 89–92.
- Frederiksen, Norman O. (1991a). "Petrography of Sandstones Associated with the Eocene Delmar Formation Lagoon". In Abbott, P. L.; May, J. A (eds.). Eocene Geologic History San Diego Region. Pacific Section SEPM. pp. 195–200.
- Frederiksen, Norman O. (December 1991b). "Pulses of Middle Eocene to Earliest Oligocene Climatic Deterioration in Southern California and the Gulf Coast". PALAIOS. 6 (6): 564. doi:10.2307/3514919. ISSN 0883-1351.
- Hanna, Marcus Albert (1926). "Geology of La Jolla Quadrangle". California: California University Publications in Geological Sciences Bulletin. 16 (7): 187–246.
- Wosika, Edward P. (May 23, 1975). Paleoenvironmental and paleogeomorphological implications of the combined Delmar-Ardath Middle Eocene pollen and spore flora (Delmar formation and Ardath Shale of the La Jolla Group), San Diego, California (Senior). SDSU.
