= Altamira Shale =

Geologic formation in California, United States

- Stratigraphic range: Neogene
- Type: Formation

Location
- Region: California
- Country: United States

The Altamira Shale is a geologic formation in California. It preserves fossils dating back to the Neogene period.

The majority of the rocks found on the hills of the Palos Verdes Peninsula are from this shale. These rocks were marketed as Palos Verdes Stone.

== See also ==
- List of fossiliferous stratigraphic units in California
- Paleontology in California
