= Santa Clara Formation =

Geologic formation in California, United States

- Stratigraphic range: Plio-Pleistocene
- Type: Geologic formation

Lithology
- Primary: Gravel, sandstone, siltstone

Location
- Region: Santa Cruz Mountains, Santa Clara County, California
- Country: United States

Type section
- Named for: Santa Clara County

The Santa Clara Formation is a geologic formation in the southeastern Santa Cruz Mountains, in Santa Clara County, California.

== Geology ==
It was formed during the late Pliocene and early Pleistocene Ages of the Neogene Period resp. the Quaternary Period, during the Cenozoic Era. It is composed of fluvial boulder to pebble gravel, sandstone, and siltstone locally including thin bedded lacustrine mudstone.

It preserves fossils dating back to the Neogene period.

== See also ==
- List of fossiliferous stratigraphic units in California
- Neogene California
- Paleontology in California
