= Otay Formation =

Geologic formation in Mexico and the United States

- Stratigraphic range: Oligocene-Miocene
- Type: Formation
- Overlies: Sweetwater Formation

Location
- Region: California; Baja California
- Country: United States, Mexico

The Otay Formation is a geologic formation in San Diego County, California (United States) and northern Baja California state (Mexico). It is within the Peninsular Ranges province.

== Fossils ==
It preserves fossils of the Oligocene to Miocene periods of the Cenozoic Era. Fossils in the Sweetwater Formation that underlies the Otay Formation are of the Late Eocene period.

== See also ==
- List of fossiliferous stratigraphic units in California
- Paleontology in California
- List of fossiliferous stratigraphic units in Mexico
