= Mehrten Formation =

Geologic formation in California, United States

- Stratigraphic range: Neogene
- Type: Formation

Location
- Region: California
- Country: United States

The Mehrten Formation is a geologic formation in California that is a type of inverted relief. It consists primarily of andesitic clastic and pyroclastic materials, deposited by volcanic activity that filled ancient rivers and valleys. Over time, the rock from these deposits proved more resistant to erosion than the surrounding land, leaving behind ridges that follow the paths of the former river channels, resembling inverted river meanders.

It was originally described in 1939 in Geology and Ground-Water Hydrology of the Mokelumne Area, California, Piper et al.

Naturalist John Muir described the formation as "dead rivers" in his writings.

It preserves fossils dating back to the Neogene period.

== See also ==
- List of fossiliferous stratigraphic units in California
- Paleontology in California
- Inverted Relief
