= Pigeon Point Formation =

Geologic formation

- Stratigraphic range: Campanian, Maastrichtian ages Late Cretaceous Period
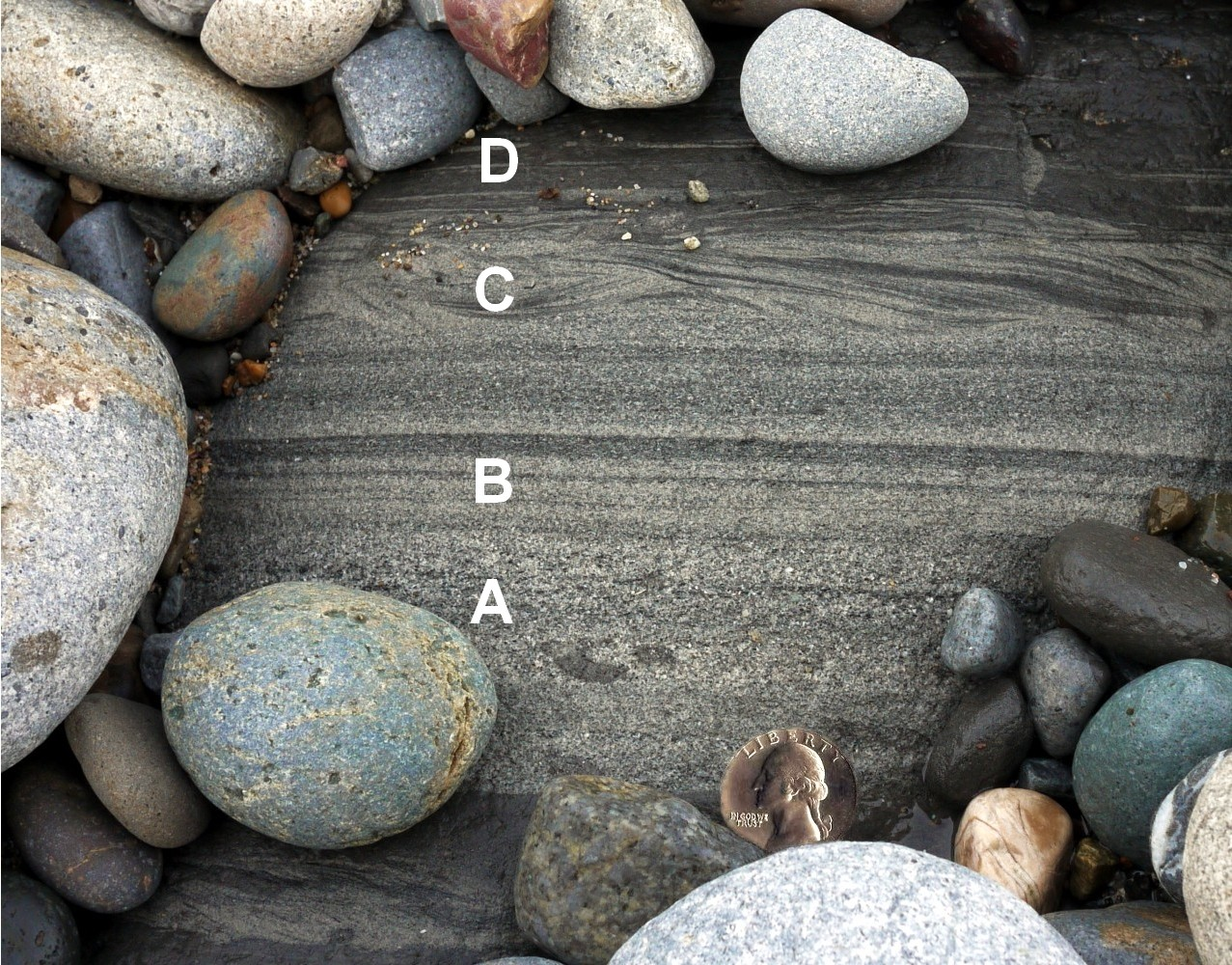
- Turbidite from the Pigeon Point Formation at Pescadero Beach, California
- Type: Geologic formation
- Unit of: Salinian Block
- Thickness: 3 kilometres (9,800 ft)

Lithology
- Primary: conglomerate, sandstone, mudstone

Location
- Region: San Francisco Peninsula; San Mateo County; California
- Country: United States

Type section
- Named for: Pigeon Point

The Pigeon Point Formation is a geologic formation in San Mateo County, California.

== Geology ==
It is found on the western San Francisco Peninsula, on the coast and with its inland section is near the San Gregorio Fault system.

It was formed in the Campanian and Maastrichtian ages of the Late Cretaceous epoch, during the Mesozoic Era.

=== Fossils ===
The Pigeon Point Formation preserves fossils dating back to the Cretaceous period.

== See also ==
- Cretaceous California
- Geology of San Mateo County, California
- List of fossiliferous stratigraphic units in California
