= Laguna Seca Formation =

Geologic formation in California, United States

- Stratigraphic range: Paleogene
- Type: Formation
- Underlies: Tulare Formation
- Overlies: Great Valley sequence

Location
- Region: California
- Country: United States

The Laguna Seca Formation in the O'Neill Forebay area consists of poorly exposed white, fine-grained quartzose marine sandstone of Paleocene age. It conformably overlies the Cretaceous Great Valley sequence, dips northeastward beneath the San Joaquin Valley, and is unconformably overlain by the Plio-Pleistocene Tulare Formation.

== See also ==
- List of fossiliferous stratigraphic units in California
- Paleontology in California
