= Budden Canyon Formation =

Geologic formation in California, United States

- Stratigraphic range: Berriasian-Turonian; ~145–90 Ma
- Type: Geological formation
- Unit of: Great Valley Group
- Sub-units: Bald Hills, Chickabolly, Gas Point, Huling Sandstone & Ogo Members

Lithology
- Primary: Mudstone, sandstone
- Other: Conglomerate, limestone

Location
- Coordinates: 40.4°N 122.5°W
- Approximate paleocoordinates: 40.5°N 78.5°W
- Region: California
- Country: United States

Type section
- Named for: Budden Canyon
- Budden Canyon Formation (the United States) Budden Canyon Formation (California)

The Budden Canyon Formation is the name of a sedimentary rock formation in California of Cretaceous (Berriasian-Turonian) age.

The formation consists of more than 20,000 feet of clastic sediments of non-marine (alluvial fan), shallow marine, slope and basin floor fan turbidites.

== Fossil content ==
The formation is very fossiliferous with common macro-fossils, such as ammonites, gastropods, and bivalves found both in concretions and bedding planes, along with common petrified wood, woody material, and leaf and seed fossils. In addition to these are marine microfossils, including foraminifera and microgastropods. There are also rare vertebrate remains, including fish, a pterosaur, and an indeterminate ornithopod dinosaur.

== See also ==
- List of dinosaur-bearing rock formations
  - List of stratigraphic units with indeterminate dinosaur fossils
