= Asuncion Group =

- Stratigraphic range: Cretaceous
- Type: Group

Location
- Region: California
- Country: United States

The Asuncion Group is a geologic group in California. It preserves fossils dating back to the Cretaceous period.

== See also ==
- List of fossiliferous stratigraphic units in California
- Paleontology in California
