= Scotia Bluffs =

Cliffs in California, United States

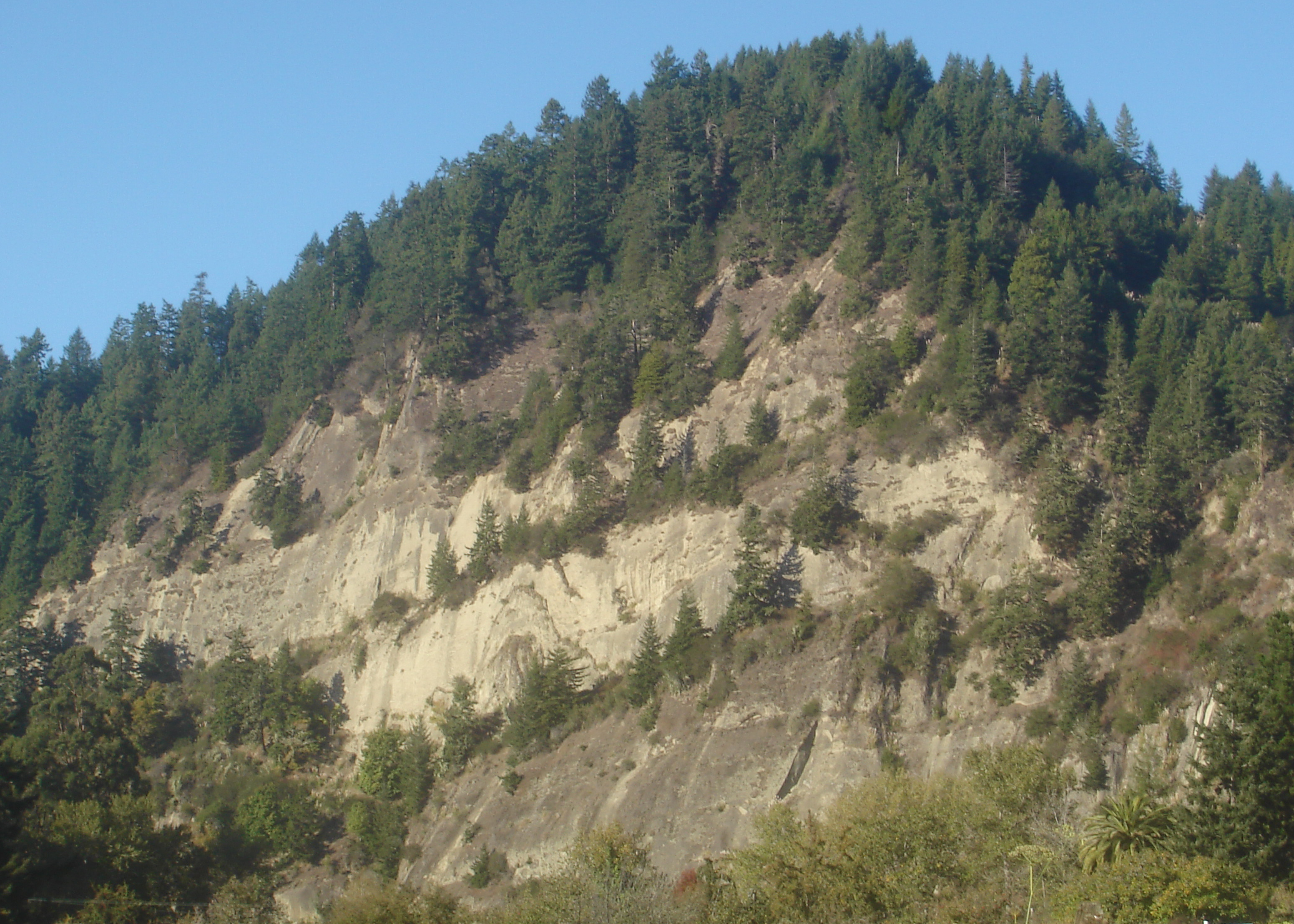
- Upper portion of Scotia Bluffs viewed from Rio Dell

Highest point
- Prominence: 550 ft (170 m)
- Coordinates: 40°30′36″N 124°05′55″W

Geography
- Location: Humboldt County, California
- Topo map: USGS Hydesville

Scotia Bluffs form a 2-mile (3-kilometer) series of gray sandstone cliffs along the north bank of the Eel River near Rio Dell, California.

== Geology ==
The course of the lower Eel River changes from northeasterly to westerly as it encounters the resistant Rio Dell Formation of fossiliferous upper Pliocene marine sandstone 15 miles (24 kilometers) inland from the Pacific Ocean. River turbulence has created deep pools beneath steep sandstone cliffs on the northeasterly bank. Tributary streams, including Nanning Creek, cut steep, narrow canyons through the cliffs. The southwesterly bank of the river is an alluvial plain extending to the estuary. The community of Rio Dell occupies the bank opposite the cliffs. The cliffs expose abundant remains of ancient clams and sand dollars.

== History ==
Pacific Lumber Company built a railroad across the face of the cliffs between 1883 and 1885 to transport lumber to Eureka, California. This alignment was followed by the Northwestern Pacific Railroad to avoid bridging the lower Eel River. The rail line maintained an elaborate series of benches, retaining walls, and trestles approximately 50 feet (15 meters) above the river during low summer flows, and the cliffs extend 75 to 500 feet (23 to 152 meters) above the track. These trestles and benches have been frequently damaged by floods and by massive blocks of sandstone falling from the upper cliffs. Rail service was interrupted in 1907, 1913, 1933, 1938, 1942, 1946, 1955, 1956, 1957, 1964 and 1971. A railroad bridge crew was assigned to work exclusively on the Scotia Bluff trestles from 1916 through 1959. Flood waters reached track level in 1955 and were 11 feet (3.4 m) over the railway in 1964. Three trainmen were killed when engine 184 was swept into the river by a 17 January 1953 landslide off the bluffs.
