= Great Valley Group =

- Stratigraphic range: Jurassic
- Type: Group

Location
- Region: California
- Country: United States

The Great Valley Group is a proposed and widely accepted renaming of the Great Valley Sequence, a geologic group in California. It preserves fossils dating back to the Jurassic period.

== See also ==
- List of fossiliferous stratigraphic units in California
- Paleontology in California
