= Silverado Formation =

Geologic formation in California, United States

- Stratigraphic range: Paleogene
- Type: Formation
- Thickness: 700ft-1425ft

Location
- Region: California
- Country: United States

Type section
- Named for: Silverado Canyon

The Silverado Formation is a geologic formation in Orange County, California. It preserves fossils dating back to the Paleogene period.

The formation is located in the Santa Ana Mountains forming a horseshoe shape surrounding the outskirts on both eastern and western sides. It is also preserved in small areas on the peaks where younger basalt flows covered and protected these layers from the erosion, forming layers under the mesas of basalt (Elsinore peak, Redondo Mesa, etc.). It is named after Silverado Canyon where it was mined for coal from the “Harris Coal Mine”, now overgrown by bush near the church. It consists of sandstone, clay, and conglomerate. The sandstone is most likely marine, but may very well be non-marine in the upper section. The non-marine and brackish areas consist of 2 different clay beds, both laid down in an ancient Paleocene swamp, both mined for high quality refractory clays such as fireclay, ball clay, and kaolin. The top bed in knows as the “Serrano Bed” named after a mine that is now underneath developed land in Mission Viejo, and it primarily a very plastic, very white kaolinized sandstone, formed from weathering of an arkosic sandstone in place, leaving a white sandstone with only silica sand as the grains and white clay as the matrix. The coal beds also occur right below this bed as can be seen in Trabuco Canyon.

The lower bed is known as the “Claymont Bed” it is a more highly weathered, but yet more iron stained bed. The top half of which is primarily dark red fire clays, some with a pisolitic texture almost like bauxite. Directly below this layer on the Eastern side, is a crystalline granite bedrock so weathered, it's turned into a residual clay bed, mainly of pink and white mottled clays, with lower iron but also lower alumina then the transported clays directly above it that preserved this. This occurred during the Cretaceous time period, when it was exposed to the surface of the once tropical climate.

These clays have been mined since the late 1800s for firebrick and other refractories, the red beds for all manor of heavy clay products and stonewares.

The other main sandstone beds in between the clays have much less economic value and hence much less info on them. Though they make up most of the formation.

== See also ==
- List of fossiliferous stratigraphic units in California
- Paleontology in California

== Other sources ==
- Various Contributors to the Paleobiology Database. "Fossilworks: Gateway to the Paleobiology Database".
- United States Geological Survey. "Geolex - Silverado publications". Archived from the original on 2021-06-16.
