= Coso Formation =

Geological Formation

- Stratigraphic range: Neogene
- Type: Formation

Location
- Region: Inyo County, California
- Country: United States

The Coso Formation is a geologic formation in the Coso Range of the Mojave Desert, in Inyo County, California.

It preserves fossils dating back to the Neogene period. It yields fossil remains of many species of mammals, including of Equus simplicidens, the Hagerman Horse.

== See also ==
- Paleogene period in California
- List of fossiliferous stratigraphic units in California
- Paleontology in California

== Bibliography ==
- Various Contributors to the Paleobiology Database. "Fossilworks: Gateway to the Paleobiology Database".
