= Suchian (faunal age) =

Faunal age of Japan

The Suchian was a faunal age of Japan, lasting from 3 to 1.9 million years ago, at the boundary of the Pliocene and Pleistocene epochs. It corresponds in age to the latter part of the Blancan of North America, and to most of the Piacenzian and Gelasian of Europe.
