= Purisima Formation =

Geologic formation in California, United States

- Stratigraphic range: Late Miocene-Early Pleistocene; ~7–3 Ma
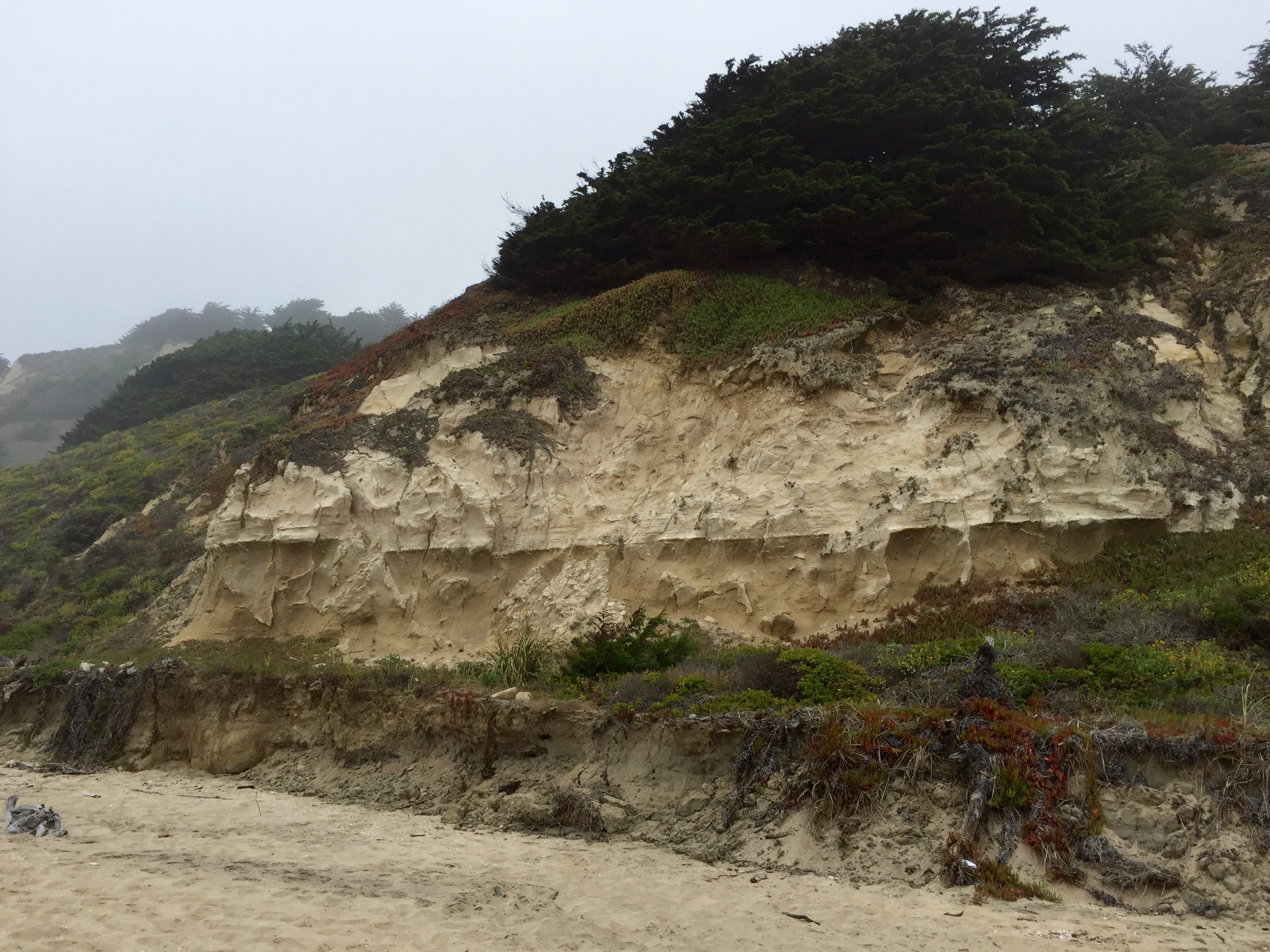
- Outcrop of Purisima Formation sandstone at San Gregorio State Beach
- Type: Formation

Lithology
- Primary: Sandstone, siltstone
- Other: Conglomerate, phosphorite

Location
- Region: California
- Country: United States

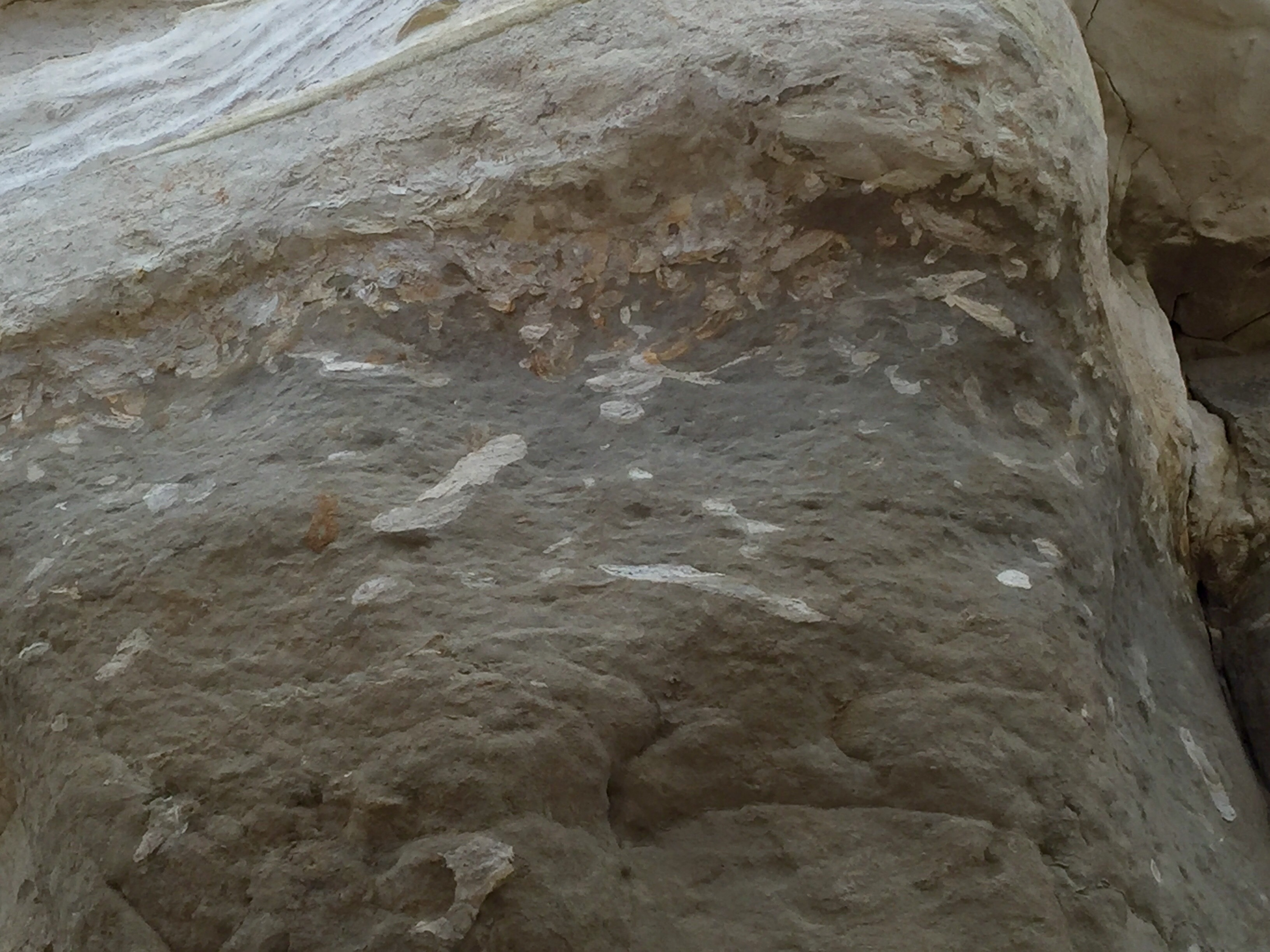
Trace fossils in Purisima Formation sandstone at San Gregorio State Beach in California

The Purisima Formation is a geologic formation in California that preserves fossils dating from the Late Miocene to Late Pliocene. It stretches from Point Reyes to the Santa Cruz Mountains.

== See also ==
- List of fossiliferous stratigraphic units in California
- Paleontology in California
