= Battery Formation =

Geologic formation in California, United States

- Stratigraphic range: Pleistocene
- Type: Formation

Location
- Region: California
- Country: United States

The Battery Formation is a geologic formation located in Del Norte County, California, particularly near Battery Point in Crescent City. The Battery Formation dates back to the Pleistocene epoch, from approximately 2.6 million to 11,700 years ago.

== Geology ==
The Battery Formation consists of continental deposits, including stream gravels and sand ridges. These sediments were deposited in fluvial environments, with additional influences from coastal processes. This dynamic interplay of terrestrial and marine factors during the Pleistocene epoch shaped the geology of the formation. The deposits were contemporaneous with the development of coastal sand dunes.

== Fossil record ==
The Battery Formation is known to preserve fossils, providing valuable insights into the paleoenvironment of northern California during the Pleistocene.

== See also ==
- Geology of California
- Pleistocene
