= Paleontology in California =

Paleontological research occurring within or conducted by California

Location of the state of California

The fossil record of California extends to the Precambrian. During the early Paleozoic, California was covered by a warm shallow sea inhabited by marine invertebrates such as ammonites, brachiopods, corals, and trilobites. During the Carboniferous and Permian periods, swamps covered areas of the state no longer submerged by the sea. During the Mesozoic, California continued to comprise both marine and terrestrial habitats. Local marine life included ammonites, marine reptiles, and oysters. On land, dinosaurs roamed among cycads and conifers.

During the Cenozoic, sea levels rose and fell over time, so the state was home to a variety of ancient environments including shallow seas, estuaries and dry land. The state would come to be home to creatures such as camels, three-toed horses, mastodonts, oreodonts, saber-toothed cats, ground sloths, and dire wolves.

Local Native Americans devised myths to explain local fossils, many containing themes paralleling modern scientific discoveries. Local fossils came to the attention of formally trained scientists by the mid-19th century. Major finds include the Pleistocene mammal fossils of the La Brea tar pits. The Pleistocene saber-toothed cat Smilodon californicus is the California state fossil.

== Prehistory ==
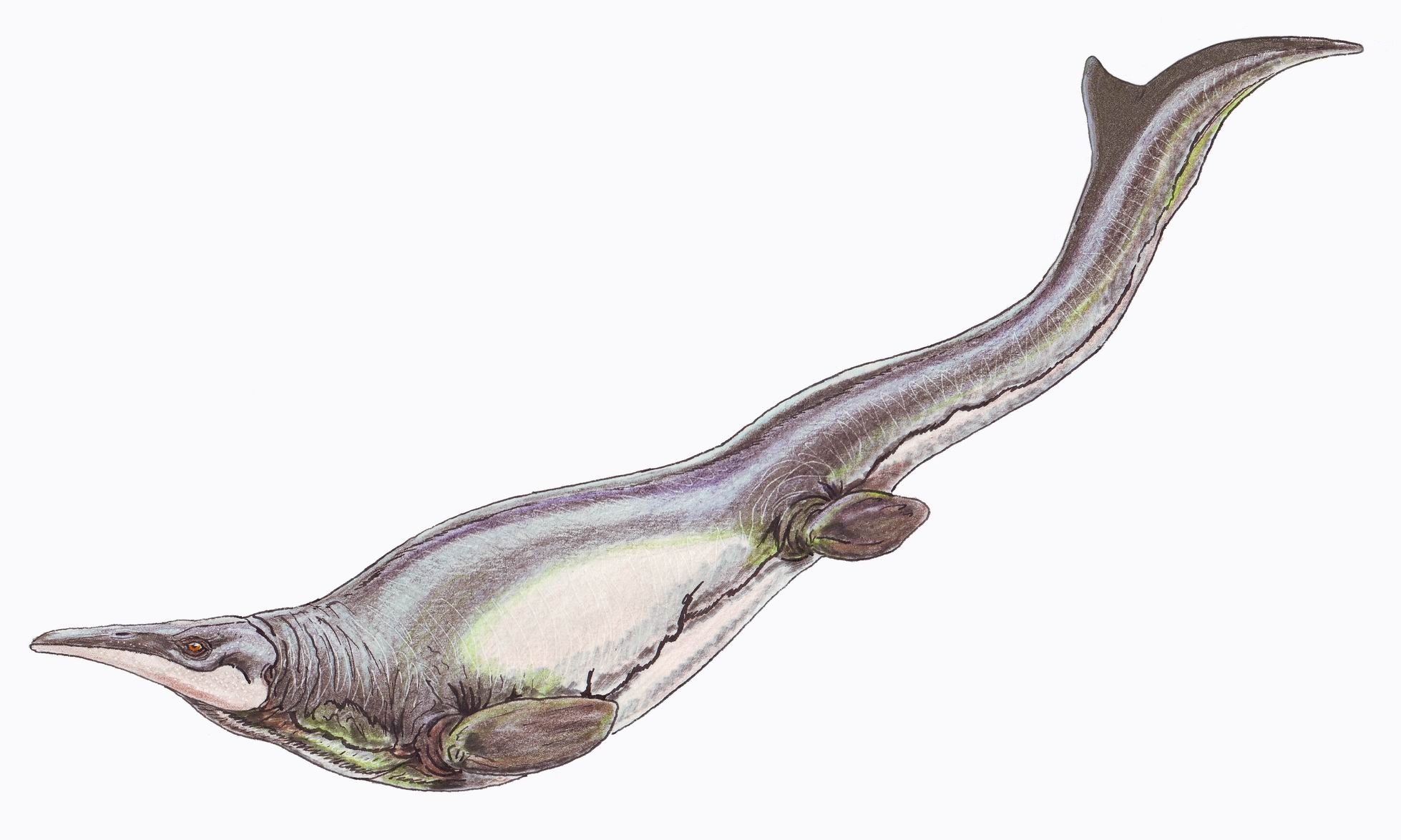
Plotosaurus

Precambrian fossils are present but rare in California. During the early Paleozoic, California was covered by a warm shallow sea inhabited by marine invertebrates such as ammonites, brachiopods, and corals. At least two different genera of trilobites lived in San Bernardino County during the Early Cambrian. By Mississippian times California was home to brachiopods and corals that would later silicify. Later, during the Carboniferous and Permian periods northern California had a variety of environments. Deep and shallow marine deposits as well as estuaries and swamps could be found in Butte and Shasta Counties during this interval. Later, during the Pennsylvanian, both the corals and brachiopods were still living in the state.

California was a region of geologic upheaval during the Mesozoic, including both Mountain formation and volcanism. The Sierra Nevada began forming at this time. Mesozoic California included areas of both marine and terrestrial environments. The local seas were home to a variety of marine invertebrates and marine reptiles. The terrestrial flora included plants such as conifers, cycads, and ginkgoes. Radiolaria were widespread in California during the Jurassic. Some of the best fossilized specimens come from the Stow Lake area and Strawberry Hill in Golden Gate Park. During the Cretaceous invertebrates such as ammonites and pearl oysters lived in California. Both coiled and uncoiled ammonites were preserved in California's Late Cretaceous deposits. During the Late Campanian and Maastrichtian California was home to evolutionarily advanced mosasaurs including Plesiotylosaurus and Plotosaurus. Abundant elasmosaur fossils belonging to a few genera including Hydrotherosaurus, Aphrosaurus, Fresnosaurus, and Morenosaurus have been unearthed here too. On land, a variety of dinosaurs inhabited the state. Among them were the ankylosaur Aletopelta, and many duck-billed dinosaurs, most notably Augustynolophus.

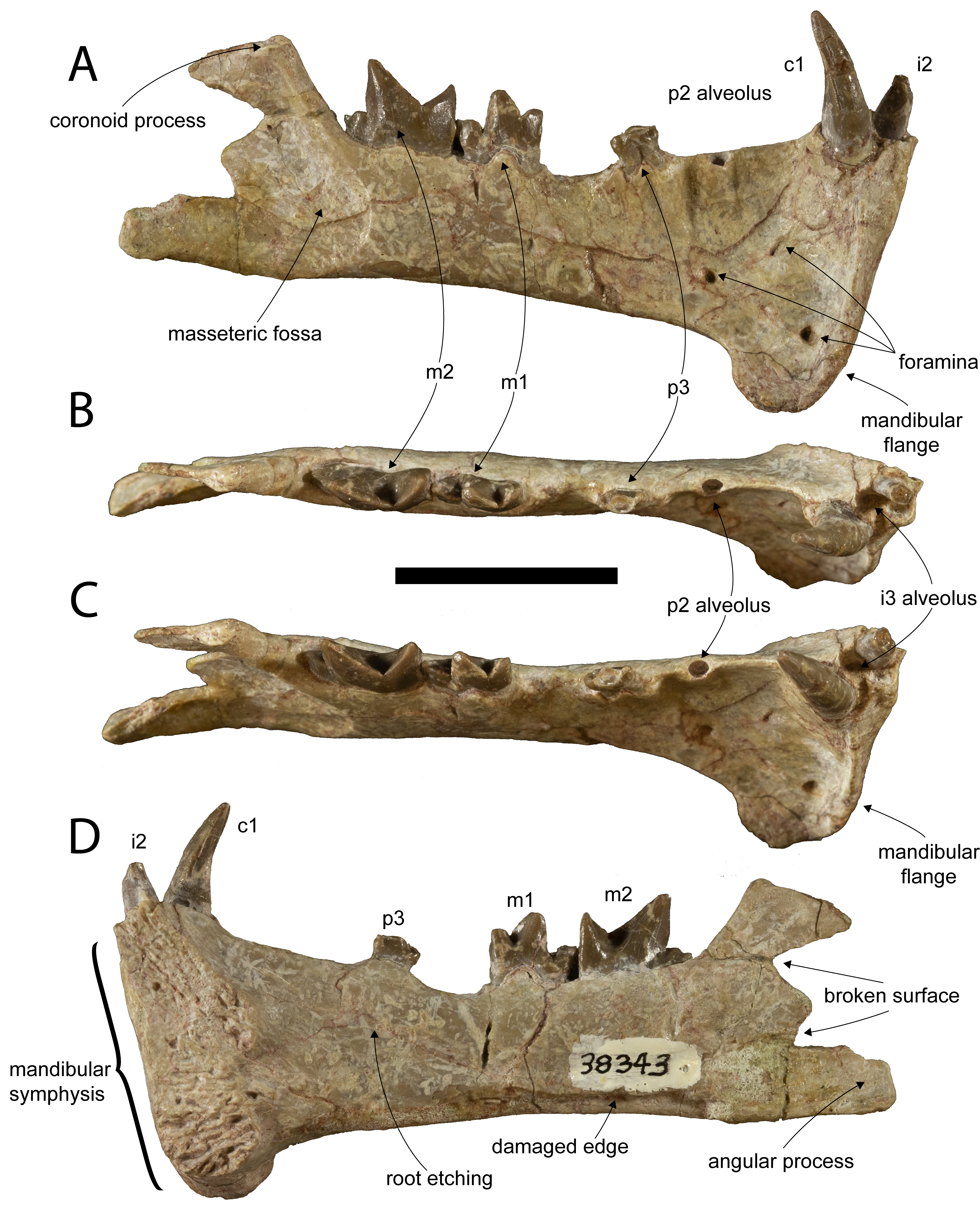
Diegoaelurus mandible

Into the Cenozoic era, California was still very geologically active. The Coast and Transverse Mountains were created by the same geologic forces responsible for raising the Sierra Nevada during the Mesozoic. Sea levels rose and fell over time, so the state was home to a variety of ancient environments including shallow seas, estuaries and dry land. More than 2,300 species of Tertiary insects have been documented in the ancient tar deposits of California. Middle Eocene invertebrates of California included corals, gastropods, and pelecypods. At least some of these corals were solitary. Oligocene plant fossils include leaves, fruit and wood. During the Middle Miocene, Los Angeles County was home to a diverse fauna of marine invertebrates including many kinds of gastropods and pelecypods. Many of these fossils are very well preserved. Middle Miocene acorn barnacles were preserved in Santa Clara County. During the Late Miocene 18 inch long oysters lived in Contra Costa County. In Sonoma County freshwater gastropods and pelecypods were preserved. Sand dollars also inhabited California during the Late Miocene. California was home to aquatic mammals such as the dugongid Dusisiren and the desmostyle Paleoparadoxia during the Miocene. At the boundary between the Miocene and the Pliocene alder, cherry, Christmas berry, chumico, coffee berry, dogwood, elm, flannel bush, Catalina ironwood, California lilac, magnolia, mountain mahogany, manzanita, live oak, poplar, bush poppy, swamp cypress, sumac, desert sweet, sycamore, tupelo, and willow all grew around the San Francisco Bay Area.

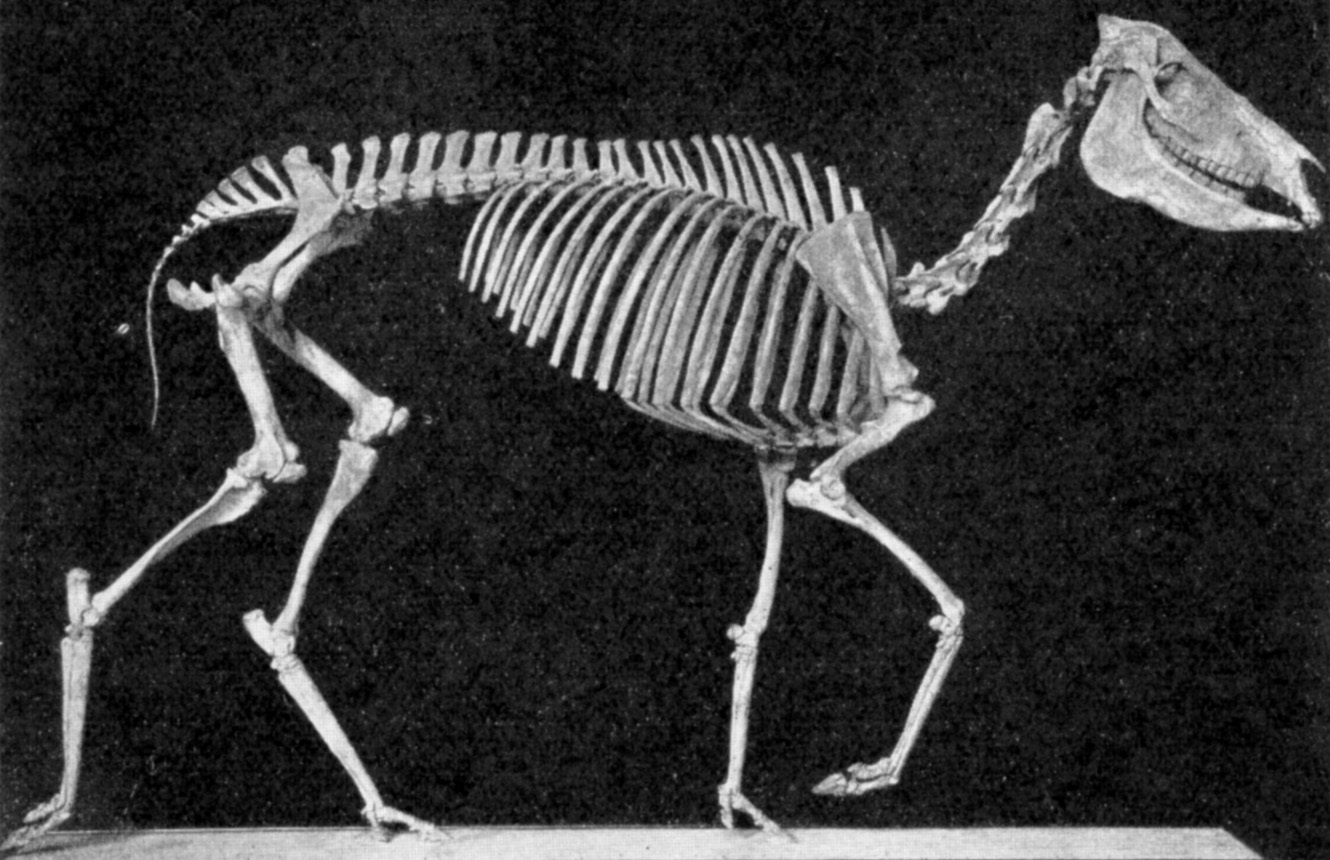
Hipparion

An abundance of Pliocene plants are known from San Francisco. During the early Pliocene, the Berkeley Hills area was home to creatures such as camels, horses, mastodonts, and oreodonts. Near Mount Diablo deposits of similar age provide evidence for at least three different kinds of camel, cranes, a fox, a primitive ground squirrel, a small beaver, horses (with the three-toed horse Hipparion forcei being the most common), hyena-like animals, a lizard, abundant mastodonts, mountain lion-like cats, a mustelid, oreodonts, peccaries, rabbits, raccoon-like animals, a ring-tailed cat, and possible saber-toothed cats. Middle Pliocene was home to creatures such as bear dogs, camels of various sizes, flamingos, ground sloths, mastodons, pronghorns, two different kinds of rhinoceros, and small rodents. The late Pliocene saw the appearance of many of California's modern animals, however there were also giant tortoises among the contemporary fauna. During the Pliocene, the Scotia–Eureka area was home to marine invertebrates. During the Late Pliocene pelecypods and gastropods are known. At the same time, ark shells were preserved in a wide variety of places in California.

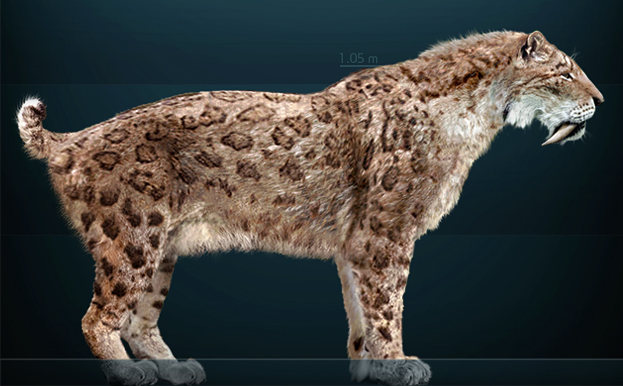
Smilodon

By the Quaternary, California's wildlife had taken on a relatively modern aspect. The landscape included lakes and rivers, as well as glaciers. Local wildlife included camels, saber-teeth, and mammoths. Pleistocene]invertebrates have been found in great abundance near Ventura. This collection of fossils is known as the Black Hawk Ranch assemblages and is widely regarded as the best early Pleistocene fauna west of the Rocky Mountains. Since its discovery the Black Hawk Ranch assemblage has produced camels, primitive coyotes, deer, elk, horses, relatives of modern musk oxen, an unusual kind of pronghorn antelope, rodents, saber-teeth, and dire wolves. Pleistocene plant fossils are widespread in the Bay area. Twelve species of modern tree are known from near Tomales. Other Pleistocene plants include the southernmost examples known of coast redwoods and a spectacular Douglas fir specimens from a tree with a trunk six feet in diameter and complete with its seeds and needles. Other Pleistocene invertebrates of California included hardshell cockles, spiny cockles, and oysters. Late Pleistocene fossils are widespread in California.

== History ==
=== Indigenous interpretations ===
Scientific concepts such as deep time and faunal succession have precursors in the creation mythology of California's Achomawi or Pit River people. They believe humanity to be the descendants of creatures neither human nor animal that lived during the earth's early days. A great flood triggered an event called the Great Change resulting in the extinctions of some kinds of life and the transformation of others. Following the Great Change the Pit River people believe that the First People changed into modern forms of life including birds, fish, insects, mammals and reptiles, with each kind of animal inheriting some of the traits of its pre-Change ancestors. The Pit River peoples thought local Cenozoic fossil acorns were left by oak trees from before the Great Change.

The early creatures of Pit River mythology include dragons and sea monsters. One was called Himnimtsooke, or Giant Water Dragon and was similar to a giant salamander. When Himnimtsooke was killed its body was dismembered and scattered in the sea. The Qwilla were another kind of dragon from the world before the Great Change. After the change happened the Qwilla were transformed into modern alligator lizards. Although the Qwilla were originally portrayed by Pit River storytellers as giant lizards, the depictions changed as the idea of dinosaurs entered popular culture and the Qwilla were made over as dinosaurs.

One version of the Qwilla myth depicts the king of the Qwillas as being killed somewhere south of the Fall River Valley. After the king Qwilla's death, the Creator exiled the Qwilla to the south. This story serves as an explanation for the absence of alligators and conspicuous dinosaur remains in northern California. Stories explaining the absence of fossils are extremely unusual. The deserts of the southwestern US where the Qwilla were exiled to are home to abundant and obvious dinosaur remains.

=== Scientific research ===
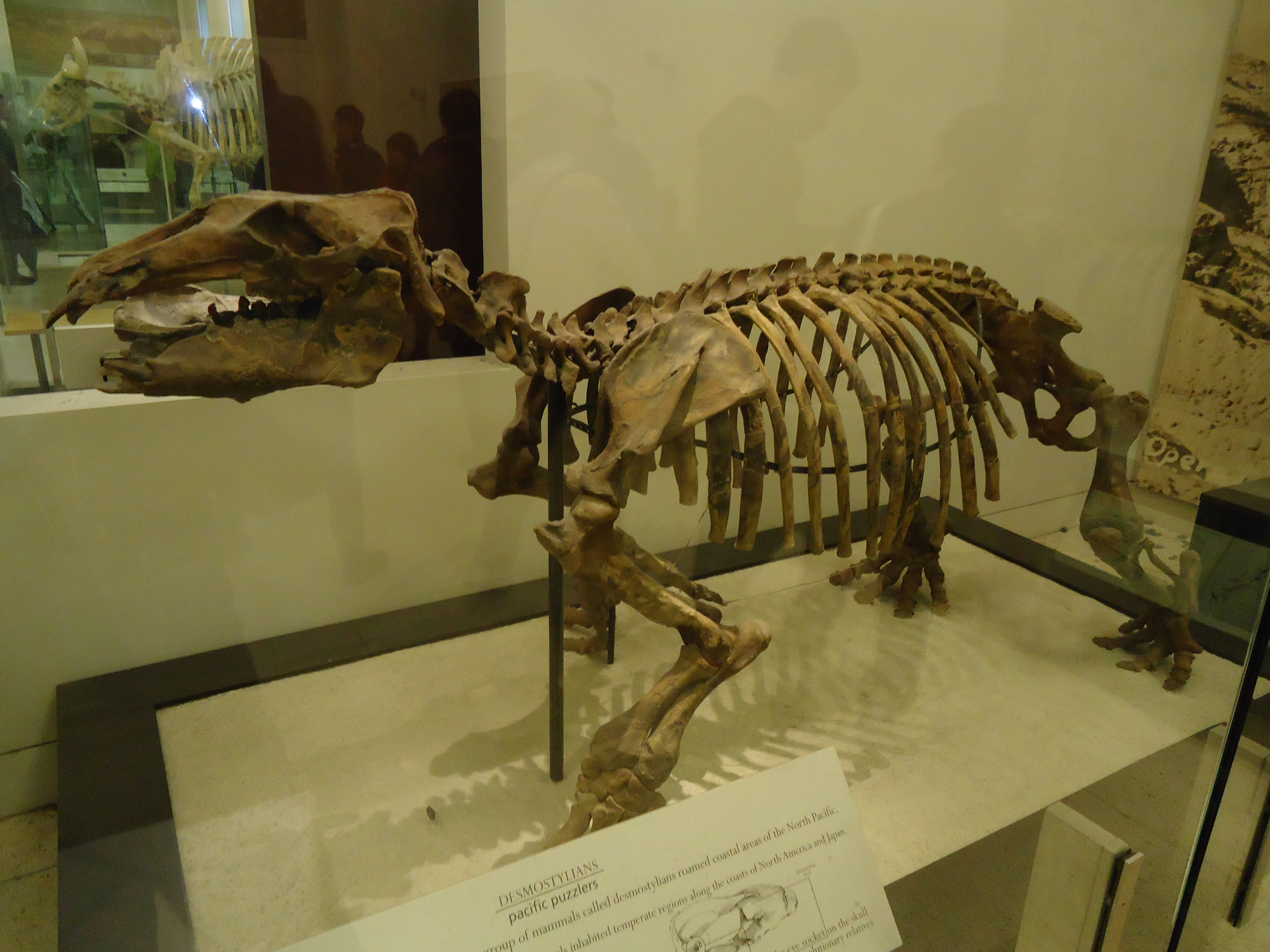
Paleoparadoxia

In 1856 a new upper Miocene deposit preserving the remains of 18-inch oysters was discovered in the Kirker Pass of Contra Costa County. This find became known as the Pecten Beds. Between 1906 and 1916 hundreds of thousands of Pleistocene fossils were uncovered in central Los Angeles. In 1942 early Pleistocene fossils were discovered in gravel pits at Irvington. In 1963, Samuel Welles of the University of California, Berkeley collected a dugongid called Dusisiren. This specimen is the most complete known Miocene sirenian. On October 2, 1964, excavations on the site of Stanford University's campus uncovered the remains of an aquatic desmostyle mammal called Neoparadoxia. The skeleton was nearly complete, preserving 175 of the 200 bones a complete skeleton would have. The specimen was only the second of its kind in the entire world, and the first in North America. The discovery was considered one of the most significant finds in North American paleontology.

== Paleontologists ==
=== Births ===
- Joseph T. Gregory was born in Eureka on July 28, 1914.
- Thomas R. Holtz, Jr. was born in Los Angeles in 1965.
- Malcolm McKenna was born in Pomona in 1930.
- Richard H. Tedford was born in Encino on April 25, 1929.

=== Deaths ===
- Annie Montague Alexander died in Oakland on December 10, 1950 at age 82.
- Roy Chapman Andrews died in Carmel-by-the-Sea on March 11, 1960 at age 76.
- Charles Lewis Camp died in San Jose on 14 August 1975.
- Ulysses S. Grant IV died in Santa Monica on March 11, 1977.

== Natural history museums ==
- Children's Natural History Museum, Fremont
- Berkeley Natural History Museums, Berkeley
- Bowers Museum, Santa Ana
- Buena Vista Museum of Natural History, Bakersfield
- California Academy of Sciences, San Francisco
- California Mining and Mineral Museum, Mariposa
- George C. Page Museum at the La Brea Tar Pits, Los Angeles
- Humboldt State University Natural History Museum, Arcata
- Humboldt State University Wildlife Museum, Arcata
- Imperial Valley College Desert Museum, Ocotillo
- Maturango Museum, Ridgecrest
- Morro Bay State Park Museum of Natural History, Morro Bay
- Natural History Museum of Los Angeles County, Los Angeles
- Oakland Museum of California, Oakland
- Pacific Grove Museum of Natural History, Pacific Grove
- Randall Museum, Corona Heights Park, San Francisco
- Raymond M. Alf Museum of Paleontology, Claremont
- San Diego Natural History Museum, San Diego
- Santa Barbara Museum of Natural History, Santa Barbara
- Santa Cruz Museum of Natural History, Santa Cruz
- Sierra College Natural History Museum, Rocklin
- University of California Museum of Paleontology, Berkeley
- Western Science Center, Hemet

== Notable clubs and associations ==
- Southern California Paleontological Society
- Fossils for Fun Society, Inc.
- San Diego Mineral and Gem Society

== See also ==
- Paleontology in Arizona
- Paleontology in Nevada
- Paleontology in Oregon
