= Horquilla Formation =

Geologic formation in Arizona and New Mexico

- Stratigraphic range: Pennsylvanian
- Type: Formation
- Sub-units: La Tuna Member, Berino Member, Bishop Cap Member
- Underlies: Earp Formation
- Overlies: Escabrosa Limestone, Black Prince Limestone, Paradise Formation, Helms Formation
- Thickness: 800–3,520 ft (240–1,070 m)

Lithology
- Primary: Limestone
- Other: Shale, sandstone

Location
- Coordinates: 31.669°N 110.066°W
- Region: Arizona, New Mexico
- Country: United States

Type section
- Named for: Horquilla Peak, Cochise County, Arizona
- Named by: James Gilluly, J.R. Cooper, and J. Steele Williams
- Year defined: 1954
- Horquilla Formation (the United States) Horquilla Formation (Arizona)

The Horquilla Formation is a geologic formation exposed in southern Arizona and New Mexico. It preserves fossils dating back to the Pennsylvanian.

== Description ==
The formation is mostly thinly bedded pinkish limestone, weathering to blue-gray, with occasional thicker beds of limestone and thinner beds of shaly limestone. The thicker limestone beds typically consist mostly of fragments of crinoids. In southeastern Arizona, the formation lies on top of the Escabrosa Limestone, the Black Prince Limestone, or the Paradise Formation, and is overlain in turn by the Earp Formation. In the Organ Mountains, the formation rests disconformably on the Helms Formation. The formation varies in thickness from 800 ft (240 m) in the Chiricahua Mountains to 3,450 ft (1,050 m) in the Big Hatchet Mountains.

The formation is thought to have been laid down in the Horquilla Seaway, a continental shelf environment on the southwest coast of Pangaea.

== Fossils ==
The formation is highly fossiliferous. The most numerous fossils at the type section are brachiopods (such as Neospirifer, Composita, and Dictyoclostus) and fusulinids (such as Fusulina and Fusulinella). Crinoid stems, syringoporoid corals, and bryozoans are also common. The fossils are post-Morrowan (Moscovian to Kasimovian) in age. Demosponges such as Chaetetes are found in exposures further east, in the Chiricahua Mountains and Big Hatchet Mountains. Exposures in the Organ Mountains include fossils of Chaetetes, Petalaxis, Fusulinella, and cordaite leaf impressions.

== History of investigation ==
The formation was first designated by James Gilluly and coinvestigators in 1954, who raised the Naco Formation to group rank and assigned its lowermost beds to the Horquilla Formation. The type section is on an eastern spur of Horquilla Peak in the Tombstone Hills of southern Arizona. The formation was later mapped as far west as the Vekol Mountains and as far east as the Big Hatchet Mountains in the New Mexico bootheel. Spencer G. Lucas and Karl Krainer have noted the similarity of the Pennsylvanian beds of the Organ Mountains to the Horquilla Formation, and have proposed lowering the La Tuna Formation, Berino Formation, and Bishop Cap Formation to member rank within the Horquilla Formation.

== See also ==
- List of fossiliferous stratigraphic units in New Mexico
- Paleontology in New Mexico
