= List of fossiliferous stratigraphic units in Arizona =

This article contains a list of fossil-bearing stratigraphic units in the state of Arizona, U.S.

== Sites ==
Group or Formation	Period	Notes
Amole Arkose	Cretaceous	
Bidahochi Formation	Neogene	
Big Sandy Formation	Neogene	
Bisbee Group/Lowell Formation	Cretaceous	
Bisbee Group/Mural Limestone	Cretaceous	
Bisbee Group/Shellenberger Canyon Formation	Cretaceous	
Bisbee Group/Turney Ranch Formation	Cretaceous	
Black Prince Limestone	Carboniferous	
Bright Angel Formation	Cambrian	
Chinle Formation	Triassic	
Chinle Group/Petrified Forest Formation	Triassic	
Cintura Formation	Cretaceous	
Colina Formation	Permian	
Concha Formation	Permian	
Dakota Formation	Cretaceous	
Dox Formation	Neoproterozoic (stromatolite beds)	
Earp Formation	Permian	
Epitaph Formation	Permian	
Escabrosa Limestone	Mississippian	
Fort Apache Formation	Permian	
Fort Crittenden Formation	Cretaceous	
Frenchman Mountain Dolostone	Cambrian	
Gardner Canyon Formation	Jurassic	
Gila Formation	Neogene	
Gila Conglomerate Formation	Pliocene – Pleistocene	
Glen Canyon Group/Kayenta Formation	Jurassic	
Glen Canyon Group/Moenave Formation	Jurassic, Triassic	
Glen Canyon Group/Navajo Sandstone	Jurassic	
Glen Canyon Group/Wingate Sandstone	Triassic	
Hermit Shale	Permian, Carboniferous	
Kaibab Limestone	Permian	
Kayenta Formation	Jurassic	
Mancos Shale	Cretaceous	
Martin Formation	Devonian	
Mesa Verde Group/Toreva Formation	Cretaceous	
Milk Creek Formation	Neogene	
Moenkopi Formation	Triassic	
Molly Gibson Formation	Cretaceous	
Morrison Formation	Jurassic	
Mountain Springs Formation	Devonian	
Muav Limestone	Cambrian	
Muddy Creek Formation	Neogene	
Mural Limestone	Cretaceous	
Naco Formation	Pennsylvanian	
Naco Group/Cochise Formation	Permian	
Naco Group/Colina Formation	Permian	
Onyx Marble Formation	Neogene	
Paradise Formation	Carboniferous	
Percha Formation	Devonian	
Quiburis Formation	Neogene	
Redwall Limestone	Mississippian	
Snyder Hill Formation	Permian	
St. David Formation	Pliocene - Pleistocene	
Summerville Formation	Jurassic	
Supai Formation	Permian, Carboniferous	
Supai Group	Permian, Carboniferous	
Supai Group/Watahomigi Formation	Carboniferous	
Surprise Canyon Formation	Carboniferous	
Toreva Formation	Cretaceous	
Toroweap Formation	Permian	

== See also ==
- Paleontology in Arizona
