= Broken Jug Formation =

Geologic formation in New Mexico

- Stratigraphic range: late Jurassic
- Type: Formation
- Unit of: Bisbee Group
- Underlies: Hell-to-Finish Formation
- Overlies: Paleozoic limestones
- Thickness: 1,200 meters (3,900 ft)

Lithology
- Primary: Diverse marine, deltaic, and volcanic lithologies

Location
- Coordinates: 31.831°N 108.452°W
- Region: New Mexico
- Country: United States

Type section
- Named for: Broken Jug Pass
- Named by: S.G. Lasky
- Year defined: 1938
- Broken Jug Formation (the United States) Broken Jug Formation (New Mexico)

The Broken Jug Formation is a geologic formation in southwestern New Mexico. It was likely deposited in the late Jurassic period.

== Description ==
The formation consists of a variety of marine, deltaic, and volcanic rocks. It is divided into five informal members. The lowest of these is the dolomite member, which consists of about 200 meters (660 ft) of thinly bedded dolomite and dolomitic sandstone. This rests disconformably on Paleozoic limestone, either the Escabrosa Limestone or the Horquilla Limestone. Above the dolomite member is the lower conglomerate member, which is about 200 meters (660 ft) of calcareous conglomerate, mudstone, and sandstone interpreted as turbidite formations. The third member is the fine-grained member, consisting of 367 meters (1,204 ft) varied sandstone, siltstone, and mudstone. Above this is the upper conglomerate member, which is 200 meters (660 ft) of thickly bedded clast-supported conglomerate. A number of diabase dikes and sills intrude the lower part of this member. Finally, the formation is capped with the basalt member, which is 234 meters (768 ft) of vesicular basalt in at least 11 separate flows.

The formation is thought to have been deposited in a subsiding marine basin (Bisbee basin), which was subsequently filled in by delta deposits and capped by subaerial silica-poor (mafic) lava flows. The formation is late Jurassic in age, based on fossils in the upper conglomerate member, the position of the formation in the stratigraphic column, and its similarity to nearby formations whose age is better constrained.

== Fossils ==
The lower conglomerate member contains abundant limestone fragments (clasts) that are fossiliferous and suggest the clasts came from Carboniferous to Permian beds. A fossil of Omphalotrochus in one such clast is characteristic of the early Permian. The fine-grained member is sparsely fossiliferous, containing shell fragments and forams that have been recrystallized to coarse-grained calcite. Age-diagnostic fossils are present near the base of the upper conglomerate member, including the bivalve mollusc Gryphaea mexicana, gastropods (Nerineidae) and the coral Thamnasteria.

== History of investigation ==
The formation was first defined by S.G. Lasky in 1938 for exposures at Broken Jug Pass in the Little Hatchet Mountains of New Mexico. R.A. Zeller, Jr., assigned these beds to the Hell-to-Finish Formation or Mojado Formation in 1970, but the formation was redefined by T.F. Lawton in 1998 and continues in use.

== See also ==
- List of fossiliferous stratigraphic units in New Mexico
- Paleontology in New Mexico
