= Lowell Formation =

Geologic formation in Alaska

- Stratigraphic range: Aptian–Albian ref
- Type: Formation
- Unit of: Bisbee Group
- Sub-units: Pacheta, Joserita, Saavedra, Cholla, Quajote
- Underlies: Mural Limestone
- Overlies: Morita Formation
- Thickness: Several hundred meters (variable)

Lithology
- Primary: Sandstone, shale
- Other: Limestone (subordinate)

Location
- Region: Southeastern Arizona
- Country: United States
- Extent: Bisbee Basin region

Type section
- Named for: Lowell, Arizona
- Named by: Alexander A. Stoyanow, 1949

The Lowell Formation is an Early Cretaceous fossil-bearing unit in Arizona.

The formation is transitional, lower portions interfinger with the upper Morita Formation, while its upper contact is marked with a change into the more uniform, marine Mural Limestone. Its lithology is characterized as a heterogeneous succession of interbedded sandstone, shale, and subordinate limestone, deposited in a predominantly shallow-marine setting, and is variable both vertically and laterally, recording alternating episodes of repeated environmental shifts during the early Cretaceous.

Fossil content, particularly marine invertebrates such as ammonoids and foraminifera, indicates an Aptian–Albian age for the formation as a whole. These faunas support correlation with other Lower Cretaceous marine units of the southwestern United States and northern Mexico.

== See also ==
- List of fossiliferous stratigraphic units in Arizona
- Paleontology in Arizona
