= La Tuna Formation =

Geologic formation

- Stratigraphic range: Bashkirian
- Type: Formation
- Underlies: Berino Formation
- Overlies: Rancheria Formation, Helms Formation
- Thickness: 340–423 ft (104–129 m)

Lithology
- Primary: Limestone
- Other: Chert, shale

Location
- Coordinates: 31°58′0″N 106°31′30″W
- Region: New Mexico
- Country: United States

Type section
- Named for: La Tuna (Anthony, New Mexico)
- Named by: L.A. Nelson
- Year defined: 1937
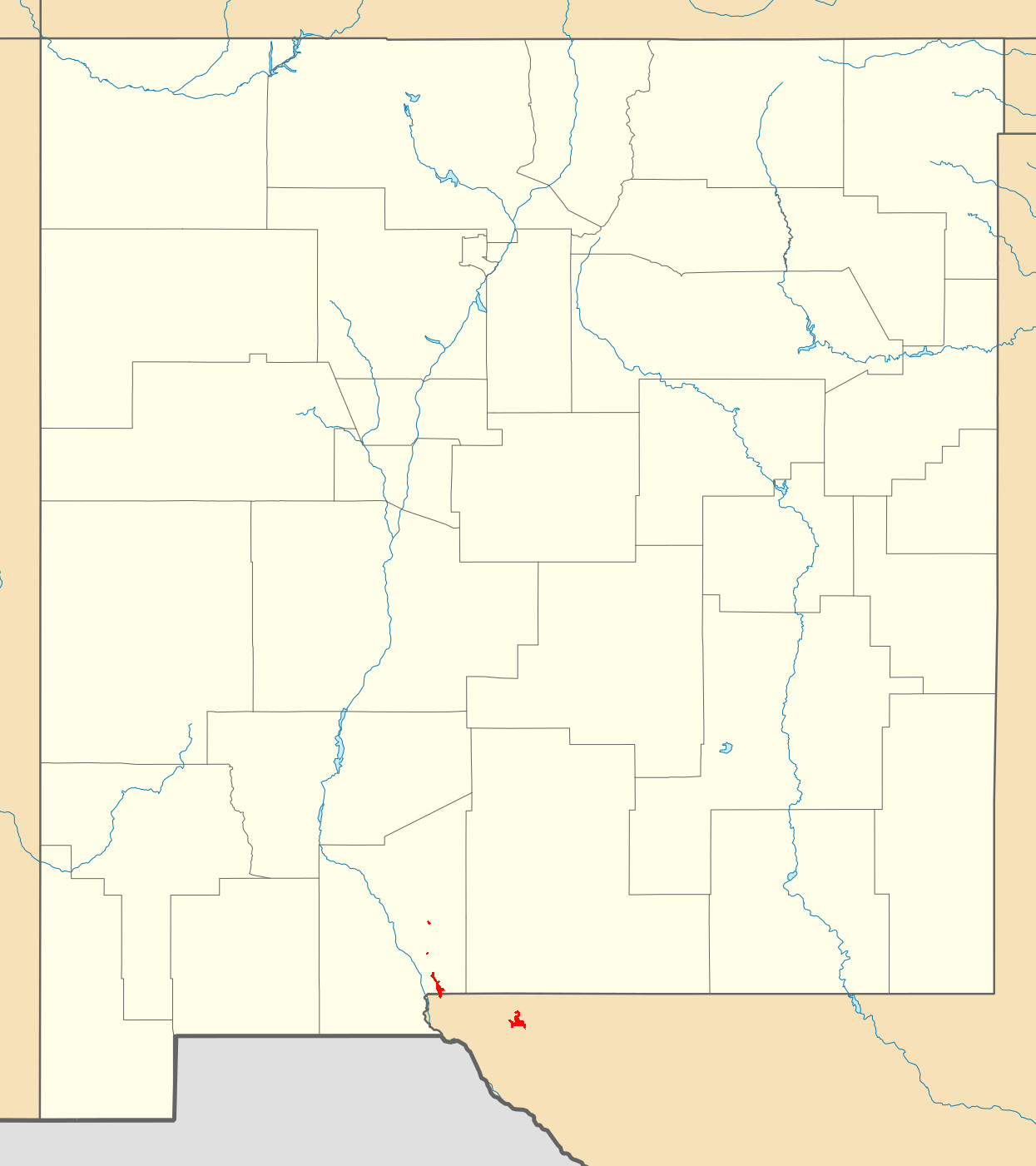
- La Tuna Formation (the United States) La Tuna Formation (New Mexico)

The La Tuna Formation is a geologic formation in the Franklin Mountains of southern New Mexico and western Texas and the Hueco Mountains of western Texas. It preserves fossils dating back to the Bashkirian Age of the early Pennsylvanian.

== Description ==
The unit consists mostly of massive gray limestone with minor interbedded shale. The limestone is locally cherty and the upper beds include some thin shale lenses and algal mounds. The total thickness is 340–423 ft (104–129 m). The formation lies on the Helms Formation or Rancheria Formation and is overlain by the Berino Formation.

The formation contains detrital zircon grains of Cambrian age, which provides supporting evidence for a landmass thought to be present in Pennsylvanian time in the location of the modern Florida Mountains. It is thought to have been laid down in the Horquilla Seaway, a continental shelf environment on the southwest coast of Pangaea.

== Fossils ==
The formation contains crinoids and other fossils consistent with deposition in the Morrowan (Bashkirian). The upper beds include some algal mounds. The formation contains a diverse gastropod fauna, as well as the foraminiferan Millerella, the demosponge Chaetetes. and the coral Petalaxis. The base of the formation contains earliest Morrowan conodonts. The red alga Masloviporidium delicatum has been reported in the formation. Cordaites has been reported within a sandstone bed within the formation.

== History of investigation ==
The unit was designated the La Tuna Member of the Magdalena Group by L.A. Nelson in 1937. In 2001, B. Kues recommended abandoning the Magdalena Group and raising its members, including the La Tuna, to formation rank. Spencer G. Lucas and Karl Krainer have recommended demoting the La Tuna Formation in New Mexico to member rank within the Horquilla Formation.

== See also ==
- List of fossiliferous stratigraphic units in New Mexico
- Paleontology in New Mexico
