= 1990 in paleontology =

Paleontology or palaeontology is the study of prehistoric life forms on Earth through the examination of plant and animal fossils. This includes the study of body fossils, tracks (ichnites), burrows, cast-off parts, fossilised feces (coprolites), palynomorphs and chemical residues. Because humans have encountered fossils for millennia, paleontology has a long history both before and after becoming formalized as a science. This article records significant discoveries and events related to paleontology that occurred or were published in the year 1990.

== Plants ==
=== Conifers ===
==== Pinaceae ====
Name	Novelty	Status	Authors	Age	Unit	Location	Synonymized taxa	Notes	Images
Abies rigida	Syn nov	valid	Knowlton	Oligocene; Chattian	Creede Formation	US; Colorado	Abies longirostris (1923)	A possible bristlecone fir species	Abies rigida
Pinus crossii	Syn nov	Valid	Knowlton	Oligocene; Chattian	Creede Formation	US; Colorado	Pinus aristata fossilis(1934); Pinus coloradensis (1923); Pinus similis (1923); Pinus wasonii (1987)	A bristle cone pine species	

=== Angiosperms ===
==== Basal eudicots ====
Name	Novelty	Status	Authors	Age	Type locality	Location	Synonymized taxa	Notes	Images
Berberis coloradensis	Syns nov	Valid	Axelrod	Oligocene; Chattian	Creede Formation	US; Colorado	synonymy: Berberis riogrande (1987); Fendlera coloradensis p.p. (1987); Philadelphus creedensis (1987); Vaccinium creedensis (1987)	A barberry species	
Mahonia aceroides	Comb et syn nov	valid	(Knowlton) Schorn & Wolfe	Oligocene; Chattian	Creede Formation	US; Colorado	synonymy: Mahonia creedensis (1956); Mahonia hakeaefolia p.p. (1936); Mahonia marginata p.p. (1936)	An Mahonia species Moved from Sterculia aceroides (1923)	

==== Superroids ====
===== Malpighiales =====
Name	Novelty	Status	Authors	Age	Type locality	Location	Synonymized taxa	Notes	Images
Populus larsenii	Comb et syn nov	valid	(Knowlton) Schorn & Wolfe	Oligocene; Chattian	Creede Formation	US; Colorado	synonymy: Betula smithiana p.p. 1987; Populus cedrusensis auct. non Wolfe, nec Axelrod, 1987; Populus creedensis (1987); Populus lesquereuxi auct. non Cockerell, nec Knowlton, 1923; Populus pliotremuloides auct. non Axelrod, 1937 nec Axelrod, 1987	First identified as a possible Alder species Moved from Alnus? larseni (1923)	

== Paleomycology ==
=== newly named fungi ===
Name	Novelty	Status	Authors	Age	Type unit	Location	Notes	Images
Coprinites	Gen et sp nov	Valid	Poinar & Singer	Burdigalian	Dominican amber.	Dominican Republic	first mushroom genus described from the fossil record	

== Arthropods ==
=== Newly named crustaceans ===
Name	Novelty	Status	Authors	Age	Type unit	Location	Notes	Images
Orbitoplax	Gen. et sp. nov	Valid	Tucker & Feldmann	Early Oligocene	Poul Creek Formation	USA (Alaska)	A euryplacid crab, type species is O. plafkeri.	

=== Newly named insects ===
Name	Novelty	Status	Authors	Age	Type unit	Location	Notes	Images
Casaleia	Gen nov	valid	Pagliano & Scaramozzino	Middle Miocene	Chon-Tyz mine	Kyrgyzstan	A replacement name for "Protamblyopone" Dlussky 1981.	Casaleia eocenica
Paleochrysopa	Gen et sp nov	valid	Séméria & Nel	Priabonian	Monteils Formation	France	A green lacewing. The type species is P. monteilsensis	Paleochrysopa monteilsensis
Tetraponera klebsi	Comb nov	Valid	(Wheeler)	Lutetian	Baltic amber	Europe	A pseudomyrmecine ant. Moved from Sima klebsi (Wheeler, 1915)	Tetraponera klebsi

== Vertebrates ==
=== Conodonts ===
Name	Novelty	Status	Authors	Age	Type unit	Location	Notes	Images
Chiosella	Gen nov	Valid	Kozur					
Clarkina	Gen nov	Valid	Kozur					

=== Newly named Actinopterygii ("Ray-finned Fish") ===
Name	Novelty	Status	Authors	Age	Type unit	Location	Notes	Images
Veronavelifer	Gen et sp nov	Valid	Bannikov	Eocene	Monte Bolca	Italy		Veronavelifer sorbinii

=== Pseudosuchians ===
Name	Novelty	Status	Authors	Age	Type locality	Country	Notes	Images
Baru darrowi	Gen. et sp. nov	Valid	Willis, Murray & Megirian	Miocene	Bullock Creek	Australia	A mekosuchine crocodilian. Originally material from the Riversleigh WHA was also assigned to this species, but later research found these fossils to have belonged to a distinct taxon.	

=== Dinosaurs ===
- All Anatosaurus species except A. copei were moved to the previously existing genus Edmontosaurus by Brett-Surman
- "Seismosaurus" gastroliths documented.

==== Newly named dinosaurs ====
Data courtesy of George Olshevsky's dinosaur genera list.

Name	Status	Authors		Location	Images
Agilisaurus	Valid taxon	Peng G.		China	Agilisaurus
Anatotitan	Junior synonym of Edmontosaurus.	Brett-Surman vide: Chapman	Michael K. Brett-Surman	Canada; (Alberta)	Anatotitan copei
Bellusaurus	Valid taxon	Dong Zhiming		China	Bellusaurus
Breviceratops	Valid taxon	Kurzanov		Mongolia	
Coloradisaurus	Valid taxon	Peter Galton		Argentina	Coloradisaurus
Drinker	Junior synonym of Nanosaurus.	Robert Bakker; Galton	Siegwarth; Filla	USA (Wyoming)	
Emausaurus	Valid taxon	Haubold		Germany	
Epachthosaurus	Valid taxon	Jaime Eduardo Powell		Argentina	Epachthosaurus
"Futabasaurus"	Nomen nudum; later applied to a plesiosaur.	David Lambert		Japan	
"Hadrosauravus"	Nomen nudum	David Lambert		USA; (Montana, Utah): Canada	
"Hisanohamasaurus"	Nomen nudum	David Lambert		Japan	
"Katsuyamasaurus"	Nomen nudum	David Lambert			
"Kitadanisaurus"	Nomen nudum	David Lambert			
"Madsenius"	Nomen nudum	David Lambert		USA	
Monkonosaurus	Valid taxon	Zhao X. vide: Dong Zhiming		China	
Richardoestesia	Valid taxon	Phillip Currie; Rigby and	R.E. Sloan	Canada (Alberta); USA (Montana, New Mexico, North Dakota, South Dakota, Texas, Utah and Wyoming)	
"Sugiyamasaurus"	Nomen nudum	David Lambert			
Yimenosaurus	Valid taxon	Bai vide: Bai; Yang J.	Wang G.H.	China	

==== Newly named birds ====
Name	Status	Novelty	Authors	Age	Unit	Location	Notes	Images
Agnopterus sicki	Valid	Sp. nov.	Herculano M. F. de Alvarenga	Late Oligocene / Early Miocene	Bacia de Taubate	Brazil	A Phoenicopteriformes, Agnopteridae Lambrecht, 1933.	
Anser arenosus	Valid	Sp. nov.	K. Jeffrey Bickart	Late Miocene	Late Hemphillian, Big Sandy Formation	USA: Arizona	An Anatidae.	
Anser arizonae	Valid	Sp. nov.	K. Jeffrey Bickart	Late Miocene	Late Hemphillian, Big Sandy Formation	USA: Arizona	An Anatidae.	
Brachyramphus dunkeli	Valid	Sp. nov.	Robert M. Chandler	Late Pliocene	Blancan, San Diego Formation	USA: California	An Alcidae.	
Branta woolfendeni	Not Valid	Sp. nov.	K. Jeffrey Bickart	Late Miocene	Late Hemphillian, Big Sandy Formation	Mongolia; USA: Arizona	An Anatidae, placed in synonymy with Bonibernicla ponderosa Kurochkin, 1985 by Zelenkov, 2012.	
Cerorhinca reai	Valid	Sp. nov.	Robert M. Chandler	Late Pliocene	Blancan, San Diego Formation	USA: California	An Alcidae.	
Chlamydotis mesetaria	Valid	Sp. nov.	Antonio Sanchez Marco	Early Pliocene	MN 15	Spain: Castile and León	An Otididae.	
Corvus galushai	Valid	Sp. nov.	K. Jeffrey Bickart	Late Miocene	Late Hemphillian, Big Sandy Formation	USA: Arizona	A Corvidae.	
Cygnus mariae	Valid	Sp. nov.	K. Jeffrey Bickart	Late Miocene	Late Hemphillian, Big Sandy Formation	USA: Arizona	An Anatidae.	
Diomedea howardae	Valid	Sp. nov.	Robert M. Chandler	Late Pliocene	Marine Beds	USA: California	A Diomedeidae.	
Himantopus olsoni	Valid	Sp. nov.	K. Jeffrey Bickart	Late Miocene	Late Hemphillian, Big Sandy Formation	USA: Arizona	A Recurvirostridae	
"Ichthyornis" minusculus	Valid	Sp. nov.	Lev A. Nessov	Late Eocene	Coniacian, Bisekty Formation	Uzbekistan	Possibly an Enantiornithes Walker, 1981.	
Kievornis rogovitshi	Valid	Gen. nov. et Sp. nov.	Alexander O. Averianov Olga R. Potapova Lev A. Nessov	Late Eocene	MP 17-20	Ukraine	An Aves Incertae Sedis, possibly a Procelariiformes or a Phaethontidae, this is the type species of the new genus.	
Melanitta ceruttii	Valid	Sp. nov.	Robert M. Chandler	Late Pliocene	Blancan, San Diego Formation	USA: California	An Anatidae, transferred to the genus Histrionicus Lesson, 1828 by Storrs L. Olson & Pamela C. Rasmussen, 2001	
Palaeeudyptes klekowskii	Valid	Sp. nov.	Andrezej Myrcha Andrzej Tatur Rodolfo Del Valle	Late Eocene	La Meseta Formatie on Seymour Island	Antarctica	A Spheniscidae.	
Podiceps arndti	Valid	Sp. nov.	Robert M. Chandler	Late Pliocene	Blancan, San Diego Formation	USA: California	A Podicipedidae.	
Puffinus gilmorei	Valid	Sp. nov.	Robert M. Chandler	Late Pliocene	Marine Beds	USA: California	A Procellariidae.	
Puffinus holei	Valid	Sp. nov.	Cyril A. Walker Graham M. Wragg Colin J. O. Harrison	Late Pleistocene MQ 2C; Late Pleistocene MQ 2C-D; Early Holocene MQ 2E	Portugal, Spain: Fuerteventura and Lanzarote, Portugal	Portugal; Spain: Canary Islands	A Procellariidae, Mourer-Chauviré & Antunes, 2000 emended the spelling to Puffinus holeae.	
Puffinus olsoni	Valid	Sp. nov.	Miquel McMinn Damià Jaume Josep A. Alcover	Holocene	Fuerteventura	Spain: Canary Islands	A Procellariidae.	
Rissa estesi	Valid	Sp. nov.	Robert M. Chandler	Late Pliocene	Blancan, San Diego Formation	USA: California	A Laridae.	
Songzia heidangkouensis	Valid	Gen. nov. et Sp. nov.	Hou Lianhai	Early Eocene	Yangxi Formation	China	A Ralliformes, Songziidae Hou, 1990, this is the type species of the new genus.	
Stictocarbo kumeyaay	Valid	Sp. nov.	Robert M. Chandler	Late Pliocene	Blancan, San Diego Formation	USA: California	A Phalacrocoracidae, transferred to the genus Phalacrocorax Brisson, 1760.	
Sula clarki	Valid	Sp. nov.	Robert M. Chandler	Late Pliocene	Blancan, San Diego Formation	USA: California	A Sulidae.	
Struthio dmanisensis	Valid	Sp. nov.	Nikolay I. Burchak-Abramovich Abesalom K. Vekua	Early Pleistocene	Dmanisi	Georgia	A Struthionidae.	
Synthliboramphus rineyi	Valid	Sp. nov.	Robert M. Chandler	Late Pliocene	Blancan, San Diego Formation	USA: California	An Alcidae.	

=== Synapsids ===
==== Newly named mammals ====
Name	Novelty	Status	Authors	Age	Unit	Location	Notes	Images
Russellmys	Gen et sp nov	Valid	Estravís	Early Eocene	Silveirinha Formation	Portugal	An apatemyid, type species is R. denisae	
