= Chaotroquin =

Most important god in Huilliche religion

Chaotroquin or Chaotrokin (also known as Chaw Trokin, Chao God or God Trokin in the Huilliche mythology of Chile), is the most important god in Huilliche religion; he belongs to the Mapuche culture and is equivalent to the god Ngenechen of the Mapuche religion.

According to tradition, it was he who created his people. Chaotroquin is considered the father of justice, and he who provides food. To supplicate and/or thank the God Chaotroquin; the Huilliche people pray for the aid and intervention of the "Grandpa Wenteyao spirit" ("espíritu del abuelito Huenteao" in Spanish).
