= Muddy Creek Formation =

Neogene geologic formation in the Southwest United States

- Stratigraphic range: Neogene
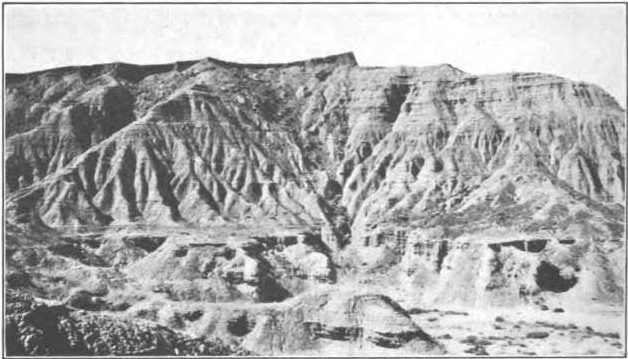
- Muddy Creek Formation. Gravel opening at top. Height of section about 200 feet.
- Type: Sedimentary
- Sub-units: Fortification Basalt Member (AZ, NV), Hualapai Limestone Member (AZ).
- Overlies: Horse Spring Formation

Location
- Region: Arizona, California, Nevada, Utah
- Country: United States

Type section
- Named for: Muddy Creek
- Named by: Chester Stock (1921)

The Muddy Creek Formation is a geologic formation in Arizona, California, Nevada, and Utah. It preserves fossils dating back to the Neogene period.

== Distribution and General Expression ==
The following description is from USGS Bulletin 798 by C. R. Longwell in 1928:

In all the large intermontane valleys adjacent to the Muddy Mountains and neighboring ranges there are thick clays or silts and associated deposits that have been relatively little disturbed by crustal deformation. As a rule they form belts from a fraction of a mile to several miles wide on each side of present stream valleys, above which the clay outcrops rise to a maximum height of approximately 600 feet. Adjacent to the high lands they feather out, lapping up on the older rocks. Between the Muddy and Virgin Mountains the area occupied by the clays is from 9 to 12 miles wide. South of St. Thomas this large area is divided into two nearly equal belts by Virgin River, and to the north the clays are cut by the converging Muddy and Virgin Valleys, each of which leaves a comparatively narrow strip of the deposits bordering the mountains. Between the streams the clays occupy a large triangular area extending more than 15 miles to the Mormon Mountains. In California Wash, the clay exposures extend a maximum of more than 10 miles to the ranges on the west, and they form wide belts bordering Meadow Valley Wash and the upper part of Muddy Creek. They have invaded St. Thomas Gap in places, and in the broad Grand Wash Valley they are exposed wherever the surface waste has been sufficiently dissected. In a word, the intermontane areas occupied by clays are nearly equal to the areas of the mountain ranges. However, these broad belts do not show continuous clay outcrops, for the clays are largely covered by a veneer of varying thickness formed from more recent waste that was used in building aggradation levels at several altitudes. The clays are conspicuous beneath the waste in the sides of the large valleys and small washes and in extensive badland tracts where the later capping has been stripped away.

Owing to many interbedded layers of sandstone more or less firmly cemented, the clays tend to stand in steep fronts along wash courses. The edges of the sandy layers are visible in all sections, standing out as narrow shelves or forming a horizontal banding almost concealed by clay carried from above and plastered on the slope by infrequent rains. In detail the carved surfaces have an intricate but typical pattern, many times repeated. Steep slopes are dissected into long parallel spurs, and these subdivide repeatedly into steep spurs of many orders, all with rounded upper surfaces and separated by V-shaped trenches. From a distance the spurs resemble irregular columns. In places they are interrupted by persistent shelves formed on sandstone layers of unusual resistance, below which the typical patterns reappear.

== Gallery ==
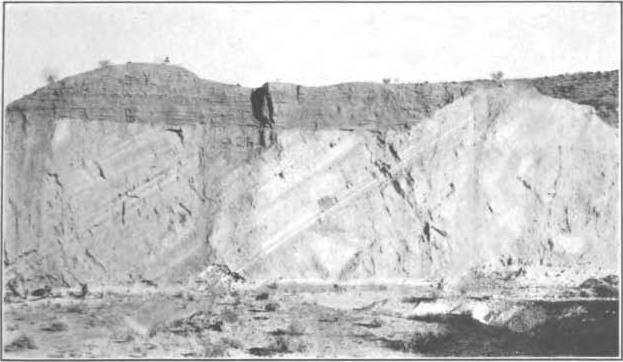
Unconformable contact between Muddy Creek Formation and Horse Spring Formation in Kaolin Wash.

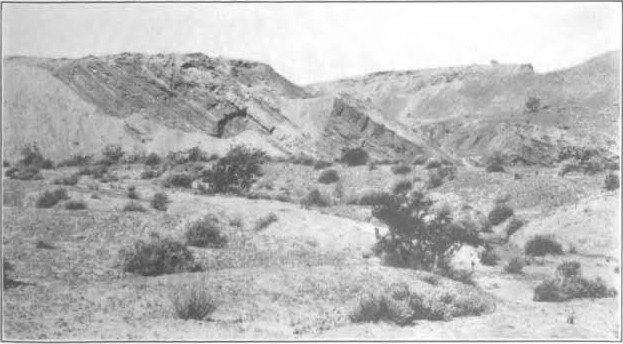
Tilted Muddy Creek Formation clays southwest of the ghost town of St. Thomas

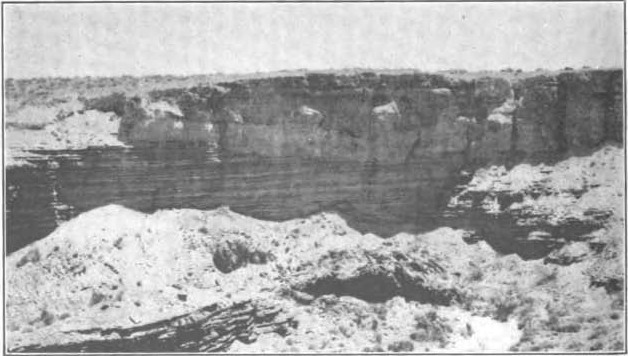
Terrace capping of gravel resting on Muddy Creek beds.

== See also ==
- List of fossiliferous stratigraphic units in Arizona
- Paleontology in Arizona
