= St. David Formation =

Geologic formation in Arizona

- Type: Formation

Location
- Region: Arizona
- Country: United States

The St. David Formation is a geologic formation in Arizona. It preserves fossils.

== See also ==
- List of fossiliferous stratigraphic units in Arizona
- Paleontology in Arizona
