= Fort Apache Formation =

Geologic formation in Arizona

- Stratigraphic range: Permian
- Type: Formation

Location
- Region: Arizona
- Country: United States

The Fort Apache Formation is a geologic formation in Arizona. It preserves fossils dating back to the Permian period.

== See also ==
- List of fossiliferous stratigraphic units in Arizona
- Paleontology in Arizona
