= Cerro Alto Mountain =

Mountain in Texas, United States

- Location within Texas

Highest point
- Elevation: 6,703 ft (2,043 m)
- Prominence: 1,447 ft (441 m)
- Coordinates: 31°56′43″N 105°58′12″W

Geography
- Location: Hudspeth County, Texas, U.S.
- Parent range: Hueco Mountains
- Topo map: USGS Cerro Alto Mountain

Cerro Alto Mountain is a mountain in western Texas east of El Paso along U.S. Route 180. It is the highest point in the Hueco Mountains.

The awelo of the Tigua Indians is believed to reside near Cerro Alto Mountain. Which began during their arrival in the 17th century.

== See also ==
- Geography of Texas
