= Llesquehue River =

Llesquehue
- Native name: Río Llesquehue (Spanish)

Location
- Country: Chile

Physical characteristics
- Source
  - location: Coastal Precordillera
- Mouth
  - location: Pucatrihue, Chile, Pacific Ocean
  - coordinates: 40°32′15″S 73°42′49″W
  - elevation: 0 m (0 ft)

Llesquehue, along with the Contaco River, the two main rivers of San Juan de la Costa municipality in southern Chile. It runs from east to west and discharges into the Pacific Ocean at the hamlet and beach of Pucatrihue.

== See also ==
- List of rivers of Chile
