= Hueco Formation =

Geologic formation in west Texas, US

- Stratigraphic range: early Permian
- Type: Formation
- Underlies: Wilkie Ranch Formation
- Overlies: Panther Seep Formation
- Thickness: 5,000 feet (1,500 m)

Lithology
- Primary: Limestone
- Other: Shale, sandstone

Location
- Coordinates: 31.953°N 106.027°W
- Region: Texas
- Country: United States

Type section
- Named for: Hueco Mountains
- Named by: G.B. Richardson
- Year defined: 1904
- Hueco Formation (the United States) Hueco Formation (Texas)

The Hueco Formation is a geologic formation in west Texas and southern New Mexico. It preserves fossils dating back to the early Permian period.

== Description ==
The formation is composed most of massive gray fossiliferous limestone with some shale and sandstone, with a thickness in excess of 5,000 feet (1,500 m). It overlies the Panther Seep Formation with a slight disconformity, and its base is typically a thick biostromal limestone bed. The formation unconformably underlies the Wilkie Ranch Formation. It intertongues with the Abo Formation in the southern San Andres Mountains.

In the Robledo Mountains, the Hueco is promoted to group rank and divided into (in ascending stratigraphic order) the Shalem Colony, Community Pit, Robledo Mountains, and Apache Dam Formations. In the Hueco Mountains, the uppermost formation is the Alacran Mountain Formation.

The Hueco Formation is contemporary with the Abo Formation and represents continued marine sediment deposition south of the prograding Abo deltas.

== History of investigation ==
The formation was first defined by G.B. Richardson in 1904, but mistakenly thought to be Pennsylvanian in age. Nelson dated the formation as earliest Permian in the Franklin Mountains in 1940. Spencer G. Lucas et al. promoted the formation to group rank in 1998.

== See also ==
- List of fossiliferous stratigraphic units in Texas
- Paleontology in Texas

== Bibliography ==
- Cys, J.M. (1976). "Wilkie Ranch Formation, new Permian unit in Finlay Mountains, West Texas". American Association of Petroleum Geologists Bulletin. 60 (7): 1107–1110. doi:10.1306/C1EA3627-16C9-11D7-8645000102C1865D.
- Bachman, G.O.; Hayes, P.T. (1958). "Stratigraphy of Upper Pennsylvanian and Lower Permian rocks in the Sand Canyon area, Otero County, New Mexico". Geological Society of America Bulletin. 69 (6): 689–700. Bibcode:1958GSAB...69..689B. doi:10.1130/0016-7606(1958)69[689:SOUPAL]2.0.CO;2.
- Kelley, S.; Matheny, J.P. (1983). "Geology of Anthony quadrangle, Dona Ana County, New Mexico". New Mexico Bureau of Mines and Mineral Resources Geologic Map. 54.
- Kues, B.S.; Giles, K.A. (2004). "The late Paleozoic Ancestral Rocky Mountain system in New Mexico". In Mack, G.H.; Giles, K.A. (eds.). The geology of New Mexico. A geologic history: New Mexico Geological Society Special Volume 11. pp. 95–136. ISBN 9781585460106.
- Lucas, Spencer G.; Heckert, Andrew B.; Estep, John W.; Cook, Casey W. (1998). "Stratigraphy of the lower Permian Hueco Group in the Robledo Mountains, Dona Ana County, New Mexico" (PDF). New Mexico Museum of Natural History Bulletin. 12.
- Nelson, L.A. (1940). "Paleozoic stratigraphy of the Franklin Mountains, West Texas". American Association of Petroleum Geologists Bulletin. 24 (1): 157–172. doi:10.1306/3D93319A-16B1-11D7-8645000102C1865D.
- Richardson, G.B. (1904). "Report of a reconnaissance in Trans-Pecos Texas north of the Texas and Pacific Railway". University of Texas Mineral Survey Bulletin. 9. hdl:2152/24408.
- Richardson, G B. (Jun 1908). "Paleozoic Formations in Trans-Pecos Texas". American Journal of Science. 25 (150): 474. Bibcode:1908AmJS...25..474R. doi:10.2475/ajs.s4-25.150.474.
- Richardson, G.B. (1914). "Description of the Van Horn quadrangle, Texas". U.S. Geological Survey Geologic Atlas of the United States. Van Horn folio (194).
- Williams, T.E. (1963). "Fusulinidae of the Hueco Group (Lower Permian), Hueco Mountains, Texas". Peabody Museum of Natural History Bulletin. 18.
