= Amole Arkose =

Geologic formation in Arizona, United States

- Stratigraphic range: Cretaceous
- Type: Formation

Location
- Region: Arizona
- Country: United States

The Amole Arkose is a geologic formation in Arizona. It preserves fossils dating back to the Cretaceous period.

== See also ==
- List of fossiliferous stratigraphic units in Arizona
- Paleontology in Arizona
