= Martin Formation =

Geological formation in Arizona

- Stratigraphic range: Devonian
- Type: Formation

Location
- Region: Arizona
- Country: United States

The Martin Formation is a geologic formation in Arizona. It preserves fossils dating back to the Devonian period.

== See also ==
- List of fossiliferous stratigraphic units in Arizona
- Paleontology in Arizona
