= Colina Formation =

Geographic formation in Arizona and Mexico

- Stratigraphic range: Permian
- Type: Formation

Location
- Region: Arizona
- Country: United States; Mexico

The Colina Formation is a geologic formation in Arizona and Mexico. It preserves fossils dating back to the Permian period.

== See also ==
- List of fossiliferous stratigraphic units in Arizona
- List of fossiliferous stratigraphic units in Mexico
- Paleontology in Arizona
