= Onyx marble =

Onyx marble may refer to:

- Onyx Marble, a geologic formation in Arizona
- Various rocks and minerals known as onyx marble

- Alabaster
- Calcareous sinter
- Limescale

== See also ==
- Onyx
- Marble
