= Awelo =

The awelo (derived from Spanish abuelo, meaning "grandfather") is the religious supernatural tribal protector that embodies the essence of the Tigua Indians. The awelo is similar to the kachinas found in other Puebloan societies. The awelo monitors the conduct of tribal members by punishing those who behave incorrectly. The awelo is believed to live near Cerro Alto Mountain. The awelo is represented by grandfather and grandmother buffalo masks, which are fed with smoke.

== See also ==
- Grandpa Wenteyao
