= Cintura Formation =

Geographic formation in Arizona

- Stratigraphic range: Albian–Cenomanian
- Type: Geological formation
- Unit of: Bisbee Group
- Sub-units: Marquechi, San Marcos and San Juan Member
- Thickness: 1,146 meters

Location
- Region: Arizona and Sonora
- Country: United States, Mexico

Type section
- Named by: Ransome
- Year defined: 1904

The Cintura Formation is a geologic formation in the northeastern Sonora of Arizona and Mexico. It preserves fossils dating back to the Cretaceous period.

== Description ==
The Cintura Formation is divided into 3 stratigraphic members which represent deltaic depositional elements: the basal Marquechi Member, medial San Marcos Member and the uppermost San Juan Member. The delta is thought to have prograded southward and have an immediate source to its north based on paleocurrents and provenance data.

== Fossil content ==
Dinoflagellates
Genus	Species	Presence	Material	Notes	Images
Oligosphaeridium	O. sp.	Base of the Marquechi Member.	Dinoflagellate cysts.		

Plants
Genus	Species	Presence	Material	Notes	Images
cf. Acanthotriletes	cf. A. varispinosus	Base of the Marquechi Member.	Spores.		
Alisporites	A. sp.	Base of the Marquechi Member.	Pollen grains.		
Araliaephyllum	A. silvapinedae	Near the town of Cabullona, Sonora, Mexico.	A trilobed leaf.	A laurale.	
Baculatisporites	B. sp.	Base of the Marquechi Member.	Spores.		
Cicatricosisporites	C. hallei	Base of the Marquechi Member.	Spores.	A schizaeacean fern.	
Cicatricosisporites	C. sp.	Base of the Marquechi Member.	Spores.	A schizaeacean fern.	
Classopollis	C. spp.	Base of the Marquechi Member.	Pollen grains.	A cheirolepidiaceaen conifer.	
Clavatipollenites	C. tenellis	Base of the Marquechi Member.	Pollen grains.		
Cycadopites	C. sp.	Base of the Marquechi Member.	Pollen grains.		
Deltoidospora	D. sp.	Base of the Marquechi Member.	Spores.		
Ephedripites	E. sp.	Base of the Marquechi Member.	Pollen grains.		
Exesipollenites	E. tumulus	Base of the Marquechi Member.	Pollen grains.		
Inaperturopollenites	I. sp.	Base of the Marquechi Member.	Pollen grains.	A conifer.	
Isoetites	I. sp.	San Juan Member.	Leaves.	An isoetalean.	
Leptolepidites	L. sp. 1	Base of the Marquechi Member.	Spores.	A fern.	
Leptolepidites	L. sp. 2	Base of the Marquechi Member.	Spores.	A fern.	
Leptolepidites	L. sp. 3	Base of the Marquechi Member.	Spores.	A fern.	
Osmundacites	O. wellmanii	Base of the Marquechi Member.	Spores.		
Ovoidites	O. parvus	Base of the Marquechi Member.	Spores.	An aquatic zygnematale.	
Patellasporites	P. sp.	Base of the Marquechi Member.	Spores.		
Perinopollenites	P. sp.	Base of the Marquechi Member.	Pollen grains.		
Peromonolites	P. allensis	Base of the Marquechi Member.	Spores.	A fern.	
Pityosporites	P. sp.	Base of the Marquechi Member.	Pollen grains.		
Plicatella	P. potomacensis	Base of the Marquechi Member.	Spores.		
Raistrickia	R. sp.	Base of the Marquechi Member.	Spores.		
Retimonocopites	R. sp. 1	Base of the Marquechi Member.	Pollen grains.		
Retimonocopites	R. sp. 2	Base of the Marquechi Member.	Pollen grains.		
Spheripollenites	S. sp.	Base of the Marquechi Member.	Pollen grains.		
Taxodiaceaepollenites	T. hiatus	Base of the Marquechi Member.	Pollen grains.		
Todisporites	T. minor	Base of the Marquechi Member.	Spores.		
Triporoletes	T. sp. cf. T. radiatus	Base of the Marquechi Member.	Spores.	A bryopsid.	
Tucanopollis	T. sp.	Base of the Marquechi Member.	Pollen grains.		
Undulatisporites	U. undulapolus	Base of the Marquechi Member.	Spores.		
Undulatisporites	U. sp.	Base of the Marquechi Member.	Spores.		

== See also ==
- List of fossiliferous stratigraphic units in Arizona
- Paleontology in Arizona
