= Horse Spring Formation =

Geologic formation in Nevada, United States

- Stratigraphic range: Neogene
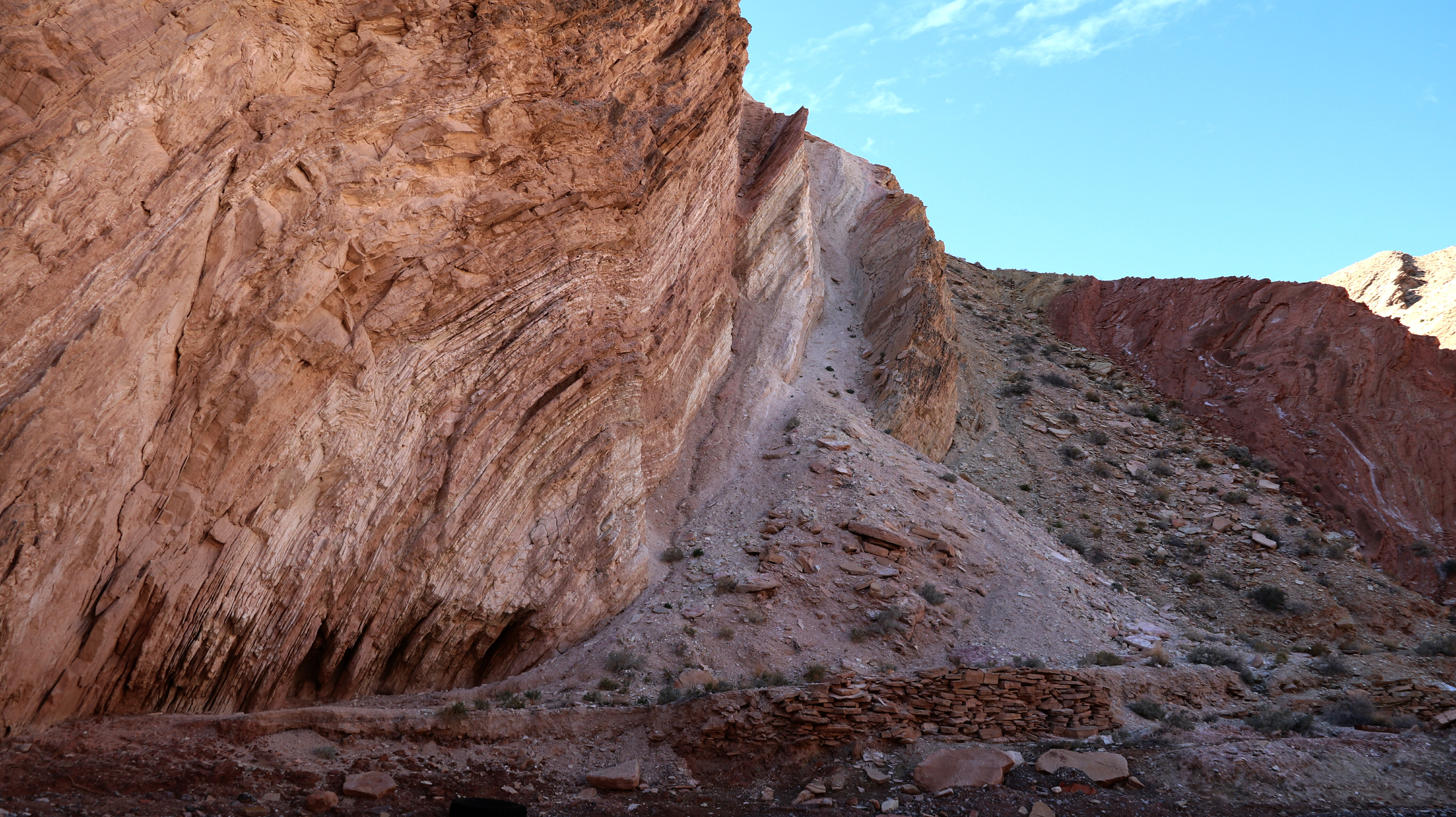
- Horse Spring Formation with stromatolite fossils
- Type: Sedimentary
- Sub-units: Lovell Wash member, Bitter Ridge Limestone, Thumb member, Rainbow Gardens member
- Underlies: Muddy Creek Formation

Lithology
- Primary: conglomerate, sandstone, and limestone

Location
- Region: Nevada
- Country: United States

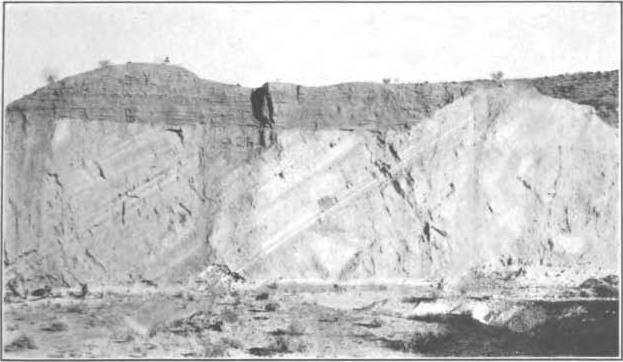
Muddy Creek Formation unconformably overlying the Horse Spring Formation in Nevada

The Horse Spring Formation is a geologic formation in Nevada. It preserves fossils dating back to the Neogene period. The lower unit is conglomerate and the middle and upper are sandstone and freshwater limestone.

== See also ==
- List of fossiliferous stratigraphic units in Nevada
- Paleontology in Nevada
