= Thumb member =

- Stratigraphic range: Neogene
- Type: Formation
- Unit of: Horse Spring Formation
- Underlies: Bitter Ridge Limestone
- Overlies: Rainbow Garden member

Lithology
- Primary: sandstone
- Other: conglomerate, gypsum

Location
- Coordinates: 36°37′30″N 114°56′45″W
- Region: Nevada
- Country: United States

Type section
- Named for: Thumb valley north of Lake Mead, Clark Co, NV
- Named by: Chester R. Longwell, 1952

The Thumb member of the Horse Spring Formation is a geologic member in Nevada. It contains sandstone with beds of conglomerate and gypsum in the Neogene period.
