= Quiburis Formation =

Geologic formation in Arizona, United States

- Stratigraphic range: Neogene
- Type: Formation

Location
- Region: Arizona
- Country: United States

The Quiburis Formation is a geologic formation in Arizona. It preserves fossils dating back to the Neogene period. It was entered into the National Register of Historic Places in 1971.

== See also ==
- List of fossiliferous stratigraphic units in Arizona
- Paleontology in Arizona
