= Contaco River =

River in Chile

Contaco
- Native name: Río Contaco (Spanish)

Location
- Country: Chile

Physical characteristics
- Source
  - location: Coastal Precordillera
- Mouth
  - location: Contaco, Chile, Pacific Ocean
  - coordinates: 40°33′33″S 73°43′2″W
  - elevation: 0 m (0 ft)

Contaco is together with Llesquehue River the two main rivers of San Juan de la Costa commune in southern Chile. It runs from east to west and discharges into the Pacific Ocean at the hamlet and beach of Contaco.

The Contaco originates in the Chilean Coastal Range with its source at an altitude of approximately 900 metres (3,000 ft) above sea level. It flows along a steep 48 kilometres (30 mi) watercourse before reaching the Pacific Ocean through an estuary with a 1.5-km salt wedge.
