= U-Bar Formation =

Geologic formation in New Mexico

- Stratigraphic range: Aptian–Albian
- Type: Formation
- Unit of: Bisbee Group
- Underlies: Mojado Formation
- Overlies: Hell-to-Finish Formation
- Thickness: 1,700–3,500 feet (520–1,070 m)

Lithology
- Primary: Limestone
- Other: Shale

Location
- Coordinates: 31.556°N 108.411°W
- Region: New Mexico
- Country: United States

Type section
- Named for: U-Bar Ranch
- Named by: R.A. Zeller Jr.
- Year defined: 1965
- U-Bar Formation (the United States) U-Bar Formation (New Mexico)

The U-Bar Formation is a geologic formation in southwestern New Mexico. It preserves fossils dating back to the early Cretaceous period.

== Description ==
The formation consists mostly of alternating beds of limestone and shale, but with massive upper reef limestone beds (varying from 20–500 feet (6.1–152.4 m) in thickness) and some massive calcarenite beds towards the middle of the formation. Its total thickness is 1,700–3,500 feet (520–1,070 m). The massive reef limestones cap ridges that are steep on one side but dip gently on the other. The formation has gradational contacts with both the underlying Hell-to-Finish Formation and the overlying Mojado Formation.

Although fossils are abundant, they tend not to be age-specific. However, careful study of the fossils has yielded an age of Aptian to middle Albian.

== Fossils ==
The lowest beds of the formation contain only small pelecypods, but abundant oyster fossils are found further up in the formation. The alternating shale and limestone beds contain fossil echinoids, the foraminifer Orbitolina, the gastropod Lunatia praegrandis Roemger, and small oysters. The upper part of the formation contains massive fossil bioherm reefs. Orbitolina is also found above the reef beds, in the uppermost part of the formation.

== History of investigation ==
The formation name was first used by Zeller in 1965. Drewes assigned the formation to the Bisbee Group in 1991.

== See also ==
- List of fossiliferous stratigraphic units in New Mexico
- Paleontology in New Mexico
