= Mural Limestone =

Geologic formation in Arizona and Mexico

- Stratigraphic range: Cretaceous
- Type: Formation
- Unit of: Bisbee Group

Location
- Region: Arizona
- Country: United States; Mexico

The Mural Limestone is a geologic formation of the Bisbee Group in Arizona and Mexico. It preserves fossils dating back to the Cretaceous period.

== See also ==
- List of fossiliferous stratigraphic units in Arizona
- List of fossiliferous stratigraphic units in Mexico
- Paleontology in Arizona
