= Bisbee Group =

Group of geologic formations in the USA and Mexico

- Stratigraphic range: Callovian–Albian
- Type: Group
- Sub-units: Glance Conglomerate, Morita Formation, Mural Limestone, Cintura Formation
- Underlies: Bronco Volcanics
- Overlies: Naco Formation
- Thickness: Over 1,770 meters (5,810 ft)

Lithology
- Primary: Sandstone, claystone, limestone
- Other: Conglomerate

Location
- Coordinates: 31.42°N 109.95°W
- Region: Arizona; New Mexico; Chihuahua
- Country: United States; Mexico

Type section
- Named by: E.T. Dumble
- Year defined: 1902
- Bisbee Group (the United States) Bisbee Group (Arizona)

The Bisbee Group is a geologic group in Arizona, Mexico, and New Mexico. It preserves fossils dating back to the early Cretaceous period.

== Description ==
The group consists of sandstone, claystone, limestone, and conglomerate, with a maximum thickness of 1,770 meters (5,810 ft) in the Chiricahua Mountains. In the Tombstone, Arizona, area, it overlies the Naco Formation. In the Bisbee area, the group is divided into four formations, which in ascending stratigraphic order are the Glance Conglomerate, the Morita Formation, the Mural Limestone, and the Cintura Formation. These extend into northern Sonora. The group is overlain by the Bronco Volcanics, the Nipper Formation, or the Faraway Ranch Formation.

In the Chiricahua Mountains, where the thickest section is found, the Crystal Cave Formation and Onion Saddle Formation are found between the Glance Conglomerate and the Morita Formation. A thrust fault has placed the lower Jurassic beds over the Cretaceous beds.

In southwestern New Mexico, the group thickens to 21,000 feet (6,400 m) and is divided into the Glance Conglomerate, the Hell-to-Finish Formation, the U-Bar Formation, and the Mojado Formation.

In northwestern Sonora, in addition to the Glance Conglomerate, the Morita Formation, the Mural Limestone, and the Cintura Formation, the group includes the Cerro de Oro Formation and Arroyo Sásabe Formation.

The group was deposited in the Bisbee basin, which was the central basin of the Jurassic-Cretaceous border rift belt. This rift belt was located between the Mogollon Highlands of central Arizona and New Mexico, which formed the northern shoulder of the belt, and Cordilleran (or Alisitos) volcanic arc along what is now the western side of the Gulf of California. Deposition began in the late Jurassic with the Glance Conglomerate. This was followed by at least three additional marine transgressions. The second of these was restricted to western Sonora and deposited the Cerro de Oro Formation. This was followed by deposition of typical fluvial, tidal flat, and delta deposits of the Morita Formation to the west and marine beds to the east. The third and largest incursion formed the lagoon belt of the Arroyo Sásabe Formation and the marine Mural Limestone. This was followed by delta deposits of the Cintura Formation. A final small fourth incursion affected only northeastern Sonora.

== Fossils ==
The group contains fossils such as the mollusc Exogyra and the clam Trigonia characteristic of the Cretaceous. The limestone formations contain fossils of scleractinian corals from a diversity of genera, including several species not found elsewhere.

== History of investigation ==
The Bisbee beds were first named by E.T. Dumble in 1902 for exposures around Bisbee, Arizona. In 1904, Frederick Leslie Ransome divided the Bisbee Group into formations in the Bisbee area. By 1938, the group had been mapped into the Tombstone, Arizona area and into southwestern New Mexico. Samuel G. Lasky defined several new formations within the group, but some of these were synonyms for each other due to fault doubling.

== See also ==
- List of fossiliferous stratigraphic units in Arizona
- List of fossiliferous stratigraphic units in Mexico
- Paleontology in Arizona
