= Contaco =

- Interactive map of Contaco
- Coordinates: 40°33′29″S 73°42′27″W
- Region: Los Lagos
- Province: Osorno
- Municipality: San Juan de la Costa
- Commune: San Juan de la Costa

Government
  - Type: Municipal
  - Alcade: Bernardo Candia Henríquez (DC)
- Elevation: 10 m (33 ft)

Population (2002)
  - Total: 130 (including Pucatrihue)
- Time zone: UTC−04:00 (Chilean Standard)
  - Summer (DST): UTC−03:00 (Chilean Daylight)
- Area code: Country + town = 56 + 64

Contaco is a small settlement, beach and balneario at the coast of Osorno Province, southern Chile. It is located south of Pucatrihue at the outflow of Contaco River into the Pacific Ocean.
