= Panther Seep Formation =

Geologic formation in New Mexico, US

- Stratigraphic range: Kasimovian–Cisuralian
- Type: Formation
- Underlies: Hueco Group
- Overlies: Lead Camp Limestone, Bishop Cap Formation
- Thickness: 200–2,640 ft (61–805 m)

Lithology
- Primary: Shale
- Other: Sandstone, limestone

Location
- Coordinates: 33°14′17″N 106°40′42″W
- Region: New Mexico
- Country: United States

Type section
- Named for: Panther Seep
- Named by: Kottlowski et al.
- Year defined: 1956
- Panther Seep Formation (the United States) Panther Seep Formation (New Mexico)

The Panther Seep Formation is a geologic formation found in the mountain ranges of south-central New Mexico. It preserves fossils dating back to the late Pennsylvanian to early Permian.

== Description ==
The formation is highly variable in lithology, consisting of interbedded black to reddish sandy, silty, or calcareous shale; brown to olive calcareous siltstone, brown to gray calcareous arkosic sandstone; gypsum; and gray argillaceous to silty limestone. It varies in thickness from 200–2,640 feet (61–805 m). It overlies the Lead Camp Limestone or Bishop Cap Formation and is overlain by the Hueco Group.

The unit likely correlates with Bar B Formation in the Caballo Mountains and the Holder Formation in the Sacramento Mountains.

== Fossils ==
The formation includes patch reefs and numerous fusulinids of Virgilian (Gzhelian) age. The formation also contains algae and some invertebrate fossils typical of the Virgilian. The lower beds may be Missourian (Kasimovian) in age while the uppermost beds may be Wolfcampian (Cisuralian) in age.

== History of investigation ==
The formation was first defined by F.E. Kottlowski and coinvestigators in 1956, who divided it into informal upper and lower members.

== See also ==
- List of fossiliferous stratigraphic units in New Mexico
- Paleontology in New Mexico
