= Lead Camp Limestone =

Geological formation in New Mexico, US

- Stratigraphic range: Bashkirian–Kasimovian
- Type: Formation
- Underlies: Panther Seep Formation
- Overlies: Lake Valley Limestone, Sandia Formation
- Thickness: 320–861 ft (98–262 m)

Lithology
- Primary: Limestone
- Other: Shale

Location
- Coordinates: 32.7337°N 106.5746°W
- Region: New Mexico
- Country: United States

Type section
- Named for: Lead Camp Canyon
- Named by: Bachman and Myers
- Year defined: 1969
- Lead Camp Limestone (the United States) Lead Camp Limestone (New Mexico)

The Lead Camp Limestone is a geologic formation in the San Andres Mountains of New Mexico. It preserves fossils dating back to the middle Pennsylvanian.

== Description ==
The Lead Camp Limestone consists of 75% medium- to dark-gray cherty limestone and 21-24% calcareous shale. The base of the formation contains minor sandstone and conglomerate. The limestone forms prominent cliffs capping the southern San Andres Mountains. The total thickness is 320–861 feet (98–262 m). The formation rests unconformably on the Lake Valley Limestone to the south and conformably on the Sandia Formation to the north.

Deposition began in the late Morrowan (Bashkirian) to the south, spread to the north in the Atokan (early Moscovian, and continued into the Missourian (Kasimovian) Age.

== Fossils ==
The formation contains marine fossils in the calcareous shale beds. It contains fusulinids characteristic of the middle Pennsylvanian.

== History of investigation ==
The formation was first defined by George Bachman and Donald Myers in 1969, for exposures near the confluence of Lead Camp and San Andres Canyons.

== See also ==
- List of fossiliferous stratigraphic units in New Mexico
- Paleontology in New Mexico
