= Helms Formation =

Geologic formation in Texas and New Mexico, US

- Stratigraphic range: Serpukhovian
- Type: Formation
- Underlies: La Tuna Formation
- Overlies: Rancheria Formation
- Thickness: 30 m (98 ft)

Lithology
- Primary: Shale
- Other: Sandstone, limestone

Location
- Coordinates: 31.768°N 106.026°W
- Region: Texas, New Mexico
- Country: United States

Type section
- Named for: Helms West Well
- Named by: J.W. Beede
- Year defined: 1920
- Helms Formation (the United States) Helms Formation (Texas)

The Helms Formation is a geologic formation in Texas and New Mexico. It preserves fossils dating back to the Chesterian (Serpukhovian) Age of the Carboniferous period.

== Description ==
At its type section in the Hueco Mountains, the formation consists of 30 meters (98 ft) of olive-gray shale, shaly sandstone, and dirty limestone. It is unconformably underlain by the Rancheria Formation and unconformably overlain by the La Tuna Formation. The formation also crops out in the Organ Mountains of New Mexico.

The formation is interpreted as having been deposited during a marine regression (withdrawal of the sea from the continent) to the south.

== Fossils ==
The formation contains fossils characteristic of the Chesterian (Serpukhovian) Age of the Carboniferous period. These include abundant specimens of the ostracod Graphiadactyllis arkansana, as well as specimens of the bryozoan Archimedes terebriformis, the echinoderm Pentremites, the brachiopods Composita subquadrata, Spiriferina transversa, Diaphragmus elegans, and several species of Dictyoclostus, and the trilobite Paladin helmensis.

== History of investigation ==
The formation was first designated as the Helms Group by J.W. Beeded in 1920 for outcrops near Helms Well West near the Hueco Mountains. The original definition included the entire set of beds between Silurian and Pennsylvanian in age. In 1949, L.R. Laudon and A.L. Bowsher restricted Helms Formation to only the uppermost beds of the original section.

== See also ==
- List of fossiliferous stratigraphic units in Texas
- Paleontology in Texas
