= Gila Group =

Geologic group in Arizona and New Mexico

- Stratigraphic range: Neogene; 12.1–1 Ma
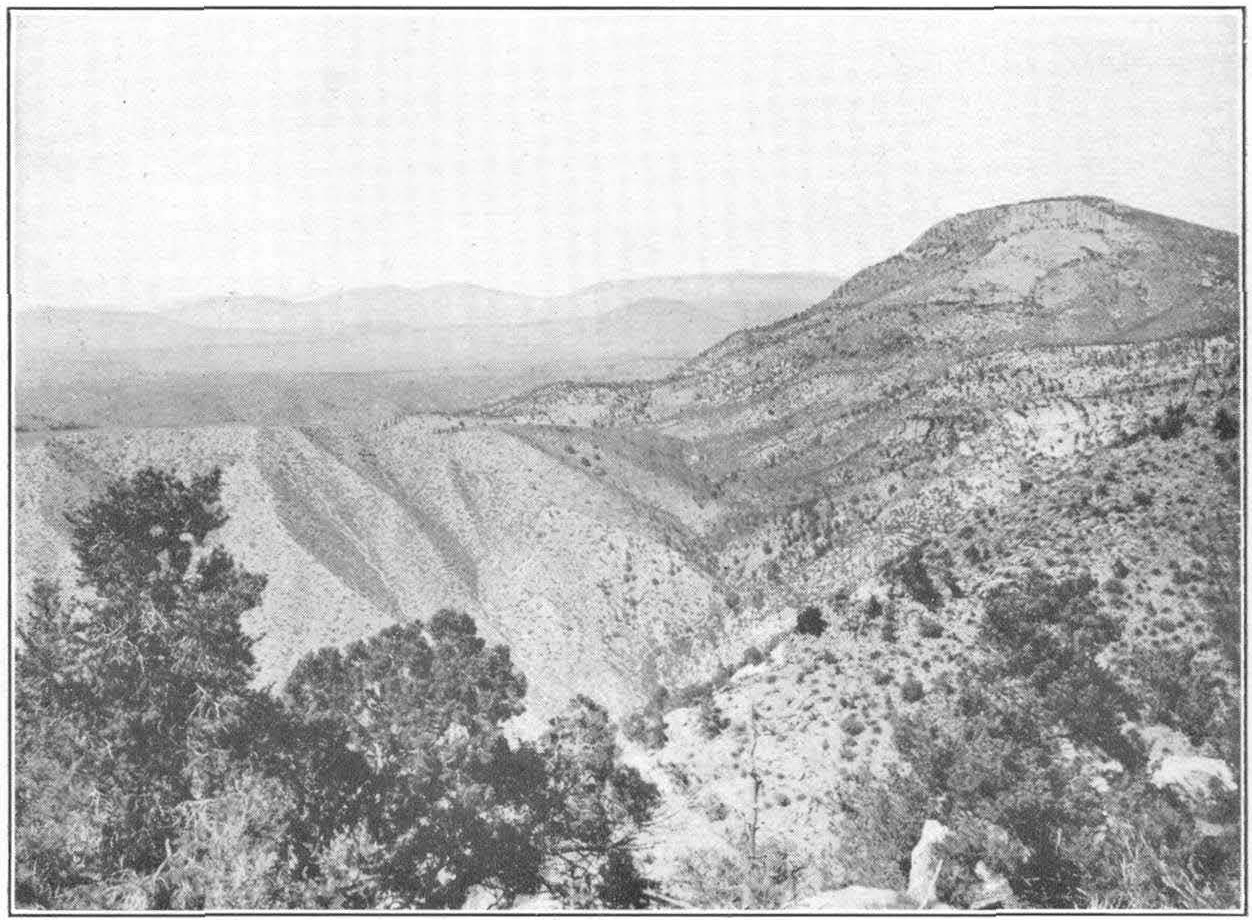
- Gila conglomerate (left) faulted against Tertiary lavas at Silver Peak, New Mexico, USA
- Type: Group
- Thickness: 1,000–1,500 ft (300–460 m)

Lithology
- Primary: Conglomerate
- Other: Sandstone, siltstone, basalt, dacite

Location
- Region: Arizona, New Mexico
- Country: United States

Type section
- Named for: Gila River
- Named by: G.K. Gilbert
- Year defined: 1875
- Gila Group (the United States) Gila Group (Arizona)

The Gila Group is a group of geologic formations found along the upper tributaries of the Gila River in Arizona and New Mexico. Radiometric dating of lava flows within the group yields an age of Miocene to Quaternary.

== Description ==
The group is primarily conglomerate composed of clasts (rock fragments) weathered from nearby outcrops. There are also occasional thin sandstone and tuff beds and basalt flows. Total thickness is 1,000–1,500 feet (300–460 m). Radiometric ages of basalt flows within the group range from 12.1 million years (Ma) to 1 Ma.

The group is similar in age and character to the Santa Fe Group. Both are sedimentary fill of extensional basins. The two groups are separated by the Continental Divide, and the Gila Group is separated from formations of similar age to the north by the Rim Divide, which separates the San Francisco and Salt River drainage basins to the south from the Little Colorado River drainage basin to the north.

== Fossils ==
The Gila Group has yielded a diversity of fossils at Pearson Mesa (32.643°N 108.968°W). These include four species of turtle, a heron, and fifteen mammal species. The latter includes the armadillo-like Glyptotherium arizonae, which is found in the southwestern United States only in beds of early Irvingtonian age.

== History of investigation ==
The unit was first named as the Gila Conglomerate by G.K. Gilbert in 1875 from his participation in the Wheeler Survey. Only a type area was defined. By 1903 F.L. Ransome had mapped the unit into the Globe area. P.A. Wood divided the unit into the Bonita beds, Solomonsville beds, and Frye Mesa beds in 1960. In 1963, L.A. Heindl raised the unit to group rank and divided it into the San Manuel, Quiburis, and Sacaton Formations, but M.H. Krieger and coinvestigators removed the San Manuel and Quiburis Formations from the Gila and abandoned the Sacaton Formation, restoring the Gila to formation rank. J.C. Ratte and coinvestigators redesignated the unit as the Gila Formation based on its diverse lithology.

Cather and his coinvestigators redefined the extent of the Gila Group in 1994 as part of a sweeping revision of stratigraphy in western New Mexico and eastern Arizona. They retain it at group rank.
