= Rancheria Formation =

Geologic formation in New Mexico and Texas, US

- Stratigraphic range: Visean
- Type: Formation
- Underlies: Helms Formation
- Overlies: Lake Valley Formation, Percha Formation
- Thickness: 255 ft (78 m)

Lithology
- Primary: Limestone
- Other: Chert

Location
- Coordinates: 31.9551°N 106.5143°W
- Region: New Mexico; Texas
- Country: United States

Type section
- Named for: Rancheria Peak
- Named by: Laudon and Bowsher
- Year defined: 1949
- Rancheria Formation (the United States) Rancheria Formation (Texas)

The Rancheria Formation is a geologic formation in the Sacramento and San Andres Mountains of New Mexico, the Franklin Mountains of southern New Mexico and western Texas, and the Hueco Mountains of western Texas. It preserves fossils dating back to the Visean Age of the Mississippian.

== Description ==
The formation consists mostly of dense carboniferous silty limestone containing considerable chert. The base of the formation is a few inches of shale and carboniferous quartz sandstone, followed by a few feet of yellow to brown sandy siltstone and a few feet of carboniferous limestone composed almost entirely of crinoid fragments. The total thickness is up to 255 feet (78 m). The formation lies on the Percha Formation or Lake Valley Limestone or, where these are not present, the Caballero Formation. It is overlain by the Helms Formation or Gobbler Formation or Permian formations.

The formation contains intraformational submarine erosional surfaces but relatively little slumping, indicating deposition on a deeply submerged stable basin floor.

== Fossils ==
The basal sandstone contains numerous plant fossils and the lower limestone is almost entirely crinoid fragments. The siltstone contains abundant brachiopods such as Leiorhynchus carboniferum.

== History of investigation ==
The Rancheria Formation was first described by Laudon and Bowsher in 1949. In 1977, Yurewicz argued for abandoning their underlying Las Cruces Formation and placing its beds in the Rancheria Formation.

== See also ==
- List of fossiliferous stratigraphic units in New Mexico
- Paleontology in New Mexico
