= Bishop Cap Formation =

Geologic formation in New Mexico and Texas, US

- Stratigraphic range: Moscovian–Kasimovian
- Type: Formation
- Underlies: Panther Seep Formation
- Overlies: Berino Formation
- Thickness: 180 m (590 ft)

Lithology
- Primary: Shale
- Other: Limestone

Location
- Coordinates: 31°58′0″N 106°31′30″W
- Region: New Mexico; Texas
- Country: United States

Type section
- Named for: Bishop Cap (mountain)
- Named by: L.A. Nelson
- Year defined: 1937
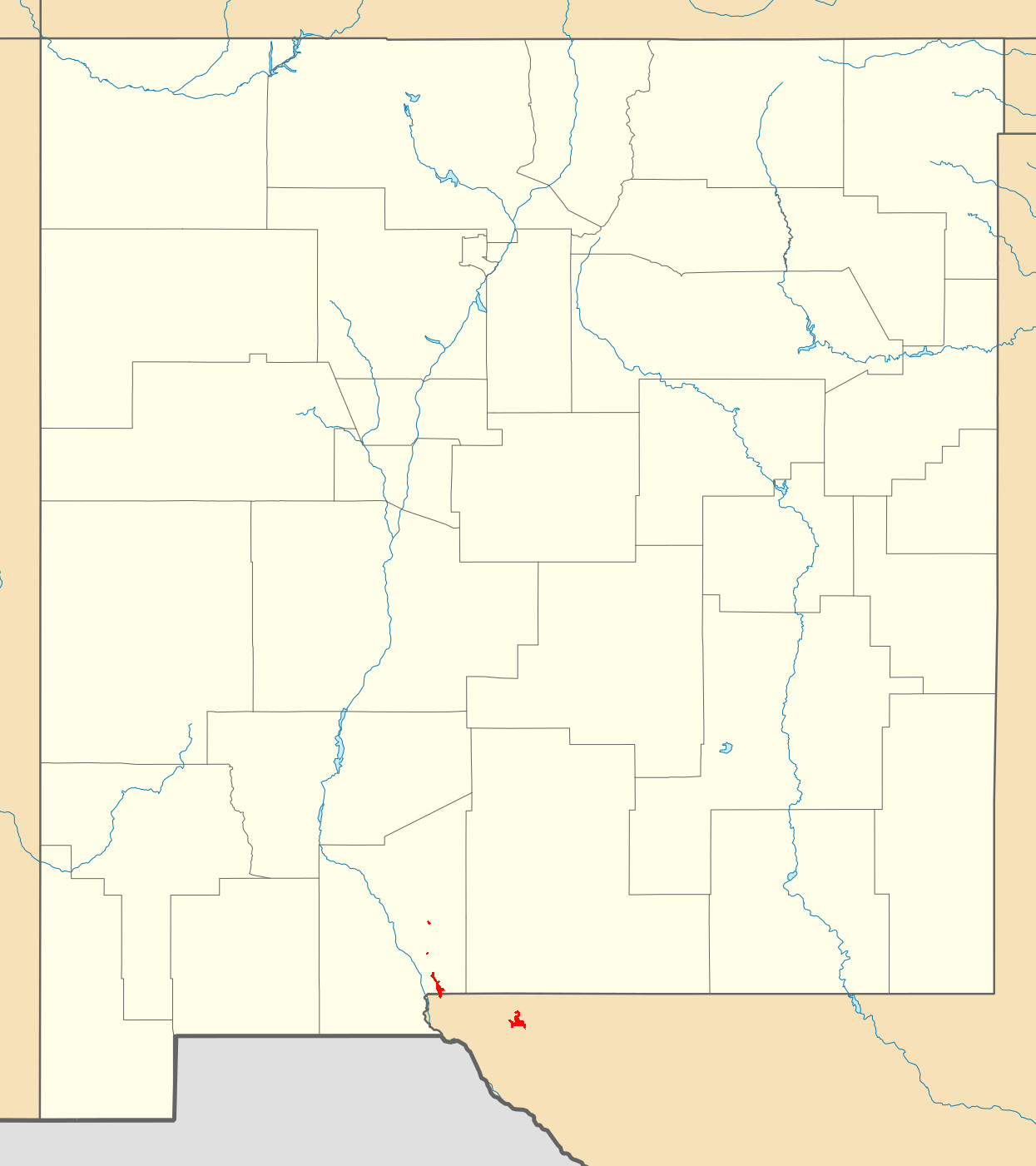
- Bishop Cap Formation (the United States) Bishop Cap Formation (Texas)

The Bishop Cap Formation is a geologic formation in the Franklin Mountains of southern New Mexico and western Texas and the Hueco Mountains of western Texas. It preserves fossils dating back to the Moscovian to Kasimovian Ages of the early Pennsylvanian.

== Description ==
The formation consists of brown to gray shale alternating with thin ray ledges of limestone. Shale makes up 65 to 75 percent of the formation. The total thickness is up to 180 meters (590 ft). The formation rests on the Berino Formation and is overlain by the Panther Seep Formation.

== Fossils ==
The formation is highly fossiliferous, with a fauna dominated by snails, brachiopods (Neospirifer, Crurithyris, Mesolobus), and clams, but is less diverse than the underlying Berino Formation. The lower beds contain the fusulinids Wedekindellina euthysepta and Fusulina distenta. Opercula of cephalopods (possibly Liroceras) have been found in the formation, as have shells of Bellerophon, Phestia, and Euphemites.

== History of investigation ==
The unit was designated the Bishop Cap Member of the Magdalena Group by L.A. Nelson in 1937. In 2001, B. Kues recommended abandoning the Magdalena Group and raising its members, including the Bishop Cap, to formation rank.

== See also ==
- List of fossiliferous stratigraphic units in Texas
- Paleontology in Texas
