= Hell-to-Finish Formation =

Geologic formation in New Mexico

- Stratigraphic range: Neocomian–Aptian
- Type: Formation
- Unit of: Bisbee Group
- Underlies: U-Bar Formation
- Overlies: Various Paleozoic units, Broken Jug Formation
- Thickness: 1,700–3,500 feet (520–1,070 m)

Lithology
- Primary: Shale, mudstone, siltstone

Location
- Coordinates: 31.5433°N 108.3411°W
- Region: New Mexico
- Country: United States

Type section
- Named for: Hell-to-Finish tank
- Named by: R.A. Zeller Jr.
- Year defined: 1965
- Hell-to-Finish Formation (the United States) Hell-to-Finish Formation (New Mexico)

The Hell-to-Finish Formation is a geologic formation in southwestern New Mexico. It preserves fossils dating back to the early Cretaceous period.

== Description ==
The formation consists mostly of red to red-brown to gray or green shale, mudstone, and arkosic siltstone. The base of the formation is a well indurated conglomerate derived from the underlying Paleozoic beds. Minor arkose and limestone are present in the uppermost beds. The total thickness is up to 1,700–3,500 feet (520–1,070 m) but varies considerably over the region. The formation rests on a profound unconformity with underlying Paleozoic formations in most locations, but overlies the Broken Jug Formation in the Little Hatchet Mountains. The Hell-to-Finish Formation is transitional to the overlying U-Bar Formation. The transitional contact with the Aptian U-Bar Formation suggests that the Hell-to-Finish Formation cannot be much older than Aptian.

The formation is interpreted as being deposited in an arid client, based on the nature of paleosols within the formation. Deposition took place in a west-northwest-trending rift basin.

== Fossils ==
The upper beds of the formation contain abundant pelecypods. However, no age-diagnostic fossils have been found in the formation.

== History of investigation ==
The formation was first defined by Zeller in 1965 for exposures near the Hell-to-Finish tank in the southern Big Hatchet Mountains of New Mexico.

== See also ==
- List of fossiliferous stratigraphic units in New Mexico
- Paleontology in New Mexico
