= Rissa estesi =

Rissa estesi Temporal range: Piacenzian

Scientific classification
- Kingdom: Animalia
- Phylum: Chordata
- Class: Aves
- Order: Charadriiformes
- Family: Laridae
- Genus: Rissa
- Species: †R. estesi

Binomial name
- †Rissa estesi Chandler, 1990

Extinct species of bird

Rissa estesi is an extinct species of bird in the genus Rissa that lived during the Piacenzian stage of the Neogene period.

== Distribution ==
Rissa estesi fossils are known from the San Diego Formation of San Diego County, California.
