= Escabrosa Limestone =

Geologic formation in Arizona

- Stratigraphic range: Mississippian
- Type: Formation

Lithology
- Primary: Limestone

Location
- Region: Arizona
- Country: United States

The Escabrosa Limestone is a geologic formation in Arizona left behind from an ancient sea from some 330 million years ago. Layers of the sediment left by the sea hardened into a what is called a "strata." It has preserved fossils dating back to the Mississippian subperiod.

Rainwater has seeped into the limestone, eroding and dissolving the rock into walkable passageways. These are called the "Kartchner Caverns" and are considered a living cavern since they are still growing.

== See also ==
- List of fossiliferous stratigraphic units in Arizona
- Paleontology in Arizona
