= Abuelito Huenteao =

Mythical character in the folklore of the Huilliche of Chile

Abuelito Huenteao or Taita Huenteao is a character in the mythology of the Huilliche of San Juan de la Costa. Several versions exists on the history of Abuelito Huenteao. One of these says he was a healer who travelled the lands of the Huilliche helping people before finally settling on the rocks of Pucatrihue. Other versions says he settled at the sea because he followed his wife who was a mermaid.

Grammatically Abuelito Huenteao is a composite of Spanish and Huilliche language meaning "Grandpa Huenteao", with his other title of "Taita" similarly meaning a respected elder man.
