= Berino Formation =

Geologic formation in New Mexico, US

- Stratigraphic range: middle Pennsylvanian
- Type: Formation
- Underlies: Bishop Cap Formation
- Overlies: La Tuna Formation
- Thickness: 555 ft (169 m)

Lithology
- Primary: Limestone
- Other: Shale

Location
- Coordinates: 31°58′0″N 106°31′30″W
- Region: New Mexico
- Country: United States

Type section
- Named for: Berino, New Mexico
- Named by: L.A. Nelson
- Year defined: 1940
- Berino Formation (the United States) Berino Formation (New Mexico)

The Berino Formation is a geologic formation in the Franklin Mountains of southern New Mexico and western Texas. It preserves fossils dating back to the middle Pennsylvanian.

== Description ==
The unit consists mostly of fossiliferous limestone with some interbedded shale. The shale is more abundant in the base of the formation, and the formation as a whole appears brown banded in outcrop. Beds are typically about 20 feet (6.1 meters) thick, with a prominent massive limestone bed 70 feet (21 meters) thick capping the formation. The total thickness is 555 feet (169 meters). The unit lies on the La Tuna Formation and is overlain by the Bishop Cap Formation.

The formation is interpreted as resulting from deposition of rhythmically alternating lime and clay in a shallow marine environment.

== Fossils ==
The Berino Formation contains abundant fossils, including ichnofossils. These include the fusulinid Fusulinella euryteines and brachiopods, corals, and bryozoa. Fragments of petrified wood are found at the base of the formation and are interpreted as remnants of tree trunks carried out to sea.

== History of investigation ==
The unit was designated the Berino Member of the Magdalena Group by L.A. Nelson in 1937. Kues and Giles recommended discarding the Magdalena Group and raising the unit to formation rank in 2004.

== See also ==
- List of fossiliferous stratigraphic units in New Mexico
- Paleontology in New Mexico
