= Ysleta del Sur Pueblo =

Coordinates: 31°41′09″N 106°19′32″W

- Indian reservation
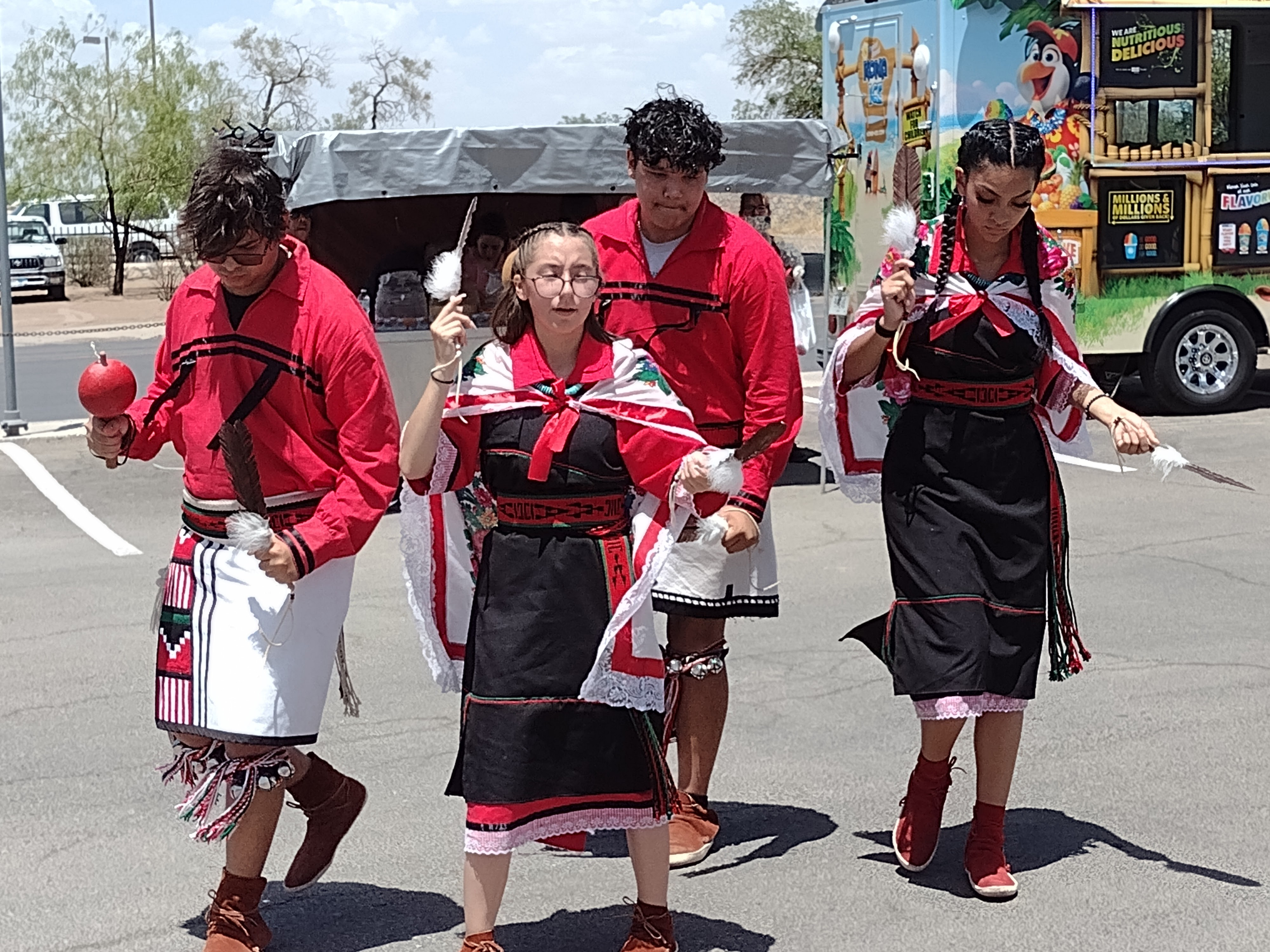
- Young members of Ysleta del Sur Pueblo perform a traditional dance at summer festival, June 2022.
- Location in Texas
- Sovereign Tribe: Ysleta del Sur Pueblo
- Country: United States
- State: Texas
- County: El Paso

Government
  - Body: Tribal council
  - Governor: E. Michael Silvas
  - Lt. Governor: Adam Torres
  - Cacique: Johnny Hisa

Population (2022)
  - Total: 4,000+
- Website: ysletadelsurpueblo.org

Ysleta del Sur Pueblo or Tigua Pueblo is a Native American Pueblo and federally recognized tribe in the Ysleta section of El Paso, Texas. Its citizens are Southern Tiwa people who had been displaced from Spanish New Mexico from 1680 to 1681 during the Pueblo Revolt against the Spaniards.

The people and language are called Tigua (pronounced tiwa). They have maintained a tribal identity and lands in Texas. Spanish mostly replaced the indigenous language of Southern Tiwa in the early 1900s, and today, English is increasingly gaining ground in the community. Today there are efforts to revive the indigenous language.

They are one of three federally recognized tribes in Texas.

== Tribal government ==
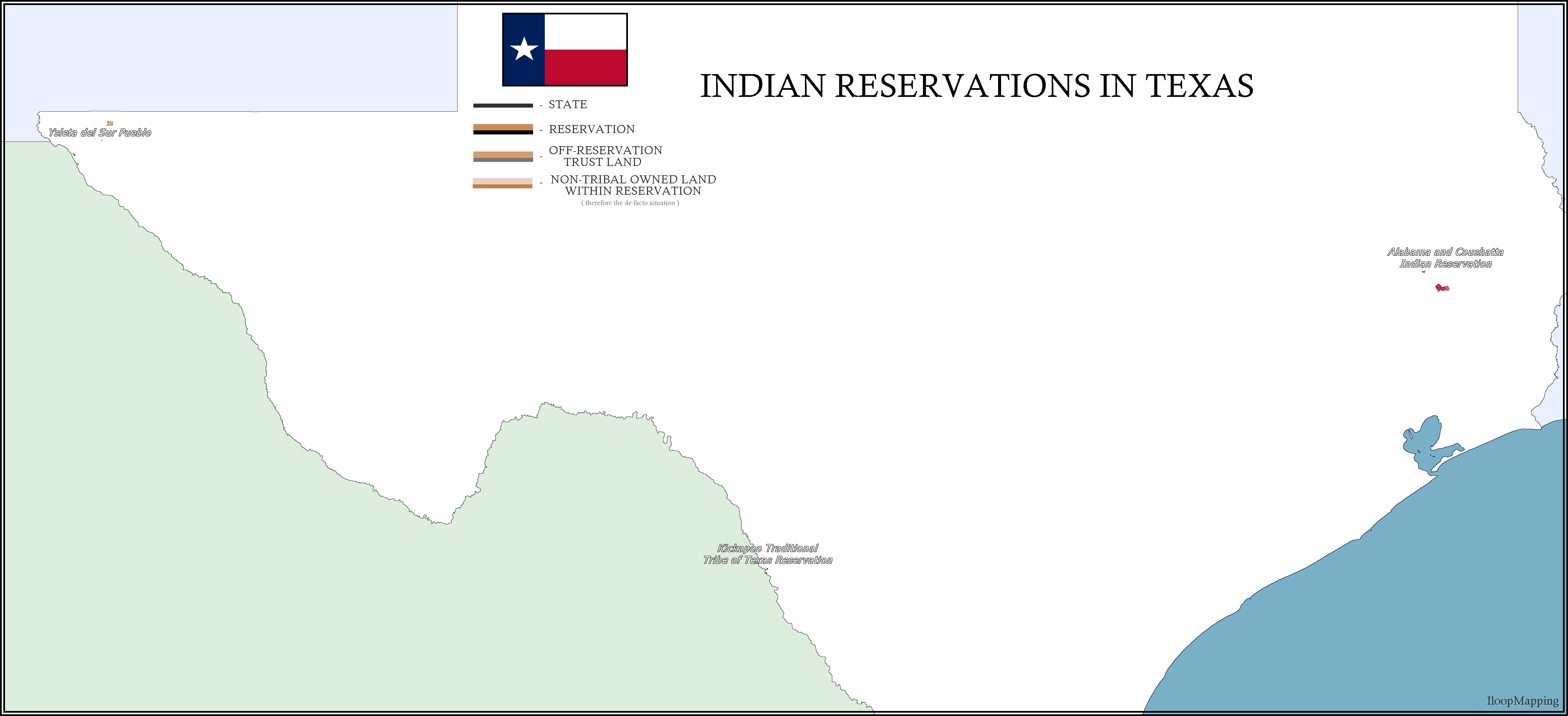
Map of the Ysleta del Sur Pueblo and neighboring reservations (In orange).

As of 2022, E. Michael Silvas is the governor of Ysleta del Sur Pueblo. The 2021 Tribal Council consists of Sheriff Bernardo Gonzales, Councilman Rudy Cruz Jr., Councilman Rafael Gomez Jr., Governor E. Michael Silvas, Cacique Jose Sierra Sr., Lt. Governor Adam Torres, War Captain Javier Loera, Councilman Raul Candelaria, and Councilman Andrew Torrez.

In 2020, the tribal government employed 293 individuals, of whom 58 percent were tribal citizens.

== Population ==
In April 2008, the Tribal Census Department reported 1,615 enrolled citizens. By 2020, there were 4,696 enrolled citizens of Ysleta del Sur Pueblo.

== Economic development ==
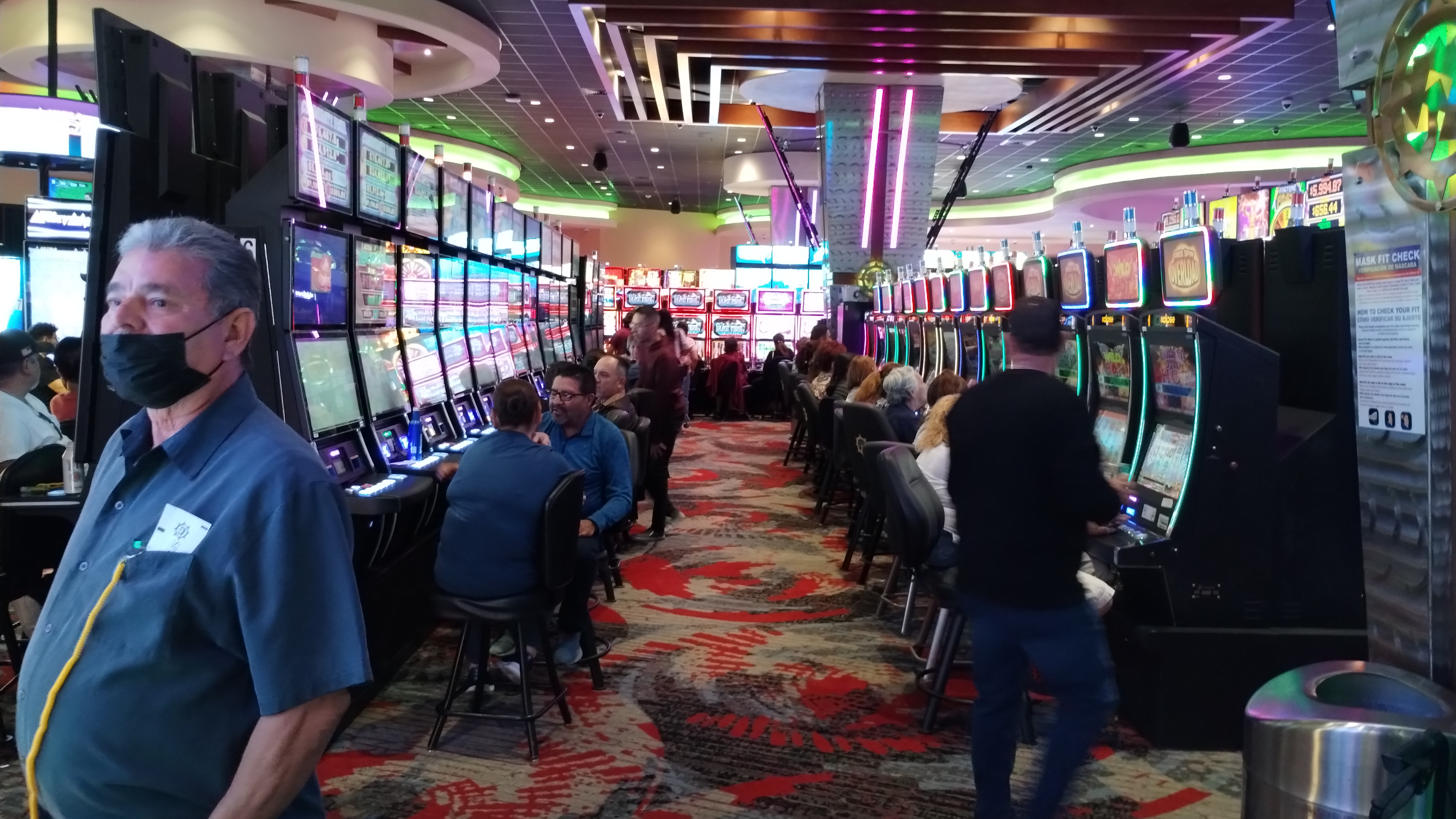
Speaking Rock Casino interior

For almost 40 years, the Pueblo has owned and operated tribal businesses that provide employment for its members and the El Paso community. These businesses include the Big Bear Oil Co., Inc., and the Tigua Indian Cultural Center, and Speaking Rock Entertainment Center.

The Speaking Rock Entertainment Center in El Paso features live concerts, a restaurant, a café, and bars. Originally called the Speaking Rock Casino, the center has had Class II casino gaming since 2022.

== History ==
=== 17th century ===
The Ysleta del Sur Pueblo is a U.S. federally recognized Native American tribe and sovereign nation. Tiwa people aligned with the Spanish Empire in Santa Fe de Nuevo México fled during the Pueblo Revolt and established the Pueblo of Ysleta del Sur in 1682. After leaving the homelands of Quarai Pueblo due to drought, the Tiwa sought refuge at Isleta Pueblo and were later captured by the Spanish during the 1680 Pueblo Revolt and forced to walk south for over 400 miles. Ysleta del Sur did not participate in the Pueblo Revolt.

The Tigua settled and built the Ysleta del Sur Pueblo and soon after built the acequia (canal) system that sustained a thriving agrarian community. The tribe's early economic and farming efforts helped pave the way for the development of the region.

=== 19th century ===
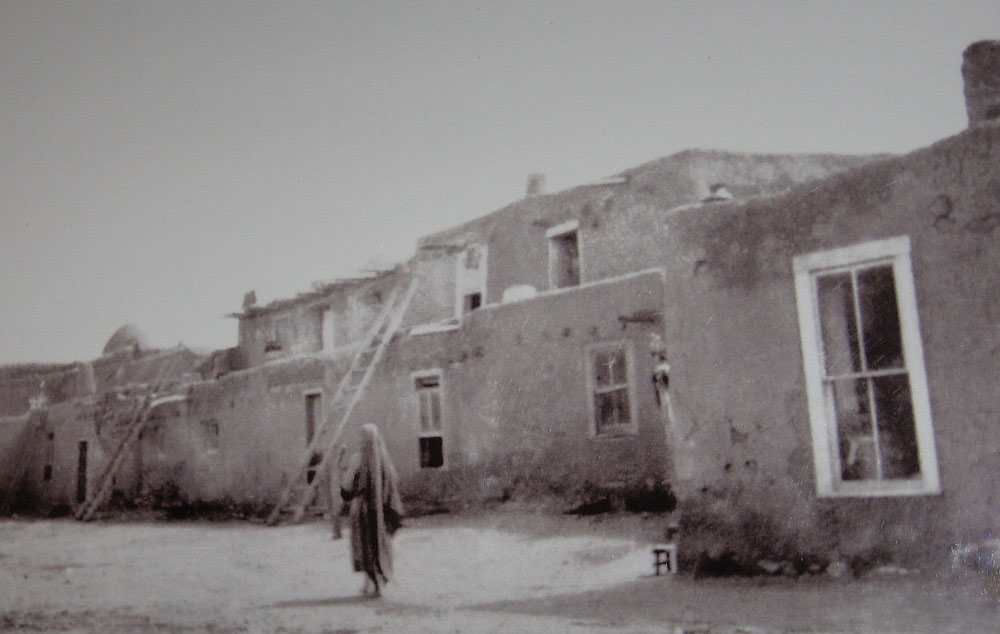
Old Ysleta del Sur Pueblo, c. 1876

Throughout the 19th century and into the first half of the 20th century, the Tiguas maintained the syncretic Spanish-Indigenous political and religious offices introduced by the Spanish in the 16th century. Like other Pueblos, the Tiguas had offices that included Cacique (chief), who served for life as well as in spiritual matters, Lieutenant-cacique, Governor, Lieutenant-governor, War Captain, and subordinate captains. Local newspapers regularly reported on tribal elections and the Tiguas' primary religious celebration on St. Anthony's Day honoring St. Anthony the patron saint of their mission church and community. Lacking a well-bounded and defined federal Indian reservation, the Tiguas intermarried extensively with Mexican Americans and assimilated many cultural and material traits of their Hispanic neighbors. Over time, many lost the Tiwa language and many Isleta Pueblo customs and traditions.

=== 20th century ===
Important for their later federal tribal recognition, in 1901 noted anthropologist Jesse Walter Fewkes (later famous for his excavations of Mesa Verde) visited Ysleta del Sur as part of a trip to study the New Mexico Pueblos. While noting their assimilation or "Mexicanization," Fewkes published a short ethnographic article detailing the Tiguas' surviving Pueblo customs and traditions. He found that twenty-five could still speak the Tiwa language while many more could understand it. He noted that the Tiguas still performed several indigenous dances, including the scalp dance and a rattle dance. Ceremonies were accompanied by chants in the Tiwa language. Tiguas still called their community by a Tigua name, "Chiawipia." The group continued to hold elections for tribal officers. At the time, Fewkes wrote that José Piarote served as Cacique, Mariano Manero served as Governor, and Tomal Granillo was War Captain. Significantly, Manero still carried a baton or staff of office that Fewkes concluded was just like those carried by leaders at the New Mexico Pueblos.

During the 1930s the Tiguas did not seek aid from the federal government during President Franklin Roosevelt's important Indian New Deal like many unrecognized Indian tribes. They were still recognized, however, as indigenous people by local and state officials. The tribe was invited to take part in the 1936 Texas Centennial Celebration in Dallas. Donning Plains Indian regalia, Tigua officials rode in the opening ceremony parade. Tigua leaders made Franklin Roosevelt "Honorary Cacique" and Eleanor Roosevelt "Honorary Squaw" at the time.

By the 1950s the Tigua community was in dire circumstances. Having lost their valuable tribal lands, most members lived in poverty near the old mission church while others moved to other parts of El Paso for better economic opportunities. That decade the community was threatened when the City of El Paso annexed Ysleta, imposing new taxes. Tigua leaders reached out for aid. In 1961, the Mayor of El Paso wrote to the Bureau of Indian Affairs asking for assistance for the group. As this was during the Termination Era when the U.S. government was "getting out of the Indian business" and terminating tribal governments and reservations, the government denied any responsibility for the Tiguas. As part of the Tiguas' outreach for assistance, the University of Arizona Anthropology Department sent a graduate student to study the group in 1966. He took a census, finding that 166 individuals served as the core of the Tigua community while others were more peripherally involved. The War Captain, Trinidad Granillo, still maintained the tribe's ceremonial center (kiva) in his home. He also kept the tribes' sacred drum or tombe which was revered for its spiritual power. The scholar also reported that the Tiguas still maintained their St. Anthony's Day ceremonials, tribal dances, and indigenous chants.

The 1960s were important years for the Tigua community. With the aid of a Latino friend, the Tiguas reached out to a young attorney, Tom Diamond, to aid them in their economic struggles. Diamond, a vocal supporter of the liberal agenda of Democratic Presidents John F. Kennedy and his successor Lyndon Johnson, agreed to aid the group. Diamond helped the Tiguas reconnect with their relatives at Isleta Pueblo in New Mexico. Its governor, Andy Abeita, visited the Tiguas and was surprised at the level of Isleta traditions the band still maintained. He became a staunch advocate for the band. Under Diamond, the Tiguas pursued a significant lands claims case through the post-war Indian Claims Commission, an effort that generated considerable documentation on the tribal survival of the Tiguas, as well as the consequences that stemmed from the federal government's failure to fulfill its trust responsibilities to the band.

In 1966, Diamond helped introduce the Tiguas to Vine Deloria, Jr., a noted Lakota scholar who was then serving as Executive Director of the National Congress of American Indians (NCAI). The NCAI lobbied to have the Tiguas recognized as a federally recognized Indian tribe. Deloria also featured the Tiguas prominently in his seminal book, Custer Died for Your Sins: An Indian Manifesto, highlighting the band as an important symbol of the survival of indigenous values in modern American society. As part of the effort to secure status and aid for the band, Diamond gained the support of the Texas delegation to Congress and the Senate for Tigua tribal recognition. Due to termination sentiment in Congress, federal officials were not willing to grant full federal tribal acknowledgment at the time. The Ysleta band as a result only was recognized as the Tigua Indians of El Paso in 1967 as a Texas Indian tribe; House Bill 888 was passed during the 60th Legislature, Regular Session, transferring all trust responsibilities for the Tigua Indians to the Texas Indian Commission. On April 12, 1968, under Public Law 90–287 82 Stat. 93 the United States Congress relinquished all responsibility for the Tiwa Indians of Ysleta, Texas to the State of Texas. The Tiwa Indians Act, borrowing word-for-word from the Lumbee Indian Act of the mid-1950s, specified that tribal members would be ineligible for any services, claims or demands from the United States as Indians.

Under Texas jurisdiction, the state created a reservation for the Tiguas. Tiguas and state officials created economic development programs. The most important was a tourism venture on the reservation. Here Tiguas were hired to demonstrate indigenous crafts and lifeways. During the 1970s there was great public interest in Indigenous Americans, and for a time, this program was successful. It became apparent to Tiguas and their non-indigenous supporters, however, that limited state aid and economic development programs were not sufficient for tribal survival. Without federal tribal status, the Tiguas did not have access to federal programs of the Bureau of Indian Affairs; they could not exercise true self-government without federal tribal recognition.

Public Law 100-89, 101 STAT. 666 was enacted August 16, 1987, and restored the federal relationship with the tribe simultaneously with those of the Alabama-Coushatta Tribe. The restoration act renamed the tribe to the Ysleta Del Sur Pueblo, repealed the Tiwa Indians Act, and specifically prohibited all gaming activities prohibited by the laws of the state of Texas. The Tigua have maintained a federal relationship continuously since 1987.

The legislation of the United States Congress restored eligibility to receive services from the federal government to this group, the southernmost tribe of the Pueblo peoples.

== Notable people ==
- Claire Valdez (born 1989)

== See also ==
- Awelo
- Isleta Pueblo
- Piro Pueblo

== Bibliography ==
- Bartlett, John R. (1909). The language of the Piro. American Anthropologist, 11 (3), 426–433.
- Diamond, Tom. (1966). The Tigua Indians of El Paso. Denver: National Congress of American Indian Funds.
- Fewkes, J. Walter. (1902). The Pueblo settlements near El Paso, Texas. American Anthropologist, 4 (1), 57–75.
- Harrington, John P. (1909). Notes on the Piro language. American Anthropologist, 11 (4), 563–594.
- Houser, Nicholas P. (1970). The Tigua settlement of Ysleta del Sur. The Kiva, 36 (2), 23–39.
- Houser, Nicholas P. (1979). Tigua Pueblo. In A. Ortiz (Ed.), Handbook of North American Indians: Southwest (Vol. 9, pp. 336–342). Washington, DC: Smithsonian Institution.
- Miller, Mark Edwin. (2004). Forgotten Tribes: Unrecognized Indians and the Federal Acknowledgment Process. Lincoln: University of Nebraska Press.
