= Shellenberger Canyon Formation =

- Type: Geological formation

The Shellenberger Canyon Formation is a Mesozoic geologic formation. Dinosaur remains diagnostic to the genus level are among the fossils that have been recovered from the formation.

== Paleofauna ==
- cf Tenontosaurus sp

== See also ==
- List of dinosaur-bearing rock formations
  - List of stratigraphic units with few dinosaur genera
