= Naco Formation =

Geologic formation in Arizona

- Stratigraphic range: Pennsylvanian
- Type: Formation

Lithology
- Primary: Limestone
- Other: Shale, siltstone

Location
- Region: Arizona
- Country: United States

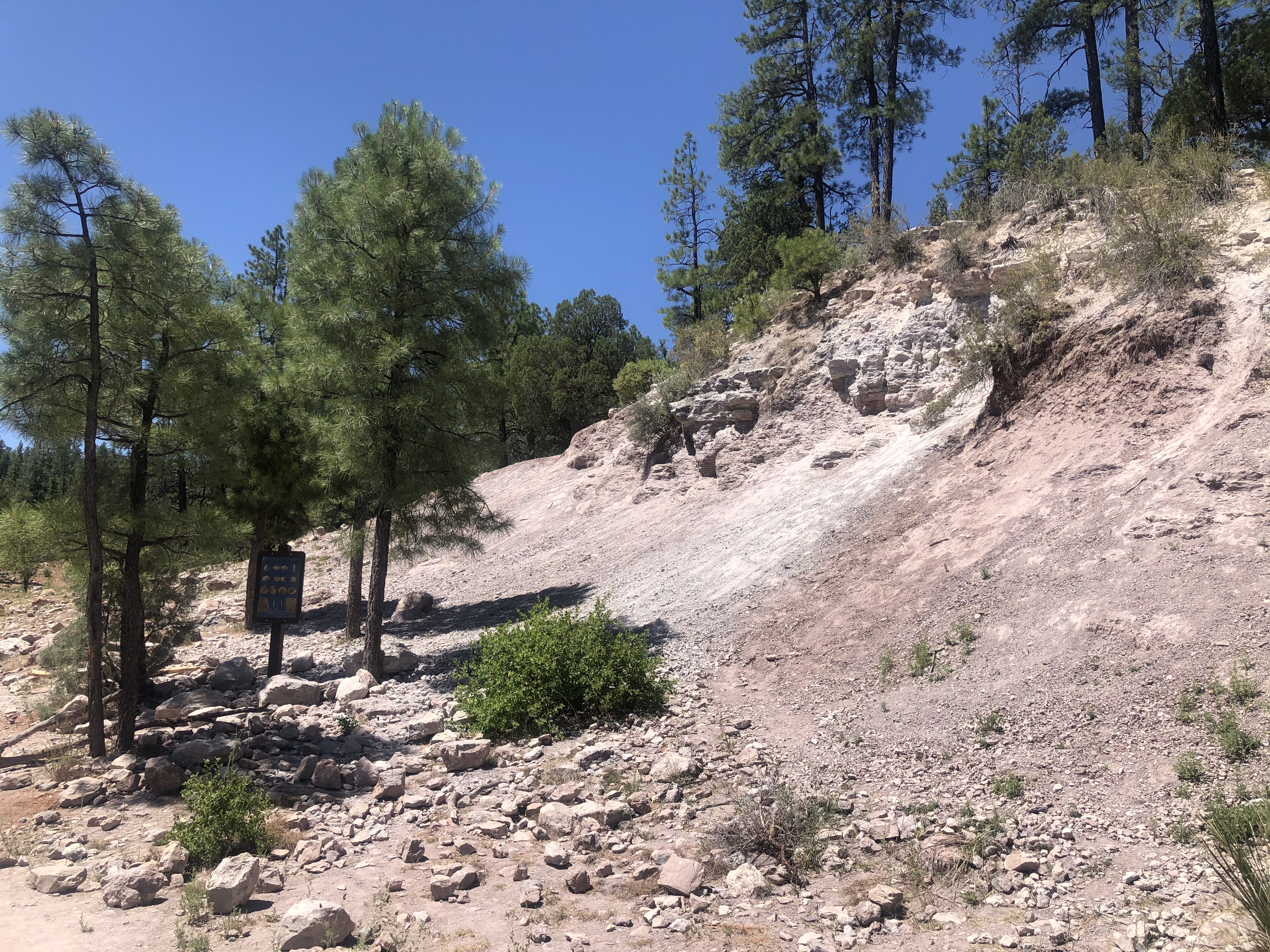
Indian Gardens Paleo Site with the Naco Formation exposed and available to the public

The Naco Formation is a geologic formation in Arizona. It preserves fossils dating back to the Pennsylvanian subperiod.

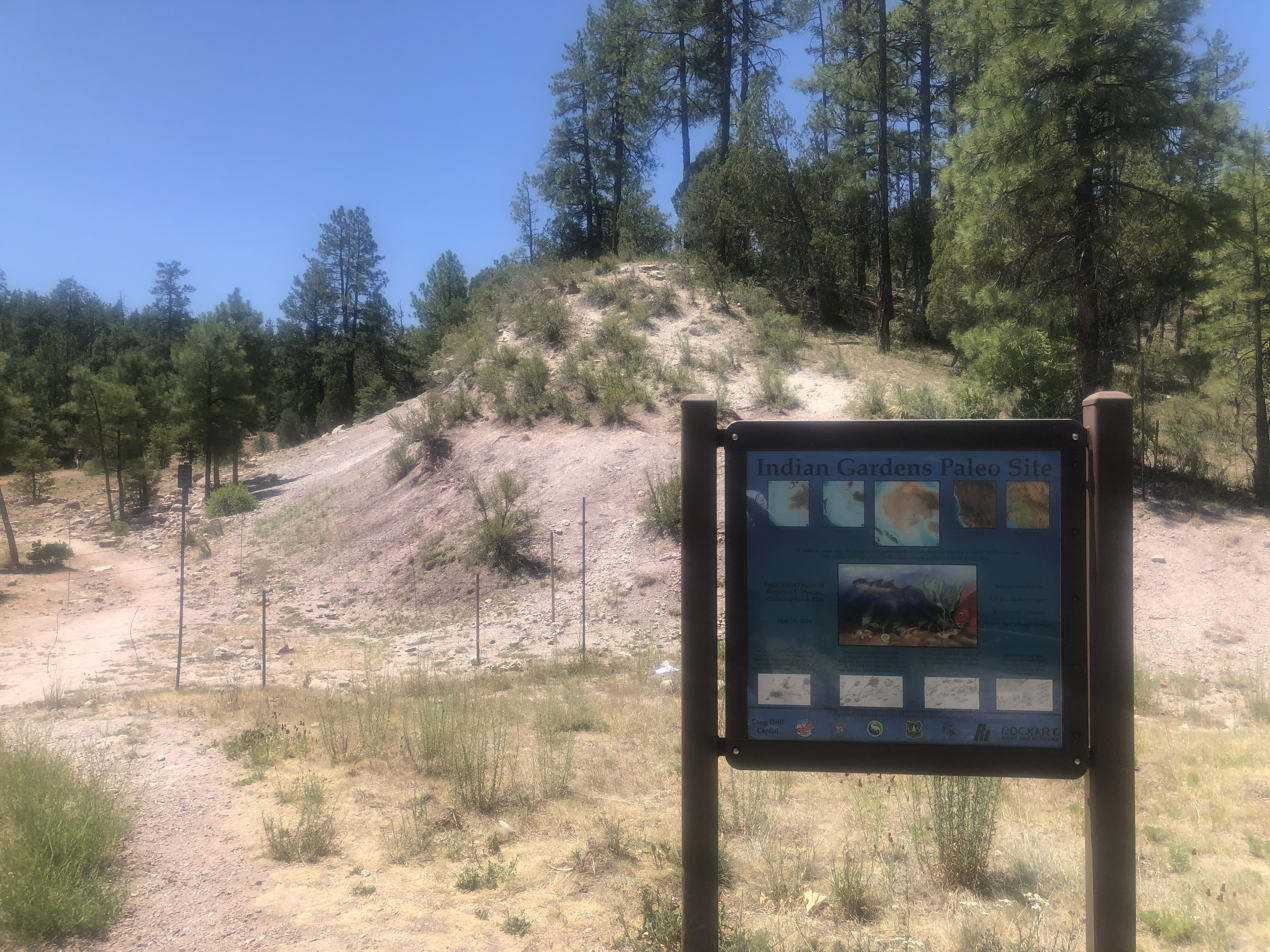
Indian Gardens Paleo Site approximately 12 miles east of Payson Arizona on highway 260

Fossils from the Kohls Ranch locality of Gila County, Arizona, include bivalve and gastropod molluscs, brachiopods, bryozoans, crinoids, cnidarians and chondrichthyan teeth.

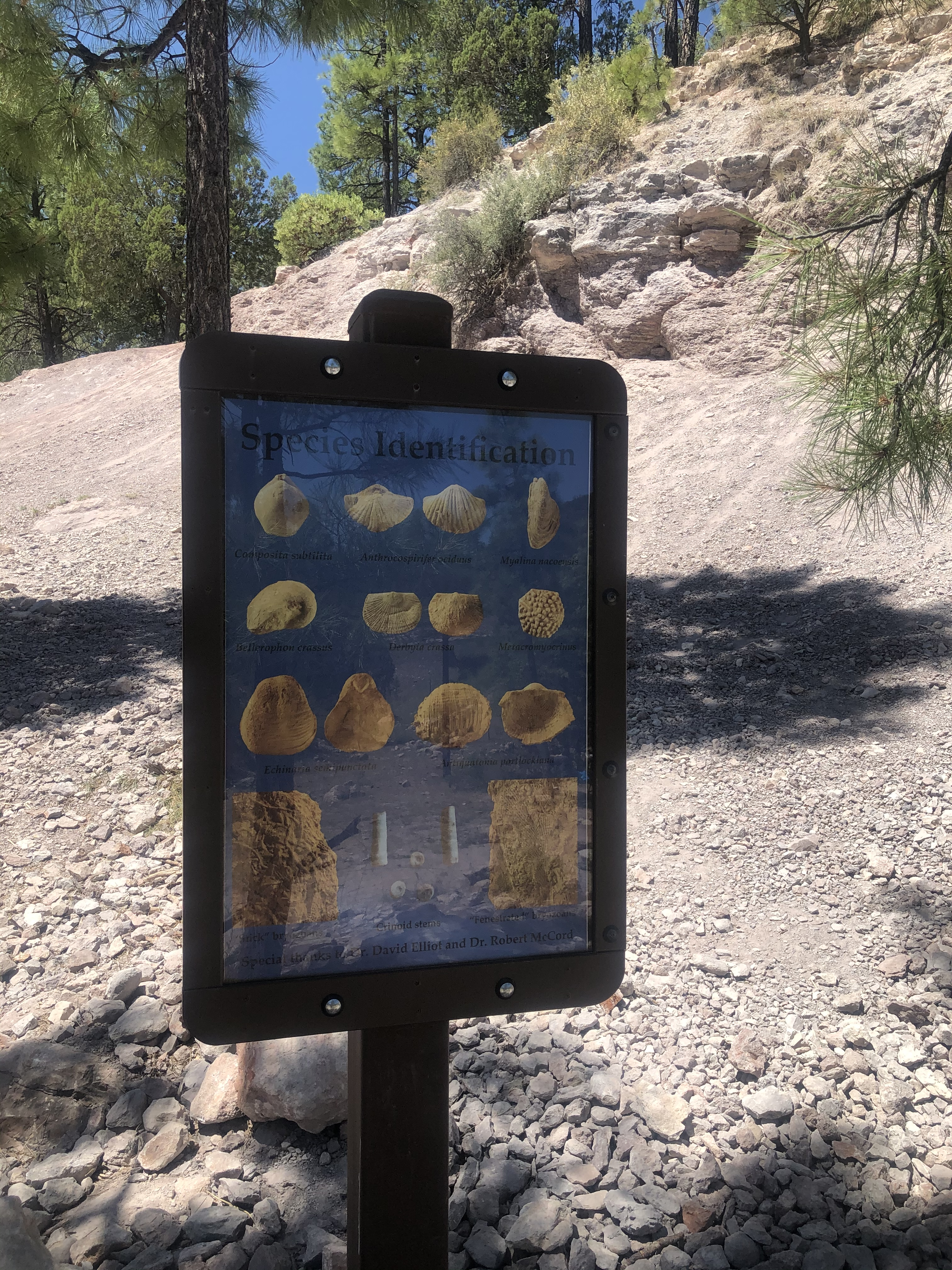
Indian Gardens Paleo Site with species identification sign

== See also ==
- List of fossiliferous stratigraphic units in Arizona
- Paleontology in Arizona
