= Mountain Springs Formation =

Geologic formation in Arizona, United States

The Mountain Springs Formation is Devonian stratigraphic unit in Arizona. The remains of both antiarch and arthrodire placoderms are known from the formation.
