= Pucatrihue =

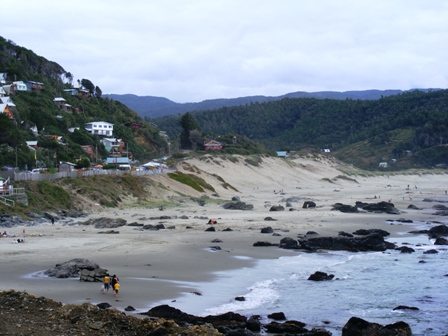
- Interactive map of Pucatrihue
- Coordinates: 40°32′38″S 73°43′4″W
- Region: Los Lagos
- Province: Osorno
- Municipality: San Juan de la Costa
- Commune: San Juan de la Costa

Government
  - Type: Municipal
  - Alcade: Bernardo Candia Henríquez (DC)
- Elevation: 10 m (33 ft)

Population (2002)
  - Total: 130 (including Contaco)
- Time zone: UTC−04:00 (Chilean Standard)
  - Summer (DST): UTC−03:00 (Chilean Daylight)
- Area code: Country + town = 56 + 64
- Climate: Cfb

Pucatrihue is a settlement, beach and balneario located at coast of Osorno Province, southern Chile. Its economy revolves around tourism subsistence farming and logging.
