= Hueco Mountains =

Mountain range in the United States

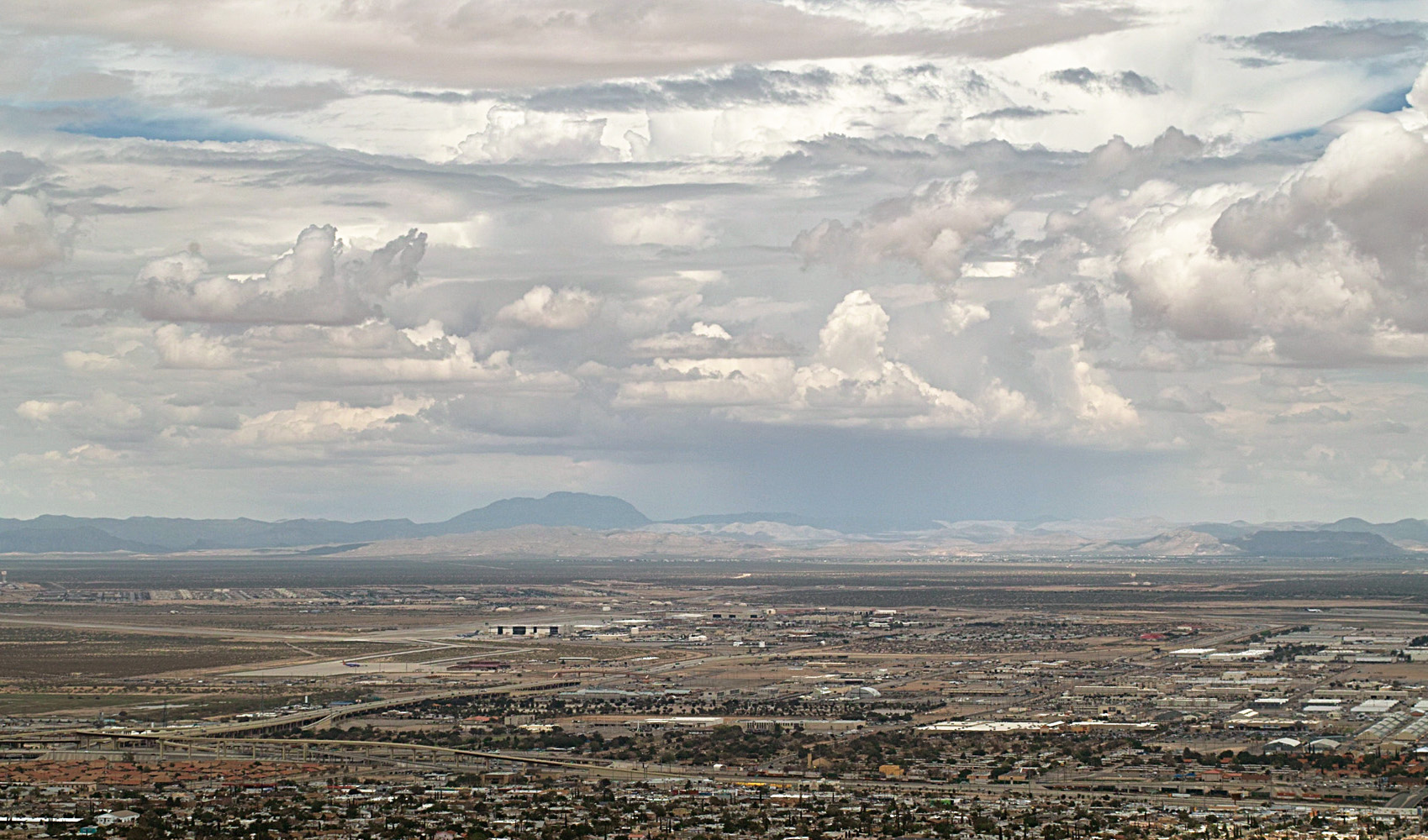
- Hueco Mountains in sun and rain, with Cerro Alto prominent, as seen from the base of the tramway, El Paso, Texas, 30 miles (50 km) west of Cerro Alto

Highest point
- Peak: Cerro Alto Mountain
- Elevation: 6,703 ft (2,043 m)
- Coordinates: 31°56′43″N 105°58′12″W

Dimensions
- Length: 71 mi (114 km) N/S
- Width: 62 mi (100 km) E/W
- Area: 2,562 mi^{2} (6,640 km^{2})

Geography
- Country: United States
- State(s): Texas, New Mexico

The Hueco Mountains are a range of mountains that rise in southern Otero County, New Mexico and extend 27 miles (43 km) south into Texas, generally along the El Paso–Hudspeth county line just east of the city of El Paso, Texas. The highest point of the range is the Cerro Alto Mountain 6,703 feet (2,043 m) in Hudspeth County.

The Hueco Bolson, a down-dropped area with an elevation of 4,000 feet (1,200 m) above sea level, with sedimentary fill nearly 9,000 feet (2,700 m) thick, lies between the Hueco and Franklin Mountains. Shallow, stony soils in the Hueco Mountains support oak, juniper, and some mesquite. The mountains were part of the Rocky Mountain trend, forced upward as part of the Laramide mountain-building period during the late Cretaceous, 60 to 70 million years ago.

The word hueco is Spanish for hollow, gap, or hole.
