= Vasquez Formation =

Geologic formation in the Sierra Pelona of California

- Stratigraphic range: Late Oligocene-Early Miocene (Arikareean); ~25–20.4 Ma
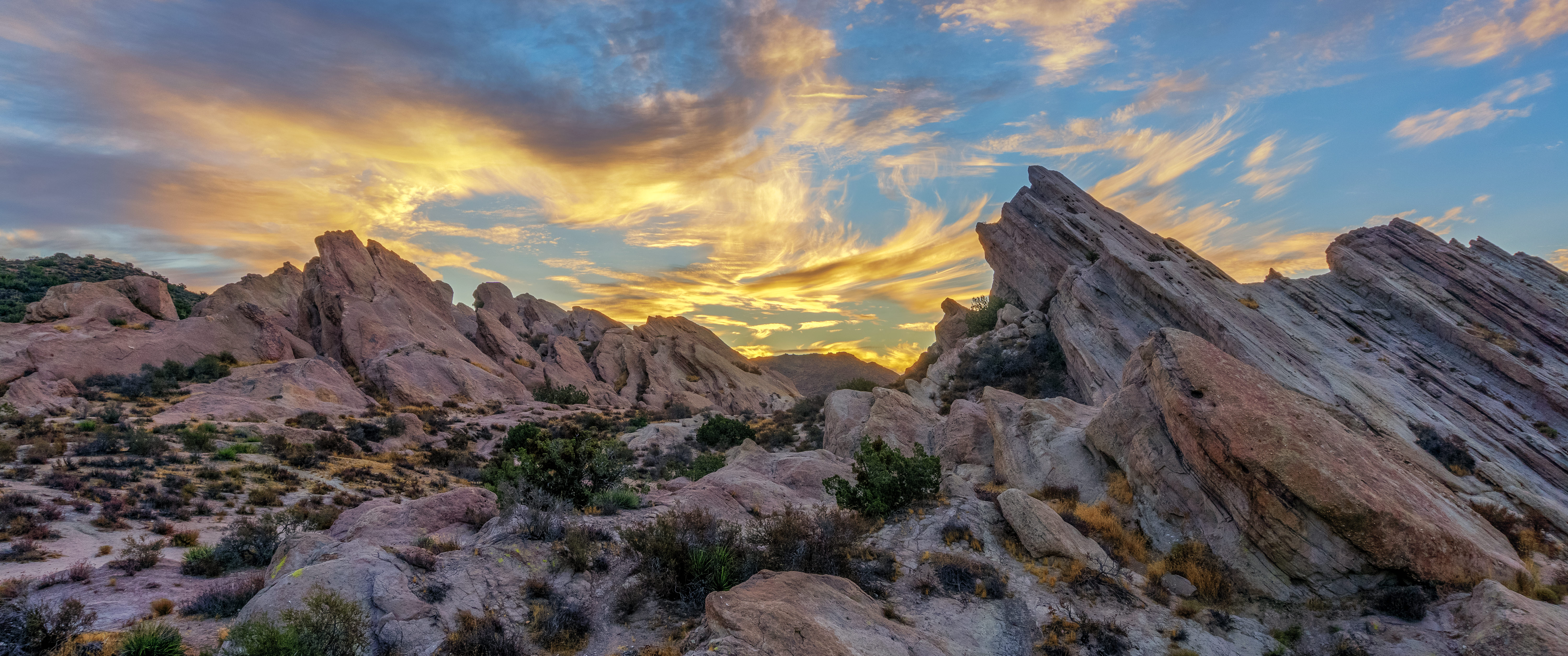
- The Vasquez Formation at Vasquez Rocks Natural Area
- Type: Formation
- Sub-units: Subdivision
- Underlies: Paradise Springs Formation & Tick Canyon strata
- Overlies: San Francisquito Formation, Triassic Mount Lowe Intrusive Suite & Jurassic syenite (basement)
- Thickness: 3,810 m (12,500 ft)

Lithology
- Primary: Conglomerate, sandstone
- Other: Basalt, andesite, rhyodacite, rhyolite, trachyandesite, limestone

Location
- Coordinates: 34°28′48″N 118°19′00″W
- Region: Los Angeles County, California
- Country: United States
- Extent: Vasquez Rocks Natural Area, Sierra Pelona Ridge, San Gabriel Mountains; Punchbowl Block & Soledad Basin

Type section
- Named for: Tiburcio Vasquez
- Named by: Sharp
- Year defined: 1935
- Vasquez Formation (the United States) Vasquez Formation (California)

The Vasquez Formation (Tvz) is a geologic formation cropping out at the eponymous Vasquez Rocks in southern California. The formation dates to the Late Oligocene to Early Miocene (Arikareean in the NALMA classification).

== Description ==
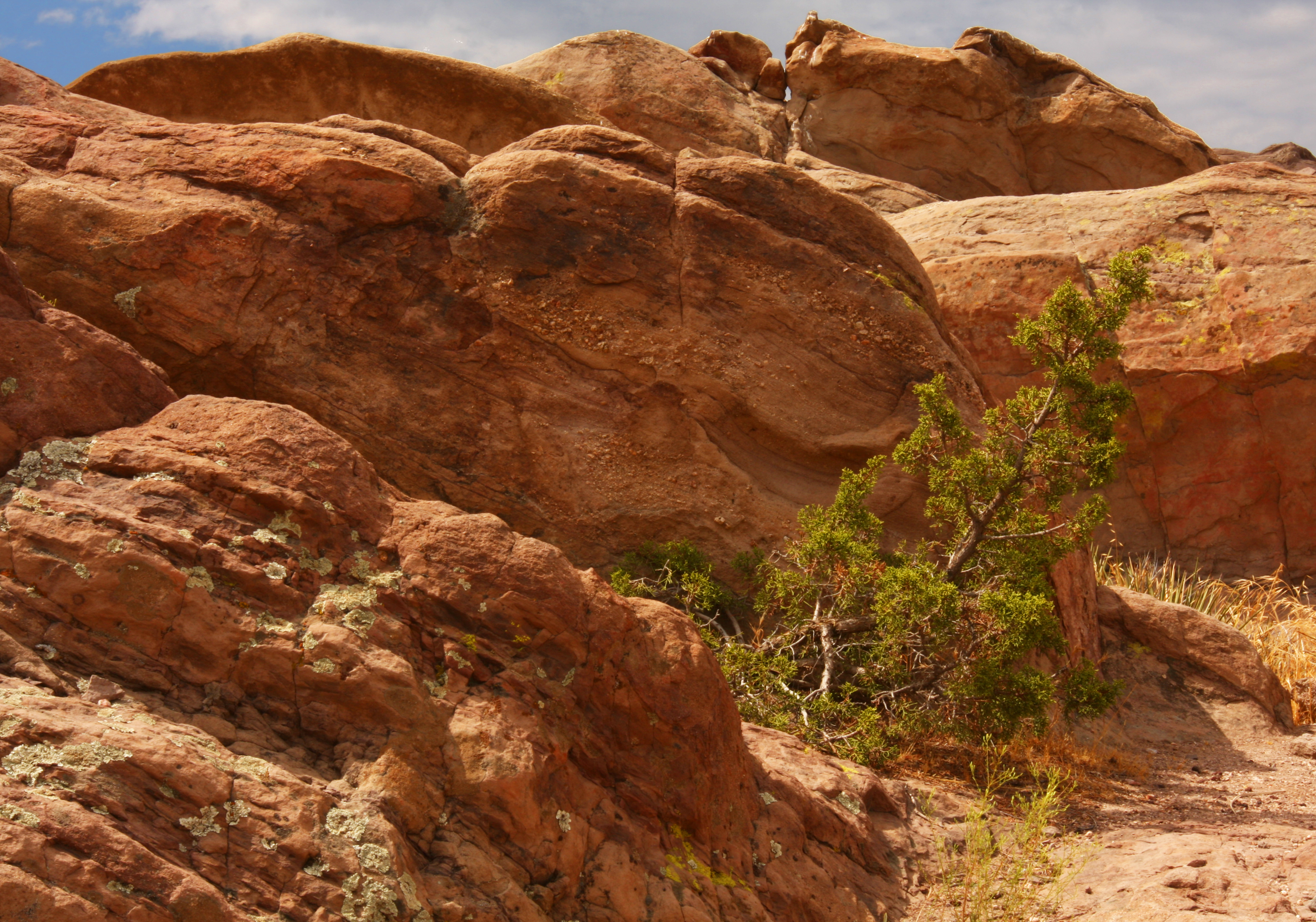
Conglomeratic facies of the Vasquez Formation

The Vasquez Formation was described as "Vasquez Series" by Sharp in 1935, and further described by Jahns (1939). The formation crops out in the eponymous Vasquez Rocks, part of the Los Angeles Basin. The formation was deposited in a series of minibasins between the San Gabriel and San Andreas Faults. The Vasquez Formation unconformably overlies Triassic basement of the Mount Lowe intrusive series, and localized the Jurassic syenite occurring in the area. The formation, comprising some rhyodacite and rhyolite, is overlain by the Paradise Springs Formation in the Punchbowl Block and the Tick Canyon strata in the Soledad Basin, separated by an angular unconformity. The formation is considered equivalent to the Plush Ranch and Diligencia Formations.

In the Soledad Basin and the San Andreas Fault Zone, the formation is described by the United States Geological Survey (USGS) as: Early Miocene to Oligocene? yellowish and reddish sandstone, conglomerate, and interbedded andesite-basalt, lying on pre-Tertiary crystalline basement rocks and unconformably below strata of Tick Canyon Formation; total thickness as much as 3,810 metres (12,500 ft). The formation includes numerous beds and lenses of megabreccia, many monolithologic.

The formation represents the stratigraphically lowermost non-marine strata. The Vasquez Formation is composed primarily of bright-red conglomerate and sandstone. The conglomerate exhibits low degrees of rounding and sorting, a muddy matrix, and, commonly, reverse grading. South of Blue Ridge, the Vasquez Formation nonconformably overlies granitoid, although the base of the section is excised by the Blue Ridge Fault along much of its length. Interbedded trachyandesite is present near the base of the section, in places capped by thinly bedded tan limestone. Clasts of the Jurassic granitoid were encountered in the Vasquez Formation.

North of Blue Ridge, the Vasquez Formation also lies depositionally atop granitoid, possibly with some intervening San Francisquito Formation in places. The Vasquez Formation north of Blue Ridge contains lenses of very poorly sorted, very angular, matrix-poor megabreccias, interbedded with Vasquez Formation conglomerate and sandstone. These deposits fit the definitions of "crackle breccia facies" and "jigsaw breccia facies". The sorting, rounding, grading, and matrix within Vasquez conglomerate suggest deposition by debris-flow and hyperconcentrated-flow mechanisms. Where Vasquez Formation conglomerate is dominated by granitoid and volcanic clasts, the sandstone composition is dominated by feldspar, especially plagioclase. While where the Vasquez Formation conglomerate is dominated by sandstone clasts from the San Francisquito Formation, the Vasquez Formation sandstone contains significantly more quartz and sedimentary lithics.

The Vasquez Formation has been interpreted to represent primarily proximal alluvial-fan deposits. The lenses of granitoid crackle and jigsaw breccia in the Vasquez Formation north of Blue Ridge were concluded to be rock-avalanche deposits. The thin interval of thinly bedded limestone atop the interbedded trachyandesite was interpreted as lacustrine, likely the result of ponding against the volcanic flows. The high relative abundance of trachyandesite and rhyolite clasts immediately up section of the trachyandesite flows suggests that the rhyolite clasts are from deposits closely related to, and thus broadly coeval with, the trachyandesite flows. If so, then the 24.4 ± 0.9 Ma age determined by Coffey et al. in 2019 for the rhyolite clasts should approximate the age of the trachyandesite flows, and thus the age of the interbedded strata. Therefore, deposition of the Vasquez Formation in the Punchbowl Block probably began approximately 25–24 Ma or earlier. Zircons found in the overlying Tick Canyon strata and interpreted as coming from the Vasquez volcanics were dated at 25.3 ± 0.1 Ma.

=== Deposition ===
In the Early Miocene, around 21 Ma, the paleogeography of the area has been interpreted as an existing high to the southeast of the Soledad Basin, where the alluvial fans prograded towards the northwest.

The formation was deposited before the San Gabriel Fault became active, during the deposition of the Mint Canyon and Castaic Formations.

Although the formation to date has not provided fossil remains, the Vasquez Formation has a strong but unproven potential for paleontological interest.

=== Subdivision ===
The formation on United States Geological Survey (USGS) maps is subdivided into four units based on its lithological composition;

- Tvza - andesitic volcanic rocks (early Miocene? to late Oligocene) — Dark-gray to dark reddish-brown andesite and basaltic andesite, hard, very fine-grained matrix with fine- to medium euhedral phenocrysts of plagioclase feldspar. Occasional flow banding, conglomeratic layering, and some silica-filled amygdules are visible. Outcrops locally exhibit sub-parallel sheet jointing.
- Tvzb - basaltic volcanic rocks (early Miocene? to late Oligocene) — Dark-gray, basaltic to andesitic volcanic rocks. Unit contains small phenocrysts of augite and olivine. Outcrop exposures are highly jointed and resistant, with weathered surfaces dark-gray to dark- brown.
- Tvzc - non-marine conglomerate (early Miocene? to late Oligocene) — Pebble- to cobble fluvial conglomerate and red clayey siltstone. The unit consists of sub-rounded to rounded clasts of gray, tan, pink, and lavender volcanic rocks. Also contains quartz monzonitic to granodioritic clasts.
- Tvzs - sedimentary rocks (early Miocene? to late Oligocene) — Pebble- to cobble fluvial conglomerate and red clayey siltstone. This unit consists of sub-rounded to rounded clasts of gray, tan, pink, and lavender volcanic rocks. It also contains quartz monzonitic to granodioritic clasts.

== See also ==
- List of fossiliferous stratigraphic units in California
- Paleontology in California
- Plush Ranch Formation
- Mint Canyon Formation
