= Mint Canyon Formation =

Miocene geologic formation in the Sierra Pelona of California

- Stratigraphic range: Mid-Late Miocene (Barstovian-Clarendonian); ~16–11 Ma
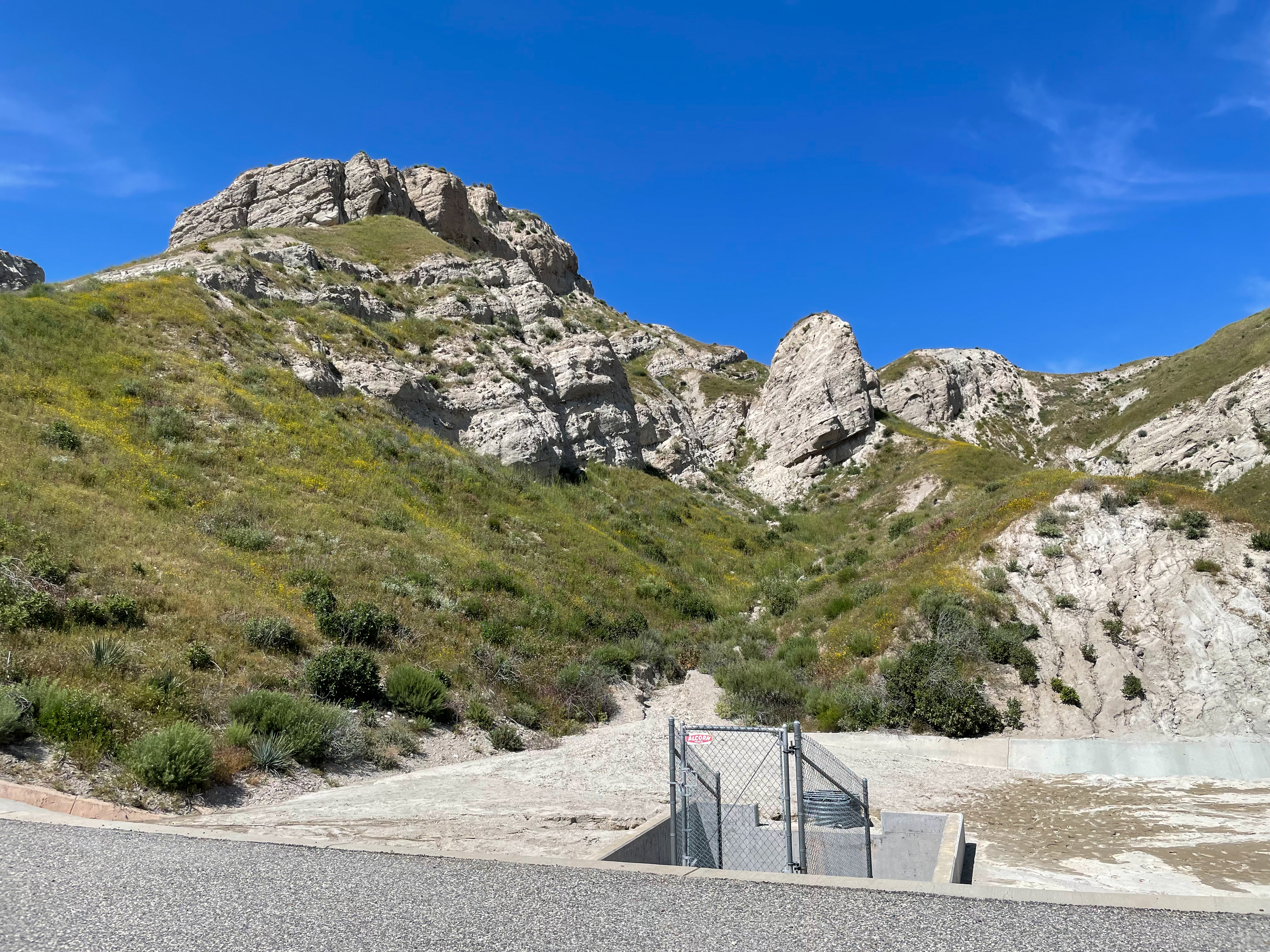
- Sedimentary outcroppings in the Canyon Country borough of Santa Clarita
- Type: Geologic formation
- Underlies: Castaic & Saugus Formations
- Overlies: Tick Canyon Formation

Lithology
- Primary: Conglomerate & sandstone
- Other: Mudstone

Location
- Coordinates: 34.5°N 118.5°W
- Approximate paleocoordinates: 33.9°N 115.0°W
- Region: Los Angeles County, California
- Country: United States
- Extent: Sierra Pelona Ridge, San Gabriel Mountains

Type section
- Named for: Mint Canyon
- Named by: Kew
- Year defined: 1923
- Mint Canyon Formation (the United States) Mint Canyon Formation (California)

The Mint Canyon Formation is a Miocene geologic formation in the Sierra Pelona Mountains of Los Angeles County, southern California. The formation preserves fossils dating back to the Middle to Late Miocene (Barstovian and Clarendonian in NALMA classification).

== Geology ==
Mint Canyon is a fluvial landform in the Sierra Pelona range. It consists of terrestrial deposits from streams and lakes consisting mostly of sandstone and conglomerate with some claystone.

The formation correlates with the Caliente Formation in the Plush Ranch Basin to the northwest and the lower Punchbowl Formation in the Punchbowl Block to the southeast. The Mint Canyon Formation consists primarily of fluvial, alluvial, and lacustrine conglomerates, sandstones, and mudstones. The Mint Canyon Formation is overlain by the dominantly marine Castaic Formation, which consists of shale, sandstone, and minor conglomerate. In the Texas Canyon sub-basin, the formation is overlain by the Saugus Formation. The contact between the Mint Canyon and Castaic Formations is an angular unconformity in some places, and it is apparently conformable and gradational in others.

== Fossil content ==
The formation preserves vertebrate fossils dating back to the Middle Miocene subperiod of the Neogene period:

=== Mammals ===
==== Artiodactyls ====
- ?Merycodus sp.
- Camelidae indet.
- Tayassuidae indet.

==== Perissodactyls ====
- Hipparion cf. forcei
- Hipparion sp.
- ?Nannippus sp.
- Equini indet.
- Hipparionini indet.
- Rhinocerotidae indet.

==== Rodents ====
- Pronotolagus apachensis

==== Proboscideans ====
- Gomphotherium sp.

==== Carnivora ====
- Canidae indet.

== See also ==
- Neogene Period in California
- List of fossiliferous stratigraphic units in California
- Paleontology in California
- Diligencia Formation
- Plush Ranch Formation
