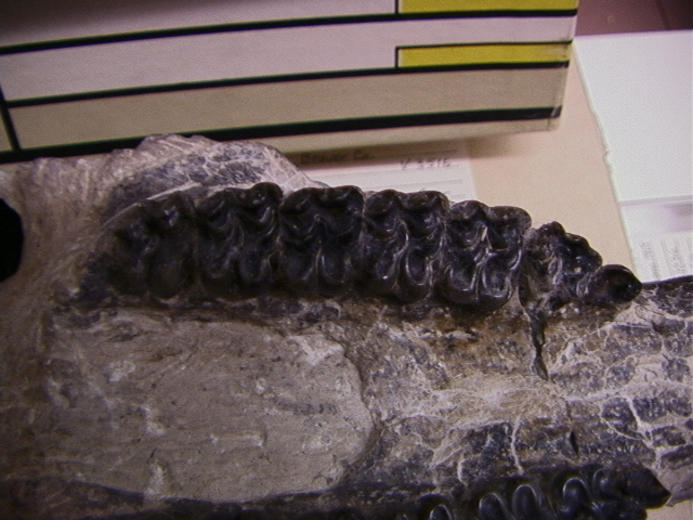
- Scaphohippus sumani jaw

Scientific classification
- Kingdom: Animalia
- Phylum: Chordata
- Class: Mammalia
- Order: Perissodactyla
- Family: Equidae
- Subfamily: Equinae
- Genus: †Scaphohippus; Pagnac 2006

Species
- S. intermontanus; S. sumani

= Scaphohippus =

Scaphohippus Temporal range: Early to middle Miocene 20.6–13.6 Ma

Extinct genus of mammals

Scaphohippus is an extinct Miocene genus of equine, with two known species, known from fossils found in California, New Mexico, Montana, and Nebraska.

== History ==
Both species in the genus were originally described as members of the wastebasket taxon Merychippus in the 1915 by John Merriam. The genus was described from specimens found in the Barstow Formation of the Mojave Desert, California. Specimens of Scaphohippus were medium-sized horses with hypsodont (high-crowned) teeth.

== Phylogenetic relationships ==
The genus is closely related to Protohippus and Calippus. In the Barstow Formation, the two species of Scaphohippus occur with only one other hypsodont horse, Acritohippus stylodontus. Scaphohippus apparently developed on the Great Plains late in the Hemingfordian, about 17 to 16 million years ago and migrated to the Great Basin at about 15 million years ago. The Great Plains and Great Basin were then isolated by tectonic barriers and Scaphohippus became extinct in the Great Plains, but survived in the Great Basin, until the barriers disappeared at about 13 million years ago and Scaphohippus also became extinct in the Great Basin.

== Species ==
=== Scaphohippus sumani ===
Scaphohippus sumani, the type species for the genus, was originally described in 1915 by John Merriam as Merychippus sumani from University of California Museum of Paleontology specimen number UCMP 21422, consisting of four teeth. The specimen was collected from fossiliferous layers of the Barstow Formation outcropping in Rodent Hill Basin, San Bernardino County, California. Specimens of the species have also been found in three other sites in California and one in Nebraska. While numerous specimens of isolated teeth and partial palates have been found at the type locality, comparatively few complete skulls are known. The few examples from the location are badly crushed or have been altered due to pressure during fossilization. Detailed measurement of teeth from the type locality enabled identification of a S. sumani skull from the Punchbowl Formation, Cajon Valley, California and one from the Olcott Formation, Sioux County, Nebraska.

=== Scaphohippus intermontanus ===
Scaphohippus intermontanus, the second species in the genus Scaphohippus, is distinguishable from S. sumani by several distinct features of the teeth. The upper cheek teeth have a height of 40–50 mm at the mesostyle and the protocone connects with the protoconule after approximately 30% wear. The enamel fossettes are both simpler and possess fewer plications than those of S. sumani. The species was first described as Merychippus intermontanus in the same 1915 paper by John Merriam in which "Merychippus" sumani was described. The type specimen for S. intermontanus is a section of jaw containing 6 teeth found in the Hemicyon Tuff, Barstow Formation, that outcrops in Hellgate Basin, San Bernardino County. The species has been confidently identified from several California sites with possible specimens known from Montana and New Mexico.

== Palaeobiology ==
=== Palaeoecology ===
The δ^{13}C values of Scaphohippus sp. from the Barstow Formation of California were higher than those of its non-equid contemporaries and suggest that it was among the most prolific consumers of C_{4} grasses in its environment.
