= Punchbowl Formation =

Geologic formation in California, United States

- Stratigraphic range: Mid-Late Miocene (Clarendonian-Hemphillian); ~14–8 Ma
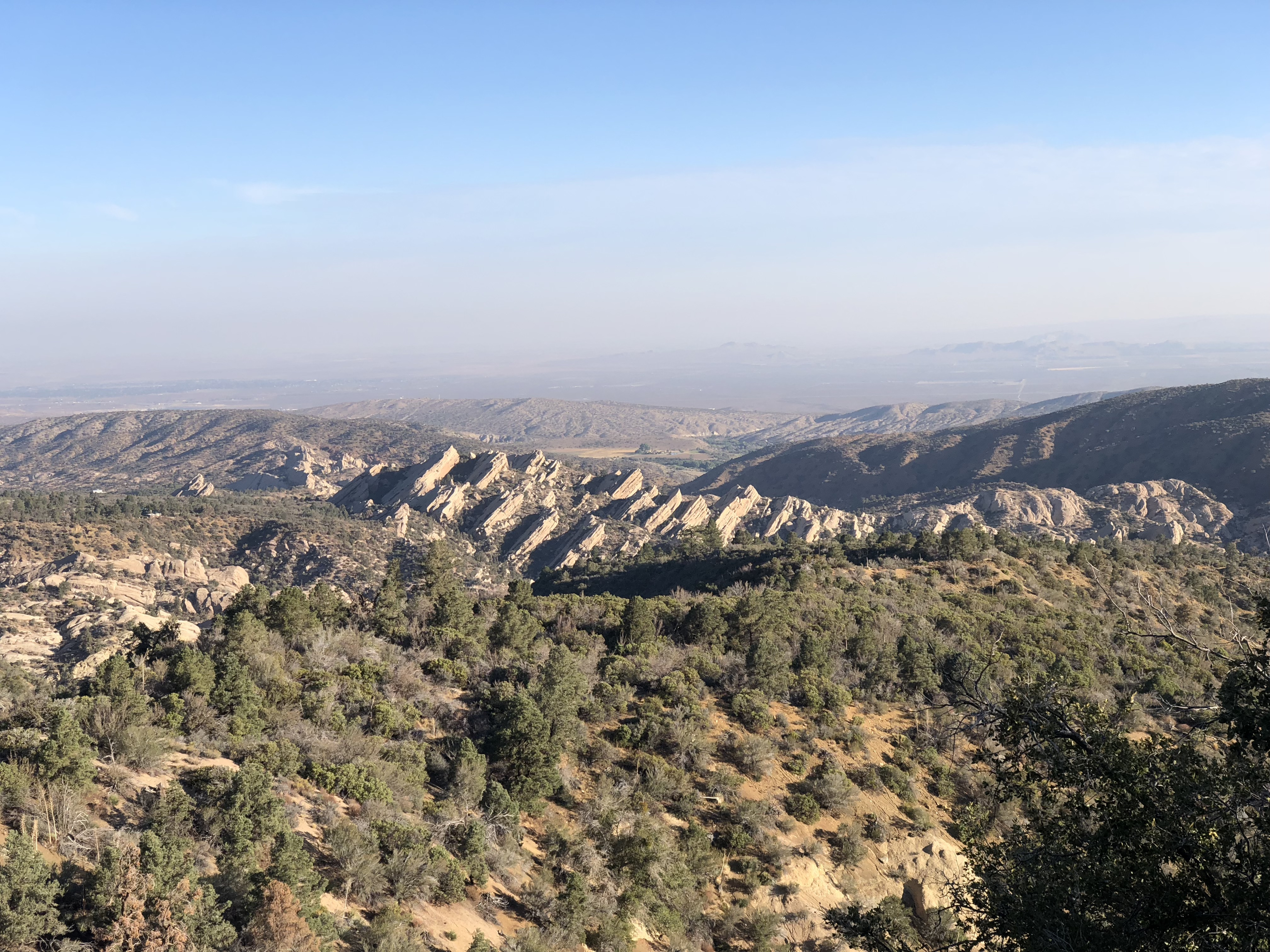
- Outcrop of the tilted formation at the eponymous Devil's Punchbowl
- Type: Formation
- Underlies: Crowder Formation
- Overlies: Paradise Springs Formation

Lithology
- Primary: Conglomerate, sandstone
- Other: Mudstone

Location
- Coordinates: 34.409°N 117.847°W
- Approximate paleocoordinates: 33.4°N 114.4°W
- Region: Los Angeles County, California
- Country: United States
- Extent: San Gabriel Mountains

Type section
- Named for: Devil's Punchbowl
- Named by: Noble
- Year defined: 1953
- Punchbowl Formation (the United States) Punchbowl Formation (California)

The Punchbowl Formation is a sedimentary sandstone geologic formation in the northern San Gabriel Mountains, above the Antelope Valley in Los Angeles County, southern California.

== Geology ==
The sandstone beds of the formation are exposed in the walls of the Devil's Punchbowl, a scenic gorge within the Devil's Punchbowl Natural Area, an L.A. County park within the Angeles National Forest. Three separate faults have folded and uplifted the formation in view. The Devil's Punchbowl is a large plunging sandstone syncline, where the edges of the formation have been folded upward, and the center has dipped. It was formed by the Punchbowl Fault, which is near the San Andreas Fault to the north.

The Punchbowl Formation crops out in the Punchbowl Block and comprises approximately 1,500 metres (4,900 ft) of fluvial and alluvial conglomerates, sandstones, and minor mudstones, which accumulated during the middle-late Miocene. A distinct basal member is middle Miocene in age. The underlying Paradise Springs and Vasquez Formations were formerly interpreted as either part of the basal Punchbowl Formation, or deposits in a fault-bounded sliver along the Punchbowl Fault that originated in a separate basin.

The Devil's Punchbowl drainage flows into Sandrock Creek, a tributary of Big Rock Creek, which disappears into the Mojave Desert.

== Fossil content ==
The uplifted formation preserves fossils dating back to the Neogene period of the Cenozoic geologic era, formed during the lower Pliocene to upper Miocene Ages (~5-10 million years ago).

=== Mammals ===
==== Artiodactyls ====
- Aepycamelus alexandrae
- Bouromeryx americanus
- Brachycrus cf. buwaldi
- Dyseohyus fricki
- Pseudoparablastomeryx cf. scotti
- Brachycrus sp.
- Plioceros sp.
- Antilocapridae indet.
- Blastomerycinae indet.
- Camelidae indet.
- Merycoidodontidae indet.
- Tayassuidae indet.

==== Perissodactyls ====
- Archaeohippus mourningi
- Parapliohippus cf. carrizoensis
- Pliohippus cf. tehonensis
- Scaphohippus intermontanus
- S. sumani
- Cormohipparion sp.
- ?Archaeohippus sp.
- Equini indet.
- Hipparionini indet.
- Rhinocerotidae indet.

==== Carnivora ====
- Borophagus cf. secundus
- Leptarctus ancipidens
- Plionictis sp.

==== Rodents ====
- Petauristodon sp.
- Sciuridae indet.

=== Reptiles ===
==== Turtles ====
- Gopherus depressus

== Gallery ==
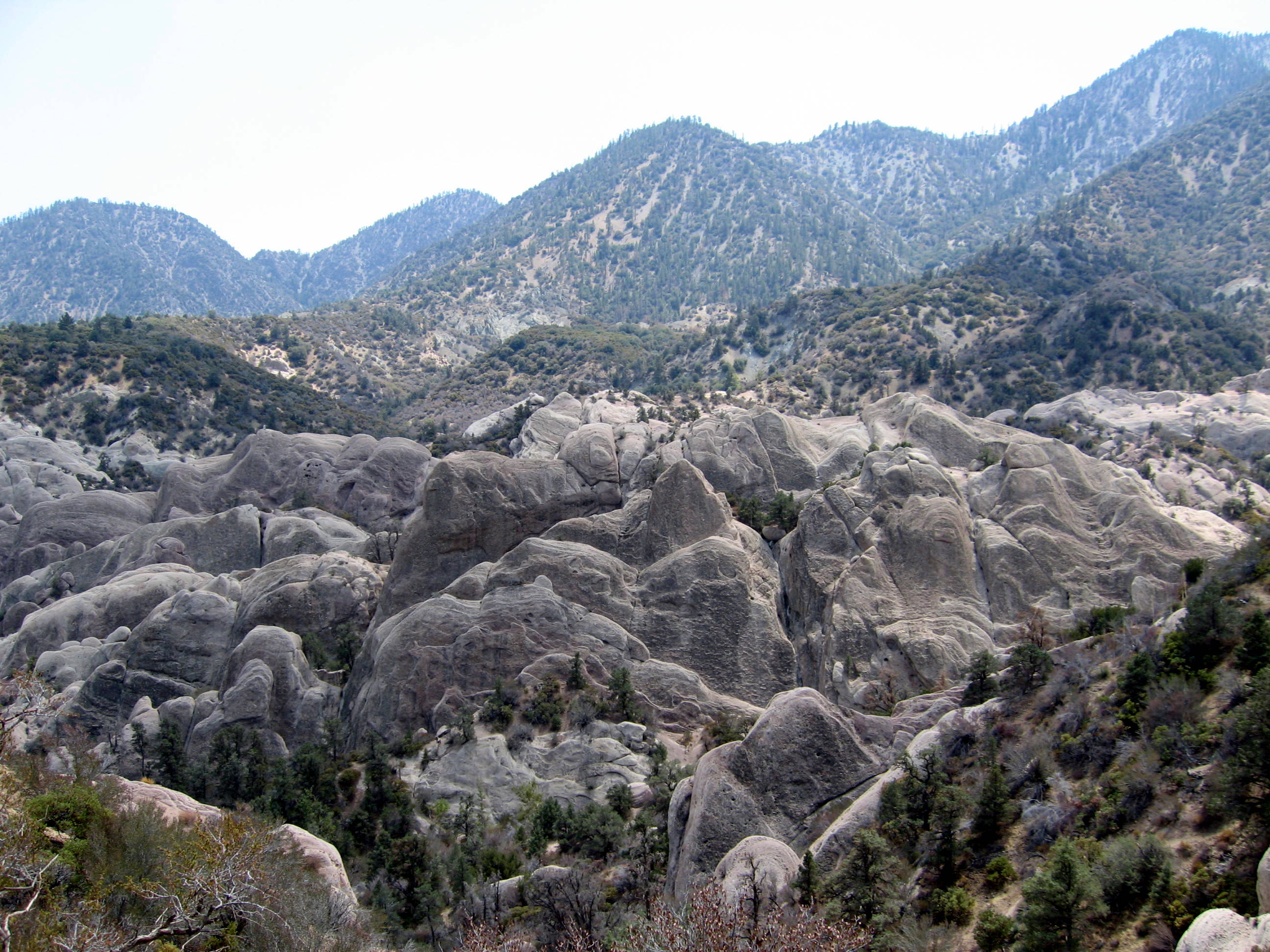
The Devil's Punchbowl

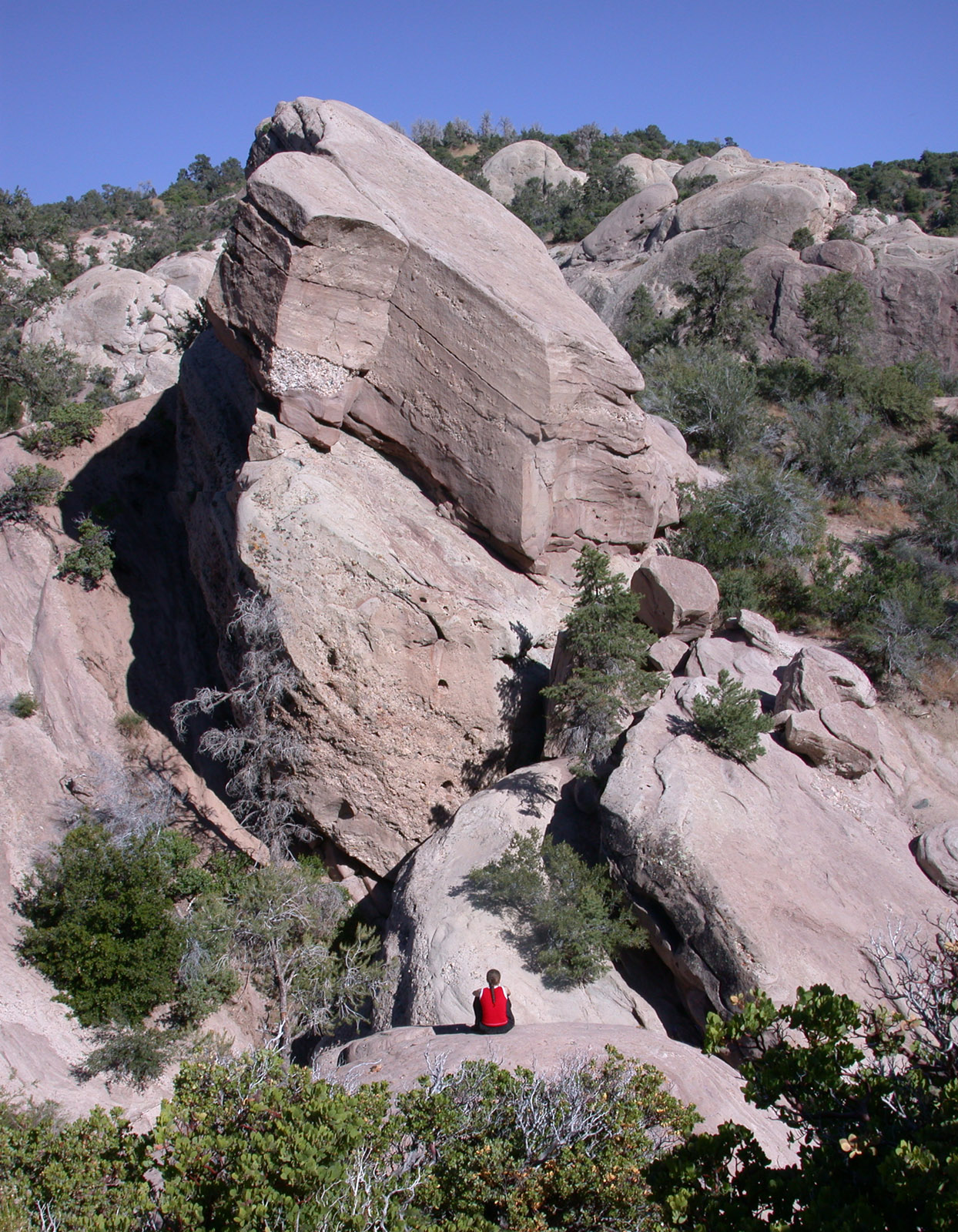
Formation at Devil's Punchbowl

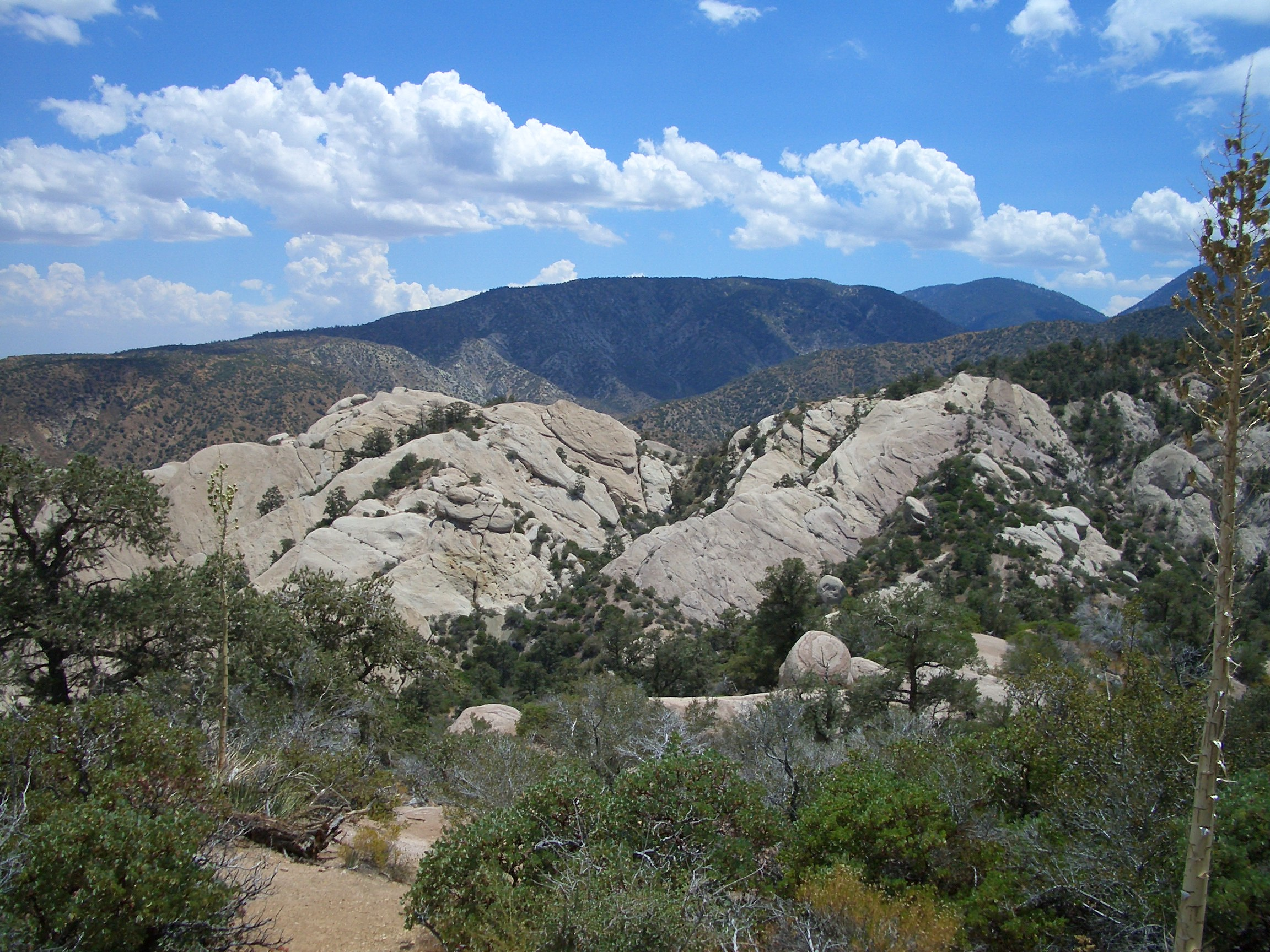
Formation in the Angeles National Forest

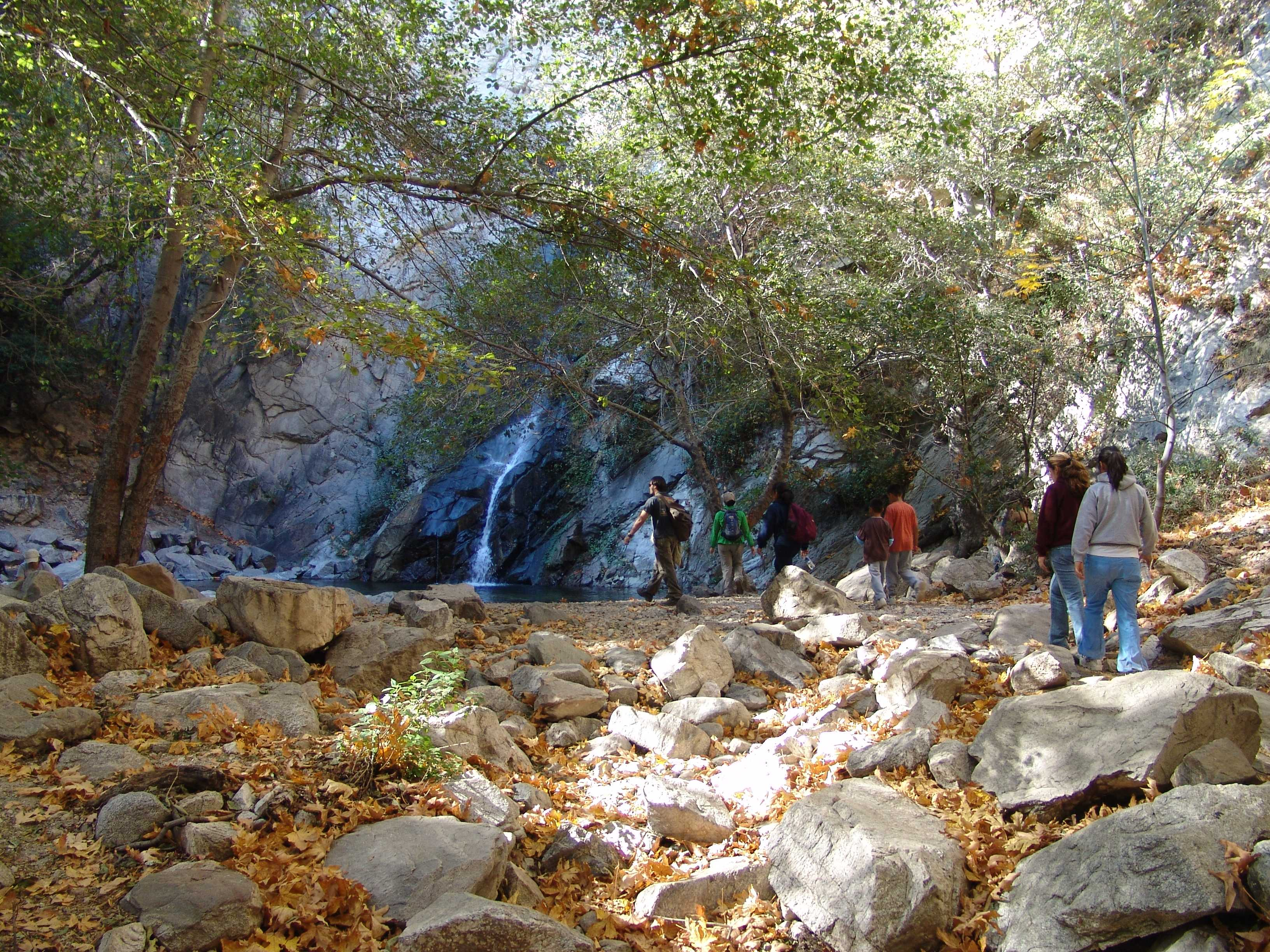
Formation at Sturtevant Falls

== See also ==
- List of fossiliferous stratigraphic units in California
- Neogene period in California
- Paleontology in California
- Diligencia Formation
- Mint Canyon Formation
- Plush Ranch Formation
