= San Francisquito Formation =

Maastrichtian-Danian geologic formation in the Sierra Pelona of California

- Stratigraphic range: Maastrichtian-Danian; ~70–62 Ma
- Type: Geologic formation
- Underlies: Castaic & Punchbowl Formations
- Overlies: San Gabriel Basement Complex
- Thickness: 4 km (13,000 ft)

Lithology
- Primary: Sandy shale

Location
- Coordinates: 34.6°N 118.6°W
- Approximate paleocoordinates: 39.5°N 96.5°W
- Region: Los Angeles County, California
- Country: United States
- Extent: San Gabriel Mountains & Sierra Pelona Mountains
- San Francisquito Formation (the United States) San Francisquito Formation (California)

The San Francisquito Formation is a geologic formation located in northern Los Angeles County, California.

Areas where it is exposed include: San Francisquito Canyon of the Sierra Pelona Mountains, as well as on the northwestern side of the Devil's Punchbowl gorge in the San Gabriel Mountains.

== Geology ==
The San Francisquito Formation consists of marine deposits that originated during the Late Cretaceous period of the Mesozoic Era, and the Early Paleocene epoch in the Paleogene period of the Cenozoic Era. It is overlain by the Punchbowl Formation (east) and Castaic Formation (west), both of the Miocene and Pliocene epochs. It overlies the crystalline San Gabriel Basement Complex.

It is found between the San Andreas Fault on its north, and the Devil's Punchbowl Fault on its south. The Pliocene epoch Crowder Formation is to the northeast.

=== Fossil content ===
It preserves fossils dating back to the Paleogene period.

== See also ==
- Geology of Los Angeles County, California
- List of fossiliferous stratigraphic units in California
- Paleontology in California
- Neenach Volcano
