= California State Route 138 =

Highway in California

State Route 138
- SR 138 highlighted in red

Route information
- Maintained by Caltrans
- Length: 105.376 mi (169.586 km) SR 138 is broken into pieces, and the length does not reflect the SR 14 overlap that would be required to make the route continuous.
- Existed: 1934–present
- Tourist routes: Rim of the World Scenic Byway

Major junctions
- West end: I-5 near Gorman
- CR N2 near Sandberg; SR 14 from Lancaster to Palmdale; CR N6 near Pearblossom; SR 18 near Llano; SR 2 at the Piñon Hills–Phelan border; I-15 at Cajon Junction
- East end: SR 18 near Crestline

Location
- Country: United States
- State: California
- Counties: Los Angeles, San Bernardino

Highway system
- State highways in California; Interstate; US; State; Scenic; History; Pre‑1964; Unconstructed; Deleted; Freeways
← SR 137	→ SR 139

State Route 138 (SR 138) is an east–west state highway in the U.S. state of California that generally follows the northern foothills of the San Gabriel Mountains and the western Mojave Desert. The scenic highway begins in the west at its junction with Interstate 5 located south of Gorman in the Sierra Pelona Mountains, continues eastward through the Antelope Valley and Cajon Pass, to its junction with SR 18 in the east, located in the San Bernardino Mountains south of Crestline.

Except for the western two miles (3.2 km) of the route between Interstate 5 and just east of Gorman Post Road and a segment shared with State Route 14 between Avenue D in Lancaster and Palmdale Boulevard in Palmdale, it is all a mostly undivided two-lane surface road. The remaining section of the Ridge Route, California's first highway connecting the San Joaquin Valley to the Los Angeles Basin, ends at Route 138 near Gorman.

== Route description ==
Route 138 is defined in section 438, subdivision (a) of the California Streets and Highways Code:

Route 138 is from:
(1) Route 5 near Gorman to Route 14 near the City of Lancaster.
(2) Route 14 near the City of Palmdale to Route 18 near Crestline.

The definition omits the concurrency with Route 14 instead of duplicating that segment in the other route's definition in the code. Subdivision (b) permits the state to relinquish control of the segment of the highway within Palmdale to the city.

The western leg of State Route 138 traverses the Lancaster Freeway from Interstate 5 to Gorman Post Road, Lancaster Road from Gorman Post Road to 245th Street West near Neenach School, and Avenue D from 245th Street West to Route 138's north junction with State Route 14. The Lancaster Freeway has four lanes, two for each direction of travel. Both Lancaster Road and Avenue D are 2-lane conventional roads; Avenue D is on a straight alignment over its 22 miles (35 km) between 245th Street West and State Route 14.

After its co-routing with the Antelope Valley Freeway (SR 14) for approximately 14 miles (23 km) through Lancaster and Palmdale, it passes through Palmdale's eastside as four-lane Palmdale Boulevard, 47th Street East, and Fort Tejon Road to Avenue T. At Avenue T it tapers to two lanes and continues straight ahead on Pearblossom Highway through Littlerock, Pearblossom, and Llano to its west junction with State Route 18. Route 18's western terminus siphons off Las Vegas-bound travelers from 138. At its west junction with State Route 18, State Route 138 turns southeast on Antelope Highway to the Los Angeles/San Bernardino County line where it loses its alternative name, Antelope Highway.

Between the county line and Interstate 15, State Route 138 traverses very mountainous and scenic terrain and it connects with State Route 2 that leads to winter resort areas in the San Gabriel Mountains used largely by residents of the Los Angeles metropolitan area. State Route 138 then descends through the West Cajon Valley and crosses Interstate 15 in the Cajon Pass. From Interstate 15 to State Route 173, near the northwest corner of Silverwood Lake, traffic on State Route 138 is rather sparse. The remaining road past Silverwood Lake is mountainous, narrow, and twisting, and not a prime mountain route to the San Bernardino Mountain resorts. The entire segment from Interstate 15 to the eastern terminus of State Route 138 at Mount Anderson Junction is known as the El Cajon-Skyline Forest Highway. State Route 138 and 18 overlap each other in opposing termini, as SR 18's northwest most endpoint is in Llano with SR 138, while SR 138's southmost point is in Crestline with SR 18.

Because of its twisting, mountainous segments and overloaded traffic conditions on its eastern leg, State Route 138 east of Palmdale and west of Interstate 15 is the site of numerous serious auto accidents as of 2004, according to CHP data. One of the chief contributors to accidents on Route 138 of late is drivers passing on the two-lane highway in unsafe conditions. A notable accident in 2003 involved a pickup truck driven by an unlicensed driver leaving the roadway and plunging into the California Aqueduct, killing four occupants of the vehicle and leaving the sole survivor quadriplegic. The State of California paid a $10 million settlement to the victims' family. The area surrounding the highway is also prone to brush fires and flash floods.

SR 138 is part of the California Freeway and Expressway System, and west of the western junction of SR 18 is part of the National Highway System, a network of highways that are considered essential to the country's economy, defense, and mobility by the Federal Highway Administration. SR 138 is eligible to be included in the State Scenic Highway System, but it is not officially designated as a scenic highway by the California Department of Transportation.

The segment of SR 138 from I-15 in the Cajon Pass to SR 18 at Crestline is designated as part of the Rim of the World Scenic Byway, a National Forest Scenic Byway.

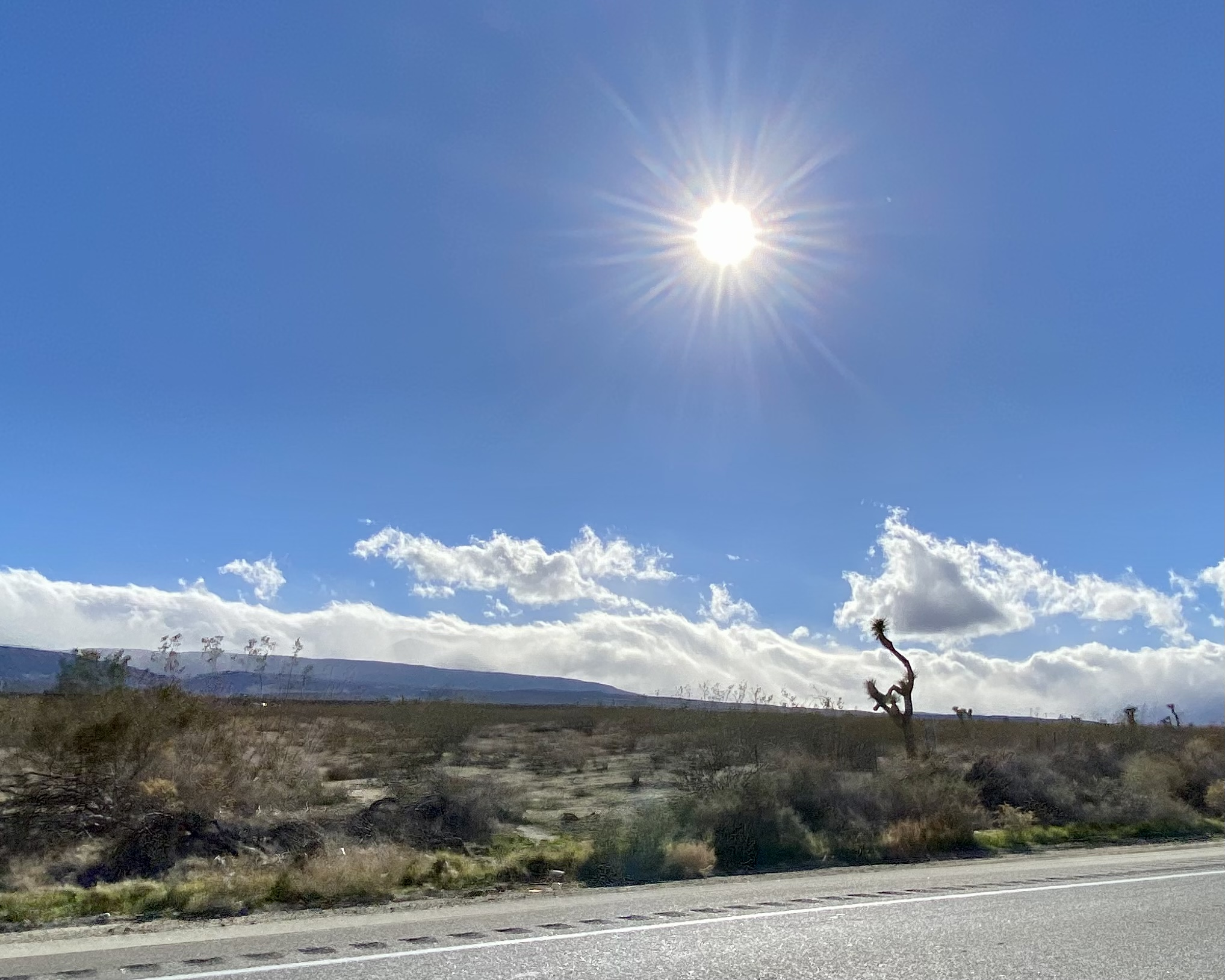
Scenery of Pearblossom Highway feat. Yucca brevifolia

== Future ==
A project to widen the highway to four lanes and add shoulders between Avenue T in Palmdale and Highway 18 in Llano was announced by the California Department of Transportation (Caltrans) in 2009. Work was projected to be completed by Spring 2012. However, as of December 2012, work on the project was still ongoing and several portions remain two lanes. Improvements to the six-mile (9.7 km) stretch between Highway 18 and the Los Angeles/San Bernardino County Line, including widening the shoulders and installing rumble strips, were proposed in February 2013, with no timeline for completion being given.

A proposed bypass to the north of downtown Palmdale has been studied by Caltrans. The bypass would be located east of the Antelope Valley Freeway and south of LA/Palmdale Regional Airport along Avenue P-8, reconnecting with the current SR 138 east of Palmdale.

Caltrans developed a plan to build a 63-mile (101 km) freeway and transit corridor parallel to State Route 138 and State Route 18, known as the "High Desert Corridor". The $8 billion project would have included an eight-lane freeway between Lancaster and Victorville, along with a bikeway, rapid transit, and part of Brightline West, a proposed high-speed rail line linking Los Angeles to Las Vegas. Caltrans put the freeway on hold in 2019.

== Major intersections ==
Except where prefixed with a letter, postmiles were measured on the road as it was in 1964, based on the alignment that existed at the time, and do not necessarily reflect current mileage. Postmile prefixes include: R reflecting a realignment in the route since then, M indicating a second realignment, L referring to an overlap due to a correction or change, and T indicating postmiles classified as temporary. Segments that remain unconstructed or have been relinquished to local control may be omitted. The numbers reset at county lines; the start and end postmiles in each county are given in the county column.

County	Location	Postmile	Exit	Destinations	Notes
Los Angeles; LA R0.00-74.97		R0.00		I-5 south (Golden State Freeway) – Los Angeles	I-5 north exit 198A; west end of SR 138
Los Angeles; LA R0.00-74.97		R0.24	—	Quail Lake Road	Westbound exit and eastbound entrance
Los Angeles; LA R0.00-74.97		R0.63	—	I-5 north (Golden State Freeway) – Sacramento	Westbound exit and eastbound entrance; I-5 south exit 199
Los Angeles; LA R0.00-74.97			East end of freeway		
Los Angeles; LA R0.00-74.97		4.11		CR N2 (Old Ridge Route Road)	Western terminus of CR N2; former US 99 south
Los Angeles; LA R0.00-74.97		36.87 R74.00 (Note: Indicates that the postmile represents the distance along SR 14 rather than SR 138.)		SR 14 north (Antelope Valley Freeway) / Avenue D (to Sierra Highway) – Mojave	Interchange; west end of SR 14 overlap; SR 14 exit 49; exit numbers follow SR 14
Los Angeles; LA R0.00-74.97		36.87 R74.00	West end of freeway on SR 14		
Los Angeles; LA R0.00-74.97		R72.00	47	Avenue F	
Los Angeles; LA R0.00-74.97	Lancaster	R70.99	46	Avenue G	
Los Angeles; LA R0.00-74.97	Lancaster	R69.99	45	Avenue H	
Los Angeles; LA R0.00-74.97	Lancaster	R68.97	44	Avenue I	
Los Angeles; LA R0.00-74.97	Lancaster	R67.96	43	Avenue J (CR N5)	No westbound exit; serves Antelope Valley Medical Center
Los Angeles; LA R0.00-74.97	Lancaster	R67.39	43	20th Street West	Westbound exit only
Los Angeles; LA R0.00-74.97	Lancaster	R66.73	42	Avenue K	Serves Antelope Valley Medical Center (westbound only), Antelope Valley College
Los Angeles; LA R0.00-74.97	Lancaster	R65.68	41	Avenue L	
Los Angeles; LA R0.00-74.97	Lancaster–Palmdale line	R64.68	40	Avenue M	Also known as Columbia Way
Los Angeles; LA R0.00-74.97	Palmdale	R63.67	39	Avenue N	Also known as R. Lee Ermey Avenue
Los Angeles; LA R0.00-74.97	Palmdale	R61.77	37	10th Street West	Eastbound exit and westbound entrance; serves LA/Palmdale Regional Airport
Los Angeles; LA R0.00-74.97	Palmdale	R61.37	37	Rancho Vista Boulevard	Westbound exit and eastbound entrance; formerly signed as Avenue P; serves LA/Palmdale Regional Airport
Los Angeles; LA R0.00-74.97	Palmdale	R59.80 43.42	East end of freeway on SR 14		
Los Angeles; LA R0.00-74.97	Palmdale	R59.80 43.42		SR 14 south (Antelope Valley Freeway) / CR N2 west (Palmdale Boulevard west) – Los Angeles, Lake Hughes	Interchange; east end of SR 14 overlap; eastern terminus of CR N2; SR 14 exit 35; Palmdale Boulevard serves Palmdale Regional Medical Center
Los Angeles; LA R0.00-74.97	Palmdale	R48.51		50th Street East, Palmdale Boulevard east – Sun Village	Roundabout
Los Angeles; LA R0.00-74.97	Pearblossom	60.17		CR N6 (Longview Road) – Valyermo, Devil's Punchbowl, Big Rock Camp	Northern terminus of CR N6
Los Angeles; LA R0.00-74.97	Llano	67.88		CR N4 (Largo Vista Road)	Northern terminus of CR N4
Los Angeles; LA R0.00-74.97	Llano	69.30		SR 18 east (Palmdale Road) – Victorville	Western (counterclockwise) terminus of SR 18
San Bernardino; SBD 0.00-R37.85	Phelan	5.76		Sheep Creek Road – Phelan	Interchange; westbound exit only
San Bernardino; SBD 0.00-R37.85	Phelan	6.66		SR 2 west (Angeles Crest Highway) – Wrightwood, Big Pines	Eastern terminus of SR 2
San Bernardino; SBD 0.00-R37.85	Cajon Junction	R15.20		I-15 (Mojave Freeway) – Victorville, San Bernardino	Interchange; I-15 exit 131
San Bernardino; SBD 0.00-R37.85				Cajon Pass, elevation 3,777 feet (1,151 m)	
San Bernardino; SBD 0.00-R37.85	Hesperia	R23.96		SR 173 – Hesperia	Western terminus of SR 173
San Bernardino; SBD 0.00-R37.85		R26.50		Cleghorn Road – Silverwood Lake	Interchange
San Bernardino; SBD 0.00-R37.85	Crestline	R37.85		SR 18 – Crestline, San Bernardino	Interchange; east end of SR 138
1.000 mi = 1.609 km; 1.000 km = 0.621 mi: Concurrency terminus; Incomplete access

== In popular culture ==
Parts of the distinctive highway were used in the filming of the movie The Long, Long Trailer, a 1954 comedy with Lucille Ball and Desi Arnaz. Despite the rapid growth of Southern California in the ensuing fifty years, the segment shown in the movie is little changed since the movie was filmed.

David Hockney composed the picturesque photographic collage Pearblossom Highway in 1986 off the segment of Route 138 bearing that moniker. It may be viewed at the Getty Museum in Los Angeles.

== See also ==
- David Hockney
