= Crowder Formation =

Geologic formation in California, United States

- Stratigraphic range: Pliocene
- Type: Geologic formation
- Underlies: Harold Formation, Shoemaker Gravel
- Overlies: Punchbowl Formation

Location
- Region: Mojave Desert, in San Gabriel Mountains and San Bernardino Mountains, Los Angeles County, San Bernardino County, California
- Country: United States

The Crowder Formation is a geologic formation in the Central and Western Mojave Desert, in northern Los Angeles County and eastern San Bernardino County, in Southern California.

Areas where it is exposed include at the bases of the northern San Gabriel Mountains and northwestern San Bernardino Mountains, and in the Cajon Pass between them.

== Geology ==
The Crowder Formation was formed during the Pliocene epoch of the Neogene period. The formation was deposited by drainages carrying distinctive volcanic and metamorphic clasts from the Victorville area southward.

It overlies the crystalline San Gabriel Basement Complex in its eastern section, and the San Francisquito Formation in its western section in the Antelope Valley/San Gabriels.

=== Fossils ===
The formation preserves fossils of insects, reptiles, rodents, birds, and larger mammals. The species date back to the Miocene and Pliocene epochs of the Neogene period. 29 taxa were collected by the San Bernardino County Museum from the Cajon Pass area of the Crowder Formation.

== See also ==
- Neogene geologic formations in California
- List of fossiliferous stratigraphic units in California
- Paleontology in California
