= Cajon Junction =

Unincorporated community in California, United States

Coordinates: 34°18′42″N 117°28′29″W

Cajon Junction is an unincorporated community in Cajon Canyon and the northern Cajon Pass area, within San Bernardino County, California.

It is located at the intersection of California State Route 138 (Pearblossom Highway) and Interstate 15

It lies at an elevation of 3,113 feet (949 meters), above the southern Victor Valley in the northeastern San Gabriel Mountains foothills.

== Train incidents ==
Cajon Junction is the site of two train wrecks that occurred in 1994 and 1996.

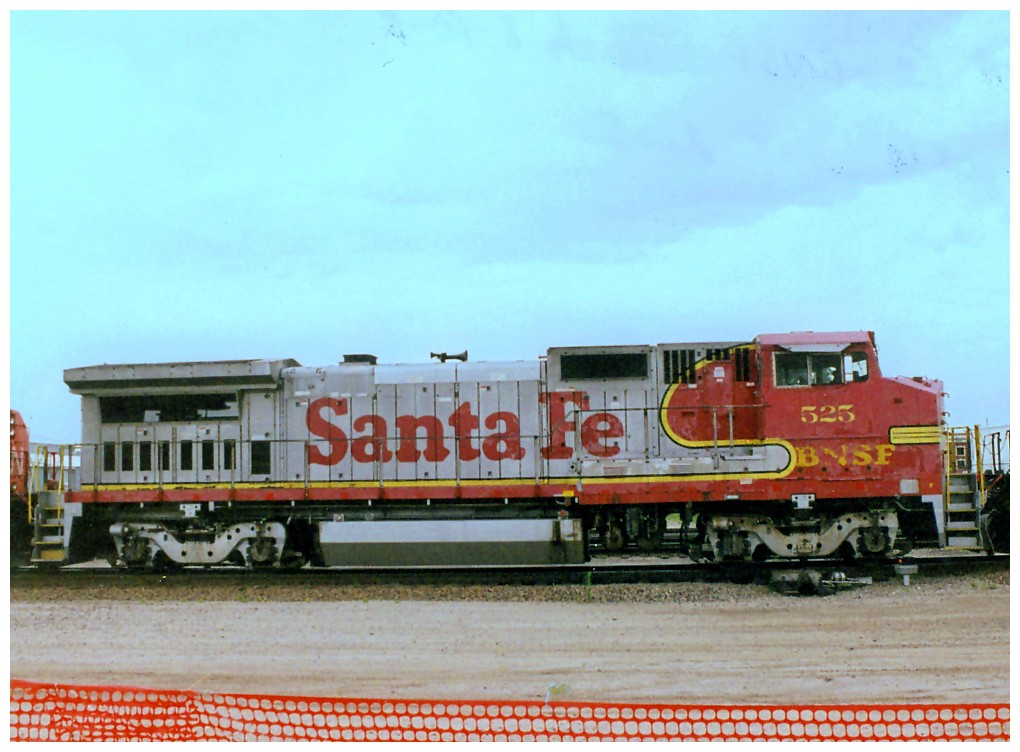
A Dash 8-40BW that's the same type as the lead engine of PBHLA-10.

- The 1994 Cajon Pass Runaway:

On December 14, 1994, at 5:12 A.M., a Santa Fe Railway intermodal train, PBHLA-10 (#576 West), lost its brakes and lost control on Cajon Pass and rear-ended a stopped Union Pacific coal train, CUWLA 1-10 (#9450 West) below the California State Route 138 overpass at milepost 61.55 between Cajon and Alray. The incident was caused by a blockage in the air hose and several brake failures on several container cars on the Santa Fe train, causing it to lose control and crash into the coal train from behind causing a major derailment and fire. Thankfully, both the UP crew and the ATSF crew survived, even though the Santa Fe crew suffered minor Injuries when they jumped from their train going 50 mph. The estimated damage caused by the wreck was $4,012,900.

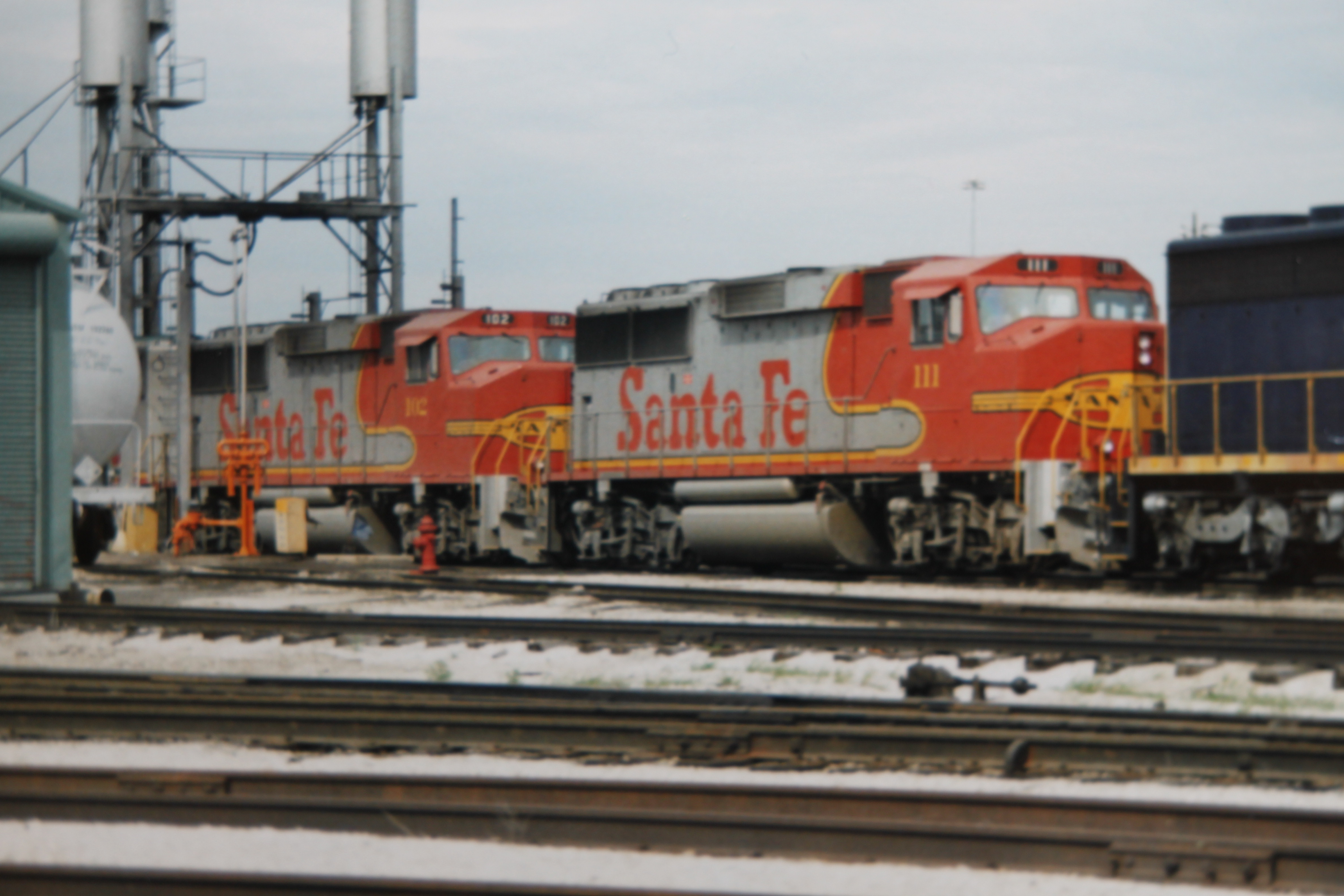
A pair of Santa Fe GP60Ms at Corwith Yard the same type as the lead engine of HBALT 1-31.

- The 1996 Cajon Pass Runaway:

On February 1, 1996, at 4:10 A.M., a Santa Fe Railway manifest train, HBALT 1-31, Loaded With:

  - General Merchandise
  - Iron Coils
  - Lumber
  - Plastic Pellets
  - Tires
  - Pipes
  - Filler Board

and hazardous materials like Pesticides in seven tanker cars, derailed on a sharp curve on a trestle bridge, causing the tankers to explode and the train caught fire. The conductor died after jumping from the train and smashing his head into a rock, while the brakeman survived but later died from carbon monoxide poisoning from the fire, while the engineer survived. Due to the severity of the wreck and the toxic nature of the smoke emitted from the chemicals in the tankers and creating the risk of a Boiling Liquid Expanding Vapor Explosion as a result, California State Route 138 and Interstate 15 were shut down, and other highways and freeways were to, until they were finally reopened. A memorial stands at the site of the crash today for the two crew members that died in the derailment.

Although both runaways didn't happen in the same spot as the 1989 San Bernardino train disaster or the 1989 Cajon Pass Runaway, they're still incidents that happened on Cajon Pass.

== Other incidents ==
Cajon Junction has also had other incidents that happened before in the same area as the 1994 and 1996 runaways.

- Semi-truck crash:

A semi-truck crashed off the southbound I-15 and hit a power pole, causing the closure of lanes and traffic congestion on June 27, 2025. The driver was uninjured, and the cause of the accident is under investigation.

- Motorcycle fatality:

A motorcyclist, Donald Post, died after colliding with a sedan on the southbound I-15 on May 15, 2025.

- Multi-vehicle crashes:
  - A five-vehicle collision on northbound I-15 near Highway 138 occurred during heavy fog on May 2, 2025, injuring six people and causing significant traffic delays.
  - A car drove off the southbound I-15 embankment on December 1, 2024, requiring a rescue operation. The driver sustained minor injuries.
- Law enforcement incidents:
  - The I-15 was shut down in both directions after a pursuit ended in shots fired near the 138 on October 15, 2024.
  - A heist crew was arrested during a train burglary in April 2024.
- Fire incident:

A big rig fire on the southbound I-15 caused major traffic delays on July 26, 2024.

- Targeted Shooting:

A boy suffered a gunshot wound to the leg after a vehicle was targeted on June 29, 2024.
