= Vasquez Rocks =

Natural area park in Agua Dulce, California

Coordinates: 34°28′48″N 118°19′00″W

- U.S. National Register of Historic Places
- U.S. Historic district
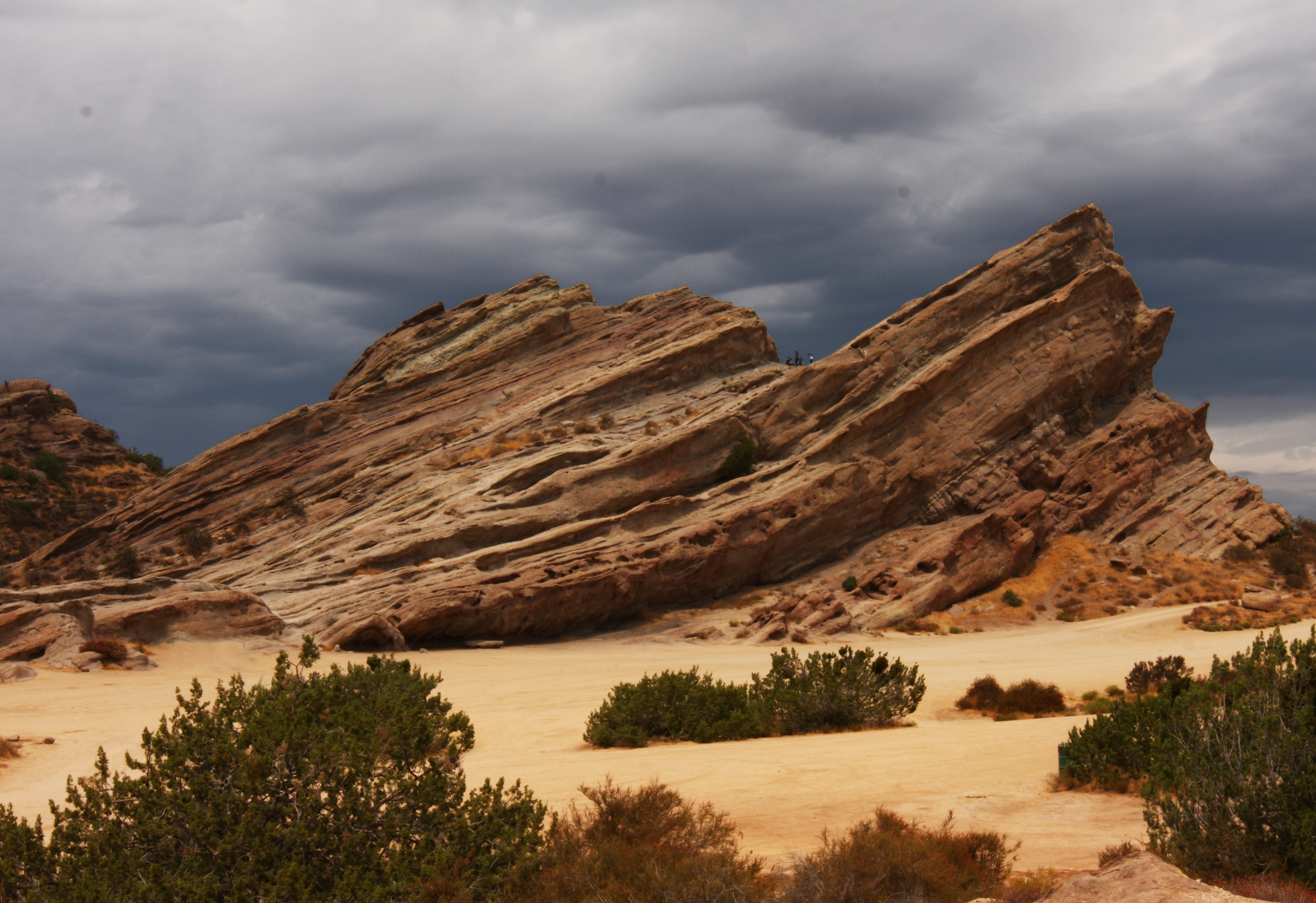
- Vasquez Rocks

- Location within the Los Angeles metropolitan area Location within California Location within the United States
- Location: 10700 Escondido Canyon Road; Agua Dulce, California 91390
- NRHP reference No.: 72000228
- Added to NRHP: June 22, 1972

Vasquez Rocks Natural Area Park is a 932-acre (377-hectare) park located in the Sierra Pelona in northern Los Angeles County, California. It is known for its rock formations, the result of sedimentary layering and later tectonic uplift. It is located near the town of Agua Dulce, between the cities of Santa Clarita and Palmdale. The area is visible from the Antelope Valley Freeway (State Route 14). Its location approximately 25 miles (40 km) from downtown Los Angeles places it within Hollywood's "studio zone" and makes it a popular filming location for films and television programs.

== History ==
These rock formations were formed by rapid erosion during uplift about 25 million years ago, and then later exposed by uplift activity along the San Andreas Fault.

The Tataviam people were living at the Vasquez Rocks when the Spanish arrived and still live in the region, with a modern tribal government. The village of Mapipinga was located here. Their language was most likely a Uto-Aztecan language of the Takic subfamily. They lived in grass huts within villages. With the coming of the Spanish missions, some of these people were forced to work there. They eventually began speaking Spanish and inter-marrying with other tribes.

In 1874, Tiburcio Vásquez, one of California's most notorious Mexican bandidos, used these rocks to elude capture by law enforcement. His name has since been associated with this geologic feature.

The land and rock formations were acquired gradually by Los Angeles County, beginning with a donation of 40 acres in 1971, with more parcels being added through 2001. The Pacific Crest Trail crosses through the park.

Vasquez Rocks was added to the National Register of Historic Places (site #72000228) in 1972 because of its significance as a prehistoric site for the Shoshone and Tataviam people.

== Formation ==
Literature reviews have dated the earliest sedimentation of the Vasquez Formation occurring between the later portion of the Oligocene Epoch to the lower Miocene Epoch, each respectively 33.9-23 million years ago and 23.03-5.3 million years ago.

The Vasquez Formation resides within the Soledad Basin, an orthogonal rift between the Sierra Pelona Mountains to the northwest and the San Gabriel Mountains to the east, which are both within the province of the Transverse Mountain Range of Southern California. The San Andreas Fault runs parallel behind the Sierra Pelona Mountains and separates the formation from the North American plate.

The Vasquez Formation consists of alluvial sediments that eroded from the Sierra Pelona and San Gabriel Mountains and were deposited in alluvial fans on both sides of the Soledad Basin. Erosion of the sediment included processes like rain, floods, wind, and earthquakes. Over the course of millions of years, the sediment was laid down under alternating lacustrine and fluviatile conditions. Once laid flat across the basin floor, immense pressure converted the layers into sandstone, which became covered with younger sediment deposits. The sediment beds reside in a sharply folded syncline.

Due to its proximity to the San Andreas Fault, tectonic activity has been an important factor in the reshaping, uplift, and exposure of the buried sandstone. The Elkhorn Fault, an offshoot of the San Andreas Fault, runs through the Vasquez Rocks Natural Area Park. Other faults, such as the Pelona, Vasquez Canyon, Soledad, and San Gabriel Faults, are all within proximity of the formation. The most exposed portion of the Vasquez Formation is the oldest tertiary formation within the east portion of the Ventura Basin.

The Vasquez Rocks consist mainly of coarse-grained conglomerate and breccia sediments, which were deposited adjacent to active faults during rapid uplift and consequent erosion of the San Gabriel Mountains. Approximately 25 million years ago (late Oligocene time), the collision of the North American and Pacific tectonic plates uplifted the area along the Elkhorn Fault. Energetic erosion of the highland along with uplift and volcanism caused debris flow sediments to be distributed in alluvial fans into a rapidly subsiding rift known as the Soledad Basin. These sediments were buried and lithified through the Miocene and became exposed more recently via activity along the San Andreas Fault system. The strata are now highly tilted and disconnected from their source area. The strata were deformed and offset by the later fault activity. The distinctive hogback ridges of steeply inclined strata serve to graphically demonstrate the significant fault activity in the area. It is possible to see the extreme variance in grain size between layers of sediment where the strata are exposed. These sedimentary rocks, named the Mint Canyon Formation, were laid down about 8-15 million years ago. In the upper layers, many animal fossils have been found, including camels, horses and rodents.

Soil surveyors mapped much of the park as Rock Land with no soil cover; where soil exists the dominant series is Gaviota gravelly loam which ranges from 6 to 20 inches thick.

== Ecology ==
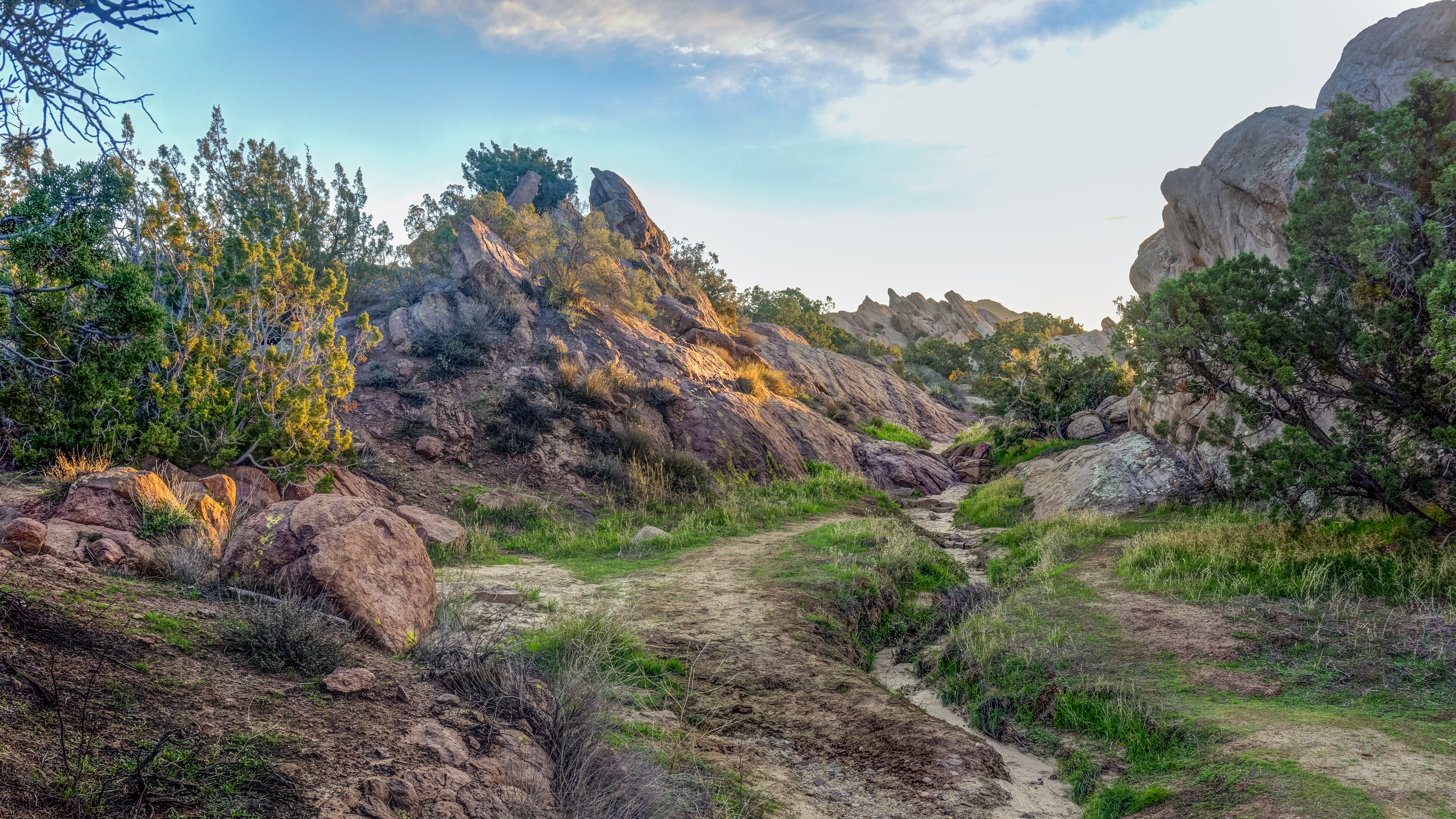
Shaded strands of scrub oak, California juniper, California sagebrush, and short grasses within Vasquez Rocks

The ecology of the park is characteristic of the California montane chaparral and woodlands ecoregion. The park is primarily covered in short grasses, scrub oak trees, California junipers, yucca, and other chaparral shrubs such as California sagebrush and California buckwheat.

== Role in entertainment ==
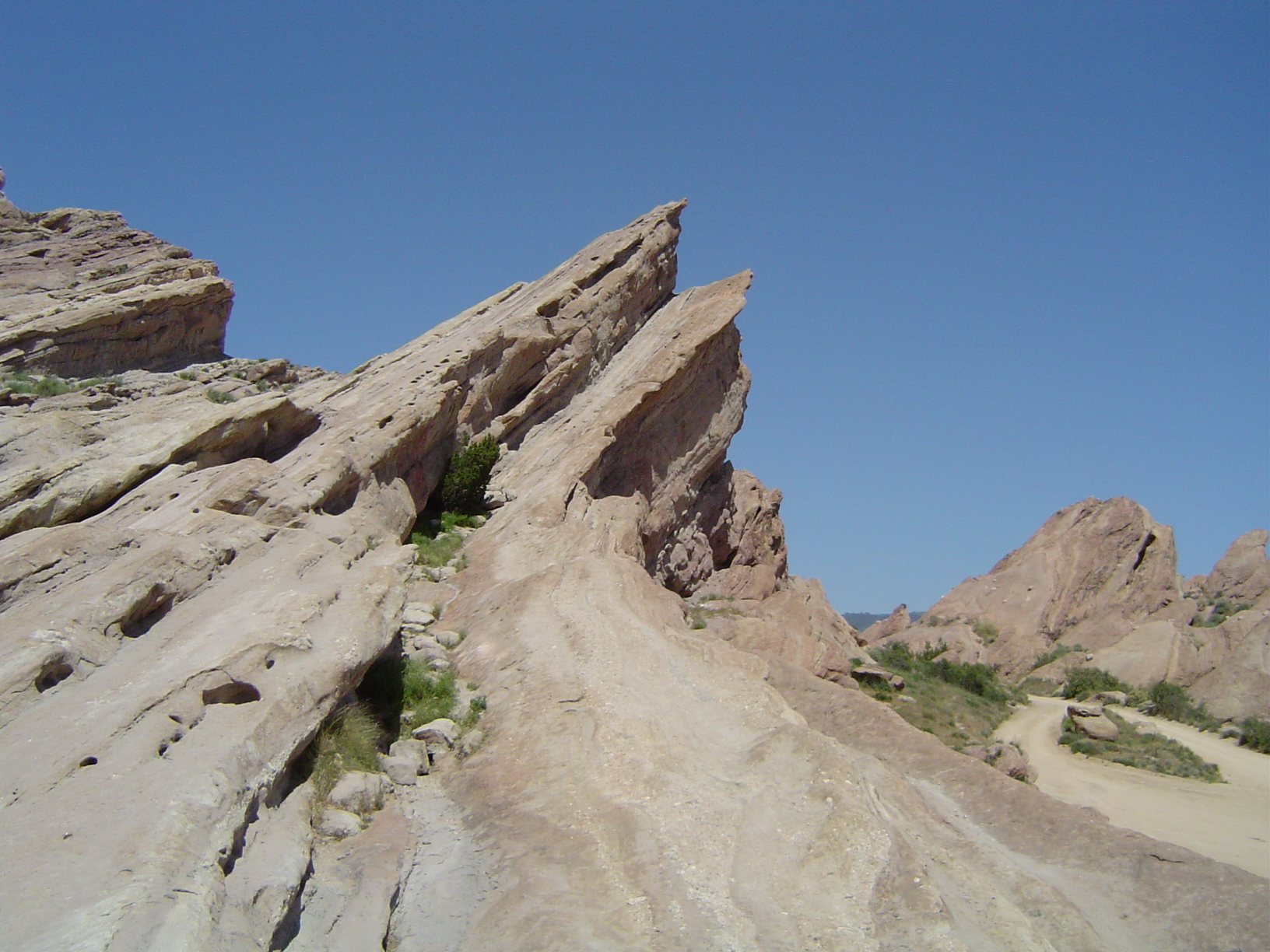
A prominent rock formation featured in numerous films and television productions.

The park's visually interesting terrain and proximity to Hollywood have made it a frequently used filming location since the 1930s. As it was within the studio zone, union actors and crew could be asked to work there without producers needing to pay extra. Producer Stanley Bergerman chose it to represent Tibet in the film Werewolf of London (1935). It became popular as a setting in Westerns in the 1940s and 1950s, followed by numerous television series.

The prominent rock formation is featured as fictional alien settings in four episodes of the original late 1960s Star Trek series, from which it gained the nickname "Kirk's Rock". The location was subsequently used the same way in the films Star Trek IV: The Voyage Home (1986) and Star Trek (2009), and episodes of Star Trek: The Next Generation, Star Trek Voyager, and Star Trek: Enterprise. Star Trek: Picard features scenes set and filmed at Vasquez Rocks, making it the first time the rocks have been seen as themselves in the franchise. Futurama pays homage to its usage in Star Trek in the episode "Where No Fan Has Gone Before", in which most of the original series actors and broadcast tapes are transported to an alien planet whose landscape prominently features rocks modeled after those at Vasquez.

== Activities ==
Vasquez Rocks Natural Area Park is open from sunrise to sunset for outdoor activities. The park has equestrian areas, picnic areas, hiking trails, and rock climbing. The Pacific Crest Trail passes through Vasquez Rocks Natural Area Park and can be used for short as well as lengthy hikes. Special events can also be hosted there, such as star parties and weddings.

== See also ==
- Bronson Canyon, another Southern California landmark used as a set for numerous films
- Soledad Canyon
