= Harold Formation =

Geologic formation in California, United States

- Stratigraphic range: Cenozoic Era
- Type: Geologic formation
- Overlies: Crowder Formation

Location
- Region: Mojave Desert, San Bernardino County, California
- Country: United States

The Harold Formation is a geologic formation in the Central Mojave Desert, west of Victorville and north of the San Gabriel Mountains, in eastern San Bernardino County, Southern California.

== Geology ==
The formation, with Shoemaker Gravel in other areas, overlies the Pliocene epoch Crowder Formation.

The Harold Formation preserves Cenozoic Era fossils.

== See also ==
- Cenozoic California geologic formations
- List of fossiliferous stratigraphic units in California
- Paleontology in California
