= Mapipinga =

Tataviam village

Coordinates: 34.4930°N 118.3284°W

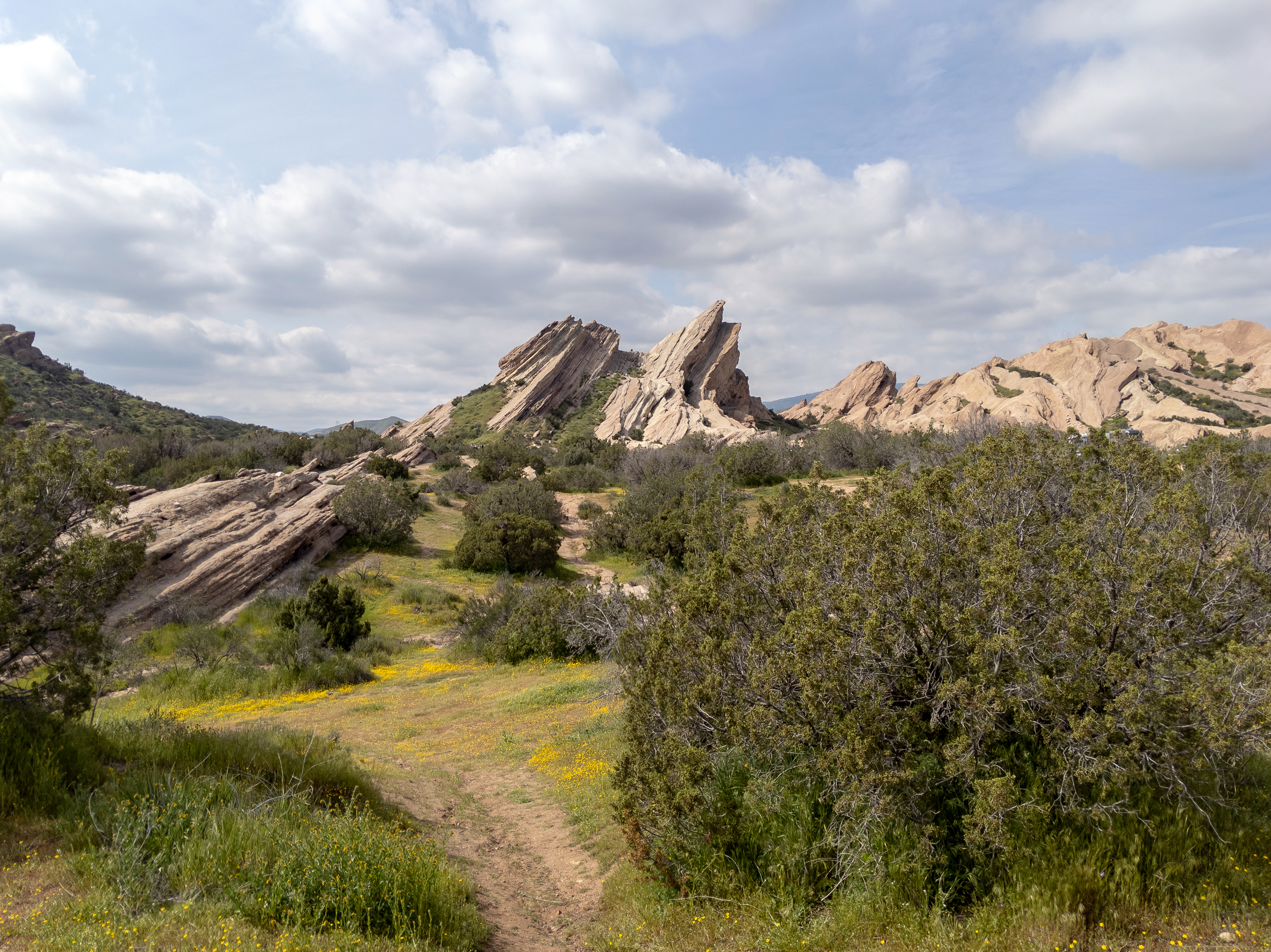
Vasquez Rocks

Mapipinga was a Tataviam village now located in the Vasquez Rocks Natural Park Area. People from the village were known as Mapipibit (singular) and Mapipivitam (plural). The village declined with the arrival of the Spanish and the establishment of Mission San Fernando in the area.

== Village life ==
The village was organized as an independent city-state government. The villagers engaged in collective economic and ceremonial activities and traded with nearby villages. Like many Tatatviam villages, the primary social responsibility of the village people was to their village.

Primary food sources for the village were yucca, juniper, and sage.

== Decline ==
With the arrival of the Franciscan missionaries backed by soldiers of the Spanish Empire, the village was consistently put under stress from the demands of Mission San Fernando for converts and labor. People were taken from the village in the early 1800s.

Over time, the village was depleted of people and ceased to function as it had for thousands of years. In the records of the Spanish missions, it is documented that "a thirty-five year old man, said to be chief of Mapipinga" was baptized.
