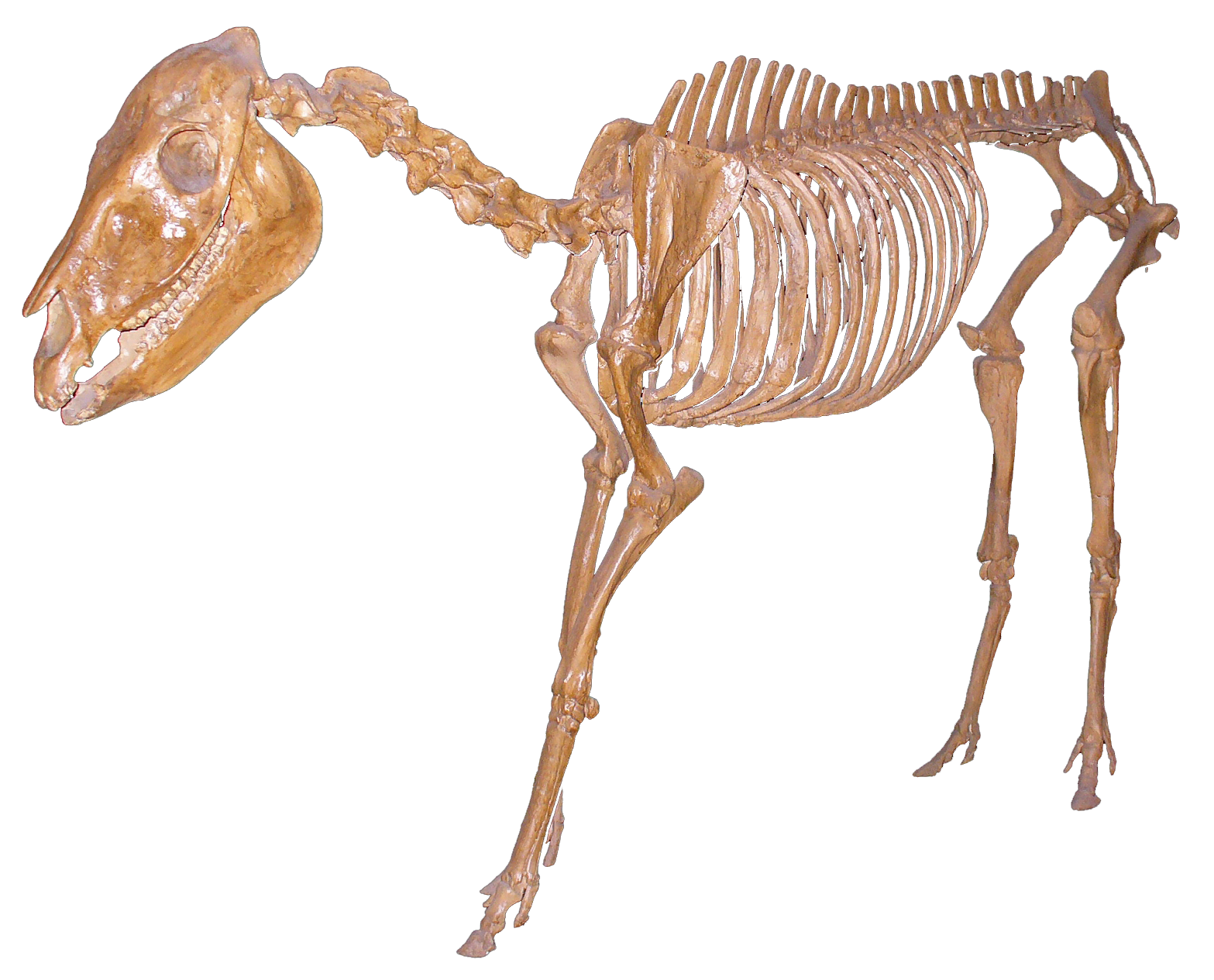
- Skeletal reconstruction of Merychippus on display at the American Museum of Natural History

Scientific classification
- Kingdom: Animalia
- Phylum: Chordata
- Class: Mammalia
- Order: Perissodactyla
- Family: Equidae
- Subfamily: Equinae
- Genus: †Merychippus; Leidy, 1856

Type species
- †Merychippus insignis Leidy, 1856

Species
- Species: †M. brevidontus Bode, 1935; †M. calamarius Cope, 1875; †M. californicus Merriam, 1915; †M. coalingensis Clark, 1921; †M. coloradense Osborn, 1918; †M. eohipparion Osborn, 1918; †M. eoplacidus Osborn, 1918; †M. gunteri Simpson, 1930; †M. insignis Cope, 1874; †M. labrosus Cope, 1874; †M. missouriensis Douglass, 1908; †M. patrusus Osborn, 1918; †M. primus Osborn, 1918; †M. proparvulus Osborn, 1918; †M. quartus Stirton, 1940; †M. quintus Kelly and Lander, 1988; †M. relictus Cope, 1889; †M. republicanus Osborn, 1918; †M. secundus Abel, 1928; †M. sejunctus Cope, 1874; †M. seversus Cope, 1878; †M. stevensi Dougherty, 1940

= Merychippus =

Merychippus Temporal range: Miocene, 15.9–5.3 Ma

Extinct genus of horses

Merychippus is an extinct proto-horse of the family Equidae that was endemic to North America during the Miocene, 15.97–5.33 million years ago. It had three toes on each foot and is the first horse known to have grazed.

== Discovery and naming ==
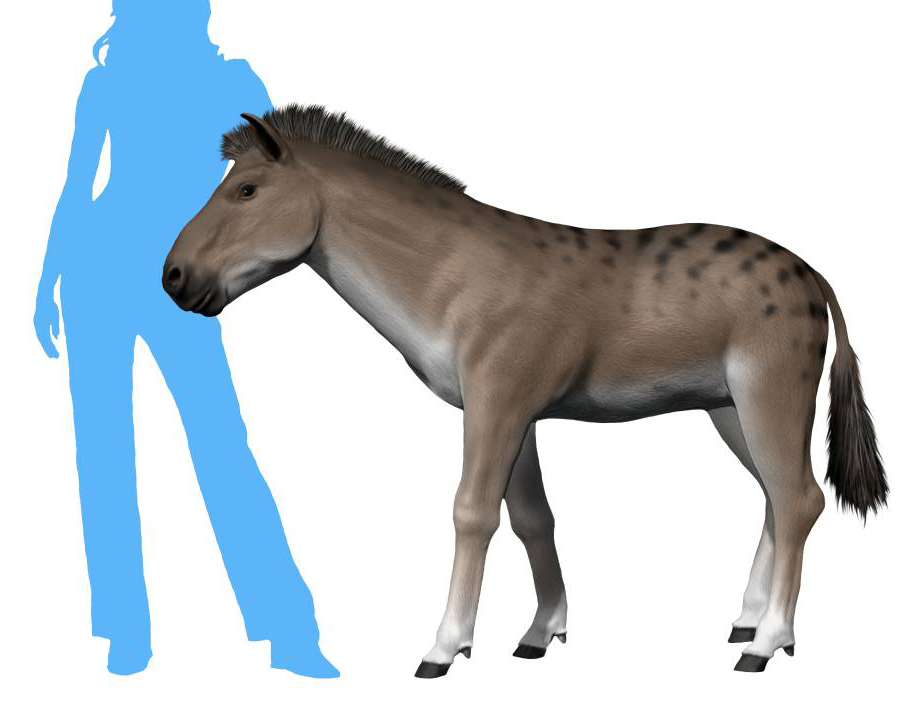
Restoration of Merychippus insignis

Merychippus was named by Joseph Leidy (1856). Numerous authors assigned the type species – Merychippus insignis – to Protohippus, but this is ignored. It was assigned to the Equidae by Leidy (1856) and Carroll (1988), and to the Equinae by MacFadden (1998) and Bravo-Cuevas and Ferrusquía-Villafranca (2006). The genus name comes from Ancient Greek μηρυκασθαι (mērukasthai), meaning "to ruminate", and ἵππος (híppos), meaning "horse", but current evidence does not support Merychippus ruminating.

== Description ==
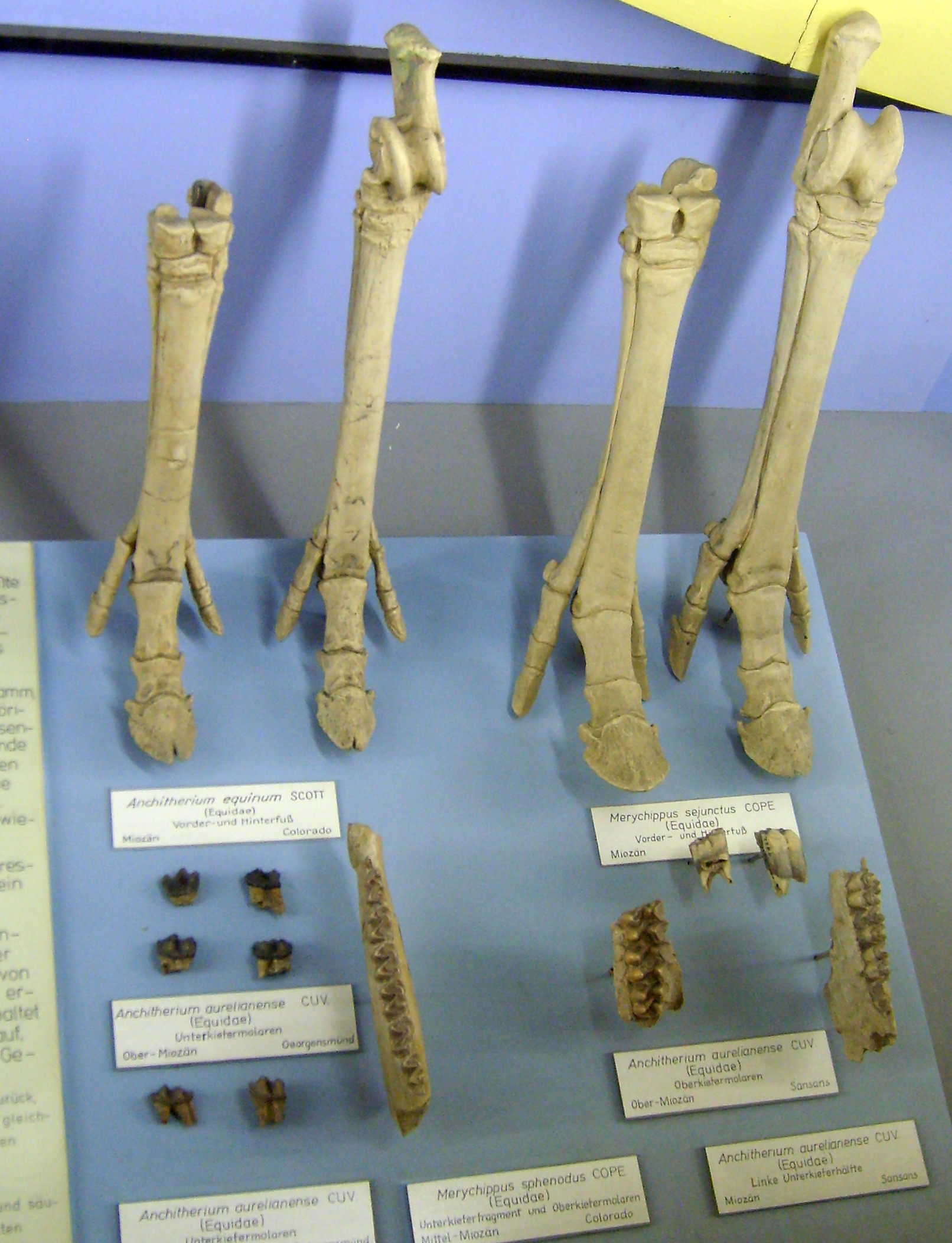
M. sejunctus front and back feet (right) and M. sphenodus lower jaw fragment

Merychippus lived in groups. It was about 100 cm (39 in) tall and at the time it was the tallest equine to have existed. Its muzzle was longer, its jaw deeper, and eyes wider apart than any other horse-like animal to date. The brain was also much larger, making it smarter and more agile. Merychippus was the first equine to have the distinctive head shape of today's horses.

The Miocene was a time of drastic change in environment, with woodlands transforming into grass plains. This led to evolutionary changes in the hooves and teeth of equids. A change in surface from soft, uneven mud to hard grasslands meant there was less need for increased surface area. The foot was fully supported by ligaments, and the middle toe developed into a hoof that did not have a pad on the bottom. In some Merychippus species, the side toes were larger, whereas in others, they were smaller and only touched the ground when running. The transformation into plains also meant Merychippus began consuming more phytolith rich plants. This led to the presence of hypsodont teeth. Such teeth range from medium to intense crown height, are curved, covered in large amounts of cement, and are characteristic of grazing animals Equid size also increased, with Merychippus ranging, on average, between 71 and 100.6 kg.

== Classification ==
The genus has been considered non-monophyletic as broadly defined, and including species of unrelated three toed equines. Merychippus gunteri and Merychippus primus are suggested to be early diverging members of Equinae. The type species, “Merychippus” insignis, as well as “M.” californicus, “M.” brevidontus , “M.” goorisi, “M.” republicanus, and “M.” coloradense are suggested to be members of the tribe Hipparionini, while “Merychippus” sejunctus has been suggested to be a member of the tribe Protohippini. Some former species of Merychippus have been assigned to the genera Acritohippus and Parapliohippus in Equini, as well as to Scaphohippus in Protoequini.
