= Tick Canyon Formation =

Geologic formation in California, United States

- Stratigraphic range: Early Miocene (Hemingfordian-Barstovian); ~20–16 Ma
- Type: Geologic formation
- Underlies: Mint Canyon Formation
- Overlies: Vasquez Formation
- Thickness: 0–1,000 ft (0–305 m) (average)

Lithology
- Primary: Sandstone, conglomerate
- Other: Claystone

Location
- Coordinates: 34°25′56″N 118°23′32″W
- Approximate paleocoordinates: 33.3°N 111.2°W
- Region: Los Angeles County, California
- Country: United States
- Extent: Sierra Pelona Ridge

Type section
- Named for: Tick Canyon
- Tick Canyon Formation (the United States) Tick Canyon Formation (California)

The Tick Canyon Formation (Tt) or Tick Canyon strata, is an Early Miocene geologic formation in the Sierra Pelona Ridge of the San Gabriel Mountains in Los Angeles County, California.

The Tick Canyon Basin drains into the Santa Clara River.

== Geology ==
The formation overlies the Oligocene to Lower Miocene Vasquez Formation, and underlies the Upper Miocene Mint Canyon Formation.

The Tick Canyon strata was deposited on land mostly by streams and consists of green sandstones, coarse-grained conglomerates, and red claystones. The Tick Canyon strata also contain abundant volcanic clasts, most of which resemble volcanic rocks of the Vasquez Formation. It has an average thickness of 600 feet (180 m).

North of the Tick Canyon Fault, the beds are almost vertical.

=== Fossil content ===
It preserves vertebrate fossils of the Lower Miocene subperiod of the Miocene epoch, in the Neogene Period of the Cenozoic Era.

=== Mammals ===
- Artiodactyls
  - Miolabis californicus
  - Merychyus calaminthus
  - M. minimus
- Perissodactyls
  - Parahippus maxsoni
  - Parahippus sp.
- Rodents
  - Archaeolagus acaricolus
  - Trogomys rupinimenthae

=== Birds ===
- Falconiformes
  - Miohierax stocki

== See also ==
- List of fossiliferous stratigraphic units in California
- Paleontology in California
- Goliad Formation
- Plush Ranch Formation
- Punchbowl Formation
- Shoal River Formation
