= Devil's Punchbowl (Angeles National Forest) =

Sandstone rock formation in the San Gabriel Mountains of Southern California

Coordinates: 34°24′34″N 117°50′48″W

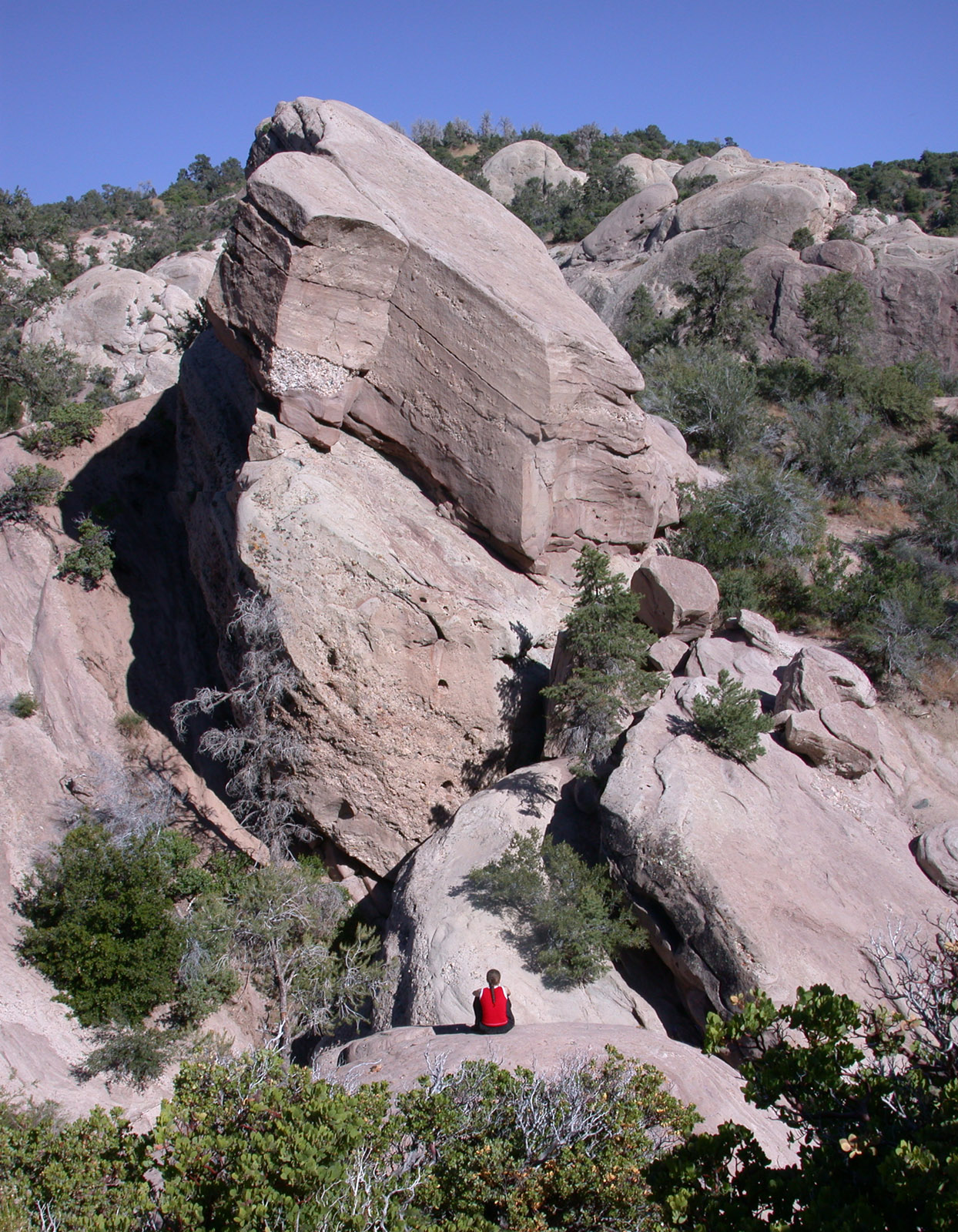
Part of the Punchbowl

Devil's Punchbowl is a tilted sandstone formation on the northern slopes of the San Gabriel Mountains, in Los Angeles County, California, at an elevation of 4,750 feet (1,450 m).

== Park ==
The Devils Punchbowl Natural Area is a Los Angeles County park, also within the San Gabriel Mountains National Monument and Angeles National Forest. It is located south of the Pearblossom Highway (CA Route 138), near the towns of Littlerock and Pearblossom.

The Devil's Punchbowl Nature Center is operated by the Los Angeles County Department of Parks and Recreation. The center focuses on the flora, fauna, and geological features of the park, and the center offers school programs, parties, guided park tours, as well as telescope programs with an 11-inch telescope. The Bobcat Fire burned through the park in September 2020, destroying the nature center. Since the park reopened after the fire, a temporary nature center is being utilized.

=== Trails ===
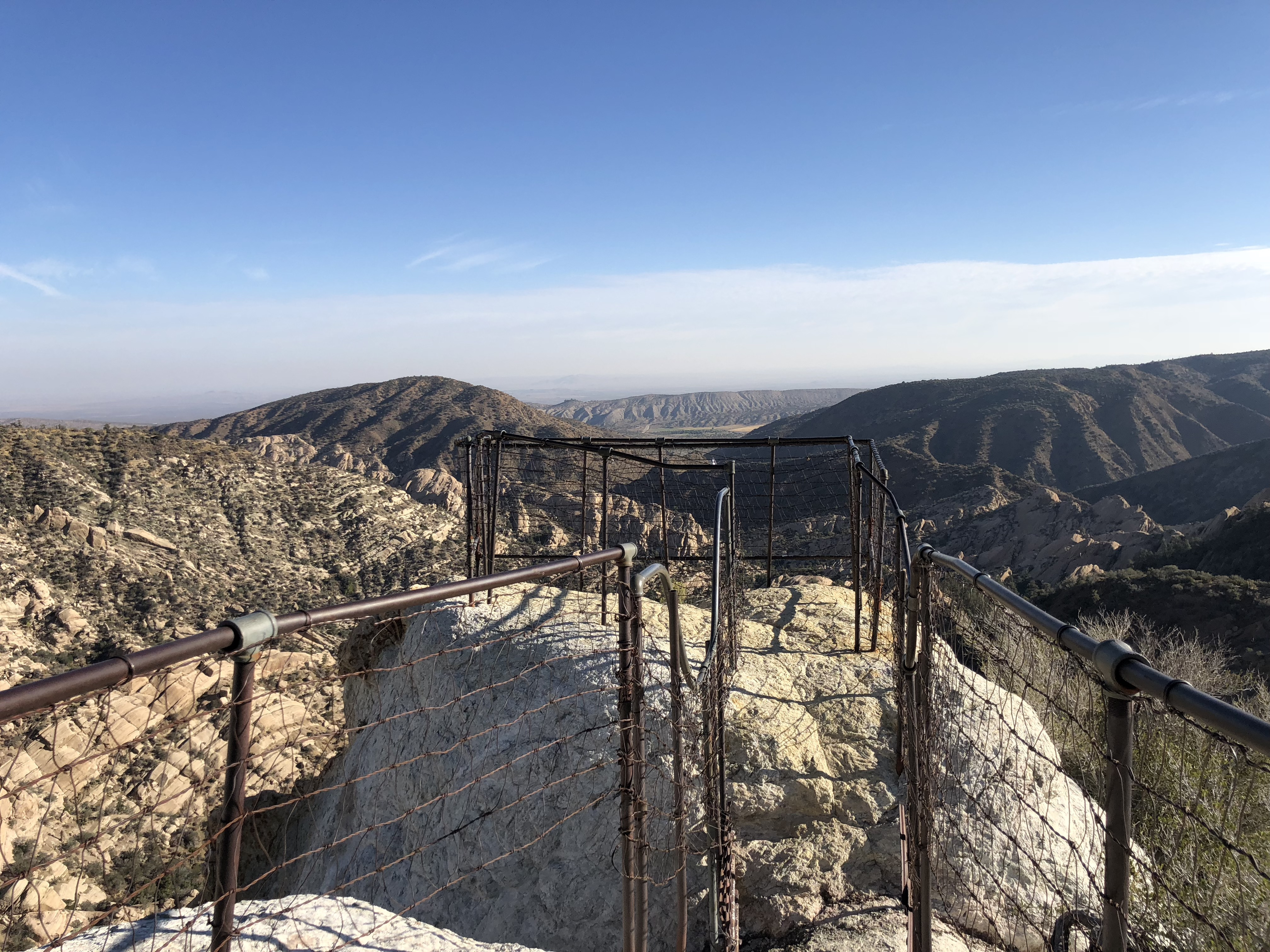
The Devil's Chair

The trails within the park showcase the geologic features along the Punchbowl Formation and San Andreas Fault. There are connections to major longer trails leading to the high country in the National Monument.

- Devil's Punchbowl Loop Trail is a 1-mile loop hike from the Nature Center that highlights important geological features.
- Burkhart Trail is a lightly trafficked 7.2 mile route leading to the Burkhart Saddle in the Pleasant View Ridge Wilderness, a 14.4 mile out and back hike that begins heading south- southwest, before turning slightly north and finally southernly from the park. The trail has been degraded since the Bobcat fire and has been reported as overgrown with Poodle Dog Bush, loose rock and difficult to follow.
- The Devil's Chair Hike is a 7.5 mile round-trip hike to a perched viewpoint in Devil's Punchbowl.

The Pacific Crest Trail also traverses the park on an endangered species detour to help protect the mountain yellow-legged frog.

== Geology ==
The primary attractions of the park are its geological formations, including the Punchbowl Formation of the Neogene period. The Punchbowl is a deep canyon categorized as a plunging syncline: a v-shaped folding of the earth's strata caused by compression. The mountain peaks above the park are 8,000 feet in elevation, compared to the park's Nature Center at 4,740 feet above sea level. The Punchbowl Canyon is 300 feet deep at the vista point.

The peculiar uptilted rock formations found in the area are layers of sedimentary rocks formed long ago by water depositing loose material in horizontal layers. Later they were squeezed into their present, steeply tilted form by ongoing uplift action along the Punchbowl and Pinyon Faults and by pressures along the San Andreas Fault. The Punchbowl Fault is to the south of the rock formation, while the Pinyon and San Andreas Faults are to the north.

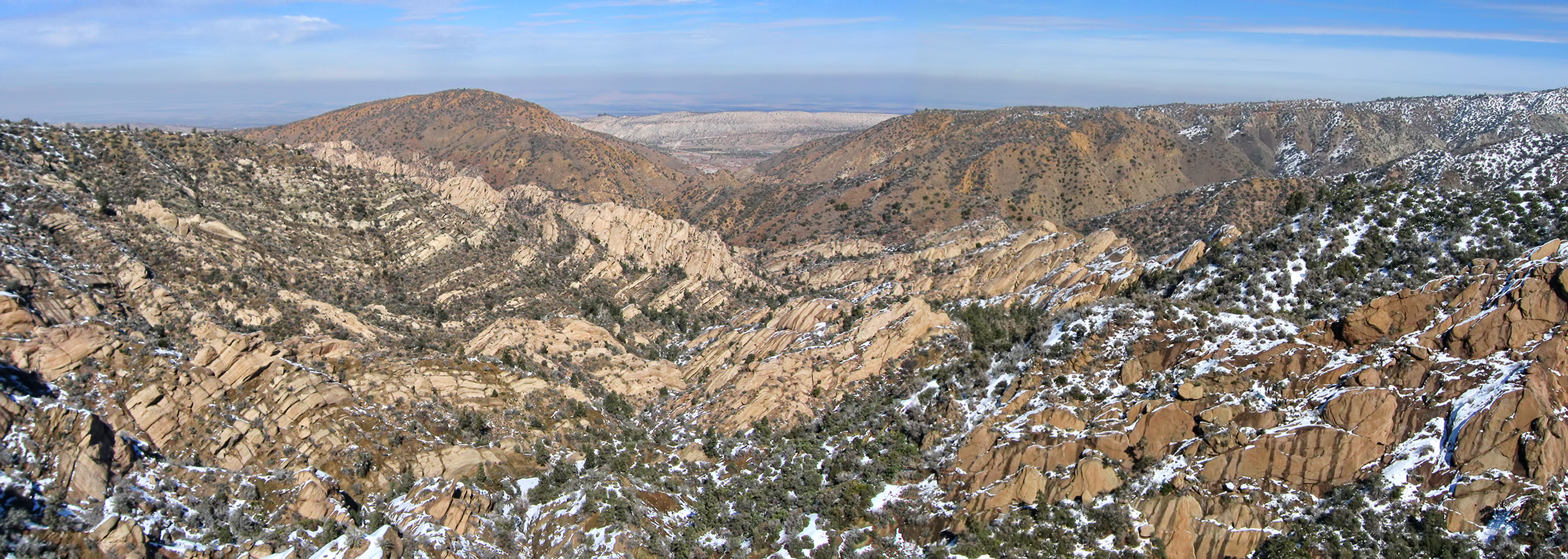
Panorama of the Devil's Punchbowl from the Devil's Chair.

== Flora ==
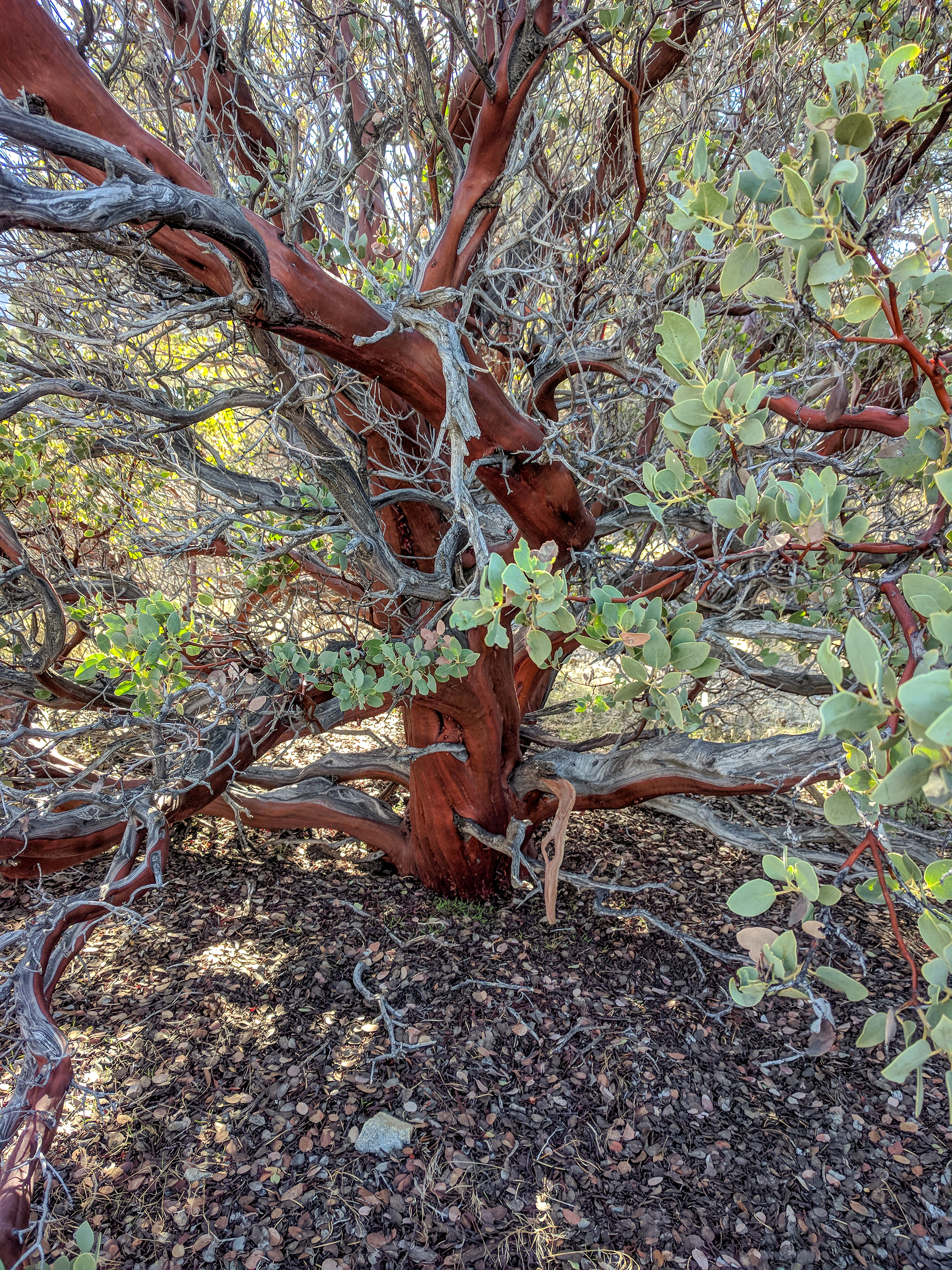
Manzanita, Devil's Punchbowl county park

Driving into the park, beginning on the flats of the Antelope Valley, there is almost a complete absence of large shrubs or trees. The road then climbs into a belt of Joshua trees and California junipers. Entering the park boundaries, the Joshuas are left behind and replaced by Pinyon pine Woodland, with shrubs of the Desert Chaparral as an understory. The streambeds, both Punchbowl Creek at the bottom of the bowl and other watercourses in the Antelope Valley, have their own type of vegetation with cottonwoods, willows, and other plants that require more water. The next plant community above the park is the Coulter Pines and Yellow Pine Forest of the higher San Gabriel Mountains. Above these trees, White Firs are silhouetted against the sky on the high slopes and peaks.

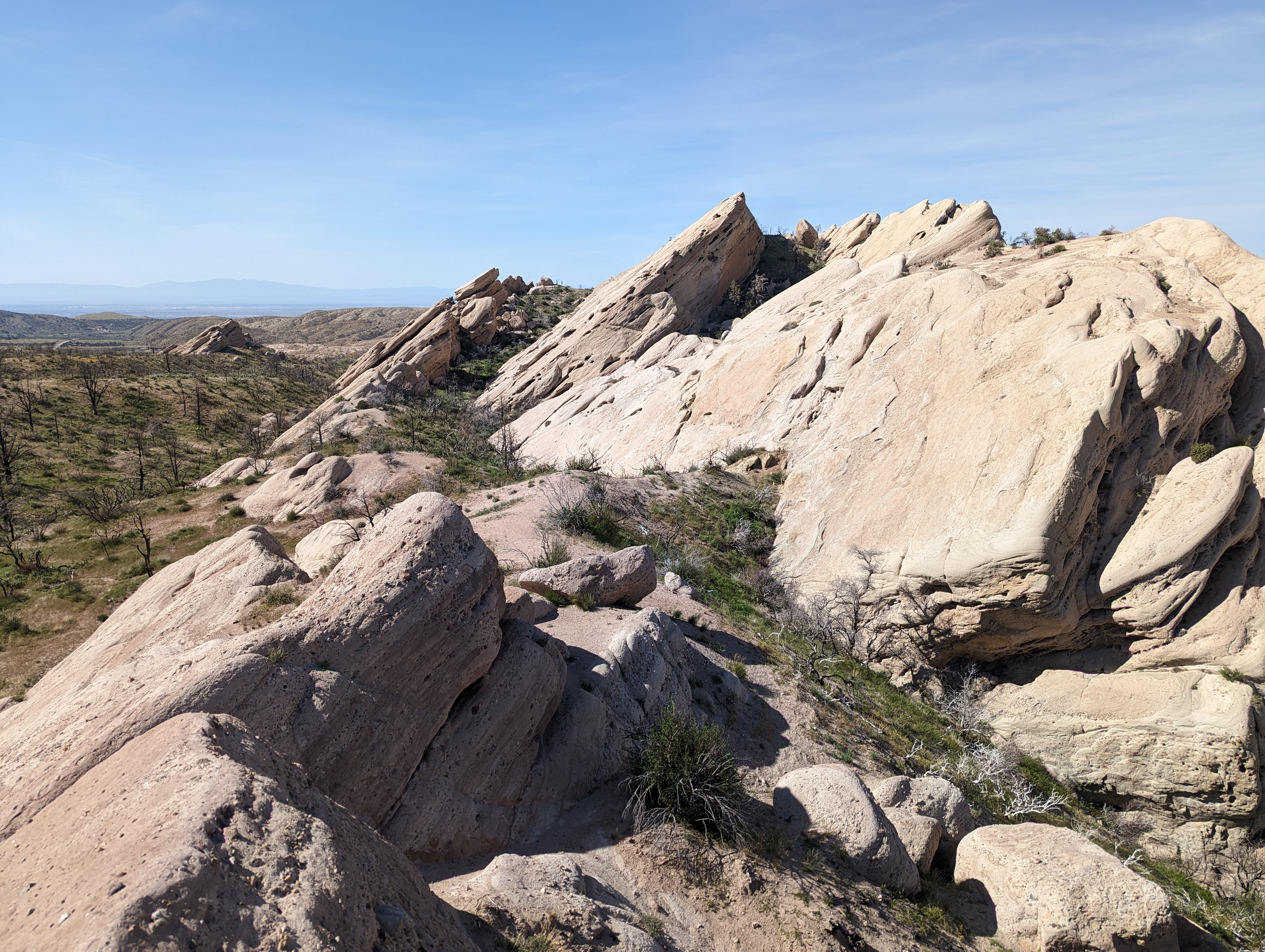
Rock formation in 2023, showing regrowth after the Bobcat Fire. (view as a 360° interactive panorama)

The park was heavily affected by the Bobcat Fire in 2020, and reopened to the public in 2022.

== Fauna ==
Many types of mammals live here but most are nocturnal and are seldom seen. Gray foxes may sometimes be seen in the early mornings or at dusk, and you may occasionally see deer crossing the road. Bighorn sheep, though rare, have been seen in the area, and chipmunks and California ground squirrels are active during most of the day. A few common birds are on display, and many additional species migrate through the area at various times of the year. The park's reptile and amphibian fauna represent a unique blend of types found in both deserts and mountains. Examples of some common local reptiles and amphibians are on display in the nature center on site. Rattlesnakes are also common but are wary of people and are rarely encountered. Insects and spiders are seasonally abundant. They may be seen on flowers and shrubs throughout the park, especially during the spring and summer. A representative collection of the various orders of insects is also on display.

== Filming location ==
The German heavy metal band Accept filmed a video for their song "Stampede" at the location.

== See also ==
- Punchbowl Formation — geologic formation
- San Gabriel Mountains National Monument−related topics
- Neogene geological period in California
