= Mount Lowe Intrusive Suite =

Mount Lowe intrusive series is a geologic formation occurring in the San Gabriel Mountains in southern California. It is composed of layered pluton exposed over a large area in western San Gabriel Mountains and northeastern Soledad Basin. The formation varies from hornblende diorite and quartz diorite in the lowest part to albite-rich granite and syenite in the upper part. Within the formation large phenocrysts of hornblende, orthoclase and garnet contribute to distinctive appearance.

The formation was first named by William J. Miller as "Mount Lowe Granodiorite" in 1934.
