= Antelope Valley Hospital =

Coordinates: 34.687851°N 118.157914°W

Antelope Valley Medical Center
- Antelope Valley Healthcare District

Geography
- Location: Lancaster, California, United States

Organization
- Care system: Private
- Type: Community
- Affiliated university: None

Services
- Emergency department: level II trauma center
- Beds: 420

History
- Opened: 1955

Links
- Website: http://www.avmc.org/
- Lists: Hospitals in California

Antelope Valley Medical Center (AVMC) is a district hospital located in Lancaster, California specializing in acute care. It has 420 beds and is accredited by the Joint Commission. In March 2010 AVMC was declared one of the 14 trauma centers in Los Angeles County.

== Hospital rating data ==
The HealthGrades website contains the latest quality data for Antelope Valley Medical Center, as of 2015. For this rating section three different types of data from HealthGrades are presented: quality ratings for 27 inpatient conditions and procedures, 13 patient safety indicators, percentage of patients giving the hospital a 9 or 10 (the two highest possible ratings).

For inpatient conditions and procedures, there are three possible ratings: worse than expected, as expected, better than expected. For Antelope Valley Medical Center the data for this category is:

- Worse than expected - 13
- As expected - 14
- Better than expected - 0

For patient safety indicators, there are the same three possible ratings. For this hospital four indicators were rated as:

- Worse than expected - 4
- As expected - 9
- Better than expected - 0

Data for patients giving this hospital a 9 or 10 are:

- Patients rating this hospital as a 9 or 10 - 57%
- Patients rating hospitals as a 9 or 10 nationally - 69%

== Stroke Program ==
Antelope Valley Medical Center currently has an Advanced Primary Stroke Center Certification by the American Heart Association. This designation signifies that AVH has the equipment, infrastructure, staff, and training programs needed to provide care based on the most current research and standards to foster better outcomes for patients who have had a stroke. To effectively treat the most common type of stroke ‑ ischemic stroke ‑ doctors must administer an intravenous clot‑dissolving medication within 4.5 hours from the onset of symptoms. AVMC consistently treats patients within the 60‑minute door‑to‑needle goal.
