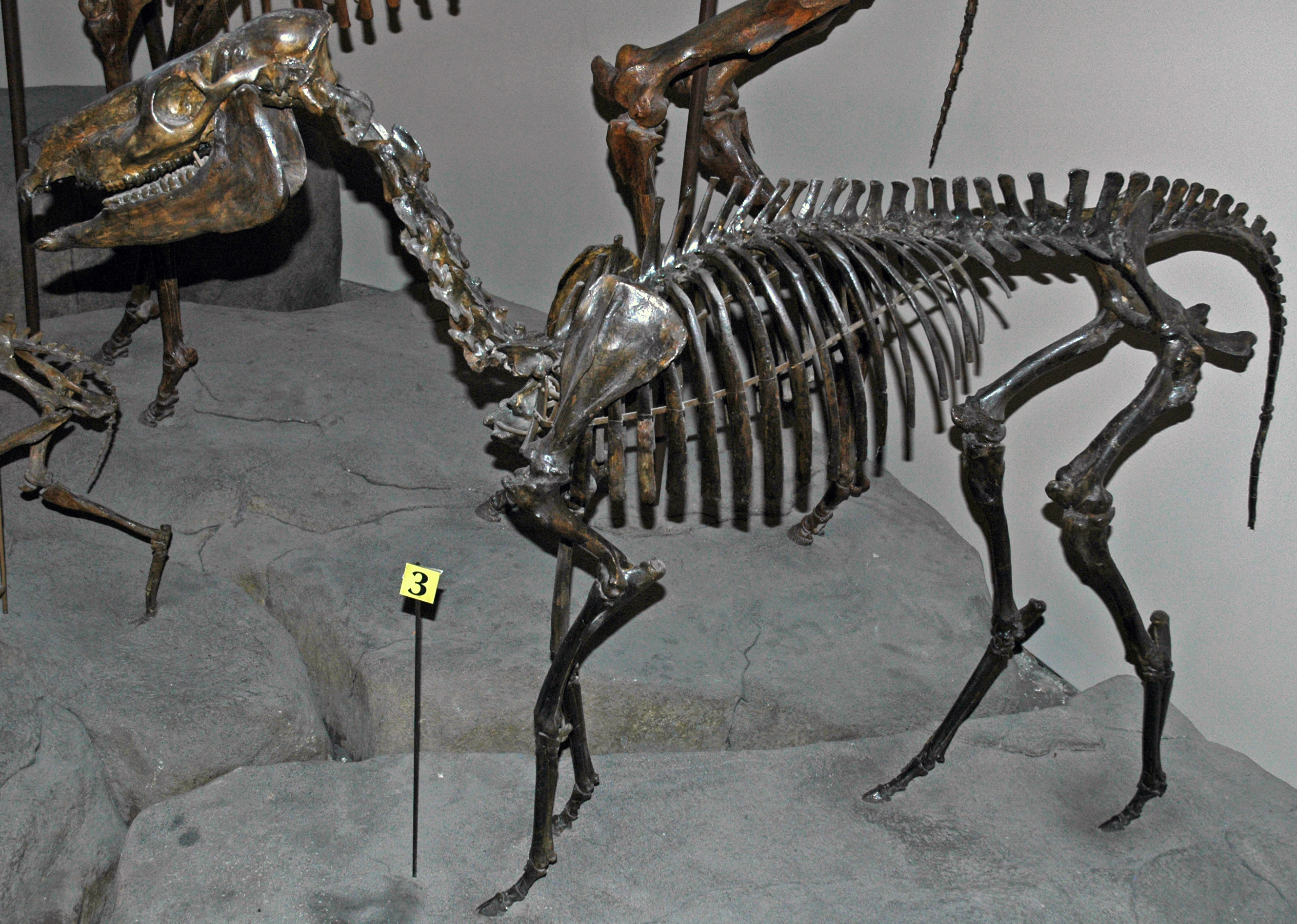
- A. isonesus skeleton

Scientific classification
- Kingdom: Animalia
- Phylum: Chordata
- Class: Mammalia
- Infraclass: Placentalia
- Order: Perissodactyla
- Family: Equidae
- Subfamily: Equinae
- Genus: †Acritohippus; Kelly, 1995

Species
- A. isonesus; A. quinni; A. stylodontus; A. tertius

= Acritohippus =

Acritohippus Temporal range: Miocene

Extinct genus of mammals

Acritohippus is an extinct genus of Miocene area equine from North America. Fossils of Acritohippus have been found in Florida, New Mexico, Montana, California, and Oregon, where its fossils were first unearthed and described as a species of Merychippus back in 1928. It was a grazer that ate C4 grasses.
