= Plush Ranch Formation =

Geologic formation in California, United States

- Stratigraphic range: Late Oligocene-Early Miocene (Arikareean); ~27–20.4 Ma
- Type: Formation
- Underlies: Caliente Formation (unconformably)
- Overlies: Basement (unconformably)

Lithology
- Primary: Conglomerate, sandstone, siltstone, shale
- Other: Limestone, evaporite, interbedded basalt

Location
- Coordinates: 34.8°N 119.1°W
- Approximate paleocoordinates: 33.8°N 113.6°W
- Region: California
- Country: United States
- Extent: Plush Ranch Basin, Transverse Ranges

Type section
- Named for: Plush Range
- Named by: Carman
- Year defined: 1954
- Plush Ranch Formation (the United States) Plush Ranch Formation (California)

The Plush Ranch Formation is a geologic formation in the Transverse Ranges of southern California. The formation preserves fossils dating back to the Late Oligocene to Early Miocene (Arikareean in the NALMA classification).

== Description ==
The formation is the oldest non-marine unit of the Tejon region where the small Plush Ranch Basin is formed by the bounding Big Pine/Lockwood Valley and San Andreas Faults. The unit is composed of alluvial and lacustrine conglomerates, sandstones, siltstones, shales, limestones, and evaporites. Interbedded basalt has been dated by whole-rock and plagioclase K-Ar methods as ca. 26–23 Ma. Northwest of Plush Ranch Basin, on the opposite side of Mount Pinos (which includes exposures of Pelona Schist), Oligocene–Miocene strata are generally mapped as Simmler Formation, but are considered equivalent to the Plush Ranch Formation. These strata coarsen upward, from mostly sandstone at the base to coarse conglomerate at the top.

The lacustrine deposits represent the central and eastern parts of the Plush Ranch basin, which received little coarse siliciclastic sediment. Chironomid flies, disarticulated fish, and coprolites indicate a more or less permanent lake.

Atop the Plush Ranch Formation, separated by an angular unconformity, there is the non-marine Caliente Formation, comprising fluvial and lacustrine conglomerate, sandstone, and mudstone, with minor tuffaceous and limestone beds.

== Fossil content ==
The following fossils have been reported from the formation:

Insects

- Blattodea
  - Stylotermitidae
    - Parastylotermes frazieri

== See also ==
- List of fossiliferous stratigraphic units in California
- Paleontology in California
- Diligencia Formation
- Tick Canyon Formation
