= Diligencia Formation =

Geologic formation in California, United States

- Stratigraphic range: Late Oligocene-Early Miocene (Arikareean); ~25–20.4 Ma
- Type: Formation
- Overlies: Proterozoic augen gneiss (basement); Maniobra Formation (in the north)
- Thickness: 1,500 m (4,900 ft)

Lithology
- Primary: Conglomerate, sandstone, siltstone, limestone
- Other: Interbedded basalt and andesite

Location
- Coordinates: 33.5°N 115.7°W
- Approximate paleocoordinates: 32.2°N 107.5°W
- Region: California
- Country: United States
- Extent: Orocopia Mountains

Type section
- Named by: Crowell
- Year defined: 1975
- Diligencia Formation (the United States) Diligencia Formation (California)

The Diligencia Formation (Td) is a geologic formation cropping out in the Orocopia Mountains in southern California. It preserves mammal fossils dating to the Late Oligocene to Early Miocene (Arikareean in the NALMA classification).

== Description ==
The non-marine Diligencia Formation, defined by Crowell in 1975, is composed of alluvial, fluvial, and lacustrine conglomerates, sandstones, siltstones and limestones. It contains interbedded basalt and andesite flows, dated by whole-rock and plagioclase K-Ar methods as ca. 24–21 Ma), and andesitic sills and dikes.

== Fossil content ==
The formation has provided the following fossils:

Mammals

- Artiodactyls
  - Merycoidodontidae
    - Merychyus cf. minimus

== See also ==
- List of fossiliferous stratigraphic units in California
- Paleontology in California
- Plush Ranch Formation
- Tick Canyon Formation
