= Fruitvale Oil Field =

Oil and gas field in the San Joaquin Valley, California, USA

Coordinates: 35.3969°N 119.0730°W

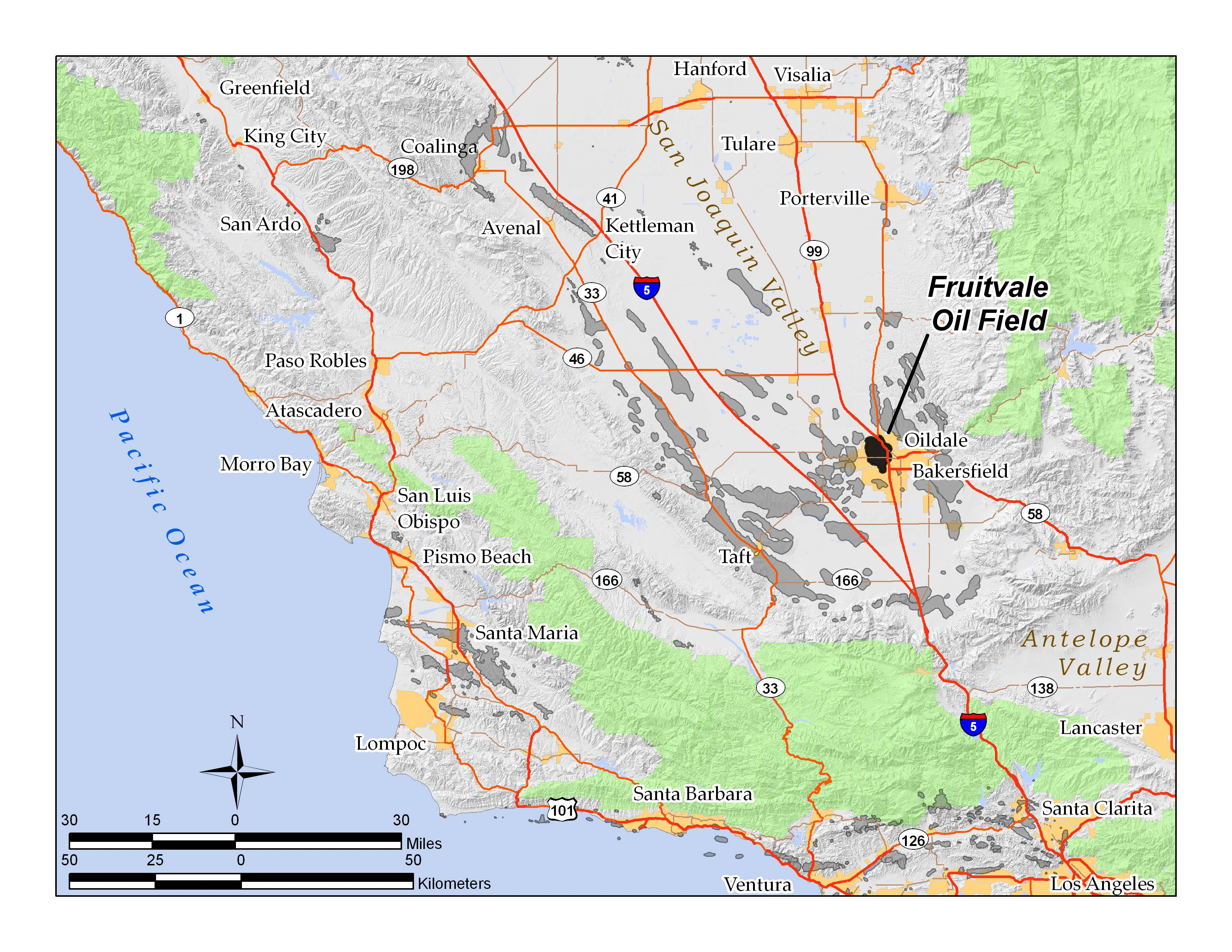
The Fruitvale Oil Field in Kern County, California. Other oil fields are shown in gray.

The Fruitvale Oil Field is a large oil and gas field in the southern San Joaquin Valley, California, within and just northwest of the city of Bakersfield, along and north of the Kern River. It is one of the few oil fields in the California Central Valley which is mostly surrounded by a heavily populated area. Discovered in 1928, and with a cumulative total recovery of more than 124 million barrels (19,700,000 m^{3}) of oil at the end of 2006, it is 41st in size among California oil fields, and according to the California Department of Oil, Gas, and Geothermal Resources (DOGGR) its total reserve amounts to a little less than ten percent of its original oil.

== Setting ==
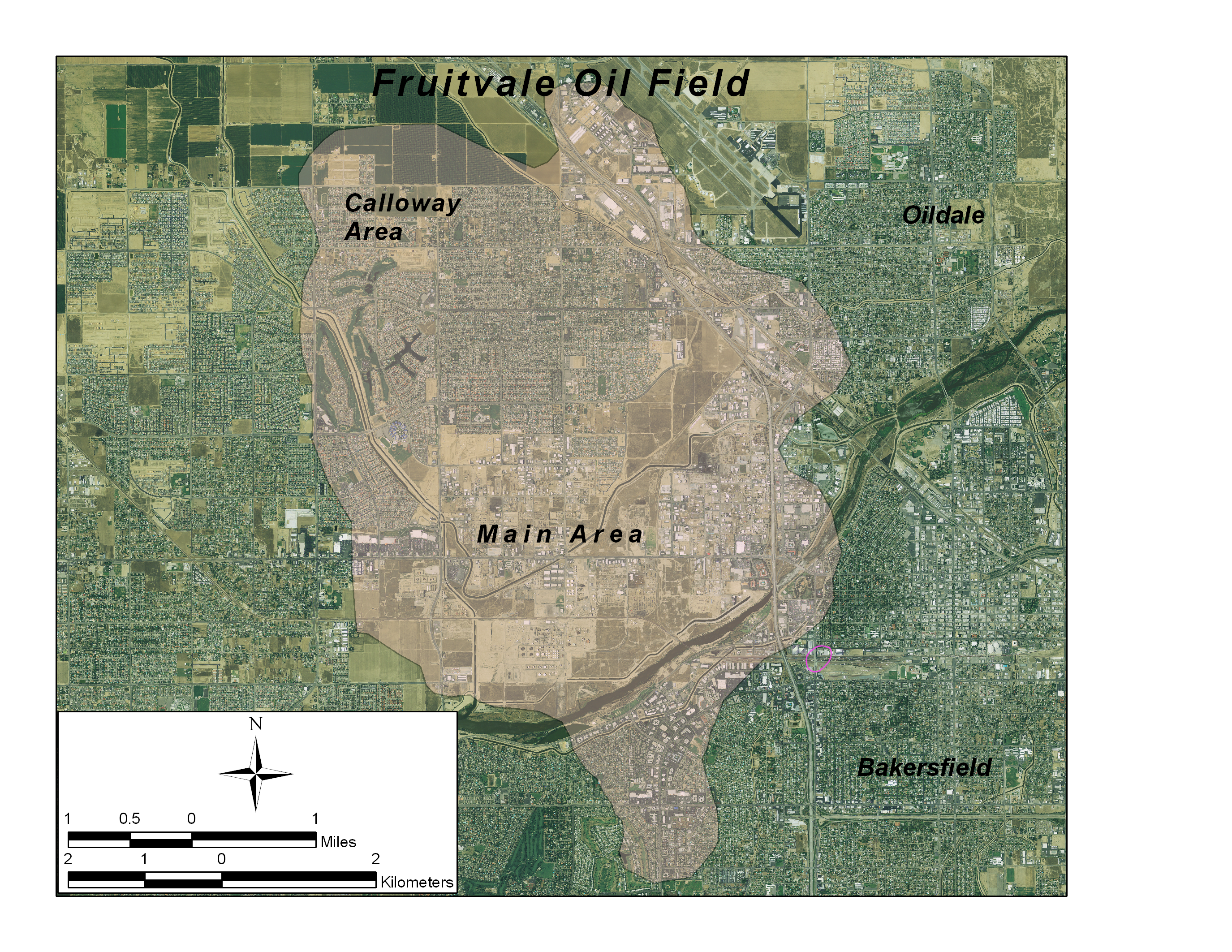
Aerial view of the Fruitvale field, with subareas labeled; the lighter colored area is the field itself, which is almost entirely surrounded by the city of Bakersfield.

Unlike most of the large Kern County oil fields, which are in the hills bordering the Central Valley, the Fruitvale field is on the valley floor, surrounded by the city of Bakersfield and its suburbs. The southern San Joaquin Valley in the vicinity of the oil field, except where cut by the Kern River and where artificially modified by features such as canals, is almost as flat as a table top, and the elevation of the field varies only from about 300 to 400 feet (91 to 122 meters) across its 3,970-acre (16.1 km^{2}) extent.

The climate is arid, with hot summers and mild winters. Temperature in the summer commonly exceeds 100 °F (38 °C). Only about 5 to 6 inches (150 mm) of precipitation falls in a year, almost invariably as rain, and in the winter. Tule fog is common during the cooler months. Drainage is to the Kern River which flows southwest through the southern part of the field towards the Buena Vista Lake Bed.

While the native vegetation in the area is mostly allscale and needlegrass, most vegetation has been removed from the area of active operations, and formerly active areas have largely been converted to industrial or other urban uses. Much of the northern part of the field, no longer used for production, is covered with residential development, as is the extreme south part, south of the Kern River. In the northwestern area of the field, the Calloway Area, a decommissioned part of the field has been turned into a golf course. Riparian vegetation and associated wildlife habitats can be found along the Kern River, which crosses through the southern part of the field.

Since the oil field is in an urbanized area, it is easily accessible from all sides. California State Route 99, a freeway, runs along and through the east side of the field, and the Rosedale Highway, Route 58 runs across it from east to west. Calloway Drive runs approximately along the western boundary, and Coffee Road parallels Calloway Drive to the east, crossing through the entire field.

== Geology ==
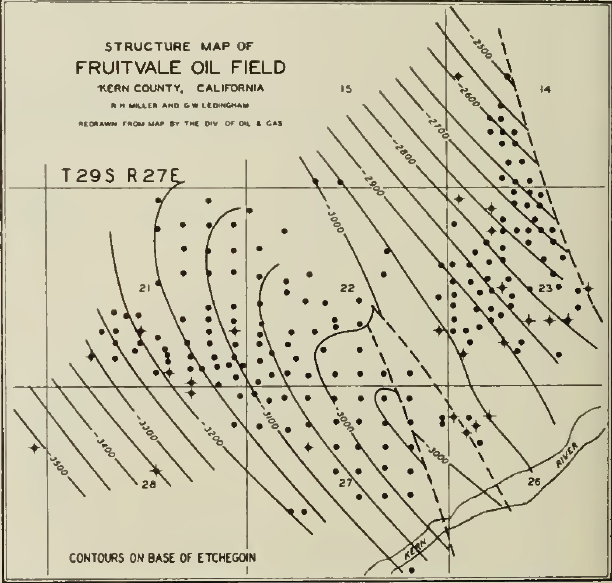
Fruitvale Oil Field Structure Map

The Fruitvale Field is in a sedimentary basin in which the beds dip slightly to the west. The topmost sedimentary unit, the Kern River Formation, is young – of Pleistocene age – and not oil-bearing. Underneath this alluvial layer, which is over 3,000 feet (910 m) thick, and over millions of years, oil has collected in a series of structural traps, typically where an oil-bearing unit is topped by an impermeable one, and blocked up-dip by another impermeable structure placed there by faulting. The most productive geologic formations, from top to bottom, include the Pliocene Etchegoin Formation, Pliocene-Miocene Chanac Formation, the Miocene 42-O Sand, and the Miocene Santa Margarita Formation. Many of these formations are productive oil-bearing units elsewhere in the Central Valley, for their geographic coverage is wide, and many structural and stratigraphic trap types exist throughout the province.

The field is divided conventionally into two significant areas: the large Main Area on the east and south, and the much smaller Calloway Area on the northwest. At the west edge of the field is the small and abandoned Greenacres Area, which was marginally productive, between 1953 and 1969.

A total of five oil pools are distinguished within the Main Area. In order of discovery, they are the Mason-Parker, Martin, and Kernco (all February 1928), Santa Margarita (December 1929), and Fairhaven (March 1936). Oil is found at depths ranging from 3,000 to 4,000 feet (910 to 1,220 m). In the Calloway Area, two pools are identified but production data is commingled; they are named for their petroleum-bearing unit, the 42-0/42-7 Sand. This area was not discovered until 1957.

Signal Oil & Gas. drilled the deepest well in the field, reaching a depth of 11,577 feet (3,529 m), and encountering the granitic basement rocks, probably of Jurassic age.

== History, production and operations ==
The first well drilled in the area to find oil was by Pacific Eastern Production Company (later Gulf Oil) which reached oil in February 1928, and attained a total initial depth of 3,849 feet (1,173 m). A few months after completion, the same well was recompleted to a depth of 6,191 feet (1,887 m); however, nothing significantly more productive was found at this depth.

Several enhanced recovery techniques have been used in the Fruitvale Field. In 1972, operators began waterflooding, thereby attempting to push the heavy crude to production wells, increasing the rate of extraction; in 1976, they began using cyclic steam flooding, a generally more effective technique for heavy oil, as the heat considerably reduces the oil's viscosity, helping it to flow. Fireflooding, an enhanced recovery technology in which flammable units deep underground are ignited—in this case, a 15-foot (4.6 m) thick section of oil sand—began in 1980 in the portion of the field operated by Gulf. Engineers at the time believed that up to 400 million further barrels of oil could be recovered from the field, oil which could be made to flow due to the intense heat generated by this process.

In 2008, well operators on the field included none of the major oil companies. The largest operators were independents such as Summit Energy, Big West of California, San Joaquin Facilities Management, E & B Natural Resources, Sunray Petroleum, Black Gold Oil Co., and others. A total of 301 wells remained in production, and 65 were used for injection of various kinds (including steam and wastewater).

The most productive year for the field as a whole was 1954, during which 3,587,093 barrels (570,302.2 m^{3}) were extracted. Production has generally declined since, although it leveled off around 1986, with approximately 400,000 to 450,000 barrels (64,000 to 72,000 m^{3}) pumped each year since then.
