= Buena Vista Oil Field =

Coordinates: 35.1865°N 119.4304°W

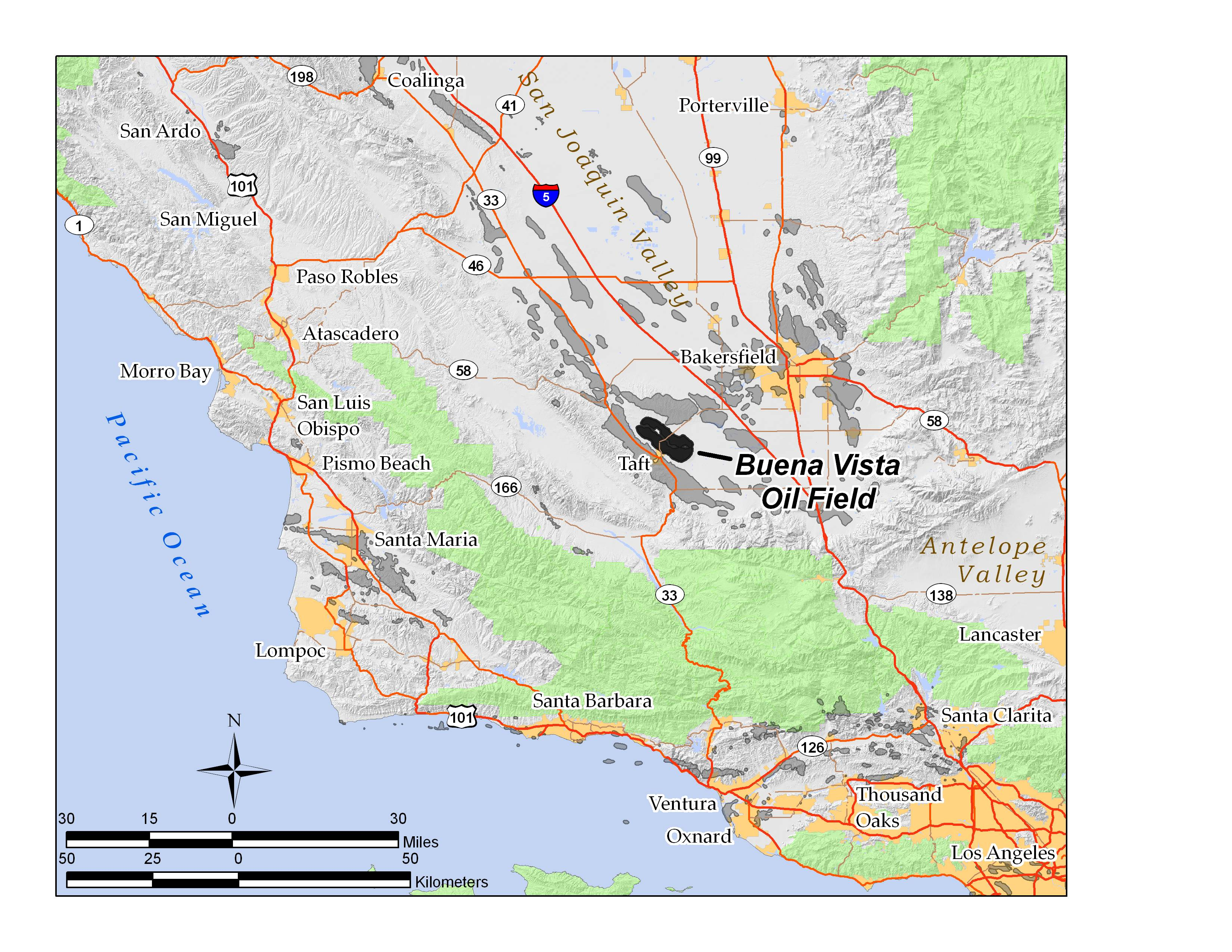
The Buena Vista Oil Field in Southern and Central California. Other oil fields are shown in gray.

The Buena Vista Oil Field, formerly the Naval Petroleum Reserve No. 2 (NPR-2) is a large oil field in Kern County, San Joaquin Valley, California in the United States. Discovered in 1909, and having a cumulative production of approximately 686 million barrels (109,100,000 m^{3}), it is the tenth-largest oil field in California as of 2024. Its annual production has remained constant for the past decade around 1,250,000 barrels (199,000 m^{3}) after being revitalized in the late 2000s. Part of this revitalization involved Crimson Resources initiating a waterflood in the Etchegoin Formation. They saw good response and sold the asset to Occidental Petroleum (now California Resources Corporation, CRC). CRC continued the development of the waterflood, but also tested the viability of the Monterey Formation. The Monterey Formation at Buena Vista has proven to be a viable target and is currently being developed.

== Setting ==
The oil field is in two parts, the Buena Vista Hills Area and the Buena Vista Front Area, both roughly linear features about 12 miles (19 km) long, running parallel about 2 miles (3.2 km) apart, and each being 1 to 2 miles (1.6 to 3.2 km) across, and trending from southeast to northwest. The town of Taft is adjacent to the southwest, about halfway along the field. The oil field underlies the Buena Vista Hills, a low range with a maximum elevation of 1,300 feet (400 m), in their entirety, and the Buena Vista Front Area is mostly in the Buena Vista Valley, which separates the Buena Vista Hills from the larger Elk Hills range to the north. State Route 33 parallels the Buena Vista Field about 2 miles (3.2 km) to the southwest, and State Route 119 cuts across the field to the northeast, towards Bakersfield.

Many oil fields underlie the southwestern portion of Kern County. Adjacent to the Buena Vista field to the southwest is the enormous Midway-Sunset Oil Field, the largest in California and third-largest in the United States, and just north of the Buena Vista field is the Elk Hills Oil Field, famous for the Teapot Dome scandal as one of the illicit leases that brought corruption charges upon the administration of Warren G. Harding.

Until January 1, 1958, the Buena Vista field was considered to be part of the larger Midway-Sunset Field to the southwest; now, however, the two are considered to be geologically separate.

== Geology and production ==
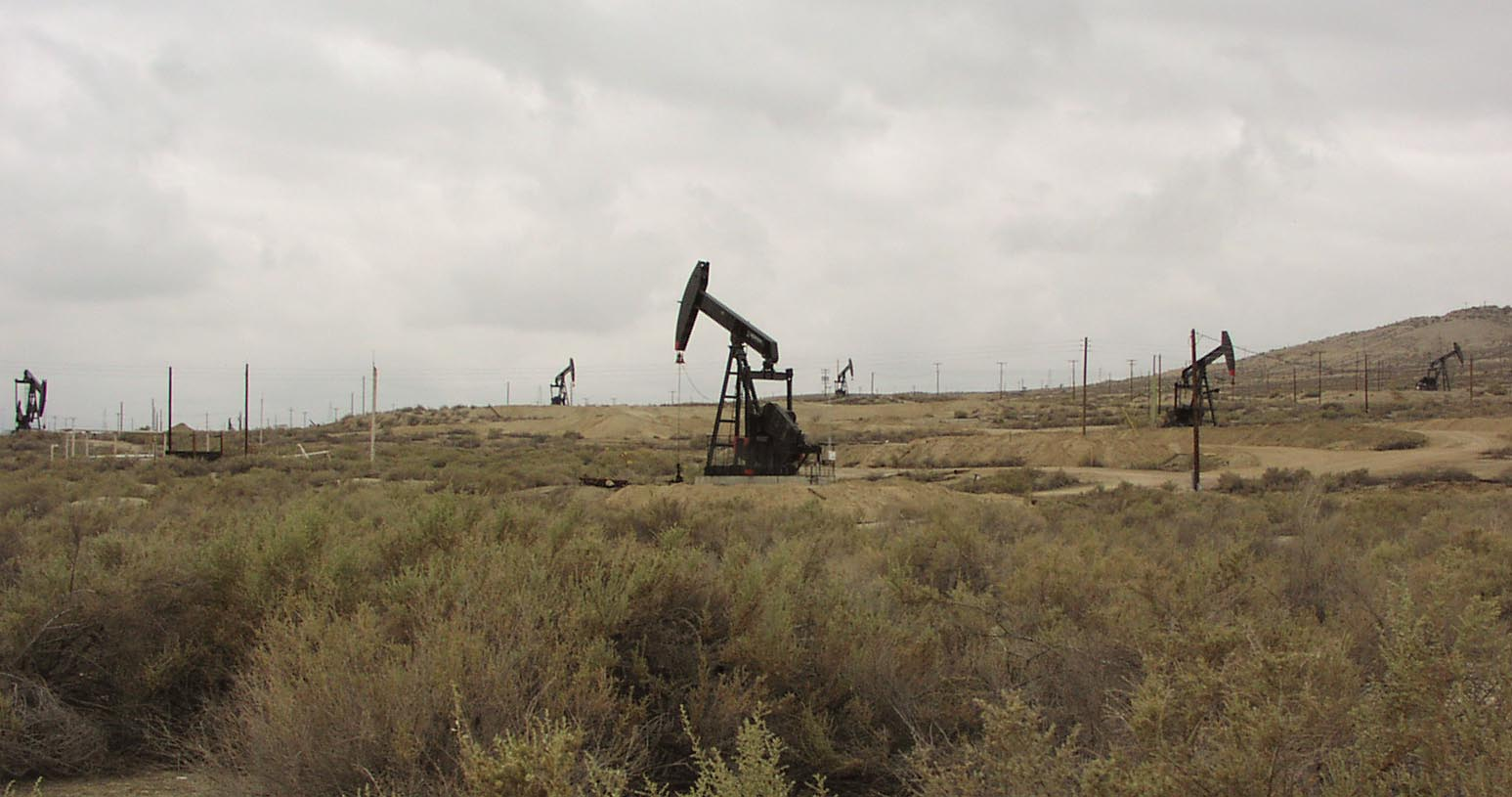
A few of the remaining active oil wells on the Buena Vista Field

As with many of the fields in the San Joaquin Valley, the Buena Vista field is predominantly an anticline, with pools of oil trapped in rock units beneath impermeable layers. Some of the oil pools are in domes and anticlinal formations, and others are trapped in rock units due to movement of faults. The age of most of the rock units containing oil varies from Pliocene (Etchegoin Formation), the most recent, to Miocene (Monterey and Santa Margarita Formations), the most ancient, and oil has been recovered at depths from about 2,300 feet (700 m) to 5,300 feet (1,600 m). The deepest well on the field was drilled by the Honolulu Oil Corp. to a depth of 14,622 feet (4,457 m), reaching the Santos unit of Oligocene age. No economically recoverable oil was found at this depth.

In the Front Area, the less productive part of the oil field, most of the oil comes from depths of around 4,000 feet (1,200 m), from the San Joaquin and Etchegoin formations. These pools were discovered in 1912, peak production was in 1925, waterflooding was attempted in the 1960s, and with most of the oil having been removed, today most operations have ceased. The Main Area of the Buena Vista Oil Field is still active, with enhanced recovery technologies such as gas injection still continuing. Peak production in the Main Area was in 1947, and has fallen off steadily since.

Most of the oil produced from the Buena Vista field is medium crude, with specific gravity of approximately 18 to 36 API. One of the geologic units, the "Mya Gas", discovered in 1909, produces only natural gas; its year of peak production was 1919. The discovery well for the field was in this unit, and it was the abundant presence of natural gas that convinced drillers to keep looking, as where gas was found, typically oil would be as well.

While much of the field has been abandoned, there is at least one active prospect adjacent to the old field. An Australian company, Salinas Energy, is currently studying the possibility of commencing production.

== California Historical Landmark ==
Buena Vista Refinery
- Location: corner of Hwy 33 and LoKern Rd., 10 miles N of McKittrick, California

California Historical Landmark
- Official name: Buena Vista Refinery
- Designated: July 31, 1953
- Reference no.: 504

Buena Vista Refinery California Historical Landmark reads:

NO. 504 BUENA VISTA REFINERY - Eight miles due west of this marker stood one of California's first commercial oil refineries. Between August 1864 and April 1867, approximately 4,000 gallons of illuminating oil produced there was shipped to San Francisco by the Buena Vista Petroleum Company. Refining operations terminated due to excessive transportation rates.

== See also ==
- California Historical Landmarks in Kern County
- California Historical Landmark
