= Semitropic Oil Field =

Oil and gas field in Kern County

Coordinates: 35.5808°N 119.4890°W

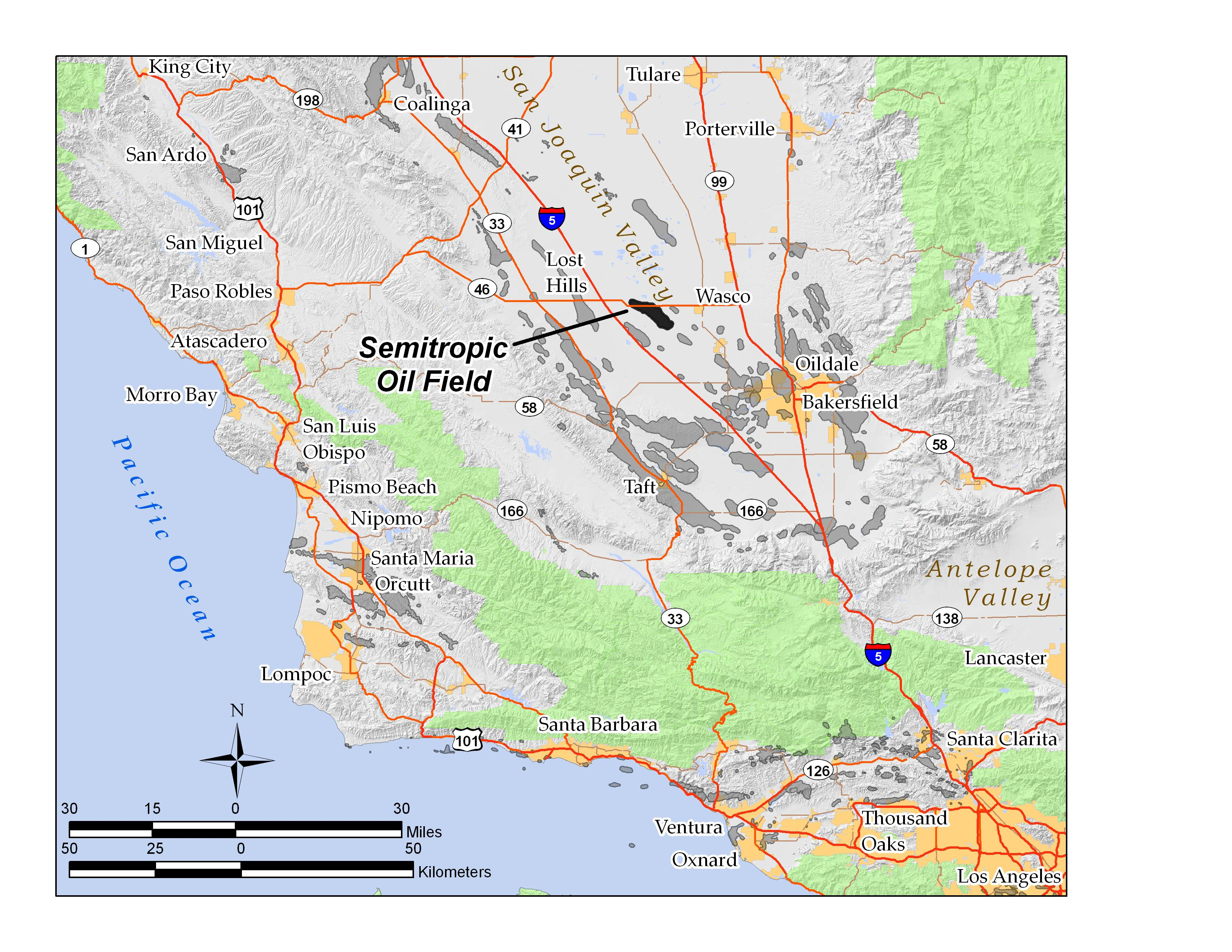
- The Semitropic Oil Field in central California. Other oil fields are shown in dark gray.
- Country: United States
- Region: San Joaquin Valley
- Location: Kern County, California
- Offshore/onshore: onshore
- Operator: Vintage Production

Field history
- Discovery: 1935
- Start of development: 1935
- Start of production: 1935
- Peak year: 1981

Production
- Current production of oil: 88.14 barrels per day (~4,392 t/a)
- Year of current production of oil: 2009
- Estimated oil in place: 0.216 million barrels (~29,500 t)
- Producing formations: San Joaquin Clay (Pliocene), Etchegoin Formation (Pliocene), Vedder Sands (Oligocene)

The Semitropic Oil Field is an oil and gas field in northwestern Kern County in California in the United States, within the San Joaquin Valley. Formerly known as the Semitropic Gas Field, it was discovered by the Standard Oil Company of California in 1935, and first understood to be primarily a natural gas reservoir; however, in 1956 a much deeper oil-bearing zone was discovered. The field contains the deepest oil well ever drilled in California, at 18,876 feet (5,753 m). At the end of 2008 the field still had 56 active oil wells, most of which were owned by Occidental Petroleum, and the field had an estimated 343,000 barrels of oil still recoverable with current technology.

== Setting ==
The Semitropic field is one of the oil and gas fields in the southern San Joaquin Valley which is underneath the bottomlands of the valley, rather than in the hills which surround it. Most of the largest fields are in the lower parts of the foothills to the mountains on either side of the valley, including monstrous reservoirs such as the Kern River and Midway-Sunset fields; in the bottomlands, the fields are more deeply buried and harder to find, as they have no surface geological expression, such as a line of hills indicating an anticlinal structure hiding an oil reservoir. Like many of the fields on the west side of the valley, it is an elongate dome aligned from northwest to southeast. The field is about seven miles (11 km) long by two across, at the widest point, and has a productive area of 4,430 acres (17.9 km^{2}).

The field parallels Interstate 5 about five miles (8.0 km) to the northeast. California State Route 46, the Paso Robles Highway, cuts across the northern extremity of the field from east to west, about 12 miles (19 km) east of Lost Hills. The town of Wasco is about eight miles (13 km) farther east along the same route. Several small abandoned oil and gas fields adjoin the Semitropic field from the southeast to the southwest, and the small Wasco Oil Field (with only three wells remaining active) is immediately adjacent to the east. The nearest large and still active oil field is the Lost Hills field, about 13 miles (21 km) to the west-northwest.

Terrain in the vicinity of the oil field is almost table-flat, with elevations ranging from approximately 250 to 280 feet (85 m) above sea level throughout the productive region, with a very slight gradient from south to north towards the Tulare Lake bed. The Semitropic Ridge, a gentle topographic prominence with a mean elevation of about twenty feet above the oil field, parallels the field to the southwest, separating it from Interstate 5. Climate is typical of the valley bottom in the south, which is arid. Temperatures in the summer routinely exceed 100 °F (38 °C) on typically cloudless days. Rain falls mainly in the winter months, and averages 5 to 6 inches (150 mm). Freezes occur occasionally during the winter, and the winter months are also subject to frequent dense tule fogs, limiting visibility to near zero. Drainage from the field in generally into the irrigation canal system, but because of the flat surface gradient most rainfall soaks directly into the ground.

Land use in the vicinity of the field is predominantly agricultural, with oil and gas production, storage, and transportation infrastructure interspersed with orchards and row crops. Little native vegetation remains as all the land has been converted to agricultural use. Roads cross the region at right angles, following township, range, and section lines, as do irrigation canals.

== Geology ==
The Semitropic field resembles the other three natural gas reservoirs in the southern San Joaquin Valley – the Buttonwillow, Trico, and Paloma gas fields – in being a northwest-to-southeast trending ellipsoidal dome, with the topmost unit containing commercial quantities of gas within a geologic formation known as the San Joaquin Clay. None of this geologic structure is visible on the ground surface since the Central Valley is wide and flat, but enough wells had been drilled in the general vicinity to give early prospectors the idea that a petroleum reservoir might be nearby.

Underneath several hundred feet of Holocene-age alluvium, deposited by thousands of years of runoff from the mountains that ring the Central Valley, is the Pleistocene Tulare Formation, which forms an impermeable cap to the underlying San Joaquin Clay, the principal gas-bearing unit. This unit varies in thickness from 2,200 to 4,400 feet (1,300 m), and has an average porosity of 28%. Drillers of early boreholes had determined that deeper formations contained oil, but since it never flowed, those prospectors guessed that the permeability of the units was insufficient for the field ever to be commercially viable. Wells drilled in 1956 and subsequent years, however, proved this wrong. Underneath the San Joaquin Clay is the Etchegoin Formation, which contains the Randolph Pool, a unit which turned out to be moderately productive. Its average depth is 7,400 feet (2,300 m) and the oil-bearing, highly porous subunit has a thickness of about 100 feet (30 m). Beneath this unit are several other rock units with no oil, including 4,000 feet (1,200 m) of the Monterey Formation; but underneath several other rock layers yet another oil pool was found in the Oligocene-age Vedder Sands, at a depth of 17,610 feet (5,370 m). This unit produced from only a single well, from 1975 until it was abandoned in 1977, and was the deepest oil-producing unit ever exploited in California. Oil from this depth was light, with an API gravity of 42, and came up with a temperature of 300 °F (149 °C), along with a reservoir pressure of 8,200 psi.

== History, production, and operations ==
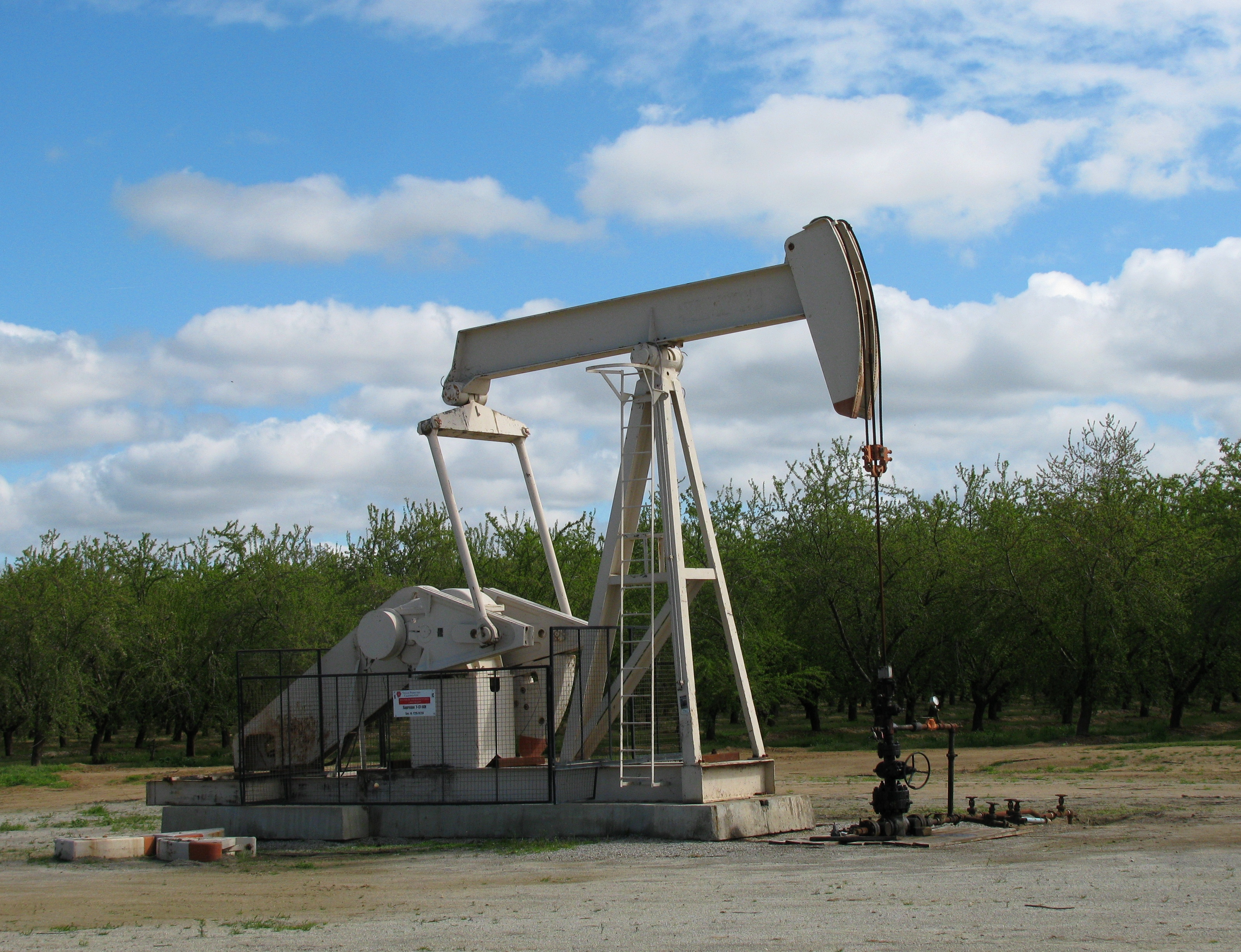
Active oil well on the Semitropic field, surrounded by orchards

Richfield Oil Company, ancestor of ARCO and then part of BP, drilled the first well into the field in 1929, but the well was poorly placed and failed to find a commercially viable gas or oil zone. Several other firms tried the area, with mixed luck: Shell Oil drilled a well all the way to 9,700 feet (3,000 m), but both oil and gas failed to produce, though they showed in drill cuttings; Fullerton Oil drilled seven separate holes, one of which blew out ten million cubic feet of gas per day, but then stuck shut, and had to be abandoned. In 1935, Standard Oil Company of California finally was able to complete a gas well which was self-sustaining at 3,193 feet, and was therefore considered the discovery well for the field.

Peak gas production for the field was in 1942, and peak oil was in 1981. The field changed ownership several times in its history. Recent operators have included Pacific Energy Resources and Occidental Petroleum. Pacific Energy sold the field – which amounted to 75 wells – in October 2008 to Vintage Production, a subsidiary of Occidental. Vintage still runs the field as of early 2010.
