= Dove Spring Formation =

Geologic formation in the Mojave Desert, California, U.S.

- Stratigraphic range: Miocene; ~13.5–7.3 Ma
- Type: Geological formation
- Unit of: Ricardo Group
- Overlies: Cudahy Camp Formation
- Thickness: 1,800 meters

Location
- Region: California
- Country: United States

The Dove Spring Formation (formerly the Ricardo Formation) is a geologic formation in the western Mojave Desert of California. It preserves fossils dating back to the Miocene epoch of the Neogene period.

== Fossil content ==
Color key: Taxon / Reclassified taxon / Taxon falsely reported as present / Dubious taxon or junior synonym / Ichnotaxon / Ootaxon / Morphotaxon

Notes
Uncertain or tentative taxa are in small text
~~crossed out~~ taxa are discredited.

=== Mammals ===
==== Bats ====
Bats reported from the Dove Spring Formation
Genus	Species	Presence	Material	Notes	Images
Chiroptera	Gen. et. sp. undetermined	Kern County, California.		A bat.	

==== Carnivorans ====
Carnivorans reported from the Dove Spring Formation
Genus	Species	Presence	Material	Notes	Images
Barbourofelis	B. osborni	Kern County, California.		Junior synonym of B. whitfordi.	
Barbourofelis	B. whitfordi	Red Canyon & other localities, Kern County, California.	Teeth & mandible.	A barbourofelid.	
Barbourofelis	B. sp.	LACM localities 6260 & 1108, Kern County, California.	Left partial humerus (LACM 140853) & left distal humerus (LACM 59336).	A barbourofelid also found in the Green Valley Formation.	
Bassariscus	B. sp.	Kern County, California.		A procyonid.	
Borophagus	B. littoralis	Red Rock Canyon, Kern County, California.	Left maxillary (LACM 143520).	A borophagine dog also found in the Green Valley, Santa Margarita & Chanac formations.	
Carpocyon	C. robustus	Kern County, California.	Partial skeleton (UCMP 33569).	A borophagine dog.	
cf. Eomellivora	cf. E. sp.	Kern County, California.		A large mustelid similar to the honey badger.	
Epicyon	E. aphobus	Kern County, California.		Junior synonym of E. haydeni.	
Epicyon	E. haydeni	Ricardo Fauna, Kern County, California.	Skull elements.	A borophagine dog.	
Epicyon	E. saevus	Ricardo Fauna, Kern County, California.	Ramal elements.	A borophagine dog.	
"Felis"	"F." sp.	Kern County, California.		A small felid.	
Ischyrocyon	I. gidleyi	Last Chance Gulch, Kern County, California.		A bear-dog.	
Ischyrocyon	I. mohavensis	Kern County, California.		Junior synonym of I. gidleyi.	
Leptocyon	L. vafer	Kern County, California (lower & upper parts of the formation).	Skull elements.	A canine dog.	
Martinogale	M. faulli	Red Rock Canyon, Kern County, California.	A nearly-complete skull (LACM 56230).	A skunk.	
Martinogale	M. sp.	Kern County, California.		A skunk.	
"Mephitis"	"M." sp.	Kern County, California.		A skunk.	
Metalopex	M. macconnelli	Red Rock Canyon, Kern County, California.	Skull elements.	A fox also found in the Milk Creek Formation & Malheur County, Oregon.	
Mustela	?M. buwaldi	Kern County, California.		A weasel.	
Osteoborus	O. diabloensis	Kern County, California.		Junior synonym of Borophagus littoralis.	
Pseudaelurus	P. sp.	Kern County, California.		A felid.	
Tomarctus	T. robustus	Kern County, California.		Moved to the genus Carpocyon.	
Tomarctus	T. sp.	Kern County, California.		A borophagine dog.	
"Vulpes"	"V." sp.	Kern County, California.		A fox.	

==== Eulipotyphlans ====
Eulipotyphlans reported from the Dove Spring Formation
Genus	Species	Presence	Material	Notes	Images
Alluvisorex	A. chasseae	Kern County, California.		A shrew.	
Erinaceidae	Erinaceidae "A"	Kern County, California.		An erinaceid.	
Lanthanotherium	L. sp.	Kern County, California.		An erinaceid.	
Limnoecus	L. sp.	Kern County, California.		A shrew.	
Scapanus	S. (Xeroscapheus) shultzi	Kern County, California.		A mole.	
"Sorex"	"S." sp.	Kern County, California.		A shrew.	

==== Lagomorphs ====
Lagomorphs reported from the Dove Spring Formation
Genus	Species	Presence	Material	Notes	Images
Hesperolagomys	H. sp.	Kern County, California.		A pika.	
Hypolagus	H. sp.	Kern County, California.		A leporid.	

==== Proboscideans ====
Proboscideans reported from the Dove Spring Formation
Genus	Species	Presence	Material	Notes	Images
Gomphotherium	G. sp.	Kern County, California.		A gomphothere.	
Serbelodon	S. burnhami	Ricardo, Kern County, California.	Anterior portion of a mandible (F:AM 18228) & 2 tusk fragments (F:AM 18228A & 18228B).	An amebelodontid.	

==== Rodents ====
Rodents reported from the Dove Spring Formation
Genus	Species	Presence	Material	Notes	Images
Acrolophomys	A. rhodopetros		Teeth & dentary.	A cricetid.	
Ammospermophilus	A. sp.	Kern County, California.		An antelope squirrel.	
Antecalomys	A. coxae		Many teeth.	A sigmodontine.	
Bensonomys	B. sp.	Kern County, California.	Maxillae, a dentary & teeth.	A sigmodontine.	
Copemys	C. dentalis	Kern County, California.	Dentaries & teeth.	A cricetid.	
Copemys	C. cf. C. longidens	Kern County, California.		A cricetid.	
Copemys	C. russelli	Kern County, California.		A cricetid.	
Copemys	C. sp.	Kern County, California.		A cricetid.	
Copemys	C. sp., cf. C. dentalis		Teeth & jaw elements.	A cricetid.	
Cupidinimus	C. avawatzensis	Kern County, California.		A heteromyid also found in the Avawatz Formation.	
Cupidinimus	C. tertius	Kern County, California.		A heteromyid.	
Cupidinimus	C. sp.	Kern County, California.		A small heteromyid.	
Eucastor	E. sp.	Kern County, California.		A castorid.	
Leptodontomys	L. sp.	Kern County, California.		An eomyid.	
Lindsaymys	L. takeuchii	Kern County, California.	Multiple specimens.	A cotton rat.	
Lindsaymys	L. sp., cf. L. takeuchii	Kern County, California.	Multiple teeth.	A cotton rat.	
Lindsaymys	L. sp. A	Kern County, California.	Molars.	A cotton rat.	
Lindsaymys	L. sp. B	Kern County, California.	Molars.	A cotton rat.	
Parapliosaccomys	P. sp.	Kern County, California.		A gopher.	
Paronychomys	P. spp.	Kern County, California.		A cricetid.	
Perognathus	P. furlongi	Kern County, California.		A pocket-mouse.	
Perognathus	P. minutus	Kern County, California.		A pocket-mouse.	
Postcopemys	P. sp., cf. P. valensis		Teeth & dentary.	A cricetid.	
Protospermophilus	P. sp.	Kern County, California.		A squirrel.	
Repomys	"R." sp.	Kern County, California.		A cricetid.	
Repomys	cf. R. sp.		M2 (LACM 156378).	A cricetid.	
Tamias	T. ateles	Kern County, California.		A chipmunk.	
"Thomomys"	"T." sp.	Kern County, California.		A gopher.	

==== Ungulates ====
Ungulates reported from the Dove Spring Formation
Genus	Species	Presence	Material	Notes	Images
Aphelops	A. sp.	Kern County, California.		A rhinoceros.	
Cormohipparion	C. occidentale	Kern County, California.	Isolated teeth & a lower mandible.	Remains reassigned to C. sp.	
Cormohipparion	C. sp.	El Paso Basin.	Isolated teeth & a lower mandible.	An equid.	
Cosoryx	C. sp.	Kern County, California.		An antilocaprid.	
Dinohippus	D. cf. D. leardi	Kern County, California.		An equid.	
?Hemiauchenia	?H. sp.	Kern County, California.		A camelid.	
Hipparion	H. forcei	Kern County, California.		An equid.	
Hipparion	H. tejonensis	Kern County, California.		An equid.	
Ilingoceros	I. sp.	Kern County, California.		An antilocaprid.	
Megahippus	M. cf. M. matthewi	Kern County, California.		An equid.	
?Megatylopus	?M. sp.	Kern County, California.		A camelid.	
?Michenia	?M. sp.	Kern County, California.		A camelid.	
Paracosoryx	P. furlongi	Kern County, California.		An antilocaprid.	
Peraceras	P. sp.	Kern County, California.		A rhinoceros.	
Plioceros	P. sp.	Kern County, California.		An antilocaprid.	
Pliohippus	P. tantulus	Kern County, California.		An equid.	
Pliohippus	P. tejonensis	Kern County, California.		An equid.	
?Procamelus	?P. sp.	Kern County, California.		A camelid.	
?Prosthennops	?P. sp.	Kern County, California.		A peccary.	
Teleoceras	T. cf. T. meridianum	Kern County, California.		A rhinoceros.	
Ustatochoerus	U. californicus	Kern County, California.		A merycoidodontid.	
Ustatochoerus	U. cf. U. profectus	Kern County, California.		A merycoidodontid.	

=== Reptiles ===
==== Birds ====
Birds reported from the Dove Spring Formation
Genus	Species	Presence	Material	Notes	Images
Branta	B. howardae	Kern County, California.		A goose.	
Neophrontops	N. ricardoensis	Kern County, California.		A gypaetine vulture.	

==== Squamates ====
Squamates reported from the Dove Spring Formation
Genus	Species	Presence	Material	Notes	Images
Anguidae	Gen. indet.	Kern County, California.		A very large anguid lizard.	
Callisaurus	C. sp.	Kern County, California.		A zebra-tailed lizard.	
Gerrhonotus	G. cf. G. kingi	Kern County, California.		An alligator lizard.	
Lichanura	L. sp.	Kern County, California.		A rosy boa.	
Paleoheterodon	P. sp.	Kern County, California.		A colubrid snake.	
Paracoluber	P. sp.	Kern County, California.		A colubrid snake.	
Paragerrhonotus	P. ricardensis	Kern County, California.		An anguid lizard.	
Proptychophis	P. achoris	Red Rock Canyon State Park, Kern County, California.	Numerous vertebrae & the posterior portion of a right maxilla.	A colubrid snake.	
Sceloporus	S. sp.	Kern County, California.		A large spiny lizard.	
"Thamnophis"	"T." sp.	Kern County, California.		A garter snake.	
Uma	U. sp.	Locality LACM 4702.	A partial & fused premaxilla (LACM 159892).	A fringe-toed lizard.	
?Uta	?U. sp.	Kern County, California.		A side-blotched lizard.	
Xantusia	X. sp.	Kern County, California.		A night lizard.	

==== Testudines ====
Testudines reported from the Dove Spring Formation
Genus	Species	Presence	Material	Notes	Images
Clemmys	C. sp.	Kern County, California.		An emydine turtle.	
Geochelone	G. sp.	Kern County, California.		A tortoise.	
?Gopherus	?G. sp.	Kern County, California.		A gopher tortoise.	

=== Amphibians ===
Amphibians reported from the Dove Spring Formation
Genus	Species	Presence	Material	Notes	Images
Batrachoseps	B. sp.	Kern County, California.		A lungless salamander.	
Bufonidae		Kern County, California.		A true toad.	
cf. Ensatina	cf. E. sp.	Kern County, California.		A lungless salamander.	
Ranidae		Kern County, California.		A true frog.	

=== Fish ===
Fish reported from the Dove Spring Formation
Genus	Species	Presence	Material	Notes	Images
Empetrichthys	E. sp.	Kern County, California.		A splitfin.	

=== Plants ===
Plants reported from the Dove Spring Formation
Genus	Species	Presence	Material	Notes	Images
Acacia	A. sp.	Kern County, California.		An acacia.	
Ceanothus	C. sp.	Kern County, California.		A buckbrush.	
Cupressus	C. sp.	Kern County, California.		A cypress tree.	
Lycium	L. sp.	Kern County, California.		A box thorn.	
Palmoxylodon	P. mohavensis	Kern County, California.		A palm.	
Pinus	P. kelloggii	Kern County, California.		A pine.	
Quercus	Q. ricardensis	Kern County, California.		An oak tree.	
Robinia	R. alexanderi	Kern County, California.		A legume.	

== See also ==
- List of fossiliferous stratigraphic units in California
- Paleontology in California
