= South Belridge Oil Field =

Oil field in Kern County, California, USA

Coordinates: 35.4560°N 119.7246°W

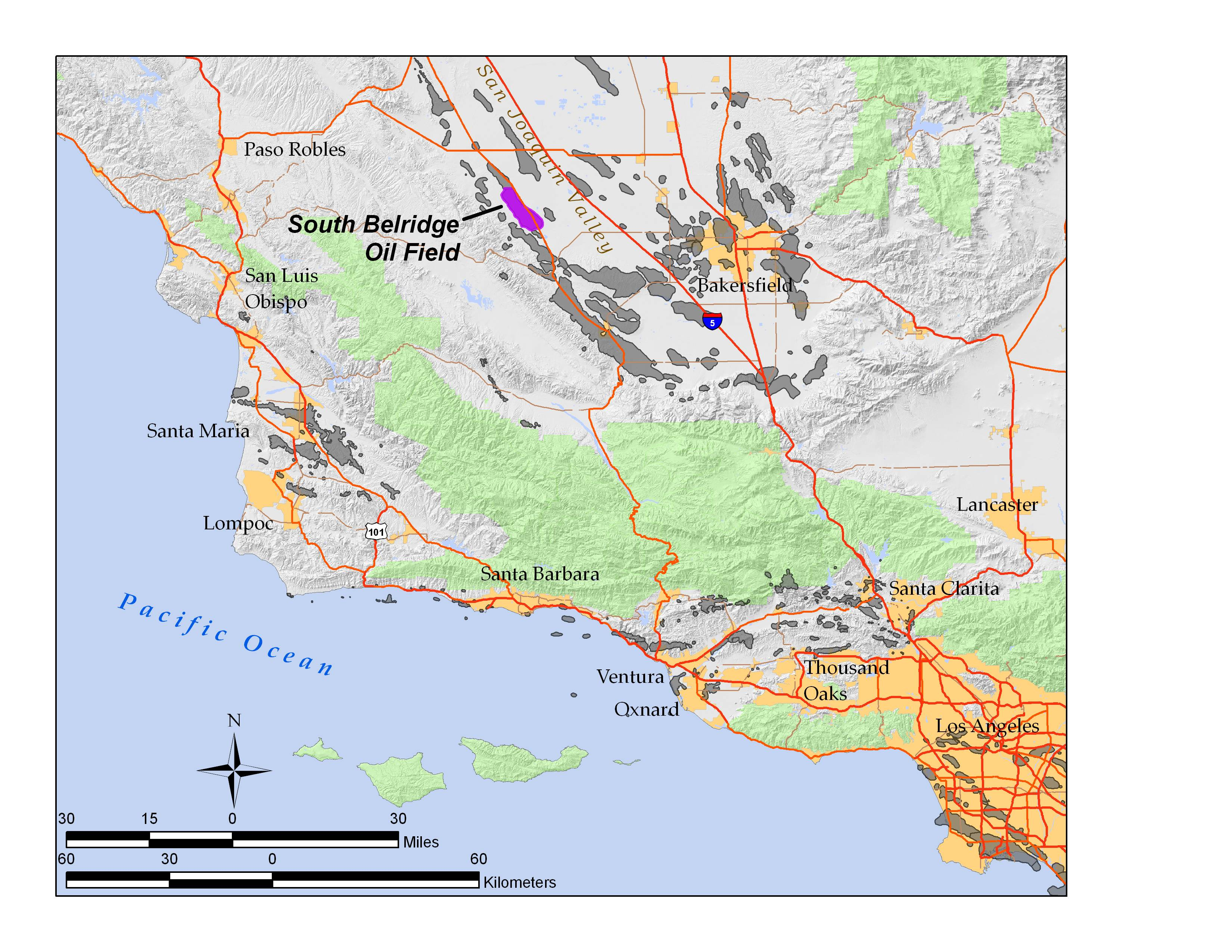
The South Belridge Oil Field in Southern and Central California. Other oil fields are shown in gray.

The South Belridge Oil Field is a large oil field in northwestern Kern County, San Joaquin Valley, California, about forty miles west of Bakersfield. Discovered in 1911, and having a cumulative production of over 2,000 million barrels (320,000,000 m^{3}) of oil equivalent at the end of 2023, it is the fourth-largest oil field in California, after the Midway-Sunset Oil Field, Kern River Oil Field, and Wilmington Oil Field, and is the sixth-most productive field in the United States. Its estimated remaining reserves, as of the end of 2008, were around 494 million barrels (78,500,000 m^{3}) out of approximately 10.2 billion barrels of original oil in place, and it had 6,253 active wells. The principal operator on the field was Aera Energy LLC, a joint venture between Royal Dutch Shell and ExxonMobil. Additionally, the field included the only onshore wells in California owned and operated by ExxonMobil.

== Setting ==
The oil field is located along State Route 33, between the junctions with State Route 58 on the south and State Route 46 on the north. The field is in an area of gentle slope to the southwest, just above the San Joaquin Valley which is adjacent on the east; the crest of the Temblor Range, the nearest part of the California Coast Ranges, parallels the oil field about ten miles to the southwest. The field is about 10 miles (16 km) long by 2 miles (3.2 km) wide, and encompasses a productive area of 9,420 acres (3,810 ha). Elevations on the oil field range from approximately 450 to 700 feet (140 to 210 m); the elevation of the floor of the San Joaquin Valley to the east is around 250 feet (76 m).

The South Belridge Oil Field is part of the larger Belridge Producing Complex of Aera Energy LLC, which includes also the smaller, but still substantial oil fields of North Belridge, Lost Hills, and Cymric, all in northwestern Kern County.

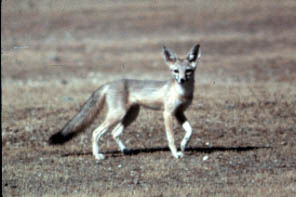
The San Joaquin kit fox. Kit foxes can be found on the South Belridge and other Kern County oil fields, as they are tolerant of disturbance, and sometimes use pipes and man-made openings as dens.

Most native vegetation is gone from the oil field, with the most dense operational areas being almost completely barren except for pumping units, drilling pads, evaporation ponds, storage tanks, steam generators, and associated equipment. In spite of this seeming sterility, species such as the endangered San Joaquin kit fox (vulpes macrotis mutica) continue to use areas of oil field development as habitat.

== Geology ==
The South Belridge Field is a southeast-plunging anticline, in which the oil has collected in pools in structural traps sealed by both above-lying impermeable units as well as tar seals. Most of the oil has pooled in the Tulare Formation, of Pleistocene age, and in the Diatomite Formation, of Pliocene−Miocene age. The oil itself probably originated in the underlying Monterey Formation, migrating upward to structural and stratigraphic traps over time.

== Extraction ==
A total of six oil pools have been found in the South Belridge: the Tulare, Etchegoin, Diatomite, Antelope Shale, McDonald, and Devilwater-Gould. Both the Tulare and Diatomite were discovered in 1911, and these are both the largest and nearest the surface, with average depths of 400 to 1,000 feet (120 to 300 m) respectively. The Antelope Shale, at 4,000 feet (1,200 m), and the McDonald, at 6,700 feet (2,000 m), are the deepest working pools, and are both in the Monterey Formation itself. The Devilwater-Gould, found in 1980 at a depth of 8,200 feet (2,500 m) feet, only produced from one well for nine months, and was abandoned.

Only two of the pools contained significant enough reserves to be subject to enhanced recovery projects: the Tulare and Diatomite, both of which have been steamflooded, waterflooded, and fireflooded. Operators began steamflooding the Tulare Formation in 1963 in order to increase production rates; as of 1997, this was the only enhanced recovery technology still in use there. Oil from the Tulare Formation is heavy crude, with a specific gravity of 10–13 API, and a low sulfur content of 0.23%, while oil from the Diatomite is classified as medium crude, with an API index of 25–30.

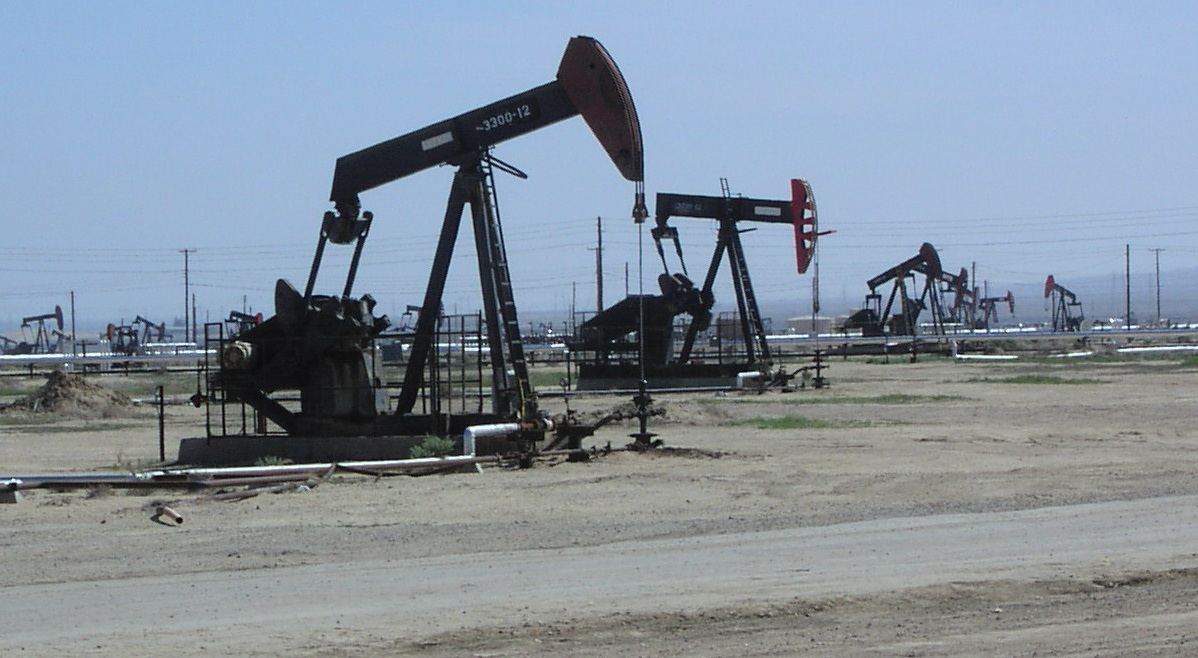
A row of nodding donkey oil wells at the South Belridge Field

== History ==
The South Belridge Oil Field was discovered in April 1911 by Mericos (Max) Whittier. Whittier and partner Burton E. Green recruited three other investors and together formed the Belridge Oil Company, which purchased the 33,000 acre property for $1,000,000.

Belridge Oil Company retained control of operations until 1979 when Shell Oil purchased the company along with most of the production rights on the South Belridge Field for $3.65 billion. At the time, the sale of Belridge Oil Company was the largest corporate acquisition in U.S. history.

=== Operations ===
As of 2023 Aera Energy LLC is the main operator on the field. They claim a daily production of 140,000 barrels (22,000 m^{3}) of oil equivalent (boe/d) from the entire Belridge Unit, with the oil being shipped to the refineries in Martinez and Torrance for processing into gasoline and other products.

As of the end of 2006 Aera Energy was the second-largest producer of oil in California, after Chevron Corp.

== Solar EOR Project ==
In November 2017, GlassPoint and Aera Energy announced a joint project to add a solar EOR field to the South Belridge Oil Field. This new facility is projected to produce approximately 12 million barrels of steam per year through a 850MW thermal solar steam generator. It is also projected to cut carbon emissions from the oil field by 376,000 metric tons per year.

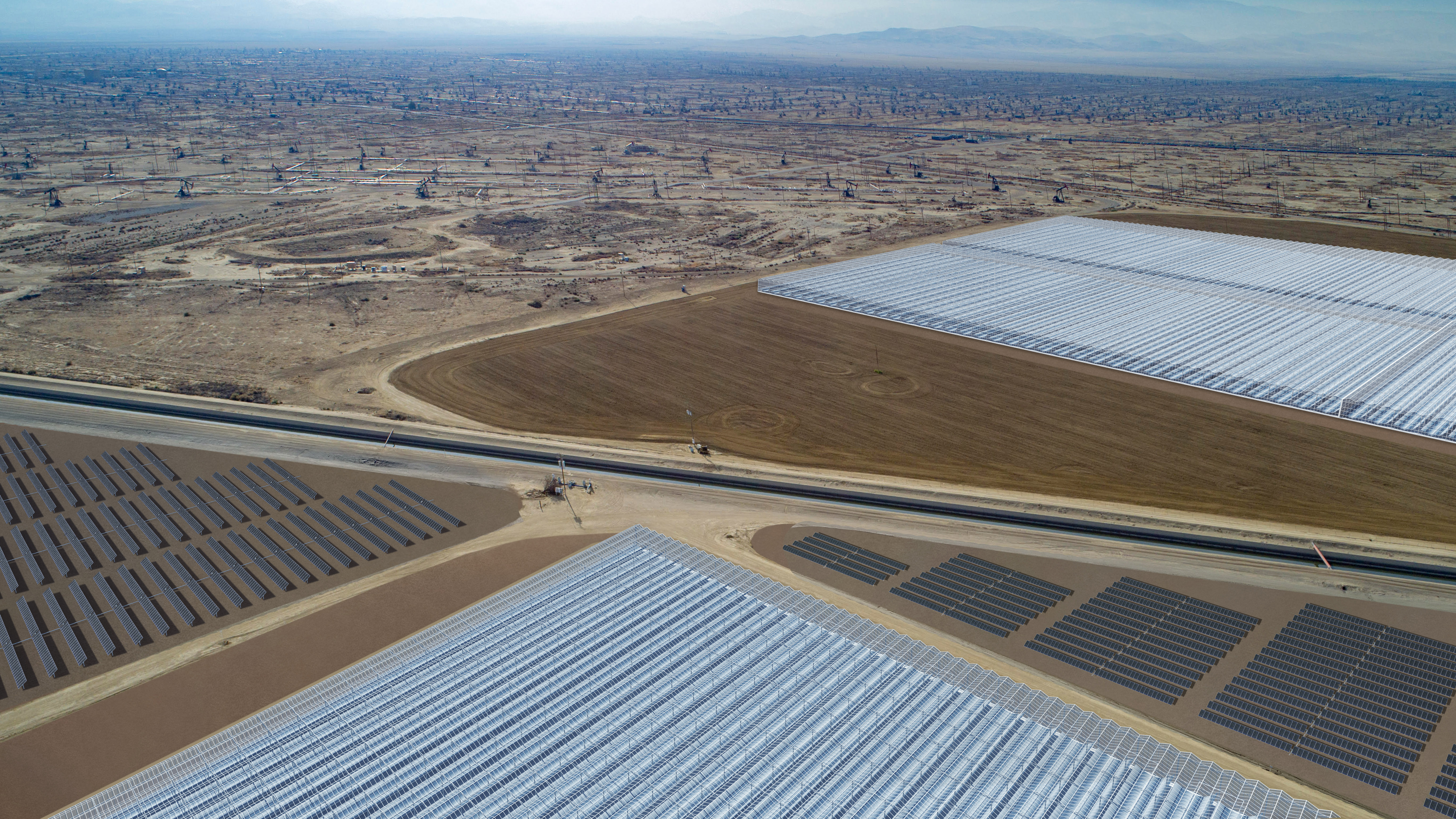
A rendering of the in-development solar field being built at the South Belridge Field

== See also ==
- North Belridge Oil Field
