= Mountain View Oil Field =

Oil field in Kern County, California, United States

Coordinates: 35.2490°N 118.8703°W

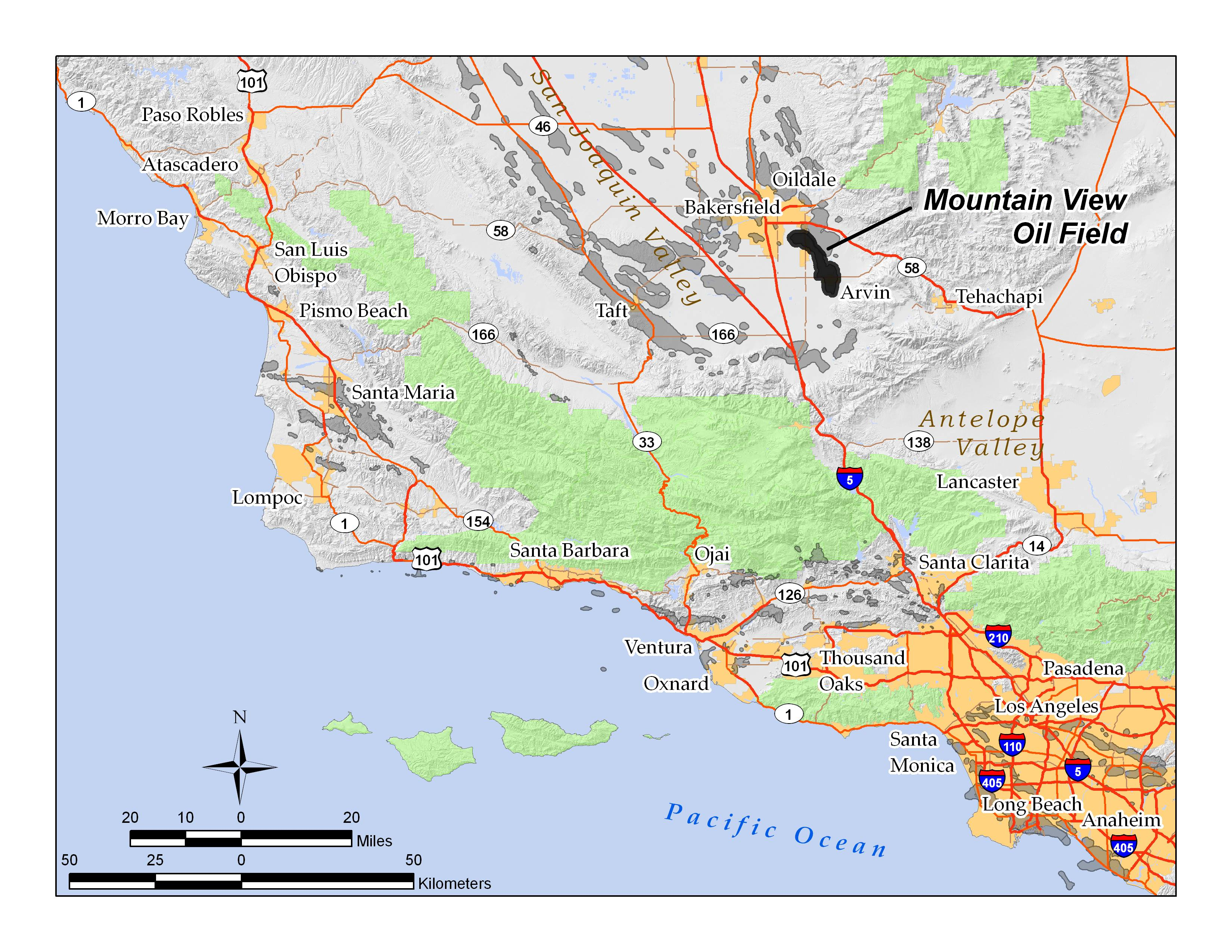
- The Mountain View Oil Field in central California. Other oil fields are shown in dark gray.
- Country: United States
- Region: San Joaquin Basin
- Location: Kern County, California
- Offshore/onshore: onshore
- Operators: Atlantic, Pyramid, Sunray, The Termo, numerous others

Field history
- Discovery: 1933
- Start of development: 1933
- Start of production: 1933
- Peak year: 1936

Production
- Current production of oil: 437.5 barrels per day (~21,800 t/a)
- Year of current production of oil: 2008
- Estimated oil in place: 0.792 million barrels (~1.08×10^{5} t)
- Producing formations: Walker (Oligocene), Santa Margarita (Miocene), Fruitvale (Miocene), Olcese (Miocene), Round Mountain (Miocene), Freeman-Jewett (Miocene), Chanac (Pliocene-Miocene), Kern River (Pleistocene), unnamed schist (Jurassic)

The Mountain View Oil Field is a large, mature, but still-productive oil field in Kern County, California, in the United States, in the extreme southern part of the San Joaquin Valley southeast of Bakersfield. It underlies the town of Arvin, as well as some smaller agricultural communities. The field is spread out across a large area, covering just under 8 square miles (21 km^{2}), with wells and storage facilities widely dispersed throughout the area, scattered among working agricultural fields of broccoli and carrots as well as citrus orchards. Discovered in 1933, it has produced over 90 million barrels (14,000,000 m^{3}) of oil in its lifetime, and although declining in production is one of the few inland California fields in which new oil is still being discovered.

As of the beginning of 2009, the field had numerous operators, unlike some of the larger, monolithic fields such as the Kern River field to the north, which is entirely owned by Chevron Corporation. Only independent oil companies operate on the Mountain View Field. Of the 175 active wells on the field in 2009, the largest operator was Atlantic Oil Company, with 49 producing wells; the second largest was Sunray Petroleum, with 22. Overall there were 23 separate operators, one of the most of any field in California.

== Environmental setting ==
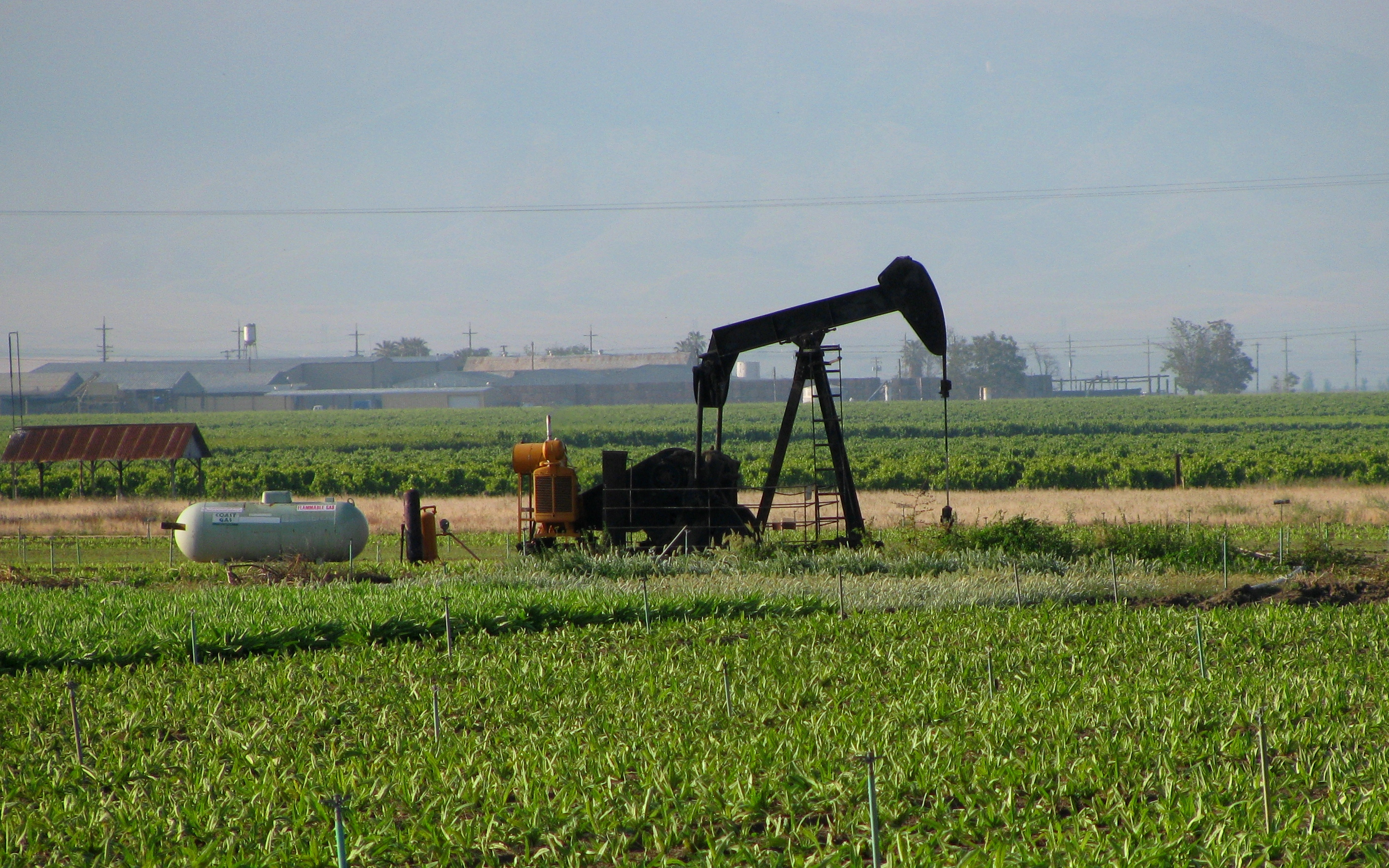
Gas-powered oil well within the Mountain View field, surrounded by row crops

Unlike the largest of the Kern County oil fields which occupy the arid hilly region ringing the Central Valley, the Mountain View field is one of several which entirely underlie the flat, richly agricultural valley bottomlands. It is long and relatively narrow, with the productive area of the field being almost 15 miles (24 km) long from its northwest to southeast extents, and from 1 to 3 miles (1.6 to 4.8 km) across. It averages 1/4 mile in width, and will probably be 1/2 mile wide when fully developed. It consists of discontiguous areas, many of which are small, isolated, and some of which are abandoned. Land use in the field is mainly agricultural, although the field also underlies the entire town of Arvin, as well as several small unincorporated communities. Oil wells are scattered throughout the region, never densely clustered; some are adjacent to homes in Arvin itself, and many are situated within clearings in the area's abundant orchards and fields of row crops.

Two state highways pass through the field: California State Route 184, which runs south to north through the town of Lamont, passing through the extreme northwestern portion of the productive region; and Route 223 (Bear Mountain Boulevard), which goes west to east through the town of Arvin and then into the Tehachapi Mountains. Paved roads run along the section lines throughout at 1 mile (1.6 km) intervals.

Terrain in the vicinity of the oil field is almost table-flat, with elevations ranging from approximately 400 to 500 feet (120 to 150 m) above sea level throughout the productive region. The land rises with a slight gradient to the south and east, in the direction of the foothills of the Tehachapi Mountains. Climate is typical of the southern San Joaquin Valley, and is arid. Temperatures in the summer routinely exceed 100 °F (38 °C) on cloudless days. Rain falls mainly in the winter months, and averages 5 to 6 inches (130 to 150 mm) annually. Freezes occur occasionally during the winter, and the winter months are also subject to frequent dense tule fogs, limiting visibility to near zero. Drainage from the field is generally into the irrigation canal system, but because of the flat surface gradient most rainfall soaks directly into the ground.

Air quality in the vicinity of the oil field, and in Kern County in general, is among the worst in the United States. In 2009 Kern County had the worst particulate pollution in the U.S., and was second-worst for ozone, after Los Angeles.

== Geology ==
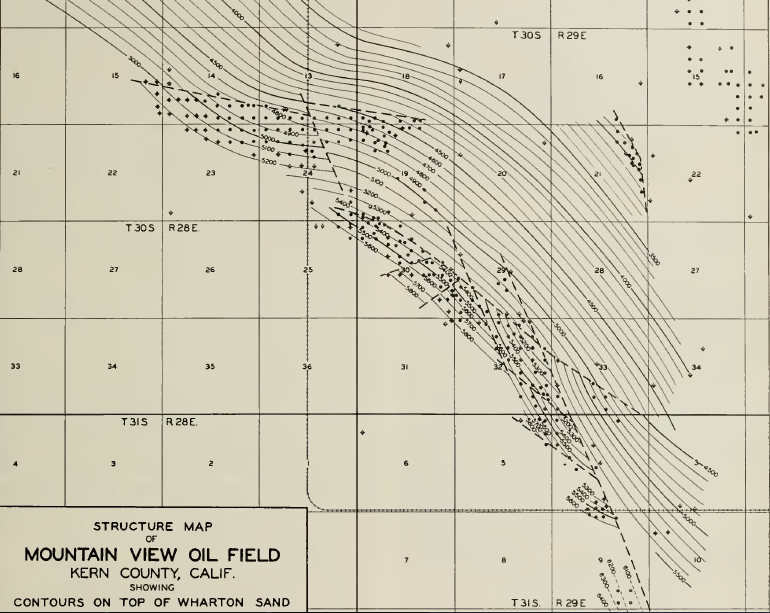
Mountain View Oil Field Structure Map

The Mountain View field is within the Southeast Stable Shelf, the southeastern extremity of the San Joaquin Basin Province, a region that contains numerous individual oil fields, including one of the largest in the United States – the Kern River Oil Field. Unlike many of the fields in the surrounding foothills and uplands, the geology of the Mountain View field gives no surface expression at all, since the deep surface alluvium buries all trace of the underlying structures trapping petroleum. Discovery came by wildcat-well prospecting. Since fields to the north, including Kern River, Kern Front, and Edison, were already producing, it was a reasonable inference that their oil-bearing strata extended to the south, out of sight underneath the alluvium.

The overall structure of the field is a faulted homocline, with all the sedimentary units dipping in the same direction with little folding. The formations have a general strike towards the northwest, and dip to the southwest about 1,200 feet (370 m) for each mile. Updip migration of petroleum is blocked by impermeable units placed there by vertical fault offsets, with the faults being numerous, and the largest roughly following the strike of the beds.

Numerous oil-producing formations have been identified within the Mountain View field, ranging in age from the basement Jurassic schist, which itself contains some oil pools, all the way to Pliocene-Pleistocene at the top of the stratigraphic column. Viewed from above, the field is broken out into five discontiguous areas: the large Main Area, the Arvin and West Arvin areas near the town of that name, the abandoned Di Giorgio Area, and the Vaccaro Area in the extreme south-southeast.

== History, production, and operations ==
Numerous attempts were made to find the field, which was long suspected to exist. The first well in the area was drilled in 1924, and produced a small amount of oil, failing after four days. In the following years several more wells were drilled, including some by Shell Oil and Mohawk Petroleum Company, but all failed until Hogan Petroleum hit the rich Wharton pool in the Santa Margarita Formation at about 5,500 feet (1,700 m) below ground surface in May 1933. This well initially produced 3,200 barrels per day (510 m^{3}/d) with a pressure of approximately 2,500 pounds per square inch (17,000 kPa)—a strong finding that brought other drillers to the area in short order.

Subsequent wells expanding outwards from the discovery well delineated the limits of the main productive area by the late 1930s. In 1936, Mohawk Petroleum discovered the DiGiorgio Area by hitting oil in the Santa Margarita Formation. The West Arvin area was discovered in 1937, with a well drilled into the Cattani pool of the Chanac Formation. Also in 1937, General Petroleum Corp. of California discovered the Vaccaro Area. Each of these areas yielded subsequent discoveries in other deeper pools throughout the 1940s and 1950s. In 1986, a new discovery was made in the Kern River Formation in the Arvin Area, and smaller pools continue to be found in the widely dispersed oil field – for example, in 2006 Vaquero Energy, one of the field's current operators, found a new pool in the once-abandoned DiGiorgio area in the underlying schist basement rock.

As of the beginning of 2009, 175 wells remained active on the field, distributed between five discontiguous areas. Field-wide, the average production per well is 2.5 barrels (0.40 m^{3}) of oil per day, with an 81 percent water cut (approximately four barrels of water come out of the reservoir for every barrel of oil). The Main Area remains the most productive, followed by the West Arvin and Arvin areas; many of the wells in these areas are slant-drilled to reach formations directly under the town.
