= Impacts of California High-Speed Rail =

Impacts of the California High-Speed Rail system

In addition to the direct reduction in travel times the HSR project will produce, there are also economic and environmental impacts of the high-speed rail system. These were also specifically noted in Proposition 1A at the time the project sought authorization from the voters of the state in 2008. The anticipated benefits apply both generally to the state overall, as well as to the regions the train will pass through, and to the areas immediately around the train stations.

== Estimates of current and past impacts ==
=== Latest impact information, overall and by region ===
On January 18, 2024, Derek Boughton of the Authority presented the latest financial impact analysis report through June 2023.

Overall Impacts
($ in Billions)	2019-20	2020-21	2021-22	2022-23	Total
Program Expenditures	$1,521	$1,216	$1,250	$1,416	$11,177
In Disadvantaged Communities	$522	$974	$665	$743	$936
Job-Years	9,900	10,100	9,700	12,000	92,200
Labor Income	$0.78	$0.84	$0.83	$0.94	$7.00
Economic Output	$2.21	$2.23	$2.28	$2.46	$11.40

Impacts by Region
($ in Millions)	Job-Years	Labor Income	Economic Output
Sacramento	15,170	$111.0	$261.0
Bay Area	9,110	$20.4	$53.4
Central Valley	41,510	2,520	7,740
Southern California	12,860	980	2,590
Rest of State	13,510	1,490	3,330

=== Job training: The Central Valley Training Center ===
The Central Valley Training Center (located in Selma, California) is an organization supported by the Authority and local non-profit and governmental organizations. Since 2020 it has provided hands-on, free, 12-week pre-apprenticeship programs in 11 trades to prepare Central Valley veterans, at-risk young adults, minority, and low-income populations for construction jobs on the CAHSR project. As of December 2023 it has graduated 11 cohorts, totaling over 176 students, and further assisted them by providing job placement as well as other support services.

=== Annual sustainability reports ===
CAHSR is designed to be an entirely environmentally sustainable system. Each year since 2018 the Authority has produced a Sustainability Report. Highlights of the 2022 report are:

- "Restoring more than 2,972 acres of habitat and protecting more than 3,190 acres of agricultural land;
- Planting more than 7,100 trees;
- Avoiding or sequestering 420,245 metric tons of carbon dioxide – the equivalent of removing one natural gas-fired power plant from the grid for a year;
- Increasing small business participation to over 700 entities;
- Generating between $12.7 and 13.7 billion in total economic activity in the state, with 56% investment in disadvantaged communities."

=== Cumulative economic impact estimates ===
The 2021 Economic Impact Factsheet estimated that as of June 2021, the statewide economic benefits of the project included 64,400–70,500 job-years of employment, $4.8–$5.2 billion in labor employment, and $12.7–13.7 billion in economic output, and that as of February 2022, 699 small businesses were involved in the project.

The Authority's economic impact analysis is updated annually. The 2021 Economic Analysis Report contains data as of June 2021.

=== STB estimates of regional needs ===
In its 67-page ruling in May 2015, the federal Surface Transportation Board noted: "The current transportation system in the San Joaquin Valley region has not kept pace with the increase in population, economic activity, and tourism. ... The interstate highway system, commercial airports, and conventional passenger rail systems serving the intercity market are operating at or near capacity and would require large public investments for maintenance and expansion to meet existing demand and future growth over the next 25 years or beyond." Thus, the Board sees the HSR system as providing valuable benefits to the region's transportation needs.

The San Joaquin Valley is also one of the poorest areas of the state. For example, the unemployment rate near the end of 2014 in Fresno County was 2.2% higher than the statewide average. And, of the five poorest metro areas in the country, three are in the Central Valley. The HSR system has the potential to significantly improve this region and its economy. A large January 2015 report to the CHSRA examined this issue.

In addition to jobs and income levels in general, the presence of HSR is expected to benefit the growth in the cities around the HSR stations. It is anticipated that this will help increase population density in those cities and reduce "development sprawl" out into surrounding farmlands.

=== Negatively-affected local communities ===
There have also been some reported negative impacts from the project's land acquisitions and constructions. As of October 2021 in the Phase 1 construction the project displaced or adversely affected immigrants (Mexican, Cambodian, and Japanese), homeless outreach organizations, homeless shelters, firefighters, nonprofits working with welfare recipients, thrift stores, and disadvantaged communities such as Wasco.

== Future projections for the Interim Initial Operating Segment ==
"What Is the Value of Electrified High-Speed Rail Between Merced and Bakersfield?" in the 2022 Business Plan (p. 25) listed these estimated benefits which will come from the Interim Initial Operating Segment:

- Travel time will be significantly shorted, and travel will be more reliable. Car travel time is 2.5 hrs. one-way. The Amtrak San Joaquin takes 3 hrs. at best, but there are only 7 round-trips each day, and intervening freight service makes service unreliable. CAHSR is estimated to reduce travel time by up to 100 minutes, and 18 reliable round-trips are anticipated each day.
- With better transit inside the Central Valley, transit to the Bay Area and Sacramento as well as Southern California will improve significantly.
- Rail passenger trips over the same route are projected to nearly double, from 4.8 million annual riders to 8.8 million riders.
- Annual vehicle miles traveled will be reduced by 284 million, reducing road congestion.
- Greenhouse gas (GHG) emissions will be reduced by 50.6 thousand metric tons, equivalent to emissions from 10,874 passenger vehicles driven for one year.
- An additional $117.2 million in passenger revenues.
- More than 200,000 job-years due to the line's operation and community effects.

== Environmental issues ==
=== Wildlife protection ===
The HSR tracks will pose some serious problems for moving and migrating wildlife. Thus, the Interim Initial Operating Segment will have over 300 wildlife crossings to provide safe ways for wildlife to cross the tracks. To accomplish this, the Authority has submitted a $2 million grant to the Federal Highway Administration Wildlife Crossings Pilot Program for the proposed Central Valley 119-Mile Wildlife Crossing Monitoring Plan (total cost to be $2.5 million). This pilot project will study alternative crossing designs, research and monitor wildlife/vehicle collisions, and review the San Joaquin kit fox migration corridors.

=== Environmental benefit calculations ===
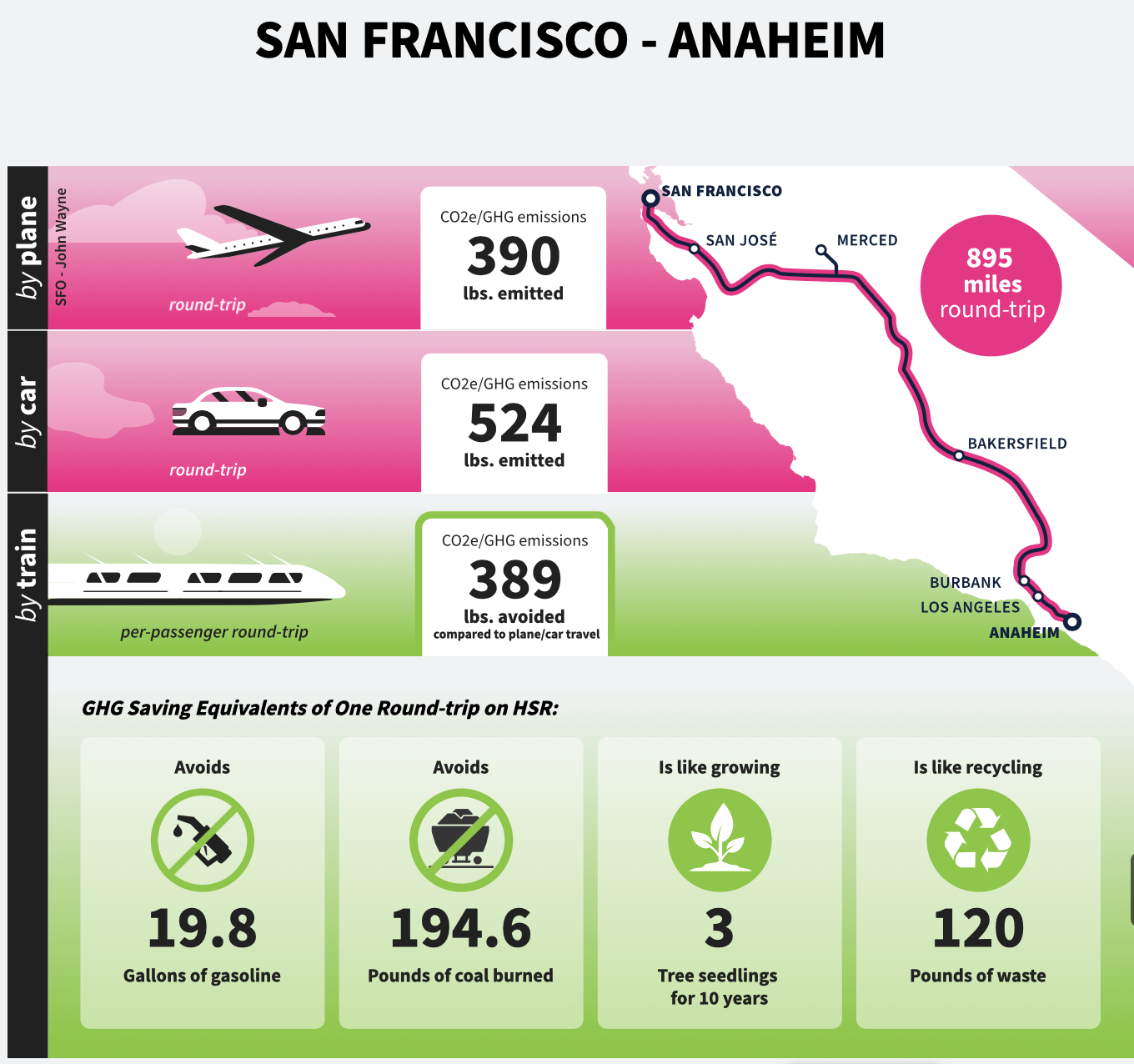
Estimated Carbon calculator – San Francisco to Anaheim.

The Authority's Carbon Footprint Calculator shows the benefits for 5 different portions of the HSR route, including all of Phase 1 as well as the Interim Initial Operating Segment. It gives estimates of green house gas emissions of planes, autos, and HSR trains as well as the savings that using the train would create.

The HSR savings estimates (per round trip) are:

- 142 pounds on the Merced-Bakersfield line (Interim IOS)
- 349 pounds for San Francisco-Los Angeles
- 303 pounds for San Jose-Burbank
- 389 pounds for San Francisco-Anaheim
- 337 pounds for San Francisco-Burbank

In the 2022 Business Plan the Authority estimates that by 2040, the system could carry 50 million riders per year, and that at full operation, the reduction of greenhouse gas emissions will be equivalent to removing 400,000 vehicles off the road.
