= Kern River Beds =

Rock formation in California

Kern River Beds Formation
- Stratigraphic range: Neogene
- Type: Formation
- Underlies: Pleistocene alluvium
- Overlies: Etchegoin Formation, Chanac Formation
- Thickness: 500–2,600 feet (150–790 m)

Location
- Region: San Joaquin Valley, Kern County, California
- Country: United States

Type section
- Named for: Kern River

The Kern River Beds Formation is a Neogene Period geologic formation in the southeastern San Joaquin Valley, within Kern County, California.

== Geography ==
The Kern River Beds Formation crops out in a roughly crescent-shaped belt, about 12 miles (19 km) wide at its widest, from Caliente Creek on the south to the Terra Bella vicinity on the north, a length of around 50 miles (80 km). It ranges from 500–2,600 feet (150–790 m) in thickness. Where it does not outcrop, it is overlaid by Pleistocene Period alluvium.

== Geology ==
The Kern River Series is composed of non-marine gravels, sands, and clays unconformably overlying the marine Miocene Period rocks in the Kern River area of the San Joaquin Valley. The Kern River Series is divided into an upper unit, the Kern River Beds Formation, and a lower unit named the Chanac Formation, with the wedge of the Etchegoin Formation in the middle in the central and western sections.

The Kern River Beds consists mostly of pale-yellow to light-brown sandstone and conglomerate, with interbeds of greenish-gray or greenish-brown siltstone and mudstone.

=== Oil sands ===
The Kern River Oil Field wells are located on a section of the formation north of the Kern River Bluffs and Bakersfield. The producing interval in the Kern River Formation of the Kern River oil field has been divided into two zones separated by water-bearing sand lentils. The lower producing zone is called the China Grade Zone, and the upper is the Kern River Zone.

=== Fossils ===
The Kern River Beds Formation preserves fossils dating back to the Neogene Period of the Cenozoic Era.

== See also ==
- Geology of Kern County, California
- Neogene California
- List of fossiliferous stratigraphic units in California
- Paleontology in California
