= Chanac Formation =

Geologic formation in the San Joaquin Valley, California, US

- Stratigraphic range: Neogene
- Type: Geological formation
- Underlies: Etchegoin Formation, Kern River Beds Formation
- Overlies: Santa Margarita Formation

Location
- Region: San Joaquin Valley, Kern County, California
- Country: United States

The Chanac Formation is a Cenozoic Era sandstone geologic formation in the southeastern San Joaquin Valley, within Kern County, California.

== Geology ==
The Kern River Series is divided into the lower Chanac Formation unit, and the upper Kern River Beds Formation unit, with the wedge of the Etchegoin Formation in the middle in the western section. It is composed of sandstone and cobble conglomerate. It overlies the Miocene period Santa Margarita Formation.

It preserves fossils dating back to the Neogene period.

== Fossil content ==
=== Mammals ===
==== Carnivorans ====
Carnivorans reported from the Chanac Formation
Genus	Species	Presence	Material	Notes	Images
Borophagus	B. littoralis	North Tejon Hills, Kern County, California.	Left molar (LACM 16585).	A borophagine dog also found in the Green Valley, Santa Margarita and Dove Spring formations.	
Epicyon	E. haydeni	North Tejon Hills, Kern County, California.	Nuchal fragment of skull (LACM 16581).	A borophagine dog.	

== See also ==
- Geology of Kern County, California
- Neogene California
- List of fossiliferous stratigraphic units in California
- Paleontology in California
