= Wasco, California =

City in California, United States

Wasco
- City
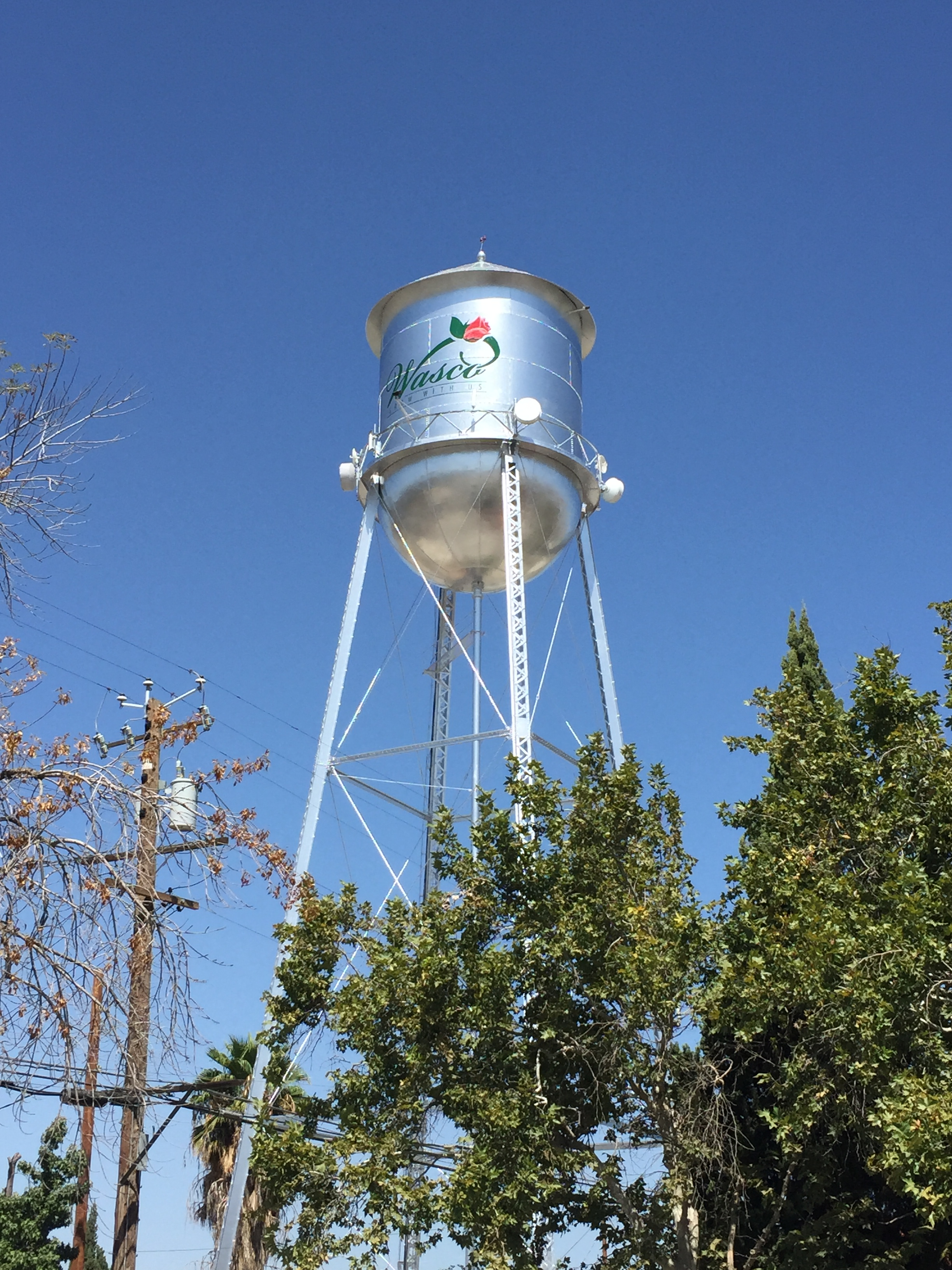
- Water tower in Wasco
- Motto: "Grow With Us"
- Interactive map of Wasco
- Location in the United States Wasco (the United States)
- Coordinates: 35°35′42″N 119°23′02″W
- Country: United States
- State: California
- County: Kern
- Incorporated: December 22, 1945
- Named for: Sources unclear, either Wasco County, Oregon or Western American Sugar Company

Government
  - State senator: Melissa Hurtado (D)
  - Assemblymember: Jasmeet Bains (D)
  - U. S. Rep.: David Valadao (R)

Area
  - Total: 9.39 sq mi (24.32 km^{2})
  - Land: 9.39 sq mi (24.32 km^{2})
  - Water: 0 sq mi (0.00 km^{2})
- Elevation: 312 ft (95 m)

Population (2020)
  - Total: 27,047
  - Density: 2,880/sq mi (1,112/km^{2})
- Time zone: UTC-8 (PST)
  - Summer (DST): UTC-7 (PDT)
- ZIP code: 93280
- Area code: 661
- FIPS code: 06-83542
- GNIS feature ID: 2412185
- Website: www.cityofwasco.org

Wasco (formerly Dewey and Deweyville) is a city in the San Joaquin Valley, in Kern County, California, United States. Wasco is located 24 miles (39 km) northwest of Bakersfield, at an elevation of 328 feet (100 m). The population was 27,047 at the 2020 census, up from 25,545 at the 2010 census.

Wasco is the headquarters of the Tejon Indian Tribe of California, a federally recognized tribe of Kitanemuk, Yokuts, and Chumash Indigenous people of California.

== History ==
The name Dewey was in honor of Admiral George Dewey, a hero of the Spanish–American War. The Deweyville post office opened in 1899, and changed its name to Wasco in 1907.

The origin of the name Wasco is subject of two different theories: (1) That it was coined from Western American Sugar Company; and (2) that it was named by a resident from Wasco County, Oregon.

Wasco is the site of the Fourth Home Extension Colony, founded in 1907 by the American Home Extension Association.

== Geography ==
According to the United States Census Bureau, the city has a total area of 9.4 square miles (24 km^{2}), all land. At the 2000 census, according to the United States Census Bureau, the city had a total area of 7.6 square miles (20 km^{2}), all land. Wasco is located on the floor of the San Joaquin Valley, at the intersection of California State Routes 43, which runs north–south, and 46, which runs east–west.

=== Climate ===
According to the Köppen Climate Classification system, Wasco has a semi-arid climate (BSh, bordering on BSk) with extremely hot, dry summers and mild to cool winters. The average annual mean temperature is 64.1 °F (17.8 °C).

Climate data for Wasco, California (1991–2020 normals, extremes 1901–present)
Month	Jan	Feb	Mar	Apr	May	Jun	Jul	Aug	Sep	Oct	Nov	Dec	Year
Record high °F (°C)	81 (27)	86 (30)	100 (38)	102 (39)	109 (43)	113 (45)	116 (47)	115 (46)	113 (45)	110 (43)	92 (33)	85 (29)	116 (47)
Mean maximum °F (°C)	70.6 (21.4)	76.0 (24.4)	83.4 (28.6)	92.2 (33.4)	100.1 (37.8)	106.3 (41.3)	107.6 (42.0)	107.3 (41.8)	104.1 (40.1)	94.8 (34.9)	80.1 (26.7)	70.9 (21.6)	109.5 (43.1)
Mean daily maximum °F (°C)	58.5 (14.7)	65.1 (18.4)	71.3 (21.8)	77.2 (25.1)	86.0 (30.0)	93.9 (34.4)	100.0 (37.8)	98.8 (37.1)	93.5 (34.2)	82.4 (28.0)	68.5 (20.3)	58.6 (14.8)	79.5 (26.4)
Daily mean °F (°C)	47.6 (8.7)	52.5 (11.4)	57.8 (14.3)	63.2 (17.3)	71.6 (22.0)	77.6 (25.3)	83.4 (28.6)	81.6 (27.6)	77.6 (25.3)	66.8 (19.3)	55.1 (12.8)	47.2 (8.4)	66.0 (18.9)
Mean daily minimum °F (°C)	36.6 (2.6)	40.0 (4.4)	44.2 (6.8)	49.2 (9.6)	57.3 (14.1)	61.3 (16.3)	66.8 (19.3)	64.4 (18.0)	59.8 (15.4)	51.1 (10.6)	41.7 (5.4)	35.7 (2.1)	50.7 (10.4)
Mean minimum °F (°C)	28.2 (−2.1)	30.7 (−0.7)	35.2 (1.8)	38.9 (3.8)	45.6 (7.6)	50.7 (10.4)	58.7 (14.8)	57.3 (14.1)	52.1 (11.2)	40.7 (4.8)	31.3 (−0.4)	26.9 (−2.8)	25.3 (−3.7)
Record low °F (°C)	12 (−11)	18 (−8)	20 (−7)	21 (−6)	33 (1)	32 (0)	46 (8)	40 (4)	33 (1)	25 (−4)	17 (−8)	13 (−11)	12 (−11)
Average precipitation inches (mm)	1.29 (33)	1.16 (29)	1.37 (35)	0.63 (16)	0.27 (6.9)	0.13 (3.3)	0.01 (0.25)	0.02 (0.51)	0.03 (0.76)	0.51 (13)	0.58 (15)	1.11 (28)	7.11 (180.72)
Average precipitation days	6.9	6.2	5.6	3.4	1.4	0.4	0.1	0.1	0.3	1.5	3.3	5.1	34.3
Source: NOAA

== Demographics ==
Historical population
Census	Pop.	Note	%±
1950	5,592		—
1960	6,841		22.3%
1970	8,269		20.9%
1980	9,613		16.3%
1990	12,412		29.1%
2000	21,263		71.3%
2010	25,545		20.1%
2020	27,047		5.9%
U.S. Decennial Census

=== Racial and ethnic composition ===
Wasco city, California – Racial and ethnic composition Note: the US Census treats Hispanic/Latino as an ethnic category. This table excludes Latinos from the racial categories and assigns them to a separate category. Hispanics/Latinos may be of any race.
Race / Ethnicity (NH = Non-Hispanic)	Pop 2000	Pop 2010	Pop 2020	% 2000	% 2010	% 2020
White alone (NH)	4,588	3,689	2,238	21.58%	14.44%	8.27%
Black or African American alone (NH)	2,088	1,802	1,428	9.82%	7.05%	5.28%
Native American or Alaska Native alone (NH)	97	105	72	0.46%	0.41%	0.27%
Asian alone (NH)	126	162	134	0.59%	0.63%	0.50%
Native Hawaiian or Pacific Islander alone (NH)	24	7	14	0.11%	0.03%	0.05%
Other race alone (NH)	34	70	43	0.16%	0.27%	0.16%
Mixed race or Multiracial (NH)	119	125	196	0.56%	0.49%	0.72%
Hispanic or Latino (any race)	14,187	19,585	22,922	66.72%	76.67%	84.75%
Total	21,263	25,545	27,047	100.00%	100.00%	100.00%

=== 2020 census ===
As of the 2020 census, Wasco had a population of 27,047 and a population density of 2,881.3 inhabitants per square mile (1,112.5/km^{2}). The median age was 29.5 years. The age distribution was 28.3% under the age of 18, 12.2% aged 18 to 24, 33.7% aged 25 to 44, 18.5% aged 45 to 64, and 7.2% who were 65 years of age or older. For every 100 females there were 135.9 males, and for every 100 females age 18 and over there were 152.9 males age 18 and over.

The census reported that 83.8% of the population lived in households, 0.1% lived in non-institutionalized group quarters, and 16.1% were institutionalized. 82.2% of residents lived in urban areas, while 17.8% lived in rural areas.

There were 6,109 households, of which 57.5% had children under the age of 18 living in them. Of all households, 52.1% were married-couple households, 8.7% were cohabiting couple households, 25.2% had a female householder with no spouse or partner present, and 14.0% had a male householder with no spouse or partner present. About 11.7% of households were made up of individuals, and 4.8% had someone living alone who was 65 years of age or older. The average household size was 3.71. There were 5,123 families (83.9% of all households).

There were 6,366 housing units at an average density of 678.2 units per square mile (261.9 units/km^{2}), of which 6,109 (96.0%) were occupied. Of the occupied units, 55.2% were owner-occupied and 44.8% were occupied by renters. The homeowner vacancy rate was 0.6%, and the rental vacancy rate was 4.8%.

=== 2023 ACS estimates ===
In 2023, the US Census Bureau estimated that the median household income was $55,521, and the per capita income was $17,760. About 19.4% of families and 19.2% of the population were below the poverty line.

=== 2010 census ===
At the 2010 census Wasco had a population of 25,545. The population density was 2,710.1 inhabitants per square mile (1,046.4/km^{2}). The racial makeup of Wasco was 12,579 (49.2%) White, 1,951 (7.6%) African American, 283 (1.1%) Native American, 180 (0.7%) Asian, 12 (0.0%) Pacific Islander, 9,714 (38.0%) from other races, and 826 (3.2%) from two or more races. Hispanic or Latino of any race were 19,585 persons (76.7%).

The census reported that 19,825 people (77.6% of the population) lived in households, 10 (0%) lived in non-institutionalized group quarters, and 5,710 (22.4%) were institutionalized.

There were 5,131 households, 3,143 (61.3%) had children under the age of 18 living in them, 2,894 (56.4%) were opposite-sex married couples living together, 992 (19.3%) had a female householder with no husband present, 484 (9.4%) had a male householder with no wife present. There were 478 (9.3%) unmarried opposite-sex partnerships, and 27 (0.5%) same-sex married couples or partnerships. 575 households (11.2%) were one person and 243 (4.7%) had someone living alone who was 65 or older. The average household size was 3.86. There were 4,370 families (85.2% of households); the average family size was 4.11.

The age distribution was 7,351 people (28.8%) under the age of 18, 3,687 people (14.4%) aged 18 to 24, 8,621 people (33.7%) aged 25 to 44, 4,593 people (18.0%) aged 45 to 64, and 1,293 people (5.1%) who were 65 or older. The median age was 28.3 years. For every 100 females, there were 160.3 males. For every 100 females age 18 and over, there were 192.5 males.

There were 5,477 housing units at an average density of 581.1 per square mile, of the occupied units 2,680 (52.2%) were owner-occupied and 2,451 (47.8%) were rented. The homeowner vacancy rate was 5.1%; the rental vacancy rate was 4.0%. 10,486 people (41.0% of the population) lived in owner-occupied housing units and 9,339 people (36.6%) lived in rental housing units.

=== People in group quarters ===
- 7,975 people in Wasco State Prison
- 1,226 people in other types of correctional institutions
- 10 people in homes for the mentally ill
- 8 people in other non-institutional group quarters

== Economy ==
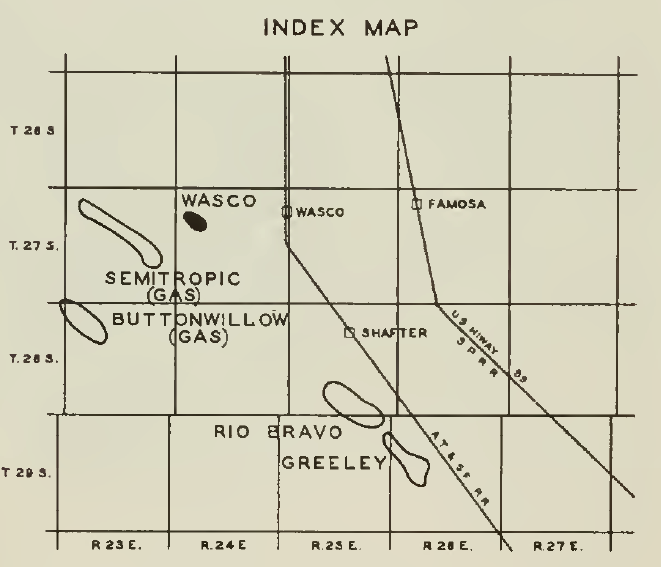
Wasco Oil Field location map

One of Wasco's major economic activities is agriculture, specifically the growing of rose bushes. In 2007 fifty-five percent of all roses grown in the United States were grown in or around Wasco. Two of Wasco's major nurseries closed in 2010, and by 2011 Wasco was producing only approximately forty percent of U.S.-grown roses.

Oil and gas extraction is a significant part of the local economy. The Wasco Oil Field was discovered in April 1938, by Continental Oil Company. The large Semitropic Oil Field is along State Route 46 about 7 miles (11 km) west of town. Formerly a gas field, the region now mainly produces oil. Vintage Production, an arm of Occidental Petroleum, is the primary operator as of 2010.

== Sports ==
The Wasco Reserve (called the Reserves in their 2019 debut season) were a professional baseball team competing in the independent Pecos League which is not affiliated with Major League Baseball or Minor League Baseball. Their home games through the 2021 season were played at Wasco Athletic Park, sharing Bakersfield's Sam Lynn Ballpark for their 2022 final season.

== Transportation ==
The Amtrak service, the Gold Runner, stops at the Wasco station, which has one platform next to the single track; the station building was demolished in 2021. Being on the route of the high speed rail project without a stop, Wasco city officials have expressed concerns that the Amtrak service might be discontinued. As of August 2020, no decision has been announced. The construction has impacted the city and the costs for asbestos removal are in dispute in a labor housing complex that had to be abandoned and demolished. While paid relocation costs, the city can’t afford to demolish the camp and wants the rail authority to pay. Chief Executive Brian Kelly came to the city to discuss the issue in 2021.

== Notable people ==
- Pablo Garza, American mixed martial artist
- Suzanne Lacy, artist, educator and activist
- Aaron Merz, former American football offensive lineman
- Jim Napier, former minor league baseball catcher and manager
- Manuel Quezada, professional boxer
- Carl Smith, American football coach

== In popular culture ==
The town is featured in Episode 133 of California's Gold with Huell Howser, filmed in 2007.

In the movie "Son in Law" featuring comedian Pauly Shore, the opening credit flyover shots and the opening graduation scene, were filmed in Wasco, CA and at the Wasco High School football stadium respectively.

== Gallery ==
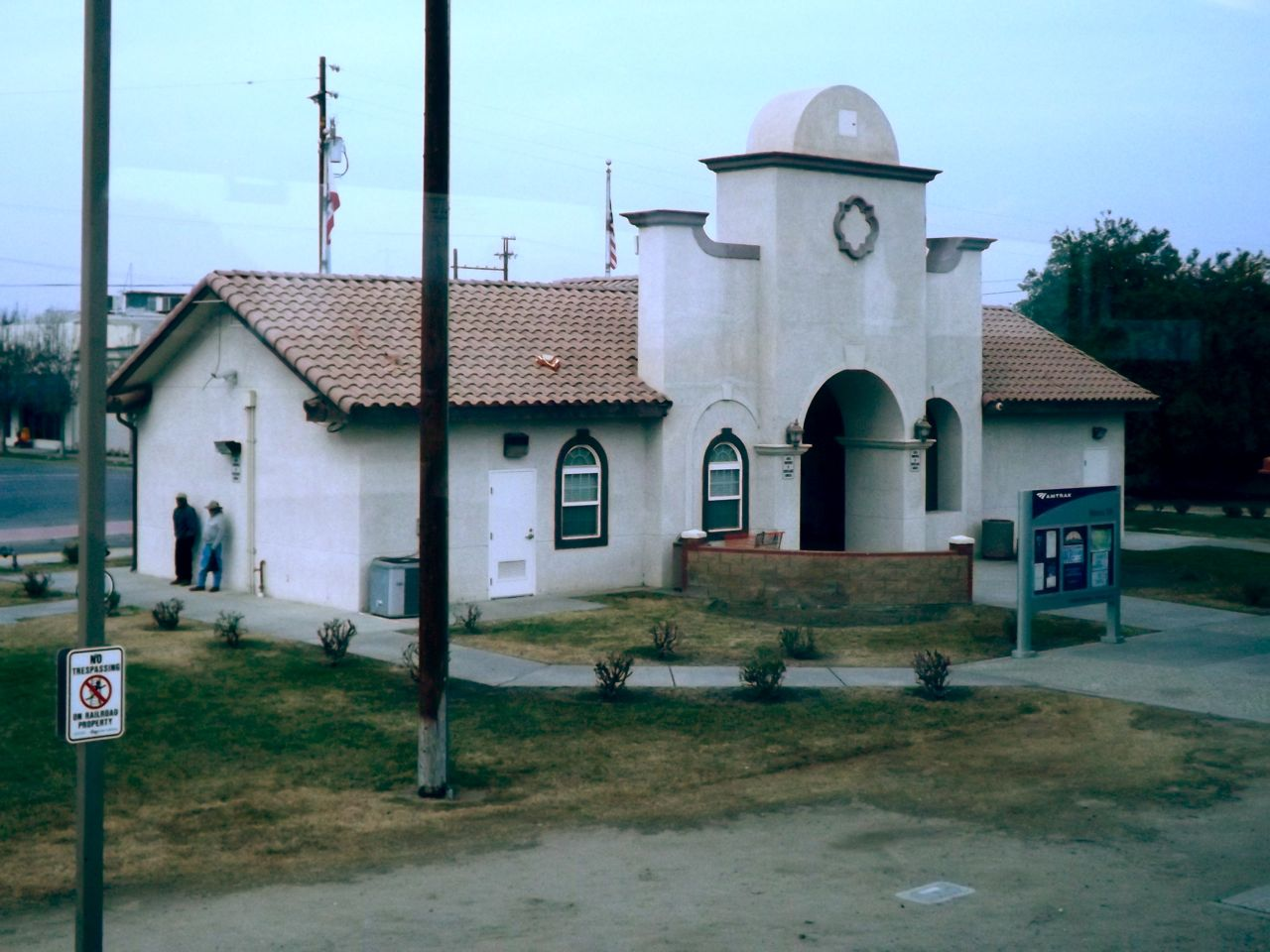
Amtrak station, January 2014

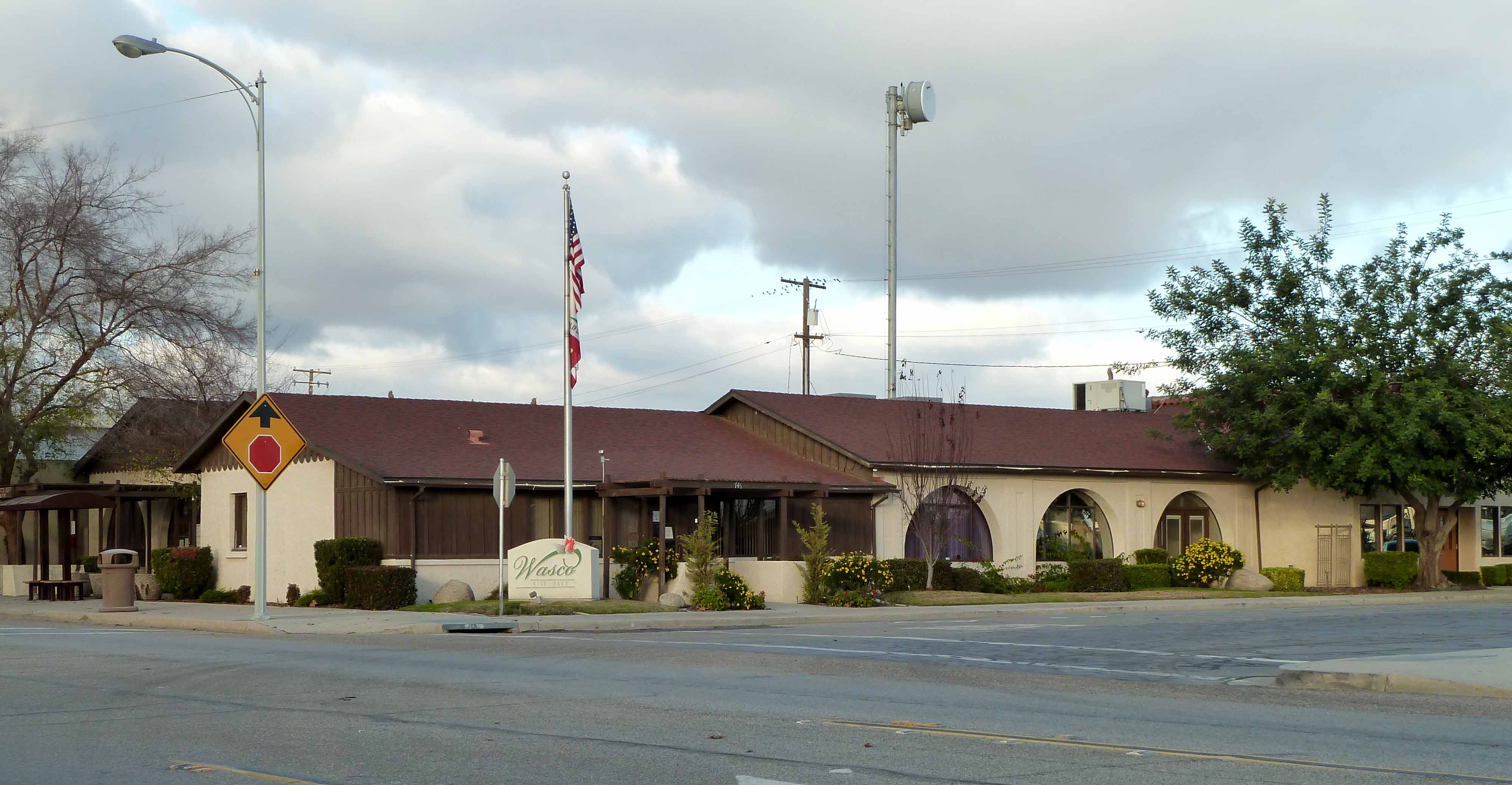
City Hall, December 2010

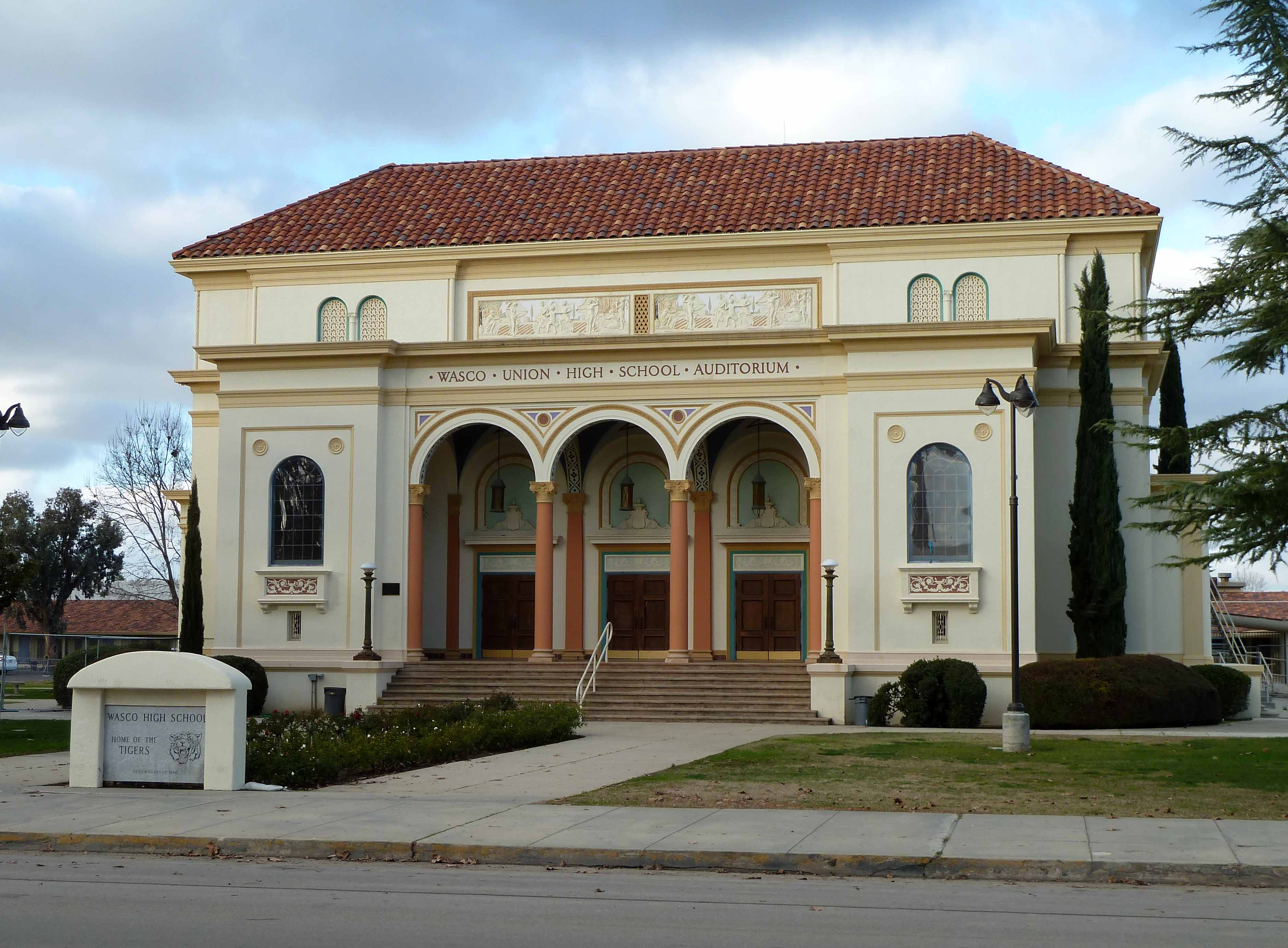
The Wasco Union High School Auditorium is on the National Register of Historic Places.

== See also ==
- Alpaugh, California
- M.V. Hartranft, land developer in Wasco
