= Antelope Shale =

Geologic formation in the San Joaquin Valley of Central California

- Stratigraphic range: Cretaceous
- Type: Formation
- Unit of: Monterey Formation
- Underlies: Etchegoin Formation

Location
- Region: San Joaquin Valley, California
- Country: United States

The Antelope Shale is a geologic formation in the San Joaquin Valley of central California.

It underlies the Pliocene epoch Etchegoin Formation.

It preserves fossils dating back to the Cretaceous period.

== See also ==
- List of fossiliferous stratigraphic units in California
- Paleontology in California
