= Tulare Formation =

Geologic formation in central California, US

- Stratigraphic range: Neogene & Quaternary
- Type: Formation
- Underlies: (is topmost formation)
- Overlies: San Joaquin Formation
- Thickness: up to 4,000 feet (1,200 m)

Location
- Region: San Joaquin Valley, California
- Country: United States

The Tulare Formation (/tʊˈlɛəri/) is a Pliocene to Holocene epoch geologic formation in the central and southern San Joaquin Valley of central California.

== Geology ==
It overlies the San Joaquin Formation, and can be up to 4,000 feet (1,200 m) thick.

Its sediments consist mainly of unconsolidated deposits of clay, silt, sand, and gravel.

=== Fossils ===
Many freshwater fossils are preserved in the formation, dating back to the Neogene and Quaternary Periods of the Cenozoic Era. They include the largest fossil assemblage of clams and snails known on the Pacific Coast.

== See also ==
- Neogene California
- List of fossiliferous stratigraphic units in California
- Paleontology in California
