= San Joaquin Formation =

Pliocene epoch geologic formation

- Stratigraphic range: Neogene
- Type: Geologic formation
- Underlies: Tulare Formation
- Overlies: Etchegoin Formation

Location
- Region: San Joaquin Valley, California
- Country: United States

The San Joaquin Formation is a Pliocene epoch geologic formation in the lower half of the San Joaquin Valley in central California.

== Geology ==
With the underlying Etchegoin Formation, it is associated with the numerous oil fields in the central and southern San Joaquin Valley. It is overlain by the Tulare Formation.

It preserves fossils dating back to the Neogene period of the Cenozoic Era.

== See also ==
- Geology of Kern County, California
- Neogene California
- List of fossiliferous stratigraphic units in California
- Paleontology in California
