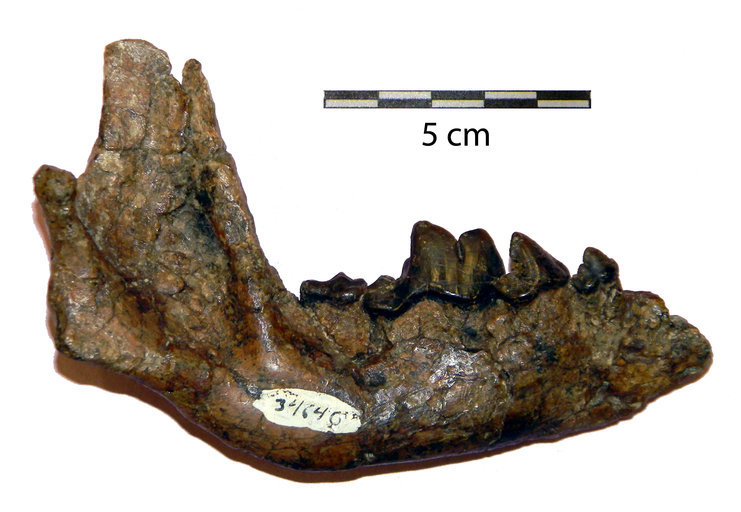

Scientific classification
- Domain: Eukaryota
- Kingdom: Animalia
- Phylum: Chordata
- Class: Mammalia
- Order: Carnivora
- Family: Canidae
- Genus: †Borophagus
- Species: †B. littoralis

Binomial name
- †Borophagus littoralis VanderHoof, 1931

= Borophagus littoralis =

Borophagus littoralis Temporal range: Late Miocene (Clarendonian to Hemphillian), 11.6–9.4 Ma

Extinct species of carnivore

Borophagus littoralis ("coastal glutton") is an extinct species of the genus Borophagus of the subfamily Borophaginae, a group of canids endemic to North America from the Late Miocene from 11.6 to 9.4 Mya. Borophagus littoralis existed for approximately 2.2 million years.

== Overview ==
Borophagus littoralis was named by Cope in 1892 and is considered synonymous with Osteoborus diabloensis. Borophagus littoralis, like other Borophaginae, are loosely known as "bone-crushing" or "hyena-like" dogs. Though not the most massive borophagine by size or weight, it had a more highly evolved capacity to crunch bone than earlier, larger genera such as Epicyon, which seems to be an evolutionary trend of the group (Turner, 2004). During the Pliocene epoch, Borophagus began being displaced by Canis genera such as Canis edwardii and later by Canis dirus. Early species of Borophagus were placed in the genus Osteoborus until recently, but the genera are now considered synonyms. Borophagus littoralis possibly led a hyena-like lifestyle scavenging carcasses of recently dead animals.

== Taxonomy ==
Typical features of this genus are a bulging forehead and powerful jaws; it was probably a scavenger. Its crushing premolar teeth and strong jaw muscles would have been used to crack open bone, much like the hyena of the Old World. The adult animal is estimated to have been about 80 cm in length, similar to a coyote, although it was much more powerfully built.
