= Santa Margarita Formation =

Neogene Period geologic formation in the San Joaquin Valley, California

- Stratigraphic range: Neogene
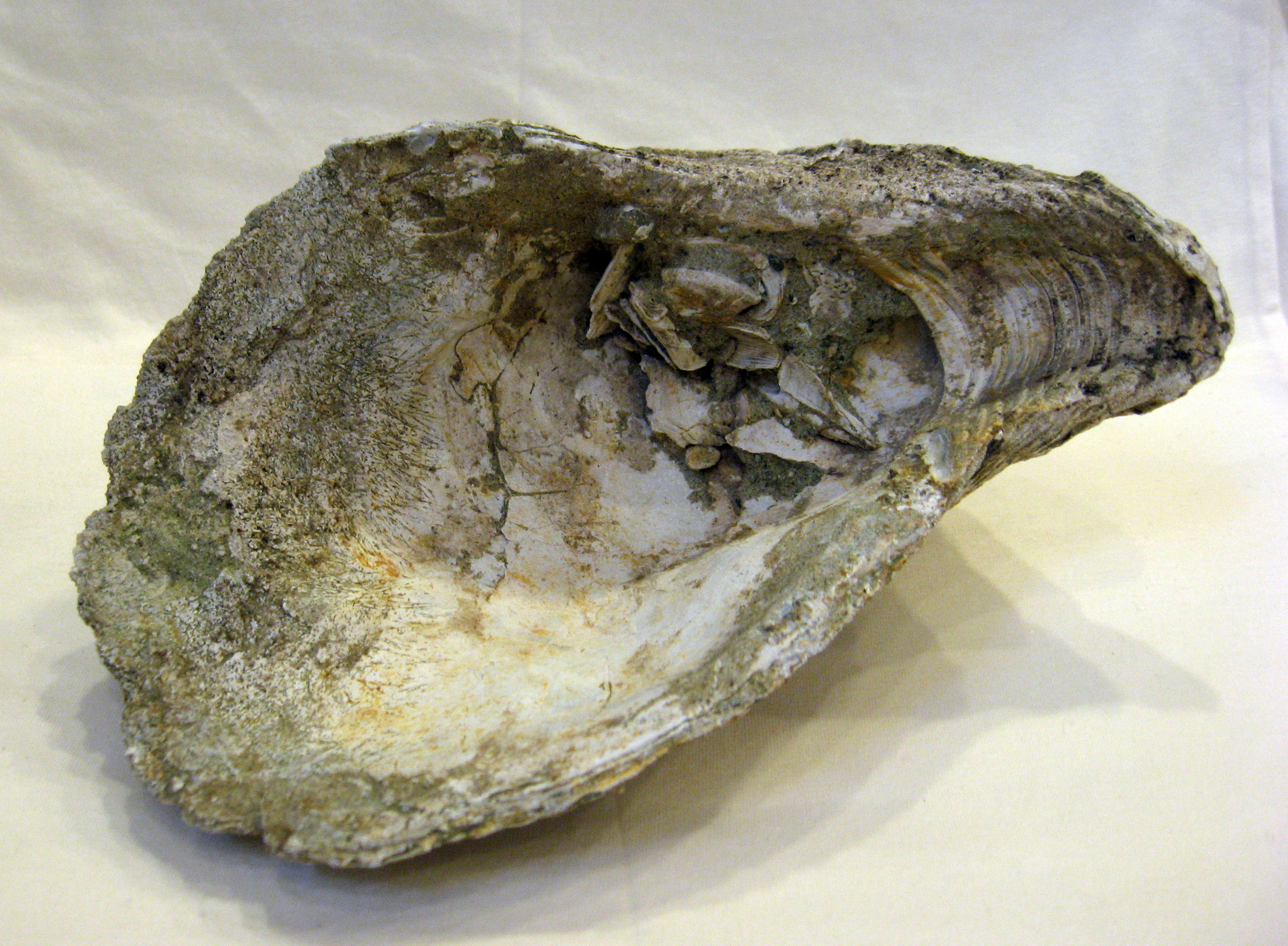
- Fossil from the Santa Margarita Formation
- Type: Formation
- Underlies: Chanac Formation

Location
- Region: San Joaquin Valley, California
- Country: United States

The Santa Margarita Formation is a Neogene Period geologic formation in the San Joaquin Valley of central California.

It preserves fossils dating back to the Miocene epoch.

== See also ==
- List of fossiliferous stratigraphic units in California
- Paleontology in California
- Fossils of Los Angeles
