= Etchegoin Formation =

Pliocene epoch geologic formation in the San Joaquin Valley, California

- Stratigraphic range: Pliocene epoch
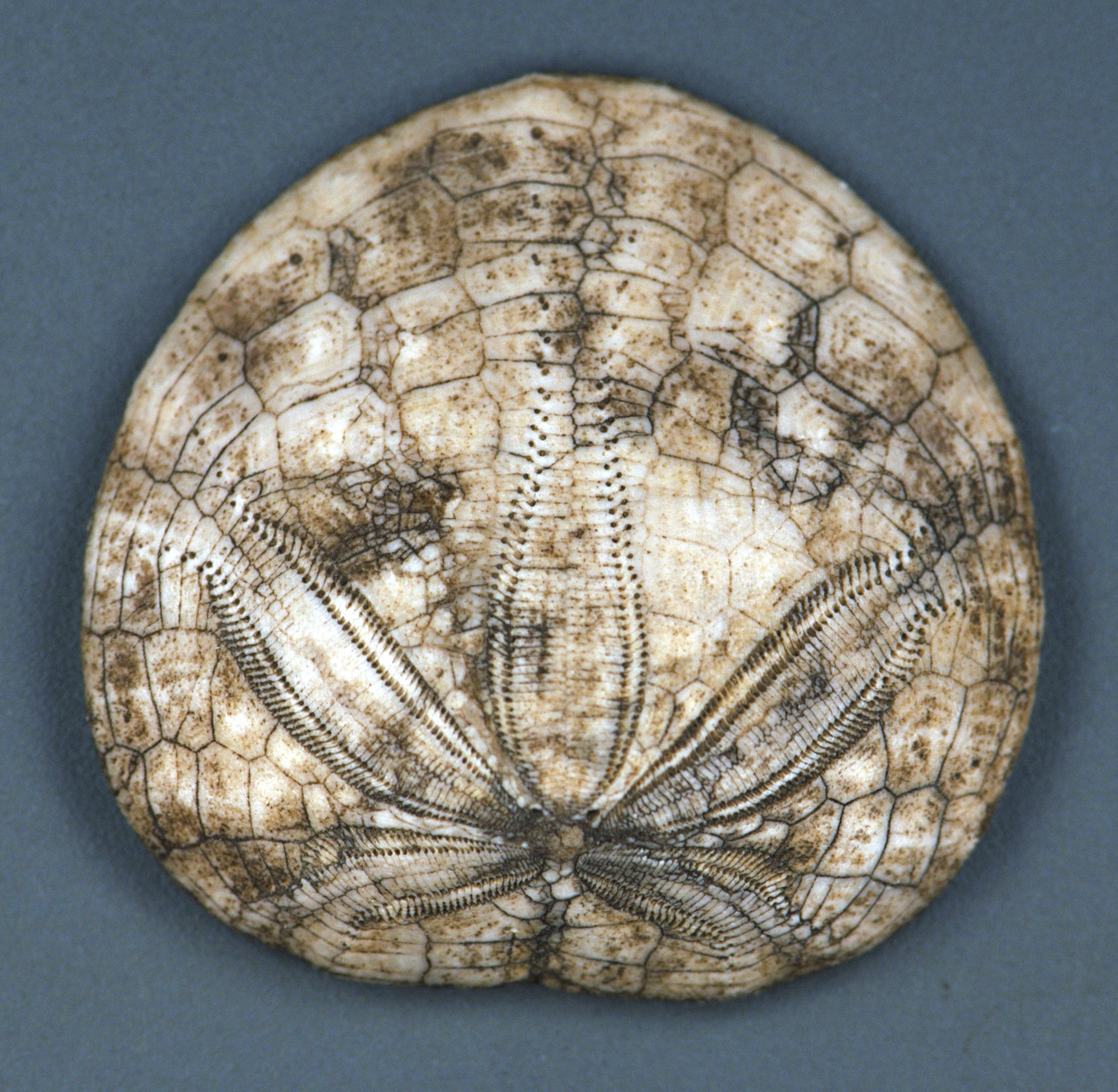
- Fossil from the Etchegoin Formation
- Type: Formation
- Underlies: San Joaquin Formation, Kern River Beds Formation (east)
- Overlies: Antelope Shale of Monterey Formation, Chanac Formation (east)

Location
- Region: San Joaquin Valley, California
- Country: United States

The Etchegoin Formation is a Pliocene epoch geologic formation in the lower half of the San Joaquin Valley in central California.

== Geology ==
The shallow-water marine sandstone formation is found across the central and southern San Joaquin Valley, and with the overlying Pliocene nonmarine sand San Joaquin Formation, is associated with the numerous oil fields there. The White Wolf Fault forms its southern boundary. It overlies the Antelope Shale unit of the Monterey Formation in its central and western sections.

In its southeastern section it is part of the Kern River Series, which is divided into an upper unit named the Kern River Beds Formation, a lower unit named the Chanac Formation, with the wedge of the Etchegoin Formation in the middle.

=== Fossils ===
It preserves numerous fossils dating back to the Neogene Period of the Cenozoic Era, including mollusks.

== See also ==
- Geology of Kern County, California
- Neogene California
- List of fossiliferous stratigraphic units in California
- Paleontology in California
