= List of thalattosuchian-bearing stratigraphic units =

List of thalattosuchian-bearing stratigraphic units, or geologic formations.

== Introduction ==
Thalattosuchia is the name given to a clade of marine crocodylomorphs from the Early, Middle, and Late Jurassic period eras to the Early Cretaceous period era, that had a cosmopolitan distribution.

They are colloquially referred to as 'marine crocodiles' or 'sea crocodiles' though they are not members of Crocodilia.

== List ==
Group or Formation	Period	Country	Notes
Alcobaça Formation	Jurassic	Portugal	
Ancholme Group/Kimmeridge Clay Formation	Jurassic	United Kingdom	
Ancholme Group/Oxford Clay Formation	Jurassic	France, United Kingdom	
Arcillas de Morella Formation	Cretaceous	Spain	
Argiles de Châtillon Formation	Jurassic	France	
Argiles de Montaubert Formation	Jurassic	France	
Asfer Group/Bir Miteur Formation	Jurassic	Tunisia	
Balabansai Formation	Jurassic	Kyrgyzstan	
Bauru Formation	Cretaceous	Brazil	
Calcare di Sogno Formation	Jurassic	Italy	
Calcareous Grit Formation	Jurassic	United Kingdom	
Cazals Formation	Jurassic	France	
Comblanchien Formation	Jurassic	France	
Corallian Oolite Formation	Jurassic	United Kingdom	
Corallian Group/Kingston Formation	Jurassic	United Kingdom	
Cuyo Group/Los Molles Formation	Jurassic	Argentina	
Dalle nacrée Formation	Jurassic	France	
Dorset Succession Group/Kimmeridge Clay Formation	Jurassic	United Kingdom	
El Mers Formation	Jurassic	Morocco	
Forest Marble Formation	Jurassic	United Kingdom	
Frontier Formation	Cretaceous	United States	
Fuller's Earth Formation	Jurassic	United Kingdom	
Great Oolite Formation	Jurassic	France, United Kingdom	
Great Oolite Group/Chipping Norton Limestone Formation	Jurassic	United Kingdom	
Great Oolite Group/Forest Marble Formation	Jurassic	United Kingdom	
Great Oolite Group/Sharp's Hill Formation	Jurassic	United Kingdom	
Great Oolite Group/White Limestone Formation	Jurassic	United Kingdom	
Hastings Beds Group/Wadhurst Clay Formation	Cretaceous	United Kingdom	
Higueruelas Formation	Jurassic	Spain	
Inferior Oolite Group/Chipping Norton Limestone Formation	Jurassic	United Kingdom	
Jagua Formation	Jurassic	Cuba	
Jasna Gora Formation	Jurassic	Poland	
Kandreho Formation	Jurassic	Madagascar	
La Caja Formation	Jurassic	Mexico	
La Casita Formation	Jurassic	Mexico	
Lautaro Formation	Jurassic	Chile	
Lias Group/Beacon Limestone Formation	Jurassic	United Kingdom	
Liegende Bankkalk Formation	Jurassic	Germany	
Los Molles Formation	Jurassic	Argentina	
Lower Greensand Group/Faringdon Sand Formation	Cretaceous	United Kingdom	
Marnes a Gryphées virgules d'Issoncourt Formation	Jurassic	France	
Marnes de Dives Formation	Jurassic	France	
Marnes à Deltoideum delta Formation	Jurassic	France	
Mergelstätten Formation	Jurassic	Germany	
Mina Chica Formation	Jurassic	Chile	
MontFormation	Jurassic	France	
Mörnsheim Formation	Jurassic	Germany	
Nusplingen Limestone Formation	Jurassic	Germany	
Painten Formation	Jurassic	Germany	
Pimienta Formation	Jurassic	Mexico	
Portland Group/Portland Stone Formation	Jurassic	United Kingdom	
Posidonia Shale Formation	Jurassic	Germany	
Quehuita Formation	Jurassic	Chile	
Raetschenbank Formation	Jurassic	Switzerland	
Reuchenette Formation	Jurassic	Switzerland	
Rosso Ammonitico Veronese Formation	Jurassic	Italy	
Rögling Formation	Jurassic	Germany	
Sables de Glos Formation	Jurassic	France	
Sierra El Cobre Formation	Jurassic	Chile	
Solnhofen Formation	Jurassic	Germany	
Solnhofen Platenkalk Formation	Jurassic	Germany	
Taunton Limestone Formation	Jurassic	United Kingdom	
Techout Formation	Jurassic	Tunisia	
Terenes Formation	Jurassic	Spain	
Tzeliuching Formation	Cretaceous	China	
Upper Great oolite Formation	Jurassic	France	
Vaca Muerta Formation	Cretaceous, Jurassic	Argentina	
Wadi Milk Formation	Cretaceous	Sudan	
Weberg	Jurassic	United States	
Whitby Mudstone Formation	Jurassic	United Kingdom	
Ziliujing	Jurassic	China	
Ágreda	Jurassic	Spain	
