= List of fossiliferous stratigraphic units in France =

Group or Formation	Period	Notes
A2 Group	Cretaceous	
Agenais Limestone	Neogene	
Ancholme Group/Oxford Clay Formation	Jurassic	
Andouille Formation	Ordovician	
Angouleme Formation	Cretaceous	
Aravis Formation	Cretaceous	
Ardengost Formation	Carboniferous	
Argile a lignite d'Epernay	Paleogene	
Argile de Villerville	Jurassic	
Argile Ostréenne	Cretaceous	
Argile à Plicatules	Cretaceous	
Argiles a Lopha gregarea	Jurassic	
Argiles d'lignite du Soissonnais	Paleogene	
Argiles d'Octeville	Jurassic	
Argiles de Châtillon	Jurassic	
Argiles de Montaubert	Jurassic	
Argiles et Grés à Reptiles	Cretaceous	
Argovian Formation	Jurassic	
Armorique Formation	Devonian	
Assise de Kusel	Permian	
Assise de Lebach	Permian	
Assise de Millery	Permian	
Assise de Muse	Permian	
B3 Group/C1 Formation	Cretaceous	
Baculites Limestone	Cretaceous	
banc roux Formation	Jurassic	
Bargy Conglomerate	Cretaceous	
Barre a Orbitolines Formation	Cretaceous	
Bath Oolite Formation	Jurassic	
Beaulieu Formation	Devonian	
Beaumont et d'Herquemoulin Formation	Ordovician	
Ben An Arreun Formation	Devonian	
Bert Formation	Permian	
Beulieu Formation	Devonian	
Bissounel Formation	Devonian	
Blacourt Formation	Devonian	
Bois Formation	Paleogene	
Bois Formation	Devonian	
Bolast Formation	Devonian	
Bourg Formation	Cretaceous	
Braunjura Group / Braunjura alpha & Braunjura beta Formation	Jurassic	
Brian de Vere Formation	Jurassic	
Bunter Sandstone Formation	Jurassic	
Bédat Formation	Cretaceous	
Cala di Labra Formation	Neogene	
Calcaire a Asteries	Paleogene	
Calcaire a gryphees	Jurassic	
Calcaire a oolithes ferrugineuses	Jurassic	
Calcaire d'Ecouché	Jurassic	
Calcaire de Blacourt	Devonian	
Calcaire de Caen	Jurassic	
Calcaire de Ferques	Devonian	
Calcaire de Fontanil	Cretaceous	
Calcaire de Hennequeville	Jurassic	
Calcaire de Rognac	Cretaceous	
Calcaire de Saint	Paleogene	
Calcaire de Valognes	Jurassic	
Calcaire de Vigny	Paleogene	
Calcaire d’Erbray	Devonian	
Calcaire grosse	Paleogene	
Calcaire Grossier d'Etrechy	Paleogene	
Calcaire marneux inferieurs	Jurassic	
Calcaire marno	Jurassic	
Calcaire Nankin	Cretaceous	
Calcaire pseudo	Jurassic	
Calcaire spathique	Jurassic	
Calcaire à Bélemnites	Jurassic	
Calcaire à entroques	Triassic	
Calcaire à polypier de Frotey	Jurassic	
Calcaire à Spatangues	Cretaceous	
Calcaires a Asteries	Paleogene	
Calcaires a gryphees	Jurassic	
Calcaires a Gryphees	Jurassic	
Calcaires argileux de Bonnevaux	Jurassic	
Calcaires construits de Molinges	Jurassic	
Calcaires de Caen	Jurassic	
Calcaires de Fiz	Cretaceous	
Calcaires de Moulin	Jurassic	
Calcaires de Vacheres	Paleogene	
Calcaires de Valfin	Jurassic	
Calcaires des Fiz	Cretaceous	
Calcaires et Argiles de Vignevielle	Cretaceous	
Calcaires et marnes schisteuses	Ordovician	
Calcaires ferrugineux	Jurassic	
Calcaires Lites	Jurassic	
Calcaires lithographiques de Vachères	Paleogene	
Calcaires marneux inferieur	Jurassic	
Calcaires marno	Jurassic	
Calcaires noduleux cendres	Jurassic	
Calcaires pseudo	Jurassic	
Calcaires roux	Jurassic	
Calcaires siliceux de Dole	Jurassic	
Calcaires tachetés	Jurassic	
Calcaires à Baculites	Cretaceous	
Calcaires à chailles	Jurassic	
Calcaires à Entroques	Jurassic	
Calcaires à Spatangues	Cretaceous	
Calcaires à stipites	Jurassic	
Calcares marins à alvéolines	Paleogene	
Calschistes de la bande ouest du Morvan	Carboniferous	
Campanien 1	Cretaceous	
Caporalino Limestone	Jurassic	
Carboniferous Limestone Formation	Carboniferous	
Cazals Formation	Jurassic	
Cernay Formation	Paleogene	
Charmouthien Formation	Jurassic	
Chay Formation	Jurassic	
Châlons Formation	Paleogene	
Cian Formation	Permian	
Clapassous Formation	Devonian	
Comblanchien Formation	Jurassic	
Commentry Shales Formation	Carboniferous	
Conglomerat a Pierrefitte	Paleogene	
Conglomerat de Pierrefitte	Paleogene	
Conglomérat de Bargy	Cretaceous	
Conglomérat de Cernay	Paleogene	
Conglomérats de Bargy	Cretaceous	
Coral Rag de Trouville	Jurassic	
Couche superieur a Orbitolines	Cretaceous	
Couche à Planulites koenigi	Jurassic	
Couches de Balme	Cretaceous	
Couches de Barroubio	Ordovician	
Couches de Birmensdorf	Jurassic	
Couches de Chailley	Jurassic	
Couches de la Cluse de L'Orb	Ordovician	
Couches de la Maurerie	Ordovician	
Couches de la Maurerie, Schistes de Setso	Ordovician	
Couches du Chailley	Jurassic	
Couches du Foulon	Ordovician	
Couches du Freu	Cretaceous	
Couches à Spérites	Jurassic	
Coumiac Formation	Devonian	
Craie blanche	Cretaceous	
Craie d'Antifer	Cretaceous	
Craie d'Eletot	Cretaceous	
Craie de Meudon	Cretaceous	
Craie de Rouen	Cretaceous	
Craie de Sens	Cretaceous	
Craie de Valognes	Cretaceous	
Craie de Veulette	Cretaceous	
Craie de Villedieu	Cretaceous	
Craie du Cap Fagnet	Cretaceous	
Craie glauconieuse	Cretaceous	
Craie tufau	Cretaceous	
Craie à I. labiatus	Cretaceous	
Creully Limestone	Jurassic	
Croûte ferrugineuse	Jurassic	
d'Avezac Formation	Cretaceous	
d'Urville Formation	Ordovician	
Dalle nacrée Formation	Jurassic	
Dalles à Bryozoaires Formation	Jurassic	
Dolomie de Fiennes	Devonian	
Falun d'Auvers	Paleogene	
Falun d'Ormoy	Paleogene	
Falun de Jeurs	Paleogene	
Falun de Morigny	Paleogene	
Falun de Pierrefitte	Paleogene	
Fayette Formation	Paleogene	
Fc Formation	Cretaceous	
Ferques Formation	Devonian	
Figuieres Formation	Cretaceous	
Gahard Formation	Silurian	
Gault Clay Formation	Cretaceous	
Goasquellou Formation	Devonian	
Gour Formation	Cretaceous	
Grand Auverne Formation	Ordovician	
Great Oolite Formation	Jurassic	
Great Oolite Formation	Jurassic	
Gres a Homalonotus bonnisenti Group / Gres du Mont de Besneville Formation	Ordovician	
Gres a Meules	Triassic	
Gres a Orthis monnieri	Devonian	
Gres a Voltzia	Triassic	
Gres Armoricain	Ordovician	
Gres Armoricain Superieur	Ordovician	
Gres de Carriers	Devonian	
Gres de May	Ordovician	
Gres de Sanite Godeleine	Devonian	
Gres du Caradocien	Ordovician	
Gres du Glauzy	Ordovician	
Grès verts hevétiques	Cretaceous	
Gres à Avicula contorta	Triassic	
Greseuse Formation	Ordovician	
Grès armoricain	Jurassic	
Grès d'Alet	Cretaceous	
Grès d'Antully	Triassic	
Grès de Boisset	Triassic	
Grès de Infralias	Triassic	
Grès de la Crèche inférieurs	Jurassic	
Grès de Labarre	Cretaceous	
Grès des Estous	Cretaceous	
Grès et sables piquetés	Cretaceous	
Grès inférieurs	Triassic	
Grès supérieurs et Argiles associés	Triassic	
Grès verts Dauphinois	Cretaceous	
Grès verts hevétiques	Cretaceous	
Grès verts hevétiques	Cretaceous	
Grès verts hevétiques	Cretaceous	
Grès à Reptiles	Cretaceous	
Grès à Voltzia	Triassic	
Guépelle Formation	Paleogene	
Gypsum des Camoins	Paleogene	
Hannut Formation	Paleogene	
Haybes Formation	Devonian	
Hontarède Formation	Cretaceous	
Horizon a Miquelinia migueli Formation	Ordovician	
Humeralis Mergel Formation	Jurassic	
Humeralis Schichten Formation	Jurassic	
Indusial Limestone	Neogene	
Inferieur Schistes du Landeyran	Ordovician	
Inferior Oolite Formation	Jurassic	
Japhet Formation	Devonian	
Kerbelec Formation	Devonian	
Kerdreolet Formation	Devonian	
Kerdréolet Formation	Devonian	
Kergarvan Formation	Devonian	
Kermeur Formation	Ordovician	
Kermeur Sandstone	Ordovician	
Kersadiou Formation	Devonian	
Keuper Formation	Triassic	
Kimmeridge Clay Formation	Jurassic	
l'Armorique Formation	Devonian	
L'Izarne Formation	Devonian	
La Cadiere d'Azur Formation	Cretaceous	
La Lande Muree Formation	Silurian	
La Penthiève Beds	Cretaceous	
La Tonnelle Formation	Cretaceous	
Lacave Formation	Cretaceous	
Landevennec Formation	Devonian	
Lanvoy Formation	Devonian	
Lastours Formation	Cambrian	
Le Fret Formation	Devonian	
Les Vignes Formation	Cretaceous	
Lestaillats Marls	Cretaceous	
Lias Formation	Jurassic	
Lievin Formation	Devonian	
Lievin Group/Noulette Formation	Devonian, Silurian	
Lignites de Soissonais Formation	Paleogene	
Lithographic limestones Formation	Jurassic	
Llandeilan (Morgat?) schistes Formation	Ordovician	
Llandeilan? Formation	Ordovician	
Lower Chalk Formation	Cretaceous	
Lumachelle à Ostrea acuminata Formation	Jurassic	
Lydienne Formation	Carboniferous	
Lydiennes Formation	Carboniferous	
Mans Sandstone	Cretaceous	
Marl Formation	Paleogene	
Marne de Flize Formation	Jurassic	
Marnes a Gryphées virgules d'Issoncourt	Jurassic	
Marnes bleues	Cretaceous	
Marnes brunes	Jurassic	
Marnes d'Auzas	Cretaceous	
Marnes de Bléville	Jurassic	
Marnes de Châlins	Triassic	
Marnes de Dives	Jurassic	
Marnes de Dormans	Paleogene	
Marnes de Foncouverte	Paleogene	
Marnes de Fontaine	Cretaceous	
Marnes de Gan	Paleogene	
Marnes de Gravelotte (=La Gravclotte Marls)	Jurassic	
Marnes de la Maurine	Cretaceous	
Marnes de Latrecey	Jurassic	
Marnes de plage	Cretaceous	
Marnes de Villers	Jurassic	
Marnes du Chevain	Jurassic	
Marnes grumeleuses	Jurassic	
Marnes irisées supérieures	Triassic	
Marnes jaunes	Jurassic	
Marnes Rouges de Roquelongue	Cretaceous	
Marnes Rouges Inférieures	Cretaceous	
Marnes vertes	Cretaceous	
Marnes à Belemnopsis latesulcatus	Jurassic	
Marnes à bryozoaires	Cretaceous	
Marnes à Deltoideum delta	Jurassic	
Marnes à Digonella divionensis	Jurassic	
Marnes à Digonella marcoui	Jurassic	
Marnos Formation	Cretaceous	
Menat Formation	Paleogene	
Meudon Formation	Paleogene	
Molasse calcaire et sablo	Neogene	
Molasse Coquilliere	Neogene	
Mont Aime Formation	Paleogene	
Mont Peyroux Formation	Devonian	
Mont Ventoux Formation	Cretaceous	
Montagne Noire Group / Lydiennes Formation	Carboniferous	
Monteils Formation	Paleogene	
Moon-Airel Formation	Triassic	
Morgiou Formation	Cretaceous	
Muschelkalk Group / Muschelkalk Formation	Triassic	
Nay Marls Formation	Cretaceous	
Nehou Formation	Devonian	
Nevremont Formation	Devonian	
Niveau du gypse d'Aix Formation	Paleogene	
Nivel E Formation	Cambrian	
Oolite Blanche	Jurassic	
Oolith miliaire	Jurassic	
Oolithe corallienne de Pagnoz	Jurassic	
Oolithe de Trouville	Jurassic	
Oolithe miliaire	Jurassic	
Parnac and Saint Formation	Jurassic	
Pen An Ero Formation	Devonian	
Petite Formation	Carboniferous	
Pierre Blanche de Langrune	Jurassic	
Pierre jaune	Cretaceous	
Pissot Formation	Ordovician	
Plougastel Formation	Silurian	
Podestat Formation	Cretaceous	
Pont Formation	Ordovician	
Porsguen Formation	Devonian	
Portland Formation	Jurassic	
Postolonnec Formation	Ordovician	
Poudingue de Vihiers	Cambrian	
Poudingue Ferrugineux	Cretaceous	
Pradineaux Formation	Permian	
Prapont Formation	Jurassic	
Prioldy Formation	Devonian	
Purbeck Formation	Cretaceous	
Quartzites et Poudingues de Trémentines	Cambrian	
Quelern Formation	Devonian	
Quercy Phosphorites Formation	Paleogene	
Ravin de Ratavoux Formation	Neogene	
Redonien Formation	Neogene	
Renggeri Formation	Jurassic	
Reun Ar C'Hrank Formation	Devonian	
Roc de Murviel Formation	Carboniferous	
Rognacian Formation	Cretaceous	
Roque Redonde Formation	Carboniferous	
Rostiviec Formation	Devonian	
Sable de Vauroux	Paleogene	
Sables de Cherré	Jurassic	
Sables de Glos	Jurassic	
Sables de Varennes	Cretaceous	
Sables du Lamnay	Cretaceous	
Sables du Perche	Cretaceous	
Sables et grès du Mans	Cretaceous	
Sables verts de l'Aube	Cretaceous	
Sables à Mactres	Neogene	
Sablé Formation	Carboniferous	
Sains Formation	Devonian	
Saint Céneré Formation	Devonian	
Saint Cirac Formation	Cretaceous	
Saint Fiacre Formation	Devonian	
Salagou Formation	Permian	
Salt Formation	Paleogene	
Schistes a nodules	Ordovician	
Schistes a nodules d'Angers	Ordovician	
Schistes d'Angers	Ordovician	
Schistes de Beaulieu	Devonian	
Schistes de Buxières	Permian	
Schistes de Fiennes	Devonian	
Schistes de Kerloc'h	Ordovician	
Schistes de Saint	Ordovician	
Schistes du Courijou	Ordovician	
Shale of Chateau Saint	Neogene	
St. Joseph Formation	Devonian	
Sulzbach Formation	Carboniferous	
Superieur Schistes du Landeyran	Ordovician	
Terres Noires Formation	Jurassic	
Tessé Sandstones	Jurassic	
Theligny Chalk	Cretaceous	
Tibidy Formation	Devonian	
Traonliors Formation	Devonian	
Traveusot Group / Schistes a nodules (Calymenes) Formation	Ordovician	
Troaon Group/Kersadiou Formation	Devonian	
Troaon Group/Tibidy Formation	Devonian	
Tuffeau de St Omer	Paleogene	
Tuffeau jaune de Touraine	Cretaceous	
Tufs et calcaires de Rosan	Ordovician	
Great oolite Formation	Jurassic	
Marnes blue Formation	Cretaceous	
Urgonian Formation	Cretaceous	
Urgonian Limestone Formation	Cretaceous	
Urgonien blanc	Cretaceous	
Urgonien jaune	Cretaceous	
Val d'Homs Formation	Cambrian	
Vauville Formation	Ordovician	
Verveur Formation	Devonian	
Vions Formation	Cretaceous	
Voltzia Sandstone	Triassic	
White Chalk Formation	Cretaceous	
Zorn Formation	Devonian	

== See also ==
- Lists of fossiliferous stratigraphic units in Europe
