= List of fossiliferous stratigraphic units in Switzerland =

Group or Formation	Period	Notes
Allgäu Formation	Jurassic	
Argovian Formation	Jurassic	
Badener Formation	Jurassic	
Badnerschichten Formation	Jurassic	
Besano Formation	Triassic	
Broccatello Formation	Jurassic	
Calcaires de Fiz Formation	Cretaceous	
Couche de Villers Formation	Cretaceous	
Effinger Schichten Formation	Jurassic	
Effingerschichten Formation	Jurassic	
Gansingen Dolomite Formation	Triassic	
Grès verts helvétiques Formation	Cretaceous	
Günsberg Formation	Jurassic	
Hauptrogenstein Formation	Jurassic	
Insektenmergel Formation	Jurassic	
Keuper Formation	Triassic	
Kössen Formation	Triassic	
Löwenstein Formation	Triassic	
Marbre Batard Formation	Cretaceous	
Marnes d'Arzier Formation	Cretaceous	
Marnes d'Uttins Formation	Cretaceous	
Mergel and Kalk Zone Formation	Cretaceous	
Mergel and Knollenmergel zone Formation	Cretaceous	
Meride Formation	Triassic	
Meride Limestone Formation	Triassic	
Middle Keuper Group/Knollenmergel Formation	Triassic	
Monte San Giorgio bituminous shales Formation	Triassic	
Muschelkalk Formation	Triassic	
Mytilus Beds Formation	Jurassic	
Neuewelt Formation	Triassic	
Opalinus Clay Formation	Jurassic	
Pierre Formation	Cretaceous	
Posidonia Shale	Jurassic	
Prosanto Formation	Triassic	
Raetschenbank Formation	Jurassic	
Renggeri Formation	Jurassic	
Reuchenette Formation	Jurassic	
Rosso ad Aptici Formation	Jurassic	
Rämsi Breccia Formation	Jurassic	
Schrattenkalk Formation	Cretaceous	
St. Ursanne Formation	Jurassic	
Staffelegg Formation	Jurassic	
Stuttgart Formation	Triassic	
Trossingen Formation	Triassic	
Twannbach Formation	Jurassic	
Unterer Hauptraugenstein Formation	Jurassic	
Upper Buntsandstein Group/? Plattensandstein Formation	Triassic	
Upper Marine Molasse Formation	Neogene	
Urgonien jaune Formation	Cretaceous	
Variansschichten Formation	Jurassic	
Vellerat Formation	Jurassic	
Villigen Formation	Jurassic	
Virgulien superieur Formation	Jurassic	
Zone de Pierre jaune Formation	Cretaceous	

== See also ==
- Lists of fossiliferous stratigraphic units in Europe
