= Tesse (disambiguation) =

Tesse may refer to:

== People ==
- Madame de Tessé, a French salon holder and letter writer
- Manuela Tesse, an Italian footballer
- René de Froulay de Tessé, a French soldier and diplomat during the reign of Louis XIV

== Places ==
- Tesse, a lake in Lom municipality in Innlandet county, Norway
- Tessé-Froulay, a commune in the Orne department in northwestern France

== Other ==
- Tessé Sandstones, a geologic formation in France
