= Quélern (disambiguation) =

Quélern is a hamlet in western France.

Quélern may also refer to:

- Quelern Formation, is a geologic formation in France.
- Fort Quélern, is a castle in France.
