= Aberia =

Aberia may refer to:

- Aberia (brachiopod), a genus of animals in the family Rhactorthidae
- Aberia (plant), a genus of plants in the family Salicaceae
