= Mergel =

Mergel may refer to:

- Humeralis Mergel Formation, geologic formation in France
- Ines Mergel, German public administration researcher
- Obere Bunte Mergel, geological formation in Switzerland
