= Bédat =

Bédat or Bedat may refer to:

- Arnaud Bédat (1965–2023), Swiss journalist
- Bedat & Co, Swiss watch brand
- Bédat Formation, French geologic formation
