= Tenjong Dendang Formation =

Malaysian geologic formation

- Stratigraphic range: Hirnantian; ~446–444 Ma
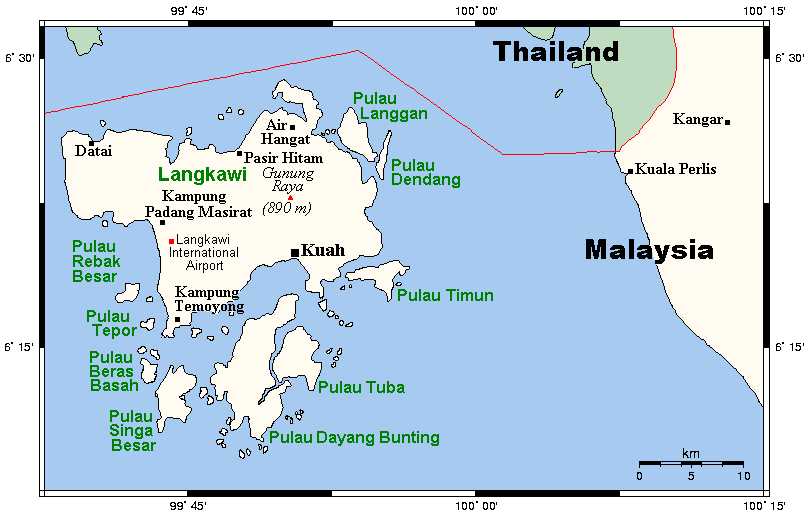
- Map of Langkawi, the formation is found on the island in the northeast; Langgan
- Type: Formation

Lithology
- Primary: Limestone
- Other: Shale

Location
- Coordinates: 6.4°N 99.9°E
- Approximate paleocoordinates: 23.7°N 133.0°E
- Region: Langgan, Kuah, Langkawi
- Country: Malaysia

Type section
- Named for: Tanjong Dendang point
- Tenjong Dendang Formation (Malaysia) Tenjong Dendang Formation (Kedah)

The Tenjong Dendang Formation is a geologic formation in Malaysia. The band of graptolite- and trilobite-bearing shales interbedded in limestones preserves graptolite, brachiopod and trilobite fossils dating back to the Hirnantian stage of the Late Ordovician period. The sediments were deposited during the Late Ordovician glaciation.

== Fossil content ==
The following fossils were reported from the formation:

=== Trilobites ===
- Mucronaspis mucronata
- ?Stenopareia sp.

=== Hyolitha ===
- Hyolithida indet.

=== Strophomenata ===
- Plectambonitoidea indet.

=== Gastropods ===
- Lophospira sp.
- ?Megalomphala sp.

=== Pterobranchia ===
- Climacograptus sp.

== See also ==
- Soom Shale, Hirnantian fossiliferous formation of South Africa
- Tufs et calcaires de Rosan, Hirnantian fossiliferous formation of France
- Cancañiri Formation, Hirnantian fossiliferous formation of Bolivia
