= St David's Church, Abergwili =

Church in Carmarthenshire, Wales

Coordinates: 51°51′52″N 4°16′02″W

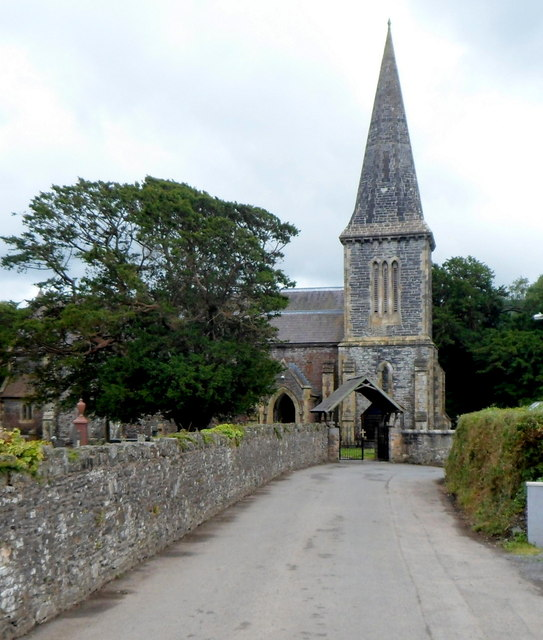
Church spire, Abergwili (geograph 3082439).jpg

St David's Church is a Church in Wales parish church in Abergwili, Carmarthenshire, Wales.

The church was built in the early 1840s when the Rev. Joshua Hughes (later Bishop of St Asaph) was vicar, and was near to the location of a much earlier church, also called St. David's, said to date from the medieval period. It is sited close to Carmarthen Museum, in the former palace of the Bishop of St. Davids.

The nineteenth century church was built from the designs of architect Charles Nelson, with construction beginning in 1840. The walls were built with limestone rubble and the tower was constructed using oolite sedimentary rock for the pyramidal broach spire. Local tradition claims that finial on the spire was cut from one of the stone supports of the cross which stood near the entrance to the old Friary in Lammas Street, in the nearby town of Carmarthen, and that it had been attached to the stake where the Protestant Bishop Robert Ferrar was martyred, burnt to death on 30 March 1555, a victim of the Marian persecutions during the reign of Queen Mary I. It was believed that the stone had lain for years in the yard of a local pub, before it was retrieved by historian Connop Thirlwall when he was Bishop of St Davids, and cut to be the finial.

The new church was consecrated in 1843. The cost was £1,400. The church is now listed as Grade II.

Bishop Richard Davies, who translated parts of the Bible into Welsh in the sixteenth century, was buried at the original church following his death in 1581. In October 1849, a memorial to Davies was unveiled, portraying him seated at a table, at work translating the scripture. A sermon, in Welsh, was delivered by John Jones (Ioan Tegid), vicar of Nevern.

As of 2023, St David's is part of the Bro Caerfyrddin deanery, which consists of eleven churches and is served by four priests.
