= Grand-Auverné Formation =

Geological formation in France

Grand Auverné Formation
- Stratigraphic range: Darriwilian-Sandbian (Dobrotivian); ~461–457.5 Ma
- Type: Formation
- Sub-units: Schistes d'Angers Member

Lithology
- Primary: Organic shale
- Other: Sand and pyrite

Location
- Coordinates: 47.0°N 1.0°W
- Approximate paleocoordinates: 68.2°S 76.0°E
- Region: Maine-et-Loire
- Country: France
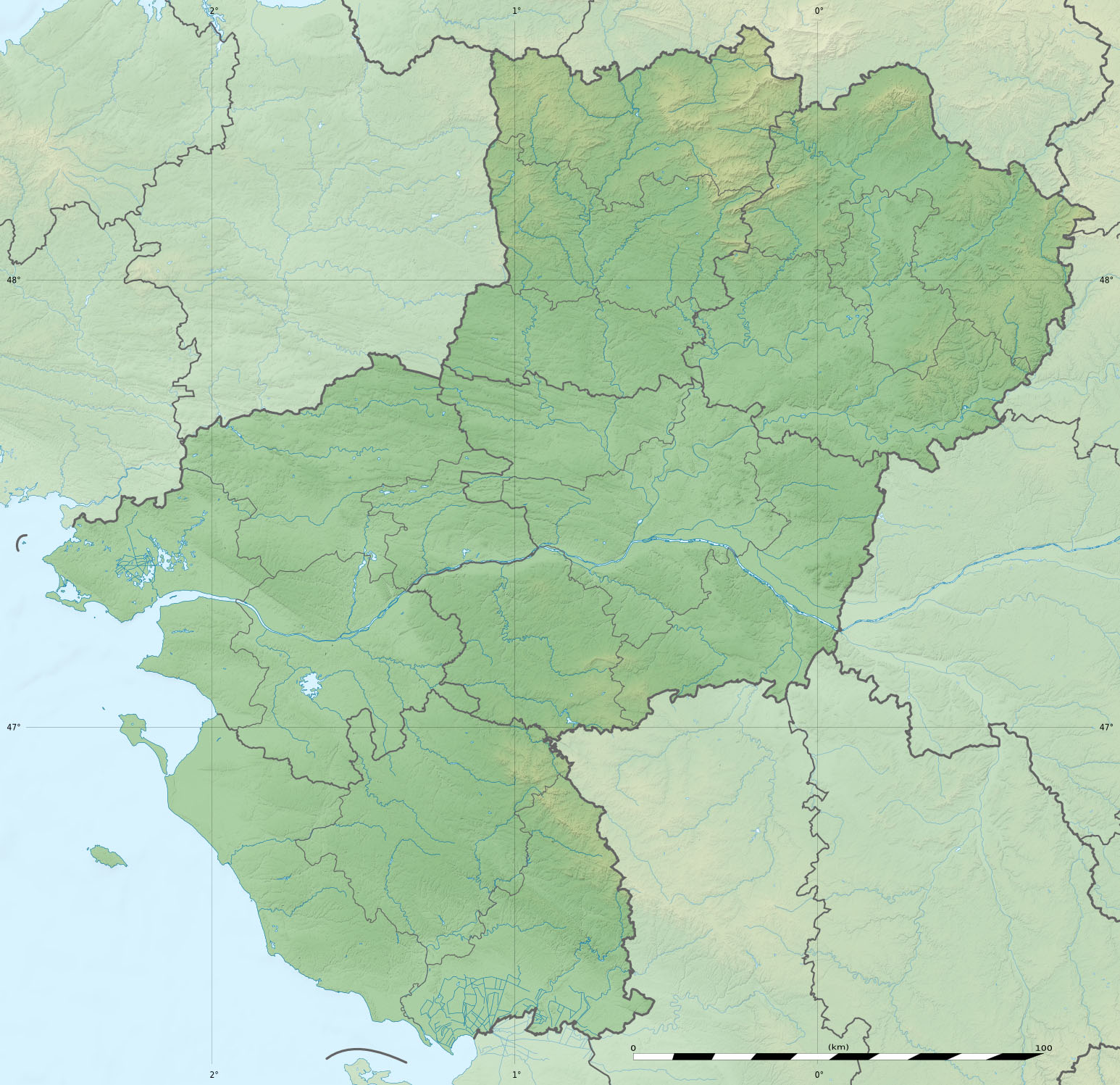
- Grand-Auverné Formation (France) Grand-Auverné Formation (Pays de la Loire)

The Grand Auverné Formation is a geologic formation in France. It preserves fossils dating back to the Darriwilian to Sandbian (Dobrotivian in the regional stratigraphy) stages of the Ordovician period.

== Description ==
The formation comprises dark shales with fine laminations, fossiliferous nodules, and occasional lenticles, bioturbation, sand and pyrite.

== Fossil content ==
The following fossils were reported from the formation:

=== Trilobites ===
- Basilicus sp.
- Bumastus sp.
- Colpocoryphe sp.
- Dionide sp.
- Eccoptochile sp.
- Ectillaenus sp.
- Eodalmanitina sp.
- Neseuretus sp.
- Nobiliasaphus sp.
- Ogygites sp.
- Pateraspis sp.
- Placoparia sp.
- Prionocheilus sp.
- Salterocoryphe sp.
- Selenopeltis sp.
- Uralichas sp.
- Zeliszkella sp.
- ?Onnia sp.

=== Graptoloidea ===
- Didymograptus sp.

== See also ==
- List of fossiliferous stratigraphic units in France
