= Vauville Formation =

Geological formation in France

- Stratigraphic range: Ordovician
- Type: Formation

Location
- Country: France

The Vauville Formation is a geologic formation in France. It preserves fossils dating back to the Ordovician period.

== See also ==
- List of fossiliferous stratigraphic units in France
