= Sains Formation =

Geologic formation in France

- Stratigraphic range: Devonian
- Type: Formation

Location
- Country: France

The Sains Formation is a geologic formation in France. It preserves fossils dating back to the Devonian period.

== See also ==
- List of fossiliferous stratigraphic units in France
