= Calcares marins à alvéolines =

Geologic formation in France

- Stratigraphic range: Ypresian; ~55–50 Ma
- Type: Formation

Lithology
- Primary: Limestone

Location
- Country: France

The Calcares marins à alvéolines is a geologic formation in France. It preserves fossils dated to the Paleogene period.

== See also ==
- List of fossiliferous stratigraphic units in France
