= Val d'Homs Formation =

Geologic formation in France

- Stratigraphic range: Cambrian
- Type: Formation

Location
- Country: France

The Val d'Homs Formation is a geologic formation in the Montagne Noire region of southern France. It preserves fossils, like trilobites and brachiopods, dating back to the Cambrian period.

== See also ==
- List of fossiliferous stratigraphic units in France
