= Quartzites et Poudingues de Trémentines =

Geologic formation in France

- Stratigraphic range: Cambrian
- Type: Formation

Location
- Country: France

The Quartzites et Poudingues de Trémentines is a geologic formation in France. It preserves fossils dating back to the Cambrian period.

== See also ==
- List of fossiliferous stratigraphic units in France
