= Calcaire a oolithes ferrugineuses =

Geologic formation in France

- Stratigraphic range: Jurassic
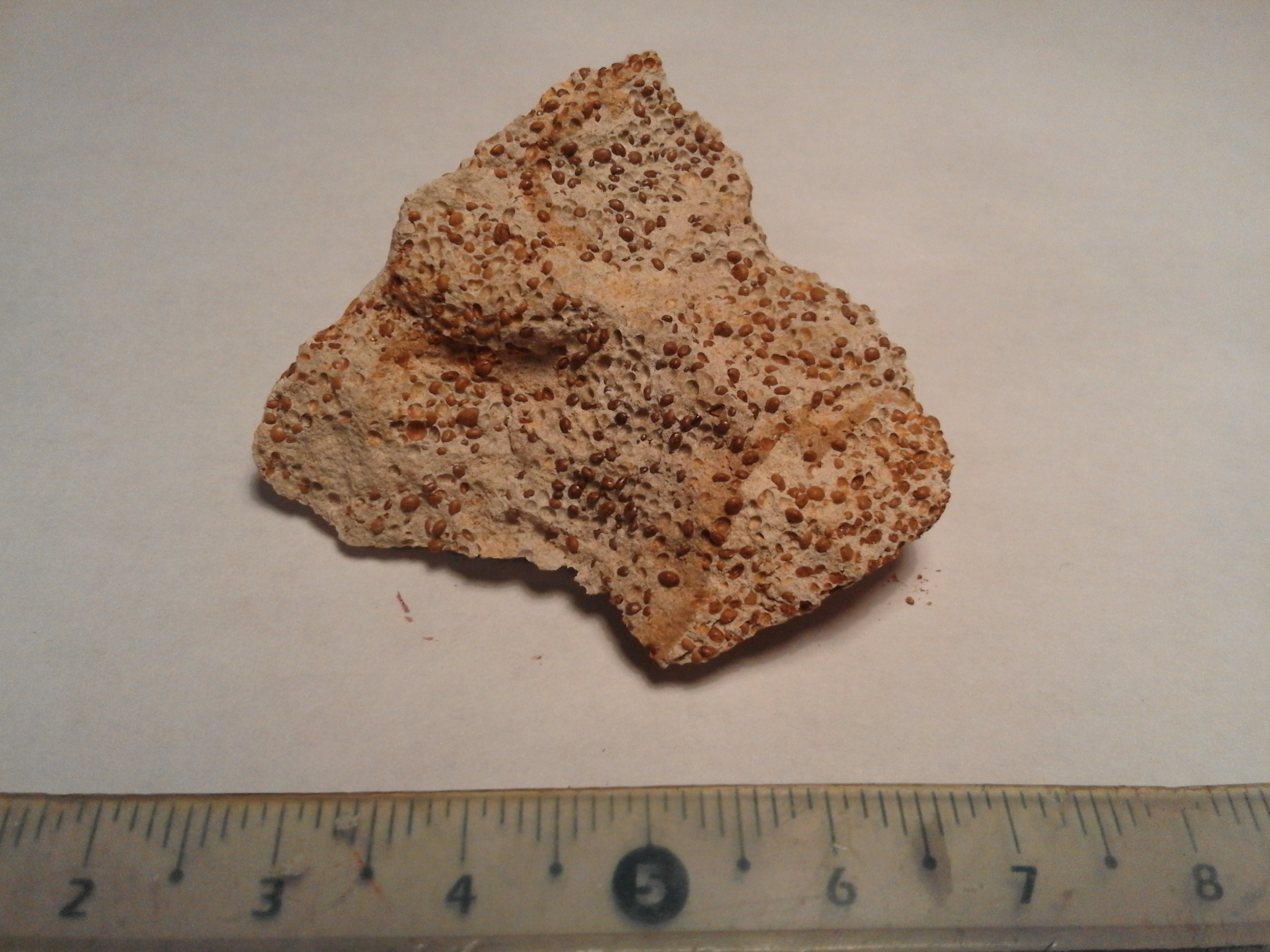
- Calcaire à oolithes ferrugineuses, Mamers, Sarthe
- Type: Formation

Location
- Country: France

The Calcaire a oolithes ferrugineuses is a geologic formation in France. It preserves fossils dated to the Jurassic period.

== See also ==
- List of fossiliferous stratigraphic units in France
