= Sables à Mactres =

Geologic formation in France

- Stratigraphic range: Neogene
- Type: Formation

Location
- Country: France

The Sables à Mactres is a geologic formation in France. It preserves fossils dating back to the Neogene period.

== See also ==
- List of fossiliferous stratigraphic units in France
