= Calcaire spathique =

French geological formation with Jurassic fossils

- Stratigraphic range: Jurassic
- Type: Formation

Location
- Country: France

The Calcaire spathique is a geologic formation in France. It preserves fossils dating back to the Jurassic period.

== See also ==
- List of fossiliferous stratigraphic units in France
