= Petite Formation =

Geologic formation in France

- Stratigraphic range: Carboniferous
- Type: Formation

Location
- Country: France

The Petite Formation is a geologic formation in France. It preserves fossils dating back to the Carboniferous period.

== See also ==
- List of fossiliferous stratigraphic units in France
