= Pissot Formation =

Geologic formation in France

- Stratigraphic range: Darriwilian-Sandbian (Dobrotivian); ~461–457.5 Ma
- Geologic map of the Armorican Massif
- Type: Formation

Lithology
- Primary: Siltstone

Location
- Coordinates: 49.0°N 1.0°W
- Approximate paleocoordinates: 66.9°S 72.2°E
- Region: Orne
- Country: France
- Extent: Armorican Massif
- Pissot Formation (France) Pissot Formation (Normandy)

The Pissot Formation is a geologic formation in the Armorican Massif of Normandy, northwestern France. It preserves fossils dating back to the Darriwilian to Sandbian (Dobrotivian in the regional stratigraphy) stages of the Ordovician period.

== Fossil content ==
The following fossils have been reported from the formation:

=== Trilobites ===
- Dalmanitina (Eodalmanitina) destombesi
- Morgatia hupei
- Dionide sp.

== See also ==
- List of fossiliferous stratigraphic units in France
