= Marnes de Gan =

Geologic formation in France

- Stratigraphic range: Ypresian; ~55–50 Ma
- Type: Formation

Lithology
- Primary: Marl

Location
- Country: France

Type section
- Named for: Gan

The Marnes de Gan is a geologic formation in France. It preserves fossils dating back to the Paleogene period.

== See also ==
- List of fossiliferous stratigraphic units in France
