= Gres a Meules =

Geologic formation in France

- Stratigraphic range: Triassic
- Type: Formation

Location
- Country: France

The Gres a Meules is a geologic formation in France. It preserves fossils dating back to the Triassic period.

== See also ==
- List of fossiliferous stratigraphic units in France
