= Bargy Conglomerate =

Geologic formation in France

- Stratigraphic range: Cretaceous
- Type: Formation

Location
- Country: France

The Bargy Conglomerate is a geologic formation in Haute-Savoie region in France. It preserves fossils dating back to the Cretaceous period. It includes a high accumulation of phosphate materials with a rich microbial layer beneath which hoplitids and inoceramids are found.

== See also ==
- List of fossiliferous stratigraphic units in France
