= Obere Bunte Mergel =

- Stratigraphic range: Upper Triassic
- Type: Geological formation

Location
- Country: Switzerland

The Obere Bunte Mergel is a geological formation in Switzerland. It dates back to the late Norian.

== Vertebrate fauna ==
Dinosaurs of the Obere Bunte Mergel
Genus	Species	Location	Stratigraphic position	Abundance	Notes	Images
Plateosaurus	cf. Plateosaurus longiceps					Plateosaurus at the Museo del Jurásico de Asturias
Suborder: Theropoda; 1. Indeterminate remains.				Includes "cf. Liliensternus sp."		Plateosaurus at the Museo del Jurásico de Asturias

== See also ==
- List of dinosaur-bearing rock formations
