= Falun d'Ormoy =

Fossiliferous formation in France

- Stratigraphic range: Paleogene
- Type: Formation

Location
- Country: France

The Falun d'Ormoy is a geologic formation in France. It preserves fossils dating back to the Paleogene period.

== See also ==
- List of fossiliferous stratigraphic units in France
