= Tuffeau de St Omer =

Geologic formation in France

Tuffeau de Saint-Omer
- Stratigraphic range: Mid Thanetian; ~58 Ma
- Type: Formation
- Underlies: Sables et Grès de Grandgiise
- Overlies: Senonian formations
- Thickness: Up to 26 m (85 ft)

Lithology
- Primary: Sandstone (!)

Location
- Coordinates: 50.5°N 3.2°E
- Approximate paleocoordinates: 45.0°N 0.8°E
- Region: Nord, Pas-de-Calais
- Country: France
- Extent: Southernmost North Sea Graben

Type section
- Named for: Saint-Omer
- Location: Saint-Omer, Pas-de-Calais
- Tuffeau de St Omer (France)

The "Tuffeau" de Saint-Omer is a geologic formation in northern France. The sandstones of the formation, named after Saint-Omer, preserve bird and primate fossils dating back to the middle Thanetian age of the Paleocene epoch of the Paleogene period, dating to about 58 Ma.

The European land mammal age, a continental biostratigraphic zonation for the Cenozoic, as ammonites for the Mesozoic and conodonts for the Paleozoic, classification starts after this age, the Thanetian is correlative with the MP2 to 5 of the Mammal Paleogene zone of Europe. At this time in geologic history the climate was at an all-time high with estimated tropical temperatures of 34 °C (93 °F) and 2000 ppm atmospheric CO_{2}.

The formation is locally referred to and geologically known as tuff, although the lithology of the formation is glauconitic sandstone, deposited in a shallow marine environment at the southernmost edge of the North Sea Graben.

== Description ==
The Tuffeau de Saint-Omer is described as a glauconitic well-sorted sandstone, with opal cement and the invertebrate fossils Pholadomya cuneata, P. konincki, Cyprina morrisi, Thracia prestwichi, Natica deshayesiana and Martesia cuneata. The Tuffeau is exposed near Molinghem and Doulac, north of Saint-Omer, after which the formation is named. Despite the siliciclastic lithology, the formation is locally referred to as "tuff"; volcaniclastic rock.

The thickness of the unit varies from 10 metres (33 ft) (near Garbecque) to around 20 metres (66 ft) (in Arques, Quiestède, and Aire-sur-la-Lys) and sometimes more (24 metres (79 ft) at Helfaut and 26 metres (85 ft) at Blendecques). The thickness of the tuff intersperses with the Sables d'Ostricourt, giving a total thickness of the Landenian section of 35 to 40 metres (115 to 131 ft).

== Fossil content ==
At Templeuve, the following fossils were reported:

Primates

- Berruvius cf. lasseroni
- Sarnacius aff. gingerichi

Birds

- Lithornithidae indet.
- Pelagornithidae indet.

== See also ==
- List of fossiliferous stratigraphic units in France
- Cerrejón Formation, contemporaneous fossiliferous formation in Colombia
- Itaboraí Formation, contemporaneous fossiliferous formation in Brazil
- European land mammal age
