= Monteils Formation =

Geological formation in France

- Stratigraphic range: Priabonian
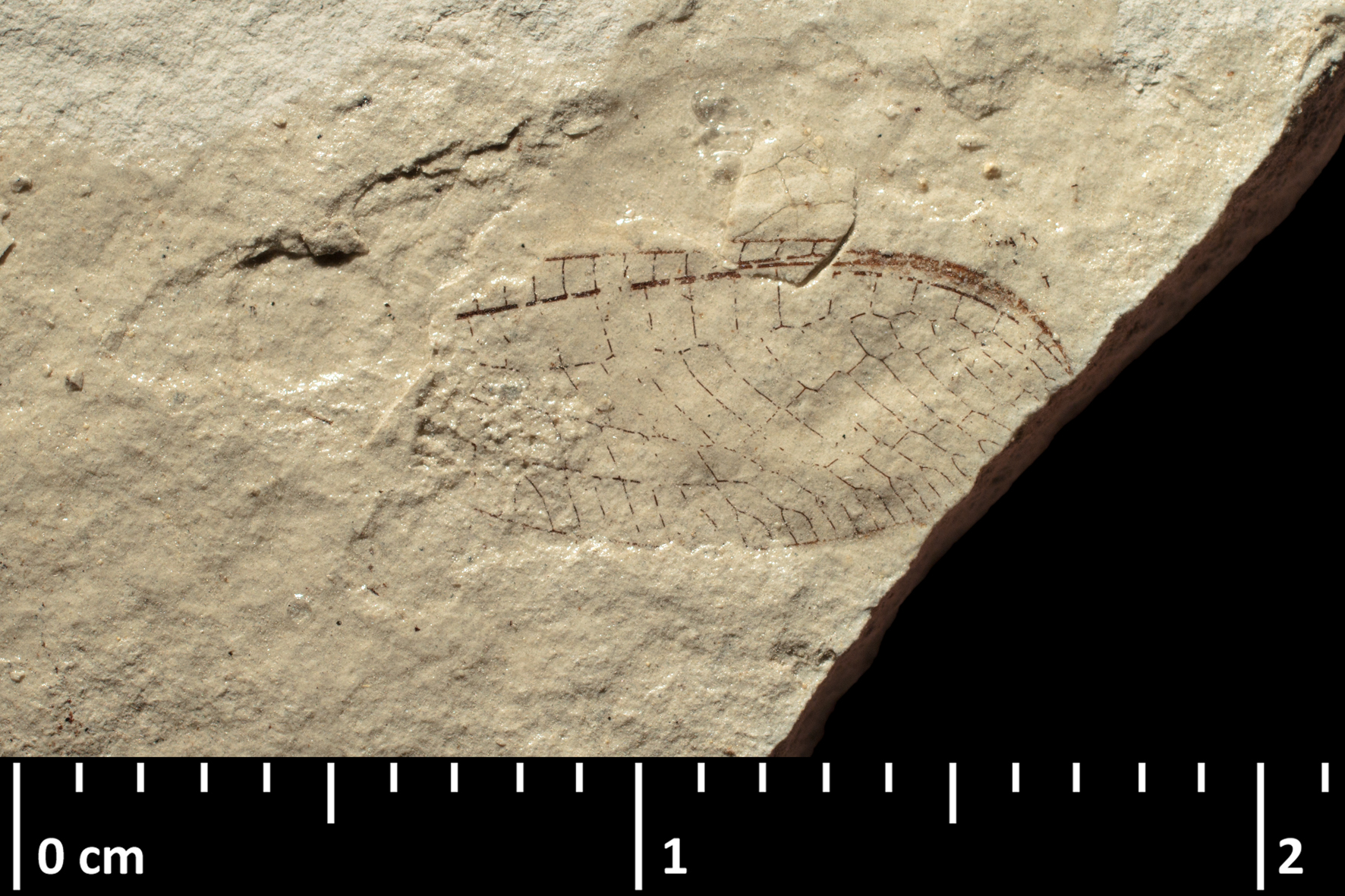
- Paleochrysopa monteilsensis holotype wing
- Type: Formation

Location
- Country: France

The Monteils Formation is a geologic formation in France. It preserves fossils dating back to the Paleogene period.

== See also ==
- List of fossiliferous stratigraphic units in France
