= Kermeur Sandstone =

French geologic formation

- Stratigraphic range: Ordovician
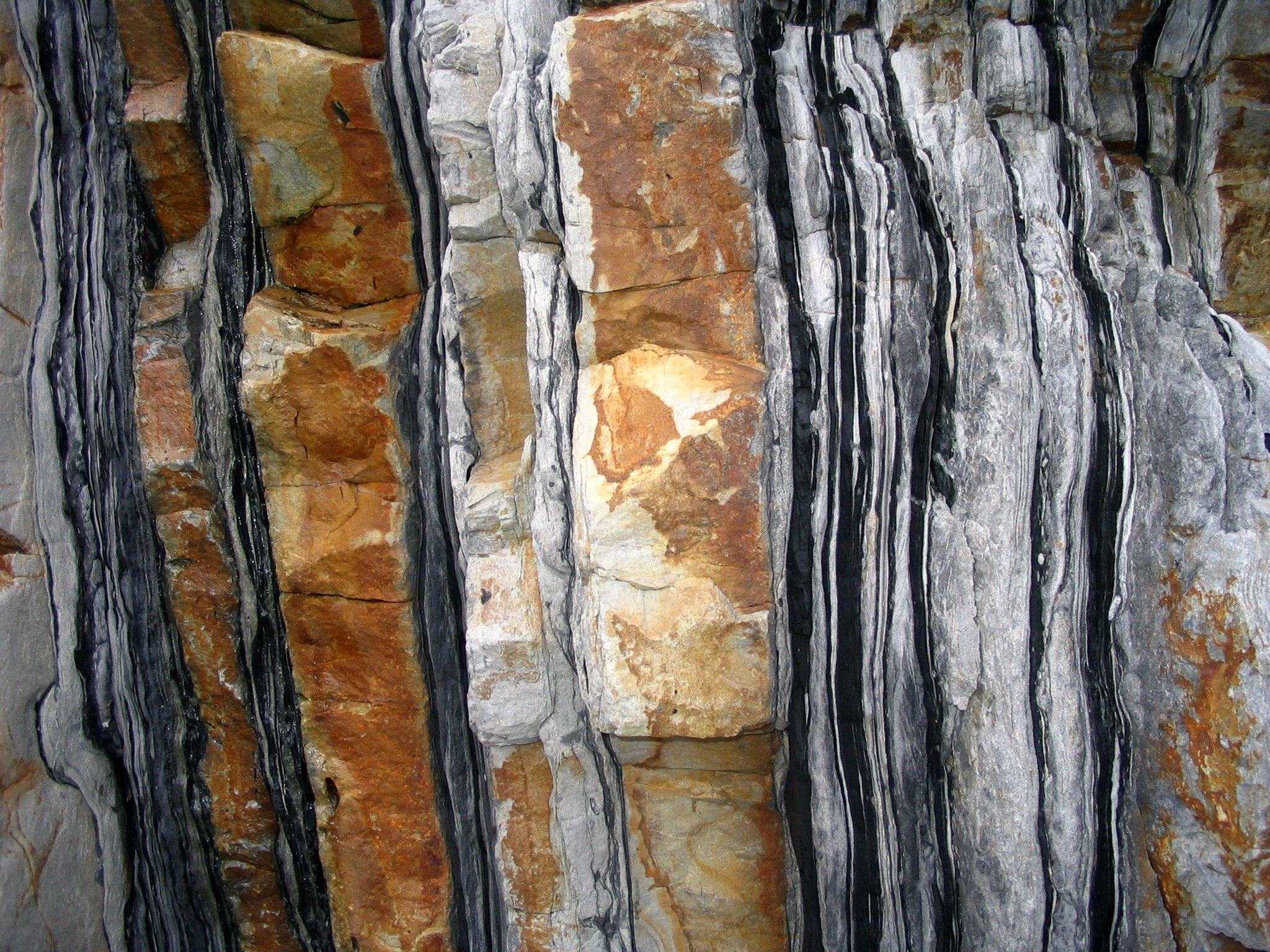
- Schist and Quartzite, Kermeur Formation, Bretagne
- Type: Formation

Lithology
- Primary: Sandstone

Location
- Country: France

The Kermeur Sandstone is a geologic formation in France. It preserves fossils dating back to the Ordovician period.

== See also ==
- List of fossiliferous stratigraphic units in France
