= Blacourt Formation =

Geologic formation in France

- Stratigraphic range: Devonian
- Type: Formation

Location
- Country: France

The Blacourt Formation is a geologic formation in France. It preserves fossils dating back to the Devonian period.

== Paleofauna ==
=== Invertebrates ===
- Quasillites
- Rothpletzella
- Tentaculites

=== Vertebrates ===
- Melanodus loonesi
- Pokorninella bricae
- cf. Synthetodus

== See also ==
- List of fossiliferous stratigraphic units in France
