= Grès de Boisset =

Geologic formation in France

- Stratigraphic range: Rhaetian; ~206–202 Ma
- Type: Formation

Lithology
- Primary: Sandstone
- Other: Marl

Location
- Coordinates: 46.9°N 5.9°E
- Approximate paleocoordinates: 33.8°N 9.2°E
- Region: Franche-Comté
- Country: France

Type section
- Named for: Boisset
- Grès de Boisset (France)

The Grès de Boisset (Boisset sandstone) is a geologic formation in France. It preserves fossils dating back to the Rhaetian stage of the Late Triassic period.

== Fossil content ==
The following fossils have been reported from the formation:

=== Mammals ===
- Thomasia sp.
- ?Kuehneotheriidae indet.

=== Fish ===
- Nemacanthus monilifer
- Birgeria sp.
- Hybodus sp.
- Lissodus sp.
- Pseudodalatias sp.
- Saurichthys sp.

== See also ==
- List of fossiliferous stratigraphic units in France
