= Molasse Coquilliere =

Geologic formation in France

- Stratigraphic range: Neogene
- Type: Formation

Location
- Country: France

The Molasse Coquilliere is a geologic formation in France. It preserves fossils dating back to the Neogene period, which started 23.03 million years ago and ended 2.58 million years ago.

== See also ==
- List of fossiliferous stratigraphic units in France
