= Calcaires de Valfin =

Geologic formation in France

- Stratigraphic range: Jurassic
- Type: Formation

Location
- Country: France

The Calcaires de Valfin is a geologic formation in France which preserves Jurassic period fossils.

== See also ==
- List of fossiliferous stratigraphic units in France
