= Calcaire d'Erbray =

Geologic formation in France

Calcaire d’Erbray
- Stratigraphic range: Devonian
- Type: Formation

Location
- Country: France

The Calcaire d’Erbray is a geologic formation in France. It preserves fossils dating back to the Devonian period.

== See also ==
- List of fossiliferous stratigraphic units in France
