= Tufs et calcaires de Rosan =

Geologic formation in France

- Stratigraphic range: Katian-Hirnantian (Kralodvorian-Kosovian); ~450–443.7 Ma
- Geologic map of the Armorican Massif
- Type: Formation

Lithology
- Primary: Tuff, limestone
- Other: Pillow lava, claystone, sandstone

Location
- Coordinates: 48.3°N 4.2°W
- Approximate paleocoordinates: 70.3°S 53.9°E
- Region: Finistère
- Country: France
- Extent: Armorican Massif

Type section
- Named for: Rosan
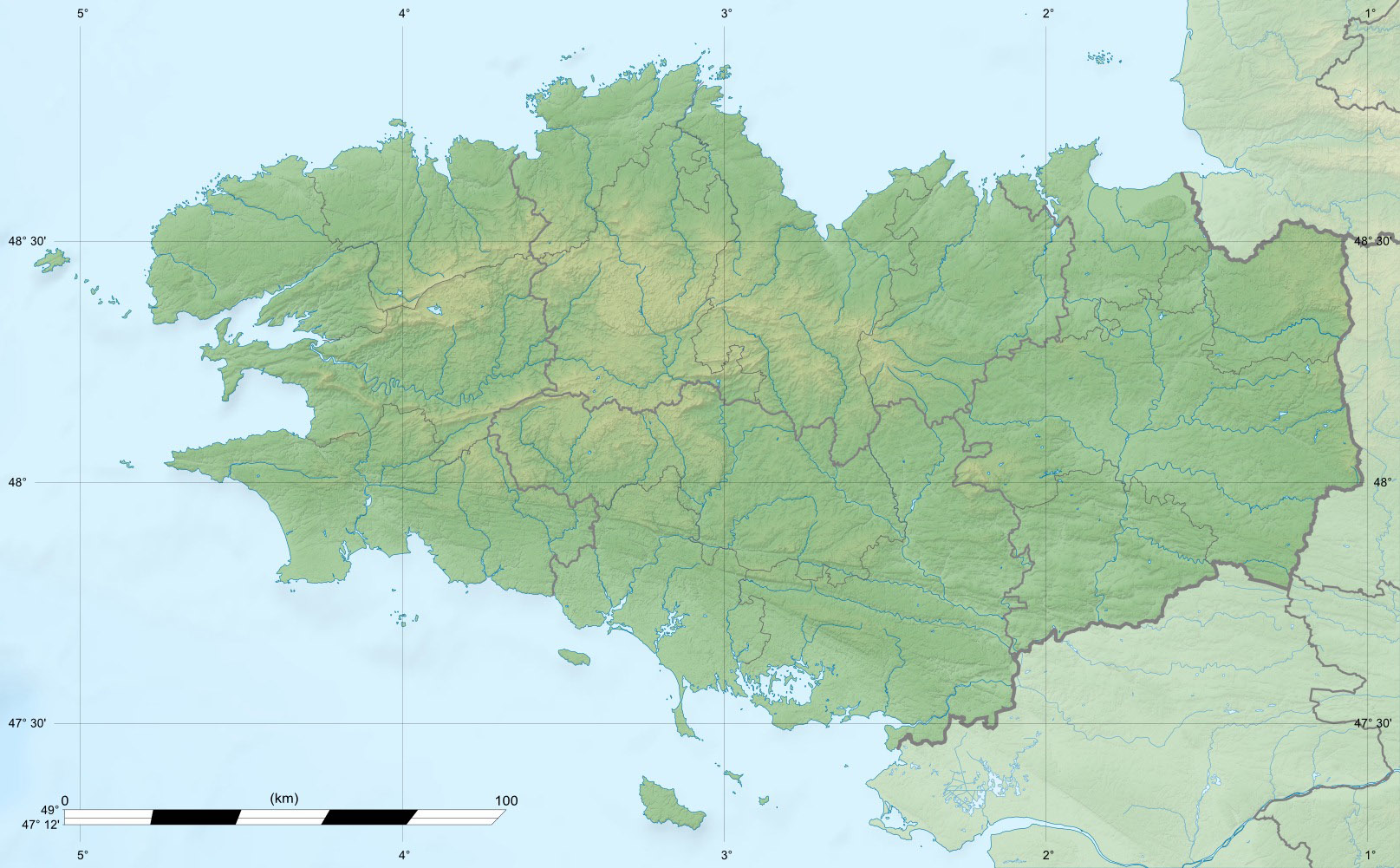
- Tufs et calcaires de Rosan (France) Tufs et calcaires de Rosan (Brittany)

The Tufs et calcaires de Rosan (Breton: Tufoù roz ha mein-kalz) is a geologic formation in France. It preserves fossils dating back to the Katian to Hirnantian (Kralodvorian to Kosovian in the regional stratigraphy) stages of the Late Ordovician period.

== Fossil content ==
The formation has provided fossils of:

=== Strophomenata ===
- Hedstroemina sp.
- Iberomena sp.
- Leptaena sp.
- Leptestiina sp.

=== Rhynchonellata ===
- Porambonites sp.
- Eoanastrophia sp.
- Rostricellula sp.
- ?Dalmanella sp.
- Bancroftina sp.
- Nicolella sp.
- Retrorsirostra sp.
- Ptychopleurella sp.
- Dolerorthis sp.
- Mcewanella sp.
- Aberia sp.
- ?Rhactorthis sp.

== See also ==
- List of fossiliferous stratigraphic units in France
