= Ardengost Formation =

Geologic formation in France

- Stratigraphic range: Carboniferous
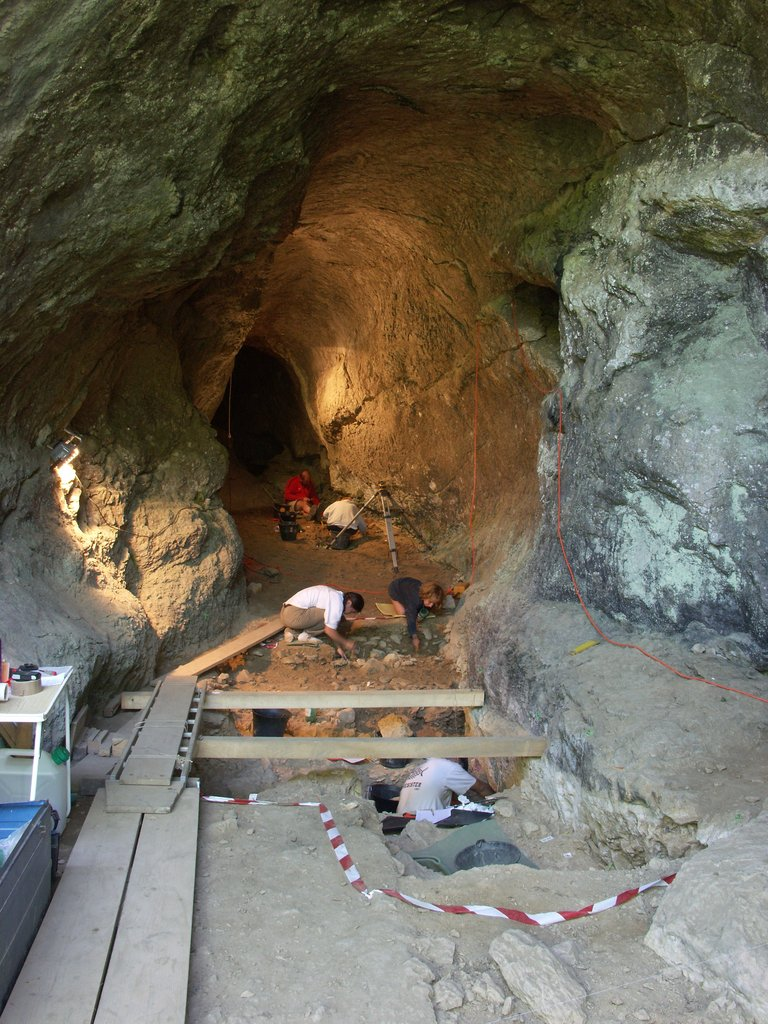
- Grotte noisetier, Fréchet-Aure, Hautes-Pyrénées
- Type: Formation

Location
- Country: France

The Ardengost Formation is a geologic formation in France. It preserves fossils dating back to the Carboniferous period.

== See also ==
- List of fossiliferous stratigraphic units in France
