= Calcaires a Asteries =

Geologic formation in France

Calcaires à Asteries
- Stratigraphic range: Oligocene, 34–28 Ma
- Type: Formation

Location
- Country: France

The Calcaires à Asteries are a geologic formation in France. It preserves fossils dating back to the Oligocene epoch. Among the known fossils is the kekenodontid whale Phococetus.

== See also ==
- List of fossiliferous stratigraphic units in France
