= Craie glauconieuse =

Geologic formation

- Stratigraphic range: Cretaceous
- Type: Formation

Location
- Country: France

The Craie glauconieuse is a geologic formation in France. It preserves fossils dating back to the Cretaceous period.

== See also ==
- List of fossiliferous stratigraphic units in France
