= Niveau du gypse d'Aix Formation =

Geological formation

- Stratigraphic range: Paleogene
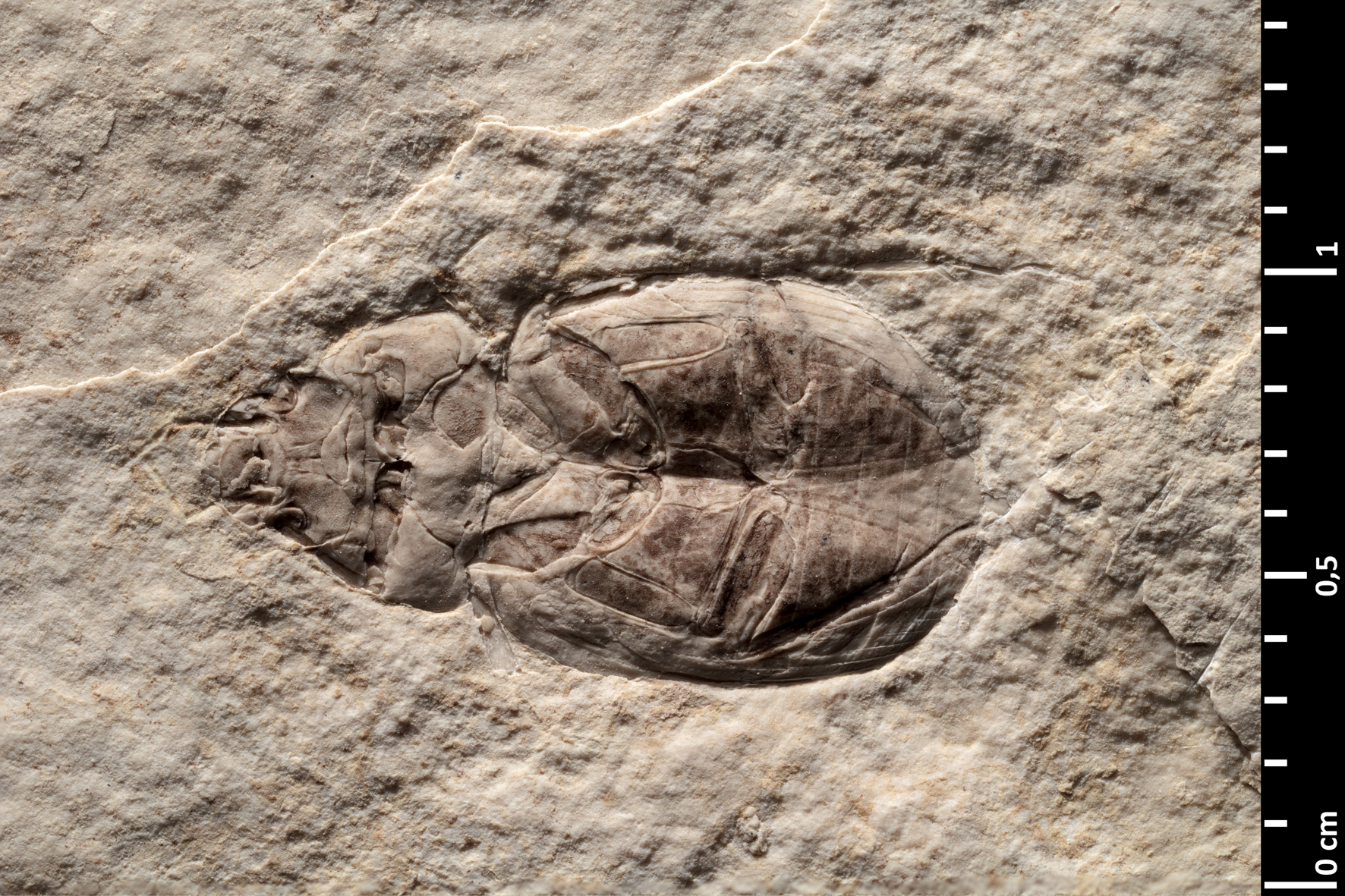
- Limnoxenus olenus holotype
- Type: Formation

Location
- Country: France

The Niveau du gypse d'Aix Formation is a geologic formation in France. It preserves fossils dating back to the Paleogene period.

== See also ==
- List of fossiliferous stratigraphic units in France
