= Keuper Formation =

Geologic formation in France

- Stratigraphic range: Triassic
- Type: Formation

Location
- Country: France

The Keuper Formation is a geologic formation in France. It preserves fossils dating back to the Triassic period.

== See also ==
- List of fossiliferous stratigraphic units in France
- Keuper (a lithostratigraphic unit)
