= Grès et sables piquetés =

Geological formation in France

- Stratigraphic range: Early Cretaceous
- Type: Geological formation

Location
- Region: Europe
- Country: France

The Grès et sables piquetés (French for: "spotted sandstone and sand") is a geological formation in Haute Marne and Meuse Departments, France, that dates back to the Early Cretaceous. Dinosaur remains are among the fossils that have been recovered from the formation.

== Fossil content ==
Color key: Taxon / Reclassified taxon / Taxon falsely reported as present / Dubious taxon or junior synonym / Ichnotaxon / Ootaxon / Morphotaxon	Notes; Uncertain or tentative taxa are in small text; ~~crossed out~~ taxa are discredited.

=== Dinosaurs ===
==== Ornithischians ====
Ornithischians of the Grès et sables piquetés
Genus	Species	Location	Stratigraphic position	Material	Notes	Images
Iguanodon	I. bernissartensis		Barremian		A iguanodontid ornithopod	

== See also ==
- List of dinosaur-bearing rock formations
