= Argiles Ostréennes =

Geological formation in France

- Stratigraphic range: Early Cretaceous
- Type: Geological formation

Location
- Region: Europe
- Country: France

The Argiles Ostréennes (French for: "clay with fossil oysters") is a geological formation in northern central France whose strata date back to the Early Cretaceous. Dinosaur remains are among the fossils that have been recovered from the formation.

== Vertebrate paleofauna ==
- Iguanodontia indet

== See also ==
- List of dinosaur-bearing rock formations
