= Craie tufau =

Geologic formarion in France

- Type: Geological formation

The Craie tufau is a Mesozoic geologic formation in northern France and southern England. Dinosaur remains diagnostic to the genus level are among the fossils that have been recovered from the formation.

== Paleofauna ==
- ?Aepysaureus sp

== See also ==
- List of dinosaur-bearing rock formations
  - List of stratigraphic units with few dinosaur genera
