= Argiles de Châtillon =

Geologic formation in France

- Stratigraphic range: Jurassic
- Type: Formation

Location
- Country: France

The Argiles de Châtillon is a geologic formation in France. It preserves fossils dating back to the Jurassic period. Dinosaur remains are among the fossils that have been recovered from the formation, although none have yet been referred to a specific genus.

== See also ==
- List of fossiliferous stratigraphic units in France
- List of dinosaur-bearing rock formations
  - List of stratigraphic units with indeterminate dinosaur fossils
