= Calcaire à Spatangues =

Geologic formation in France

- Stratigraphic range: Hauterivian
- Type: Geological formation

Location
- Region: Europe
- Country: France

The Calcaire à Spatangues (French for: "limestone with Spatangus") is a geological formation in the Paris basin of northern central France whose strata date back to the Early Cretaceous. Dinosaur remains are among the fossils that have been recovered from the formation.

== Fossil content ==
| Color key: Taxon / Reclassified taxon / Taxon falsely reported as present / Dubious taxon or junior synonym / Ichnotaxon / Ootaxon / Morphotaxon | Notes; Uncertain or tentative taxa are in small text; ~~crossed out~~ taxa are discredited. |

=== Dinosaurs ===
==== Ornithischians ====
Ornithischians of the Calcaire à Spatangues
| Genus | Species | Location | Stratigraphic position | Material | Notes | Images |
|---|---|---|---|---|---|---|
| Mantellisaurus | Indeterminate | | Hauterivian | | A hadrosauriform styracosternan | |

== See also ==
- List of dinosaur-bearing rock formations
