= Weberg =

Surname list

Weberg is the surname of the following people

- Anders Weberg, Swedish director
- Charlie Weberg (born 1998), Swedish footballer
- Dag C. Weberg (born 1937), Norwegian politician

== See also ==
- Weberg Formation, geologic formation in Oregon, United States
