= Argovian Formation =

Geologic formation in France

- Stratigraphic range: Jurassic
- Type: Formation

Location
- Country: France, Switzerland

The Argovian Formation (French: Argovien) is a geologic formation in France. It preserves fossils dated to the Jurassic period.

== Location and structure ==
The Argovian is a stratigraphic unit and facies of the Upper Jurassic (specifically the Middle to Upper Oxfordian), primarily identified in the Jura Mountains of France and Switzerland, as well as the Paris Basin. Historically considered a distinct stage, modern stratigraphy typically classifies it as a facies characterized by alternating marls and spongiolitic limestones, often corresponding to the Terrain à Chailles or Birmenstorf Member in regional lithostratigraphy. The formation marks a transition in the sedimentary environment of the Tethys Ocean shelf, representing deeper subtidal waters that favored the growth of extensive siliceous sponge bioherms (sponge reefs) rather than the shallow coral reefs found in adjacent facies.

== Paleontology ==
Paleontologically, the Argovian layers are significant for their rich and well-preserved marine fauna. The unit yields diverse ammonite assemblages, including species of Cardioceras, Perisphinctes, and Ochetoceras canaliculatum, which are essential for biostratigraphic dating of the Oxfordian age. In eastern France, the Argovian facies (specifically the Terrain à Chailles) acts as a Lagerstätte, preserving soft-bodied organisms and articulated crustaceans such as glypheoid lobsters in distinct siliceous nodules. The abundance of siliceous sponges in these strata has led to the historical designation of these layers as the "Spongitien" facies in older geological literature.
