= Aberia (brachiopod) =

Aberia Temporal range: 449.5–443.7 Ma Kralodvorian – Ashgill (Ordovician)

Scientific classification
- Kingdom: Animalia
- Phylum: Brachiopoda
- Class: Rhynchonellata
- Order: †Orthida
- Family: †Rhactorthidae
- Genus: †Aberia; Williams, 1963

Extinct genus of marine lamp shells

Aberia is an extinct genus of brachiopod found in Ordovician strata in Finistère, France. It was a stationary epifaunal suspension feeder.
