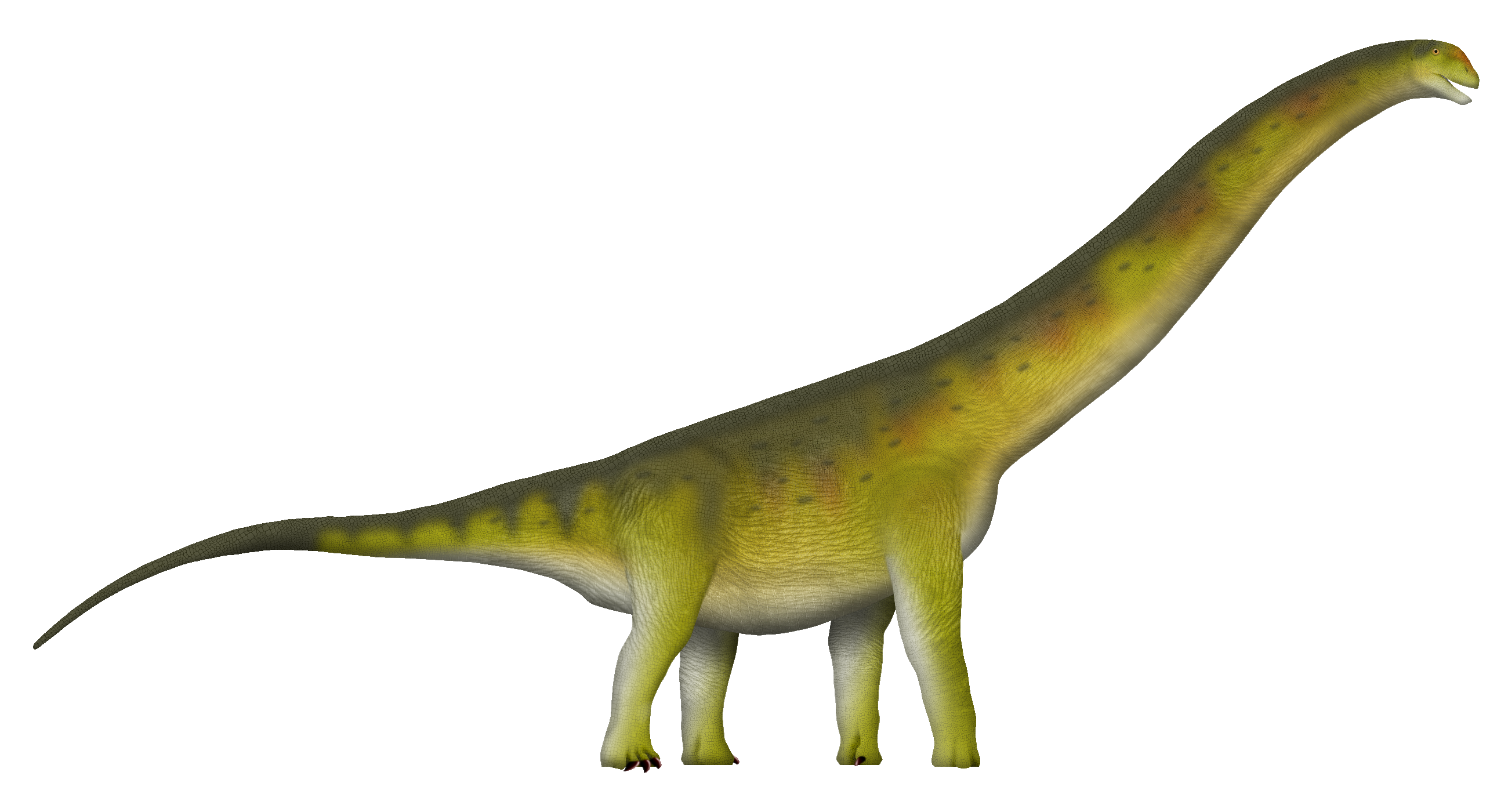
- Restoration

Scientific classification
- Kingdom: Animalia
- Phylum: Chordata
- Class: Reptilia
- Clade: Dinosauria
- Clade: Saurischia
- Clade: †Sauropodomorpha
- Clade: †Sauropoda
- Clade: †Macronaria
- Clade: †Titanosauria
- Genus: †Gandititan
- Species: †G. cavocaudatus

Binomial name
- †Gandititan cavocaudatus Han et al., 2024

= Gandititan =

Gandititan Temporal range: Late Cretaceous, Cenomanian–Turonian

Genus of titanosaurian dinosaurs

Gandititan is an extinct genus of titanosaurian sauropod dinosaur from the Late Cretaceous Zhoutian Formation of China. The genus contains a single species, G. cavocaudatus, known from a partial skeleton.

== Discovery and naming ==
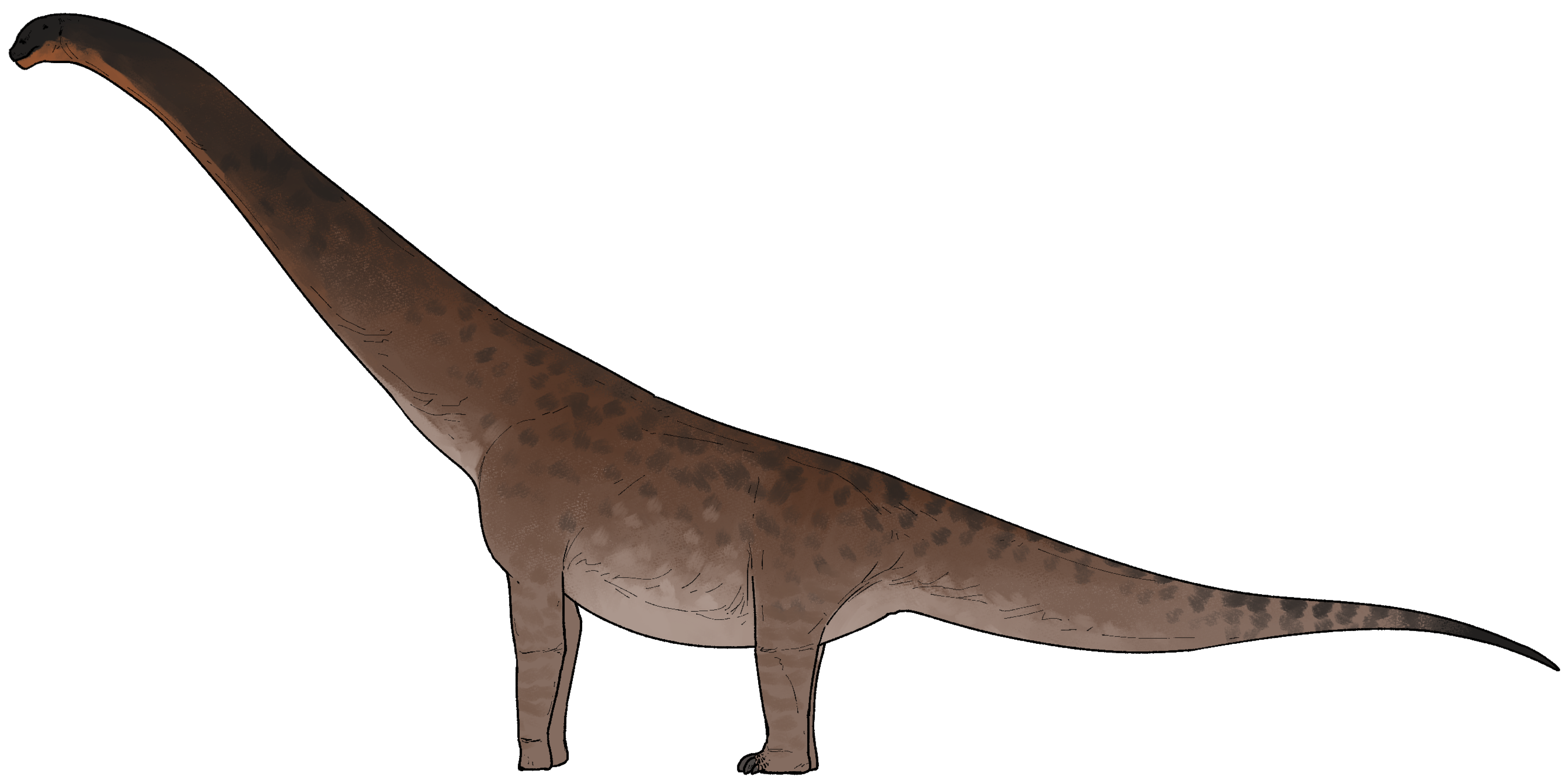
Life restoration

The Gandititan holotype specimen, JXGM-F-V1, was discovered in sediments of the Zhoutian Formation in Datangkeng, Ganxian District, Ganzhou City, Jiangxi Province, China. The specimen is a partial postcranial skeleton including an articulated series of six cervical vertebrae, an articulated series of two partial dorsal vertebrae, six sacral vertebrae, and 17 caudal vertebrae, some ribs, and a partial right pelvic girdle.

In 2024, Han et al. described Gandititan cavocaudatus as a new genus and species of basal titanosaurian sauropod based on these fossil remains. The generic name, "Gandititan", combines "Gan", in reference to Ganzhou City, the pinyin word "di", meaning "Earth" (also the first syllable of "dizhi", meaning "geology"), and the word "titan", a common suffix for giant sauropod names, referencing the pre-Olympian gods of Greek mythology. While the authors intended "Gandi" to honor geological studies in Ganzhou, they also note the similarity to the Old Norse "gandr", referencing magical beings. The specific name, "cavocaudatus", combines the Latin words "cavum", meaning "cavity" and "cauda", meaning "tail", alluding to the pattern seen in the caudal vertebrae.

== Description ==
Gandititan is estimated at being 14 metres (46 ft) long.

== Classification ==
Han et al. (2024) entered Gandititan into a phylogenetic analysis and recovered it as the sister taxon to Abdarainurus in a clade of basal titanosaurs including Andesaurus and an assortment of East Asian somphospondylans. Earlier, in the preferred tree of their 2020 description of Abdarainurus, Averianov & Lopatin recovered a similar clade of basal titanosaurs, with Abdarainurus as the sister taxon to the clade containing Andesaurus and Huabeisaurus. The results of the phylogenetic analyses of Han et al. are shown in the cladogram below:

- Titanosauria
  - - Andesaurus
    - Baotianmansaurus
    - Dongyangosaurus
    - Huabeisaurus
    - - Abdarainurus
      - Gandititan
  - - - Daxiatitan
      - Xianshanosaurus
    - - Ruyangosaurus
      - Lithostrotia
