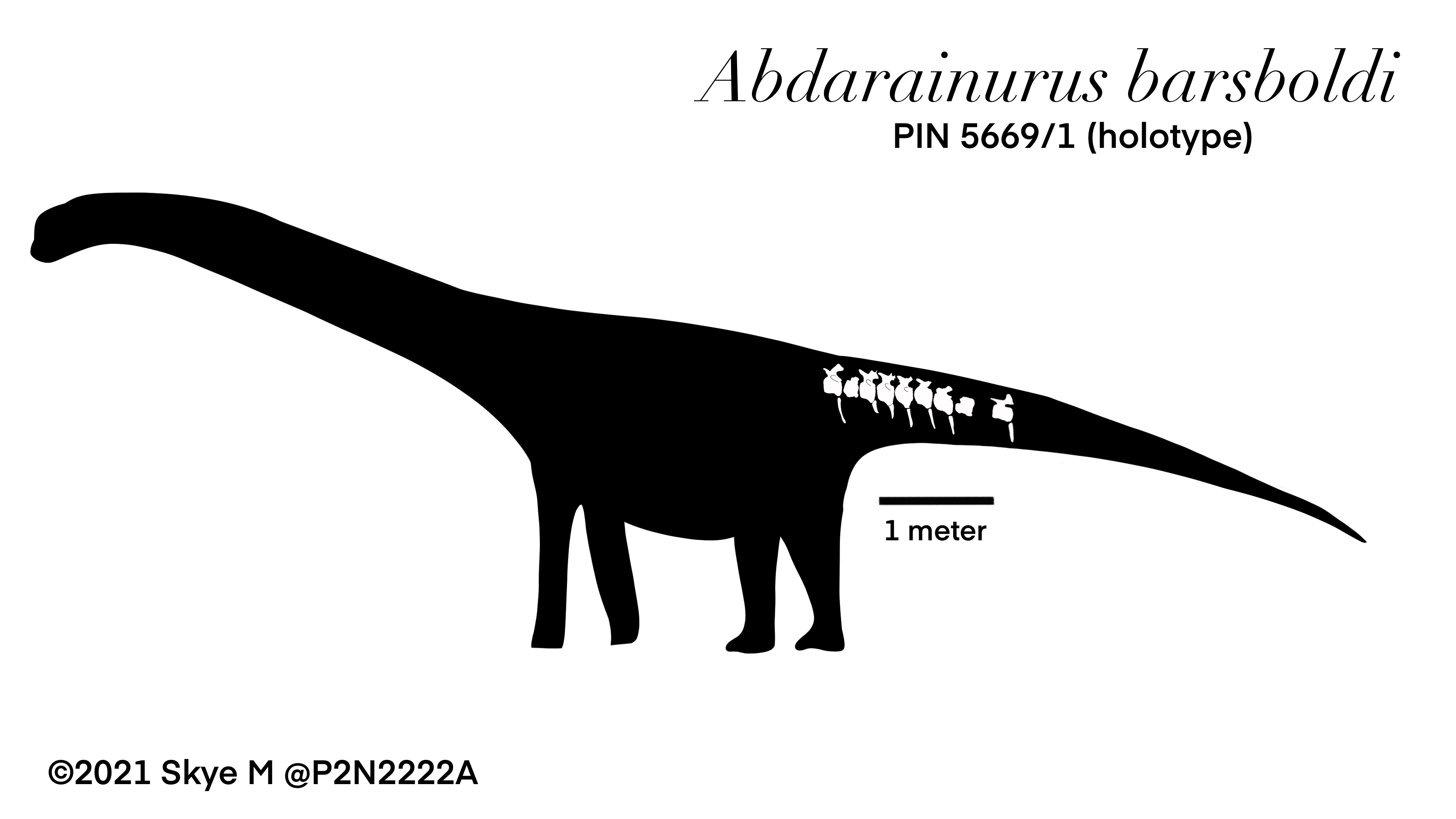
- Skeletal reconstruction with known material in white

Scientific classification
- Domain: Eukaryota
- Kingdom: Animalia
- Phylum: Chordata
- Clade: Dinosauria
- Clade: Saurischia
- Clade: †Sauropodomorpha
- Clade: †Sauropoda
- Clade: †Macronaria
- Clade: †Titanosauria
- Genus: †Abdarainurus; Averianov & Lopatin, 2020

Type species
- †Abdarainurus barsboldi Averianov & Lopatin, 2020

= Abdarainurus =

Abdarainurus Temporal range: Late Cretaceous 85–72.1 Ma

Extinct dinosaur genus

Abdarainurus (meaning "Abdrant Nuru tail" after the holotype locality) is a genus of titanosaur dinosaur from the Alagteeg Formation in Mongolia. The type and only species is A. barsboldi. Currently seen as an indeterminate titanosaur, it may represent a previously unknown lineage of Asian macronarians. Abdarainurus is not known from many remains; it is only known from eight front tail vertebrae and a middle tail vertebra and several chevrons.

== Discovery and naming ==
The holotype, PIN 5669/1, was discovered in 1970 in Abdrant Nuru, hence the genus name, during a Joint Soviet–Mongolian Paleontological expedition and was excavated by V. P. Tverdokhlebov of Saratov State University. The fossils were left unprepared until at least 2000, when paleontologist Andrei Podlesnow revealed that they probably belonged to a new genus of sauropod. The species Abdarainurus barsboldi was named in February 2020.

== Paleoecology ==
Abdarainurus was discovered in the Abdarant Nuru locality of the Alagteeg Formation (which may be the same unit as the overlying Djadochta Formation) of Mongolia and coexisted with the ankylosaur Pinacosaurus sp., and indeterminate turtles and dinosaurs.

== Classification ==
Size of Abdarainurus compared to a human

Abdarainurus was added to the phylogenetic analysis of Mannion and colleagues by Averianov and Lopatin, who ran the matrix under three different conditions. With all characters treated as equally important, Abdarainurus resolved as a non-titanosaur member of Somphospondyli, in a large polytomy with a variety of taxa. The more labile characters treated as slightly, or significantly, less important, Abdarainurus was either a basal titanosaur in a clade with Andesaurus and Huabeisaurus or as a member of Aeolosaurinae, respectively. As Abdarainurus was resolved with the fewest unique features as a basal titanosaur, Averianov and Lopatin suggested that phylogenetic result was the most likely, shown below.

- Titanosauria
  - - Abdarainurus
    - - Andesaurus
      - Huabeisaurus
  - - - Baotianmansaurus
      - - Dongyangosaurus
        - Jiangshanosaurus
    - - - Savannasaurus
        - - AODF 836
          - Diamantinasaurus
      - - Normanniasaurus
        - - Rinconsaurus
          - - - Lognkosauria
              - - Pitekunsaurus
                - Lithostrotia

In their 2024 description of Gandititan, Han et al. recovered it as the sister taxon to Abdarainurus, in a clade of basal titanosaurs also including Andesaurus and Huabeisaurus, like the original analysis by Averianov & Lopatin (2020), in addition to Baotianmansaurus and Dongyangosaurus, which were recovered as part of a slightly more derived clade by Averianov & Lopatin (2020). The results of their phylogenetic analyses are shown in the cladogram below:

- Titanosauria
  - - Andesaurus
    - Baotianmansaurus
    - Dongyangosaurus
    - Huabeisaurus
    - - Abdarainurus
      - Gandititan
  - - - Daxiatitan
      - Xianshanosaurus
    - - Ruyangosaurus
      - Lithostrotia
