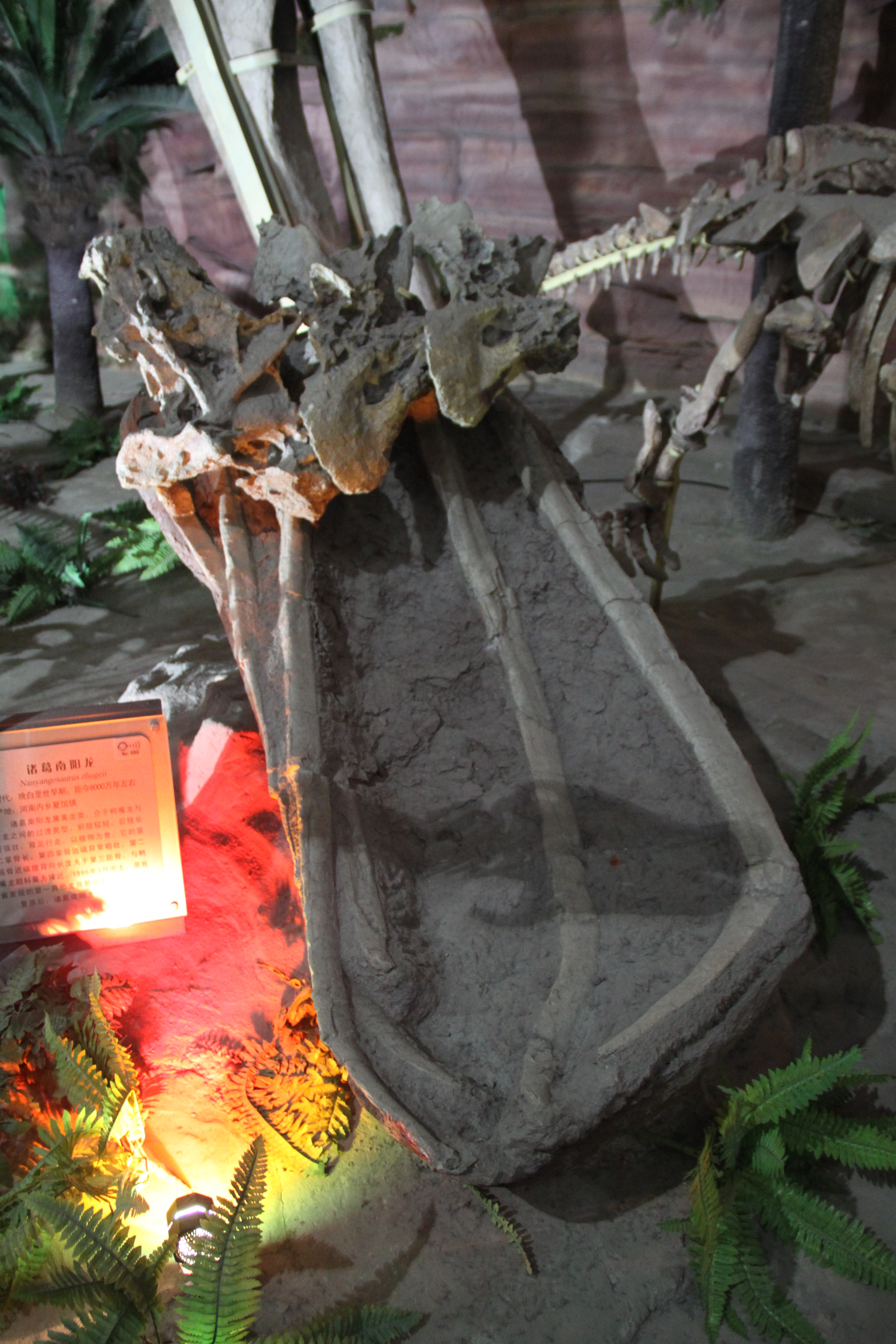
- Holotype specimen at the Henan Geological Museum

Scientific classification
- Domain: Eukaryota
- Kingdom: Animalia
- Phylum: Chordata
- Clade: Dinosauria
- Clade: Saurischia
- Clade: †Sauropodomorpha
- Clade: †Sauropoda
- Clade: †Macronaria
- Clade: †Somphospondyli
- Genus: †Baotianmansaurus; Zhang X. et al., 2009

Type species
- Baotianmansaurus henanensis Zhang X. et al., 2009

= Baotianmansaurus =

Baotianmansaurus Temporal range: Late Cretaceous, 99–90 Ma

Extinct genus of dinosaurs

Baotianmansaurus is an extinct genus of somphospondylian sauropod. Its fossils were discovered in the Late Cretaceous Gaogou Formation of Henan Province, China. The type and only species is B. henanensis — named after the province in which it was found.

== Discovery and naming ==
The fossils of Baotianmansaurus were discovered at a locality called Neixiang, near Nanyang City in the Henan Province of China. This locality is part of the Baotianman National Nature Reserve corresponds to the rocks of the Gaogou Formation. Dinosaur body fossils in this formation are rare, but a wide variety of egg fossils from dinosaurs and other animals have been found. The holotype, and only known specimen of Baotianmansaurus was given the designation 41HIII-0200 and is stored at the Henan Geological Museum in Zhengzhou.

It was described and given a name in April 2009 by a team of researchers including Zhang Xingliao, Lü Junchang, Xu Li, Li Jinhua, Hu Weiyong, Jia Songhai, Ji Qiang, and Zhang Chengjun in conjunction with the Henan Geological Museum, the Chinese Academy of Geological Sciences, and Lanzhou University. The genus was named "Baotianmansaurus" after the Baotianman Nature Reserve and the traditional Greek word saûros (σαῦρος), Latinized as saurus, meaning "lizard". The species epithet, "henanensis" is after the Henan province in which it was found.

== Description ==
Baotianmansaurus was a medium-sized sauropod. It was a very large animal in absolute terms, but not nearly as large as the largest of its contemporaries. The authors of its description did not provide an estimate of its in-life size, nor did they provide any measurements of the elements preserved. Rubén Molina-Pérez and Asier Larramendi estimated the full size of Baotianmansaurus at about 22.5 m (74 ft) long, 5.3 m (17 ft) tall at the shoulder, and weighing 21 t (46,000 lb) Gregory S. Paul published a slightly smaller estimate of 20 m (66 ft) long and weighing 15 t (33,000 lb).

The holotype of Baotianmansaurus is relatively incomplete. It consists of an incomplete dorsal vertebra from the upper back, another vertebra from the lower back, five ribs, two partial sacral vertebrae, an incomplete caudal vertebra, the distal end of a scapula, and several bone fragments that were not able to be identified. These remains were sufficient to name a new genus and species. Baotianmansaurus can be distinguished from all other sauropods by the presence of the following autapomorphies: a spongy character of the back vertebrae, short neural spines on the vertebrae of the middle back, a developed system of 11 e on the vertebrae, apneumatic ribs, amphicoelous caudal vertebrae that are shorter than they are wide, and several specific features of the vertebral laminae.

== Classification ==
The exact affinities of Baotianmansaurus have been controversial since it was first described. Zhang and colleagues originally assigned it to an indeterminate position in Titanosauriformes, outside of both Brachiosauridae and Somphospondyli. They remarked that it bears one of the autapomorphies of Somphospondyli, but that this was insufficient to assign it to that clade. Subsequent authors have recovered a wide variety of phylogenetic positions for the genus. Philip Mannion and colleagues found it to be a member of Saltasauridae, closely related to Opisthocoelicaudia. Alexander Averianov and Hans Dieter-Sues suggested that it was a titanosaur outside of the clade Lithostrotia. A 2011 review of the evolution of Titanosauriformes found it to belong to Euhelopodidae.

A 2019 examination of sauropods from the Tendaguru Formation found a close relationship between Baotianmansaurus, Dongyangosaurus, and the Diamantinasauria. The next year, a phylogenetic analysis corroborated a close relationship with Dongyangosaurus as well as with Jiangshanosaurus in a clade at the base of Titanosauria. More recent analyses using various datasets have recovered Baotianmansaurus as either a non-titanosaur somphospondylian closely related to Huanghetitan or a basal member of Titanosauria closely related to Andesaurus and Abdarainurus. The classification of titanosaurs and their relatives has generally been controversial, partly due to the fragmentary nature of many specimens, so the exact affinities of Baotianmansaurus remain unresolved, beyond it being a member of the large clade Somphospondyli. However, a close relationship with Dongyangosaurus has been corroborated by multiple analyses.

== See also ==
- 2009 in archosaur paleontology
- List of Asian dinosaurs
- List of sauropod species
- List of sauropodomorph type specimens
