= Zhoutian Formation =

Late Cretaceous geological formation in China

- Stratigraphic range: Late Cretaceous (Turonian–early Coniacian), 96–90 Ma
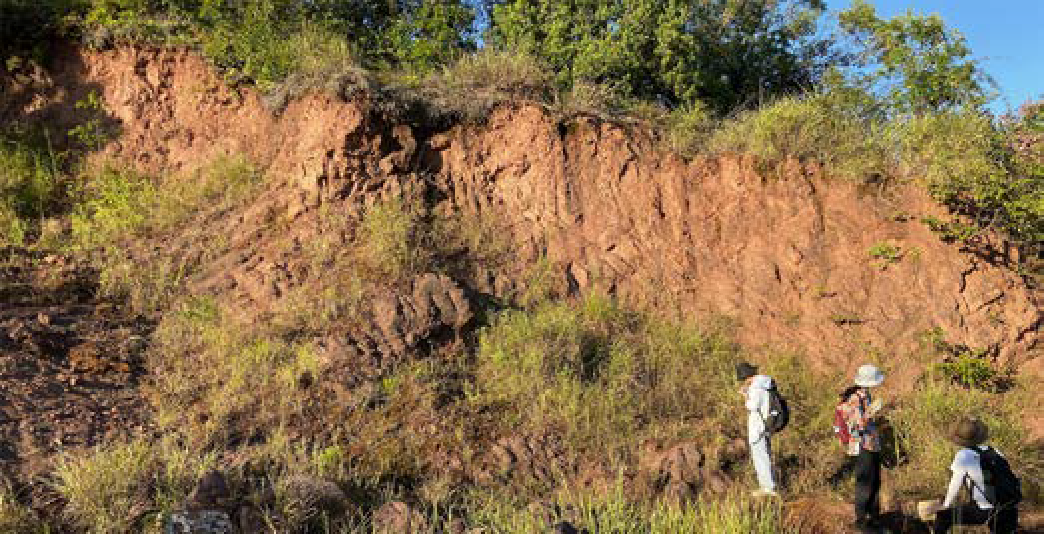
- Outcrops of the Zhoutian Formation in Jiangxi
- Type: Geological formation
- Unit of: Ganzhou Group
- Underlies: Hekou Formation
- Overlies: Maodian Formation
- Thickness: Lower unit: 1,435–1,270 metres (4,708–4,167 ft); Upper unit: 1,270–1,100 metres (4,170–3,610 ft)

Lithology
- Primary: Reddish siltstone, sandstone
- Other: Interbedded halite

Location
- Coordinates: 25°30′26″N 115°46′34″E
- Region: Jiangxi Province
- Country: China

The Zhoutian Formation (Chinese: 周田组; pinyin: zhōu tián zǔ) is a geological formation in Jiangxi, China. It has been dated to the late Cretaceous period, at about 96–90 Ma. Abundant egg fossils are known from the formation, in addition to dinosaurs such as Datai and Gandititan. Invertebrate and plant fossils have also been described from the Zhoutian Formation.

== Geology ==
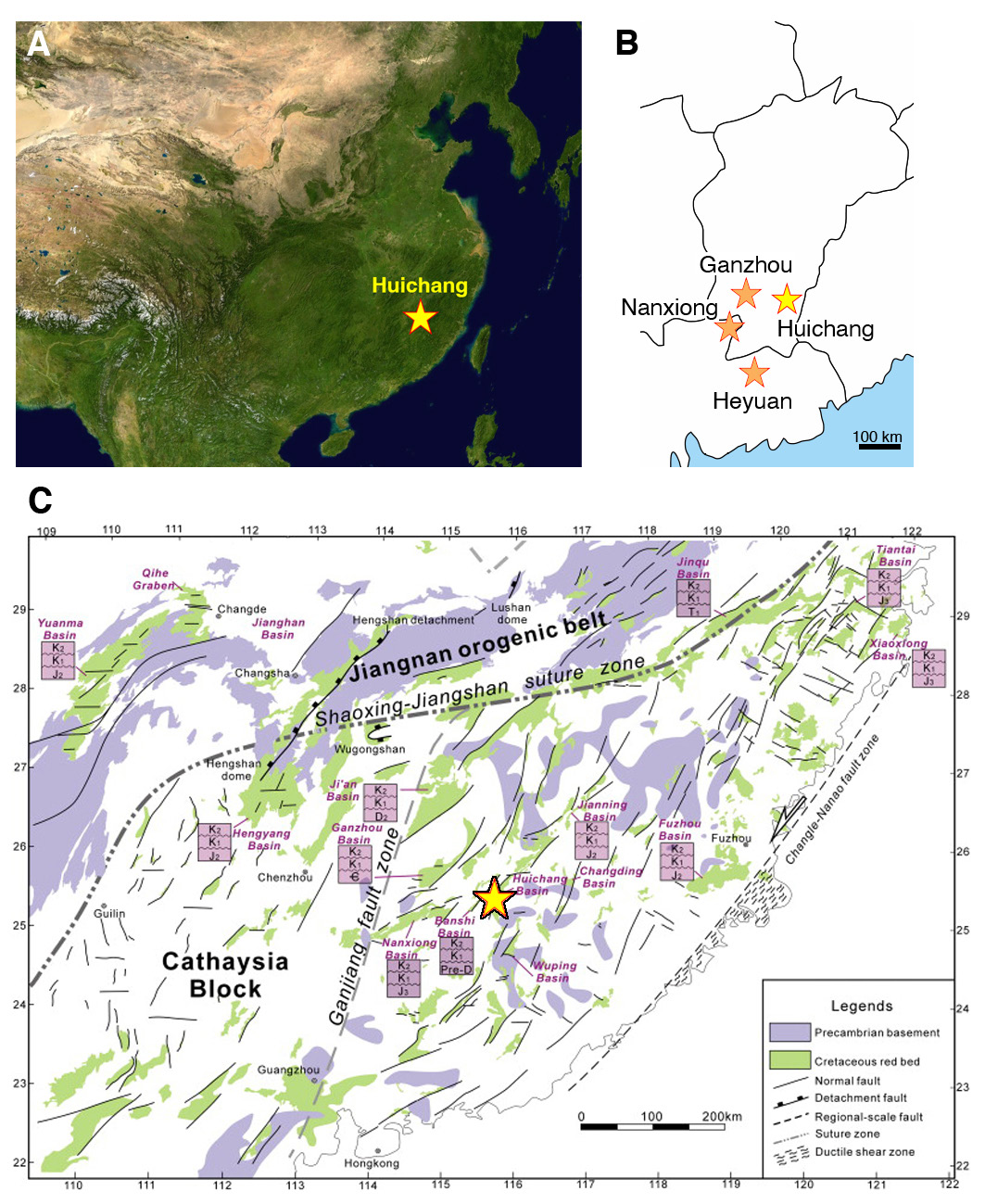
Location and geology of the Zhoutian Formation

Layers of the Zhoutian Formation are characterized by a consistent sandy lithology, typically with mauve (reddish to purplish) hues. Most of the formation alternates between fine calcic sandstone and siltstone layers. In some places, other minerals are interbedded, such as calcium, gypsum, halite, and mirabilite. The Zhoutian Formation dates to around 96–90 million years ago, during the Turonian–early Coniacian ages of the early Late Cretaceous epoch within the Cretaceous period.

=== Stratigraphy ===
The Zhoutian Formation is the upper unit of the Ganzhou Group, overlying the Maodian Formation in that group. The Guifeng Group (beginning with the Hekou Formation) overlies the Zhoutian Formation. These two groups comprise the Ganzhou Basin.

== Paleoenvironment ==
The lower unit of the Zhoutian Formation is suggested to have had a predominantly hot-arid climate, punctuated by two cooling events. The upper unit was likely characterized by a predominantly warm-humid climate with frequent climate fluctuations. The environment has been interpreted as a shallow lacustrine (lake) system. While oviraptorid body fossils have not been found in the Zhoutian Formation, they are among the most common dinosaur fossils found in other similar localities, in addition to occasional sauropod and hadrosaurid fossils.

== Fossil content ==
Color key: Taxon / Reclassified taxon / Taxon falsely reported as present / Dubious taxon or junior synonym / Ichnotaxon / Ootaxon / Morphotaxon

Notes
Uncertain or tentative taxa are in small text
~~crossed out~~ taxa are discredited.

=== Dinosaurs ===
Genus	Species	Region	Material	Notes	Images
Carcharodontosauridae indet.	Indeterminate	Jiangxi	JXGM-F-2023-8 (a tooth)	A tooth with morphological similarities to carcharodontosaurid teeth and tentatively referred to the family.	
Datai	D. yingliangis	Jiangxi	YLSNHM 01002 (holotype) and YLSNHM 01003 (paratype), two articulated, associated specimens including both skulls, as well as some cervical, dorsal, and caudal vertebrae, partial pectoral and pelvic girdles, left arm bones, a partial right femur, ribs, and several osteoderms	An ankylosaurine; possibly closely related to Pinacosaurus	
Gandititan	G. cavocaudatus	Jiangxi	JXGM-F-V1, a series of cervical, dorsal, sacral, and caudal vertebrae, ribs, and a partial right pelvic girdle	A basal titanosaur; closely related to Abdarainurus	

=== Other reptiles ===
Genus	Species	Region	Material	Notes	Images
Pan-Trionychidae indet.	Indeterminate	Jiangxi	CUGW VH245, a nearly-complete carapace with skeletal fragments, including a femur and both ilia, of a juvenile individual	A softshell turtle	

=== Ootaxa ===
Genus	Species	Region	Material	Notes	Images
Wormoolithus	W. luxiensis	Jiangxi	PXMV-0021, a small partial clutch with the remains of at least seven eggs	Classified as belonging to the Similifaveoloolithidae	
Undulatoolithus	U. pengi	Jiangxi	PXMV-0016, a well-preserved clutch of eight eggs	Classified as belonging to the Elongatoolithidae, possibly laid by an oviraptorosaur	
Parafaveoloolithus	P. pingxiangensis	Jiangxi	PXMV-0009-01, a single partial egg	Classified as belonging to the Faveoloolithidae	

=== Invertebrates ===
Genus	Species	Region	Material	Notes	Images
Nemestheria	N. sp.	Jiangxi		A clam shrimp	

=== Plants ===
Genus	Species	Region	Material	Notes	Images
Euonymus	E. sp.	Jiangxi		A flowering plant within the family Celastraceae	
Frenelopsis	F. sp.	Jiangxi		A conifer within the family Cheirolepidiaceae	

== See also ==
- List of stratigraphic units with dinosaur body fossils
- List of stratigraphic units with dinosaur trace fossils
