= Alagteeg Formation =

Stratigraphic Unit in Mongolia

- Stratigraphic range: Santonian-Campanian; ~85–72 Ma
- Type: Geological formation
- Underlies: Djadochta Formation
- Thickness: ~16 m (52 ft) at the Bayan Zag locality

Lithology
- Primary: Sandstone, mudstone

Location
- Coordinates: 44.3°N 103.3°E
- Approximate paleocoordinates: 41.9°N 92.4°E
- Region: Ömnögovi Province
- Country: Mongolia
- Extent: Ulaan Nuur Basin

Type section
- Named for: Alag Teeg
- Named by: Hasegawa et al.
- Year defined: 2009
- Thickness at type section: ~15 m (49 ft)
- Alagteeg Formation (Mongolia)

The Alagteeg Formation is a geological formation in Mongolia whose strata date back to the Late Cretaceous. Dinosaur remains are among the fossils that have been recovered from the formation. It predominantly consists of alternating reddish brown mudstone and horizontally laminated sandstone, with ripple cross laminations and rhizoliths. It was first formally defined as a unit by Hasegawa et al. in 2008 as a distinct unit from the overlying Djadochta Formation. The environment of deposition is suggested to be fluvial, originating in a sandy braided river, floodplain and ephemeral lake depositional environments, as opposed to the desert depositional environment of the Djadochta Formation.

== Fossil content ==
Color key: Taxon / Reclassified taxon / Taxon falsely reported as present / Dubious taxon or junior synonym / Ichnotaxon / Ootaxon / Morphotaxon	Notes; Uncertain or tentative taxa are in small text; ~~crossed out~~ taxa are discredited.

=== Dinosaurs ===
==== Sauropoda ====
Genus	Species	Location	Stratigraphic position	Material	Notes	Images
Abdarainurus	A. barsboldi				A titanosaurian sauropod	

==== Ornithischians ====
Genus	Species	Location	Stratigraphic position	Material	Notes	Images
Pinacosaurus	P. grangeri				A ankylosaurid thyreophoran	
Plesiohadros	P. djadokhtaensis				A hadrosauroid ornithopod	
Protoceratops	P. andrewsi				A protoceratopsid ceratopsian	

=== Turtles ===
Turtles of the Alagteeg Formation
Genus	Species	Location	Stratigraphic position	Material	Notes	Images
Trionychidae Indet.	Indeterminate					

== See also ==
- List of dinosaur-bearing rock formations
