= Flaming Cliffs =

Region of the Gobi Desert, Mongolia

Coordinates: 44°08′18.66″N 103°43′40.02″E

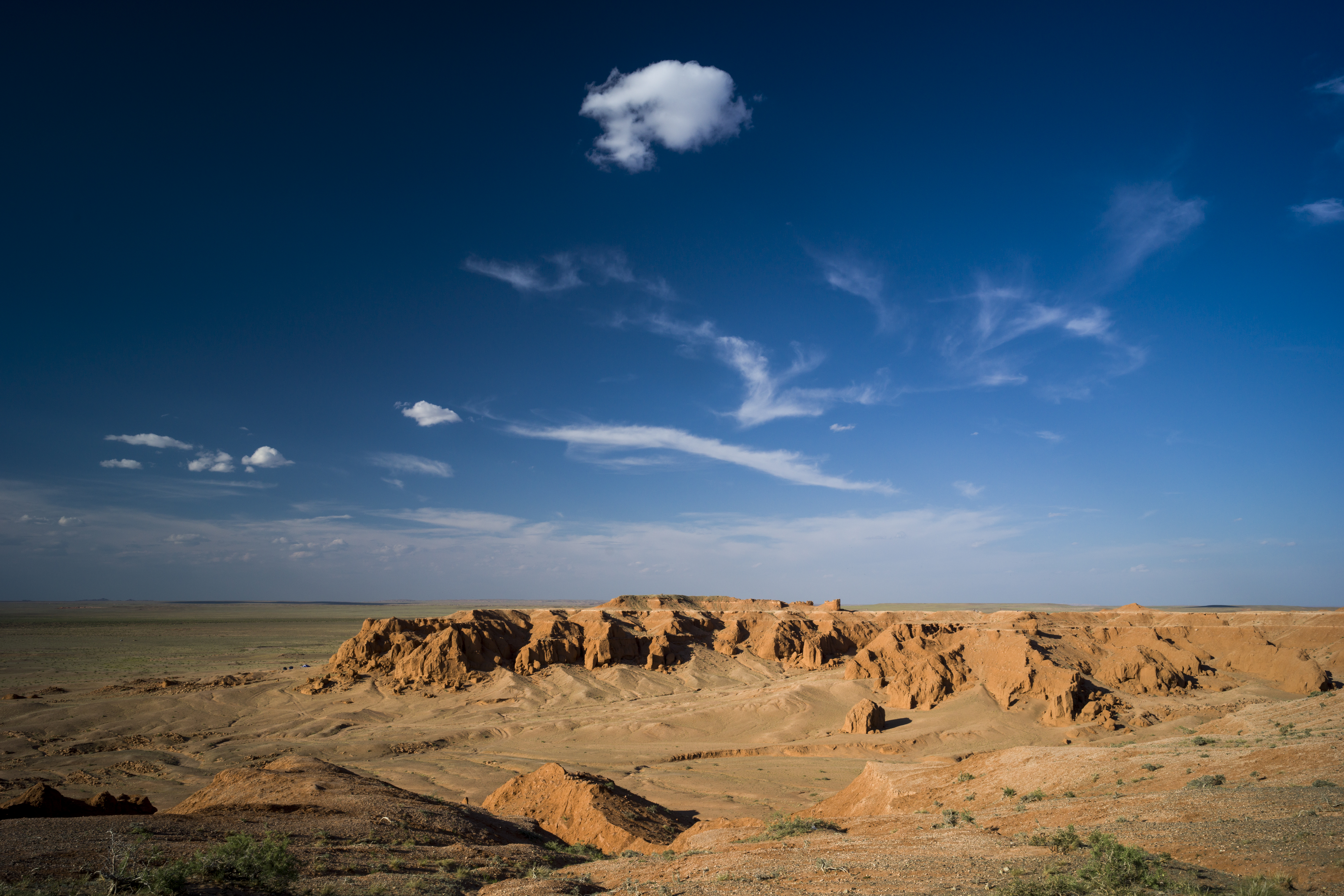
Far view of the Flaming Cliffs

The Flaming Cliffs site (also known as Bayanzag, Bayn Dzak) (Mongolian: Баянзаг rich in saxaul), with the alternative Mongolian name of Mongolian: Улаан Эрэг (red cliffs), is a region of the Gobi Desert in the Ömnögovi Province of Mongolia, in which important fossil finds have been made. It was given this name by American paleontologist Roy Chapman Andrews, who visited in the 1920s. The area is most famous for yielding the first discovery of dinosaur eggs. Other finds in the area include specimens of Velociraptor and eutherian mammals. It exposes rocks of the Djadochta Formation. It is illegal to remove fossils from the area without appropriate permits.

The nickname refers to the red or orange color of the sandstone cliffs (especially at a sunset).

== Dinosaur bones/fossils ==
The following are dinosaur fossils that have been found in the Flaming Cliffs.

Theropods:

- Maniraptorans: Archaeornithoides, Velociraptor, Saurornithoides, Oviraptor

Ornithischians

- Ceratopsians: Protoceratops
- Ankylosaurids: Pinacosaurus
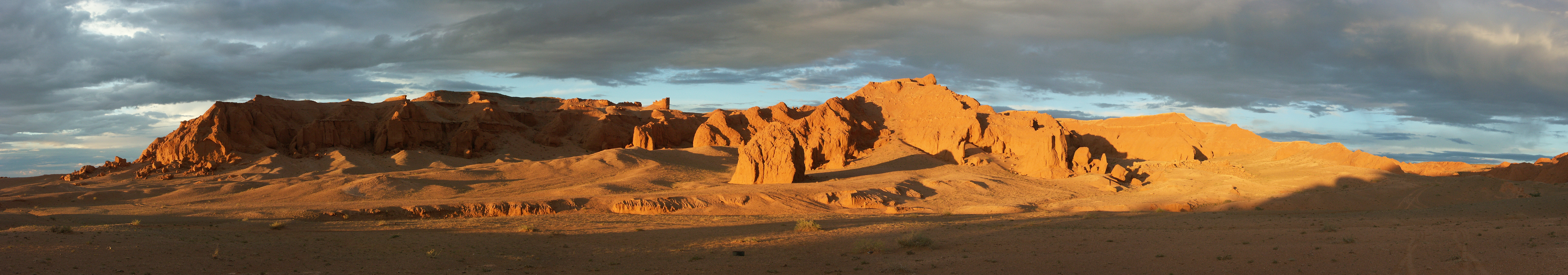
