= Djadochta Formation =

Geologic formation in Mongolia

- Stratigraphic range: Late Cretaceous Campanian–Maastrichtian
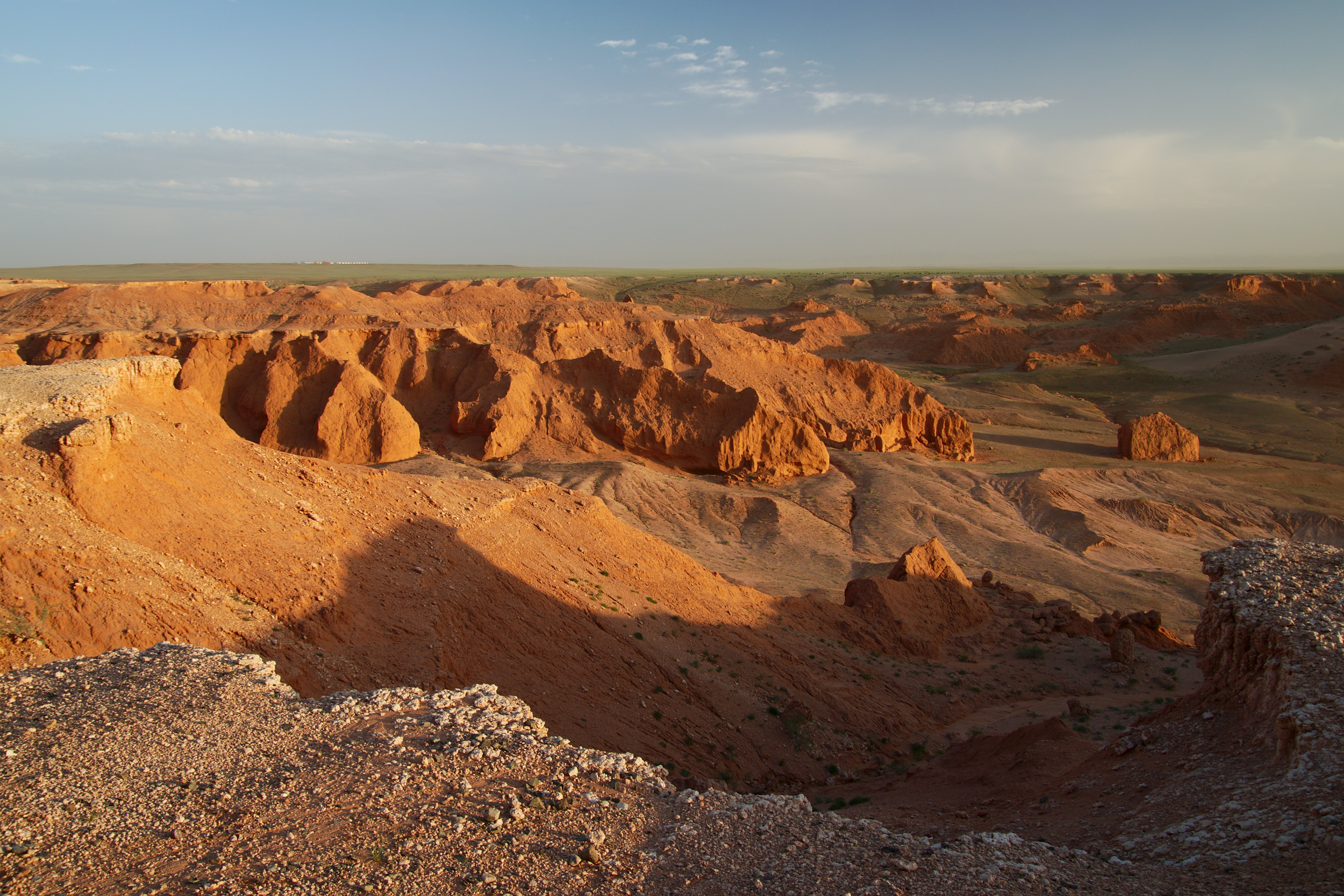
- Bayn Dzak (Flaming Cliffs), the type locality of the Djadochta Formation
- Type: Geological formation
- Unit of: Shamo Group
- Sub-units: Bayn Dzak Member, Tugrugyin Member
- Underlies: Khashaat Formation
- Overlies: Alagteeg Formation
- Area: Nemegt Basin, Ulan Nur Basin
- Thickness: over 90 m (300 ft)

Lithology
- Primary: Sandstone
- Other: Mudstone

Location

Type section
- Named for: Shabarakh Usu (Bayn Dzak)
- Named by: Berkey & Morris
- Location: Flaming Cliffs
- Year defined: 1927
- Coordinates: 44°08′19″N 103°43′40″E
- Approximate paleocoordinates: 30.7°N 9.2°E
- Region: Ömnögov
- Country: Mongolia
- Thickness at type section: about 90 m (300 ft)
- Djadochta Formation (Mongolia)

The Djadochta Formation (sometimes transcribed and also known as Djadokhta, Djadokata, or Dzhadokhtskaya) is a highly fossiliferous geological formation in Central Asia, Gobi Desert, dating from the Late Cretaceous period, during the Campanian to the Maastrichtian. The type locality is the Bayn Dzak locality, famously known as the Flaming Cliffs. Reptile (including dinosaur) and mammal remains are among the fossils recovered from the formation.

== Excavation history ==
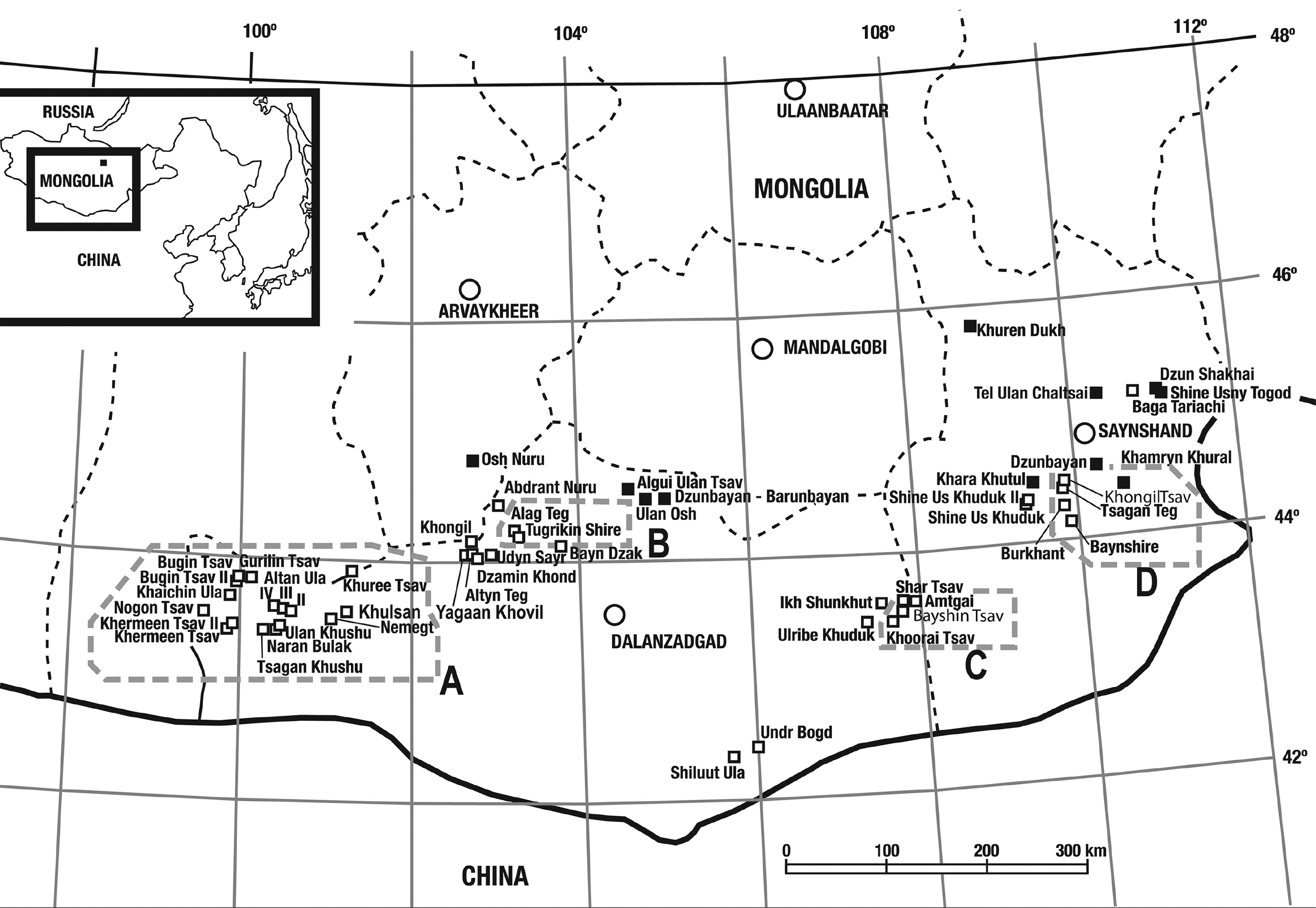
Cretaceous-aged dinosaur fossil localities of Mongolia. Djadochta localities at area B.

The Djadochta Formation was first documented and explored—though only a single locality—during paleontological expeditions of the American Museum of Natural History in 1922–1925, which were part of the Central Asiatic expeditions. The expeditions were led by Roy Chapman Andrews, in company of Walter Willis Granger as chief paleontologist and field team. The team did extensive exploration at the Bayn Dzak (formerly Shabarakh Usu) region, which they nicknamed flaming cliffs, given that at sunset the sediments of this locality had a characteristic reddish color. Notable finds included the first known fossils of Oviraptor, Protoceratops, Saurornithoides, and Velociraptor, the first confirmed dinosaur eggs (a partial nest of Oviraptor), as well as fossil mammals. Some of these were briefly described by Henry Fairfield Osborn during the ongoing years of the expeditions. In 1927 the formation was formally described and established by Berkey and Morris, with Bayn Dzak as the type locality.

In 1963 the Mongolian paleontologist Demberelyin Dashzeveg reported the discovery of a new fossiliferous locality of the Djadochta Formation: Tugriken Shireh. During the 1960s to 1970s, Polish-Mongolian and Russian-Mongolian paleontological expeditions collected new, partial to complete specimens of Protoceratops and Velociraptor at this locality, making these dinosaur species a common occurrence in Tugriken Shireh. Some of the most notable excavations made at Tugriken Shireh include the Fighting Dinosaurs (Protoceratops and Velociraptor locked in combat), and abundant articulated, in situ (in the original pose), and sometimes complete skeletons of Protoceratops.

During the 1980s a joint Soviet-Mongolian paleontological expedition discovered several Mesozoic fossil-rich localities in the Gobi Desert of Mongolia. Among these sites, Udyn Sayr was discovered and examined by the expedition, regarding its age as Late Cretaceous. This new locality was predominantly rich in avimimid fossils, with a lesser abundance of mammal and other dinosaur fossils.

In 1993 a collaborative expedition by the Mongolian Academy of Sciences and the American Museum of Natural History discovered a new fossil site within the Djadochta Formation, named Ukhaa Tolgod, which translates to "Brown Hills." This site has yielded a significant number of well-preserved fossils, including those of mammals, dinosaurs, lizards, and eggs. Most specimens are found in near-complete articulation, indicating excellent preservation conditions. Compared to other Mesozoic fossil sites, Ukhaa Tolgod stands out for its high fossil diversity.

== Description ==
The modern-day Djadochta Formation is set in an arid habitat of sand dunes with little freshwater apart from oases and arroyos, in the Gobi Desert. The dominant lithology of the Djadochta Formation is represented by non-marine, cemented reddish-orange and pale orange to light gray, medium to fine-grained sands and sandstones, which include minor deposits of calcareous concretions and orange-brown silty clay. Less abundant sedimentation comprises conglomerates, siltstones, fluvial (water-deposited) sandstones, and mudstones. The entire thickness of the formation in the Ulan Nur Basin is at least 80 m (260 ft). Several aeolian processes (wind works) indicate the presence of large straight-crested dune-like structures, and smaller barchan (crescent-shaped) and parabolic (poorly U-shaped) dunes across the formation. Reddish sandstones are observed in numerous localities.

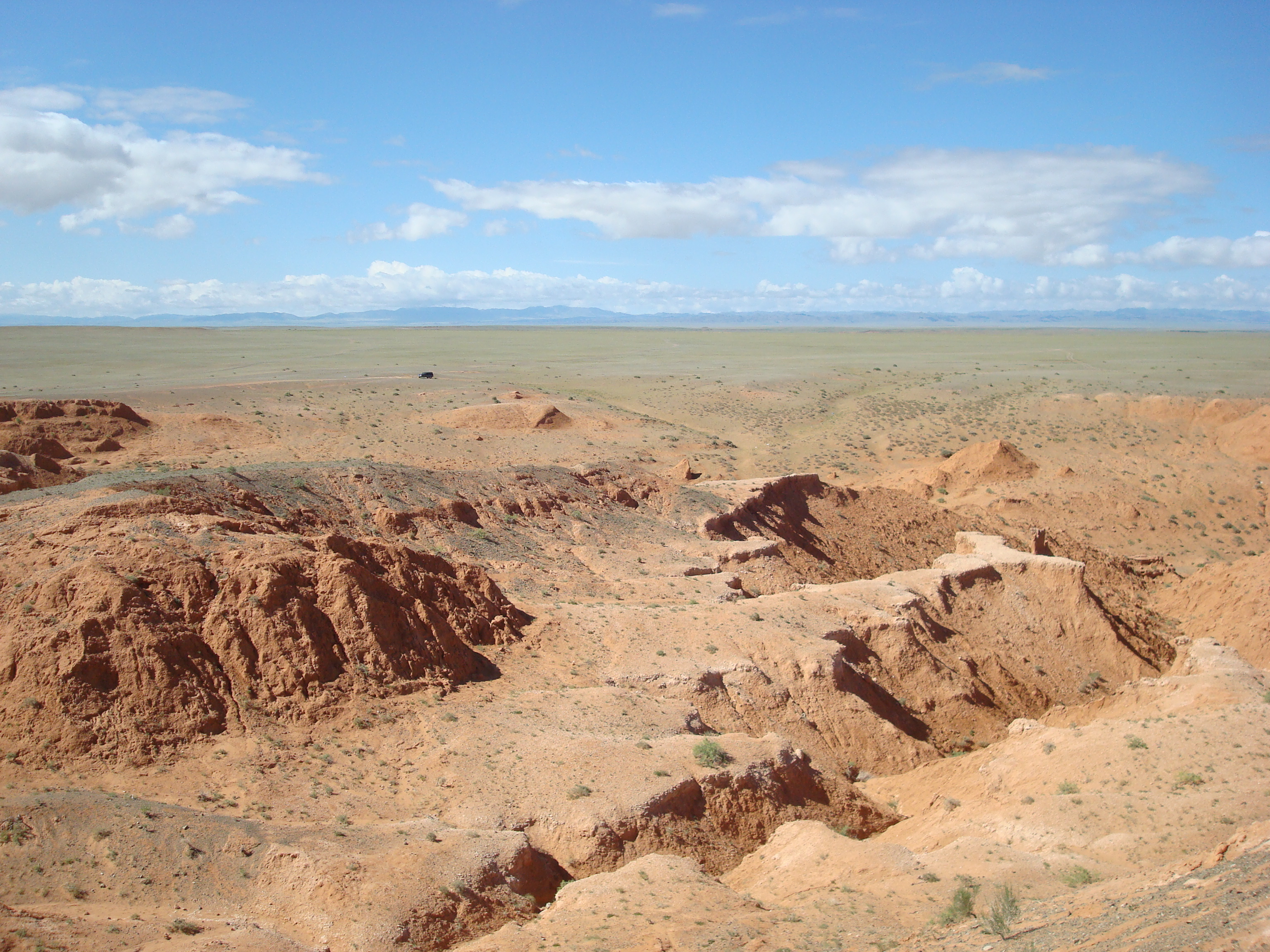
Exposures at the Flaming Cliffs

- Bayn Dzak (also spelled Bain Dzak, Bayanzag, Bayn Zag, Bayan Zag, or Shabarakh Usu; locally known as Flaming Cliffs): It is dominated by reddish-orange sandstones and well-sorted, unbedded, and medium-grained sands. The thickness of the strata at the Flaming Cliffs at least more than 30 m (98 ft). Less abundant lithology of Bayn Dzak includes cemented and poorly-cemented siltstones, mudstones, and grayish conglomerates. The latter are better exposed at western escarpments of the Flaming Cliffs. Bayn Dzak is about 90 m (300 ft) in total thickness and can be divided into two sections: alternations of horizontally-bedded sandstone and mudstone in the lowermost part, and sandstone-dominated successions in the upper or main part.
- Tugriken Shireh (also spelled Tugrik, Toogreeg, Toogreek, Tugreek, Tugrug, Turgrugyin, Tugrugeen, Tögrögiin, Tugrikiin, or Tugrikin): This locality is about 30 m (98 ft) in thickness and characterized by poorly cemented, fine-grained sandstones that have colors varying from pink to yellowish-white. The predominant mineral is quartz, and lesser common minerals are represented by feldspars and lithic fragments. Both cross-stratified and structureless sandstones are scattered across Tugriken Shireh.
- Udyn Sayr (also spelled Udan Sayr, Udan Sair, Ulaan Sair, or Üüden Sair): Sediments of this locality are exposed across a region of more than 60 km^{2} (23 mi^{2}). It is divided into lower (thickness of at least more than 10 m (33 ft)) and upper (thickness of about 50 m (160 ft)) beds. The lower beds are fluvial originated and dominated by sandstones and mudstones. The upper beds are likely of aeolian origin and consist of reddish, cross-stratified and structureless sandstones.
- Ukhaa Tolgod (also spelled Oka Tolga): The strata exposed at Ukhaa Tolgod is dominated by reddish sandstones, with some sandstones containing small amounts of conglomeratic lenses and/or cobbles and pebbles. Conglomerate itself is in this site, and to a lesser level are mudstones and siltstones, which are thin and laterally restricted. Cross-stratified and fine-structured sandstones are particularly abundant at Ukhaa Tolgod.
- Zamyn Khondt (also spelled Dzamyn Khondt, Zamin Khond, or Dzamin Khond): This locality is characterized by reddish, well-sorted, and fine-grained sandstones with calcareous concretions. Some aeolian beds are present and are finely stratified to massive, having a visible thickness of about 20 m (66 ft).

== Stratigraphy and age ==
The Djadochta Formation occurs in the Late Cretaceous period of the Campanian and Early Maastrichtian stages. Magnetostratigraphic datings from 2006 initially suggested a Campanian age for the formation. But that same study indicated their findings could not be completely substantiated. More recent studies have suggested that the Djadochta, Barun Goyot and Nemegt Formations might instead represent different contemporary environments instead of strict temporal succession from each other. If the Djadochta Formation is the same age as the Nemegt Formation, it would be Maastrichtian in age. Because of this uncertainty, the age of the Djadochta is most parsimoniously Campanian to Maastrichtian.

The upper boundary of the Djadokhta strata has been identified at the erosional surface overlain by gravels of the Palestine Khashaat (Gashoto) Formation.

The Djadochta Formation is separated into a lower Bayn Dzak Member and an upper Turgrugyin Member, which represent very similar depositional environments. Further strata from the Bayn Dzak Member includes that of the Ukhaa Tolgod locality, and its overall age is regarded also within the Campanian. Based on the superposition of the members, the Tugrugyin Member overlies the Bayn Dzak Member making it somewhat younger, which indicates that the Bayn Dzak paleofauna lived somewhat earlier than that from Tugriken Shireh. However, it is not yet understood the precise temporal difference: Localities within the Djadochta Formation are considered to represent a sequence of progressively younger sediments and thereby paleofaunas. Ukhaa Tolgod may be younger than both Bayn Dzak and Tugriken Shireh. Based on their fossil record and strata, Udyn Sayr and Zamyn Khondt have been correlated with other Djadokhta localities, though fossils of Udyn Sayr may indicate that this locality is younger than Bayn Dzak and Tugriken Shireh.

Examinations on the strata of the Alag Teg (also spelled Alag Teeg or Alag Teer) locality, once considered part of this formation, indicates that it belongs to a different geological formation: the Alagteeg Formation, which is slightly older than the overlying Djadochta Formation. Based on sediments and stratigraphic relationships, the lower part of the Bayn Dzak locality is correlated with the Alag Teg locality, making both sections part of the Alagteeg Formation. The upper or main part of the former locality is considered part of the Djadochta Formation itself, as it shares similar lithology and stratigraphic relationships with Tugriken Shireh.

Stratigraphy of the Djadochta Formation
Formation	Time period	Member	Lithology	Thickness	Image
Barun Goyot	Early Maastrichtian		Poorly cemented, fine and medium-grained red to reddish-brown sandstones.	~110 m (360 ft)	
Djadochta	Campanian				
Djadochta	Campanian	Turgrugyin	Pale orange to light gray (sometimes yellowish-white) sands and sandstones.	30 m (98 ft)	
Djadochta	Campanian	Bayn Dzak	Reddish-orange, crossbedded, and structureless sandstones, with minor deposits of brown siltstones and mudstones.	90 m (300 ft)	
Alagteeg	Early Campanian; Santonian	"lower Bayn Dzak"	Alternating reddish brown mudstone and horizontally laminated sandstone, with ripple cross laminations and rhizoliths.	~15 m (49 ft)	

== Depositional environment ==
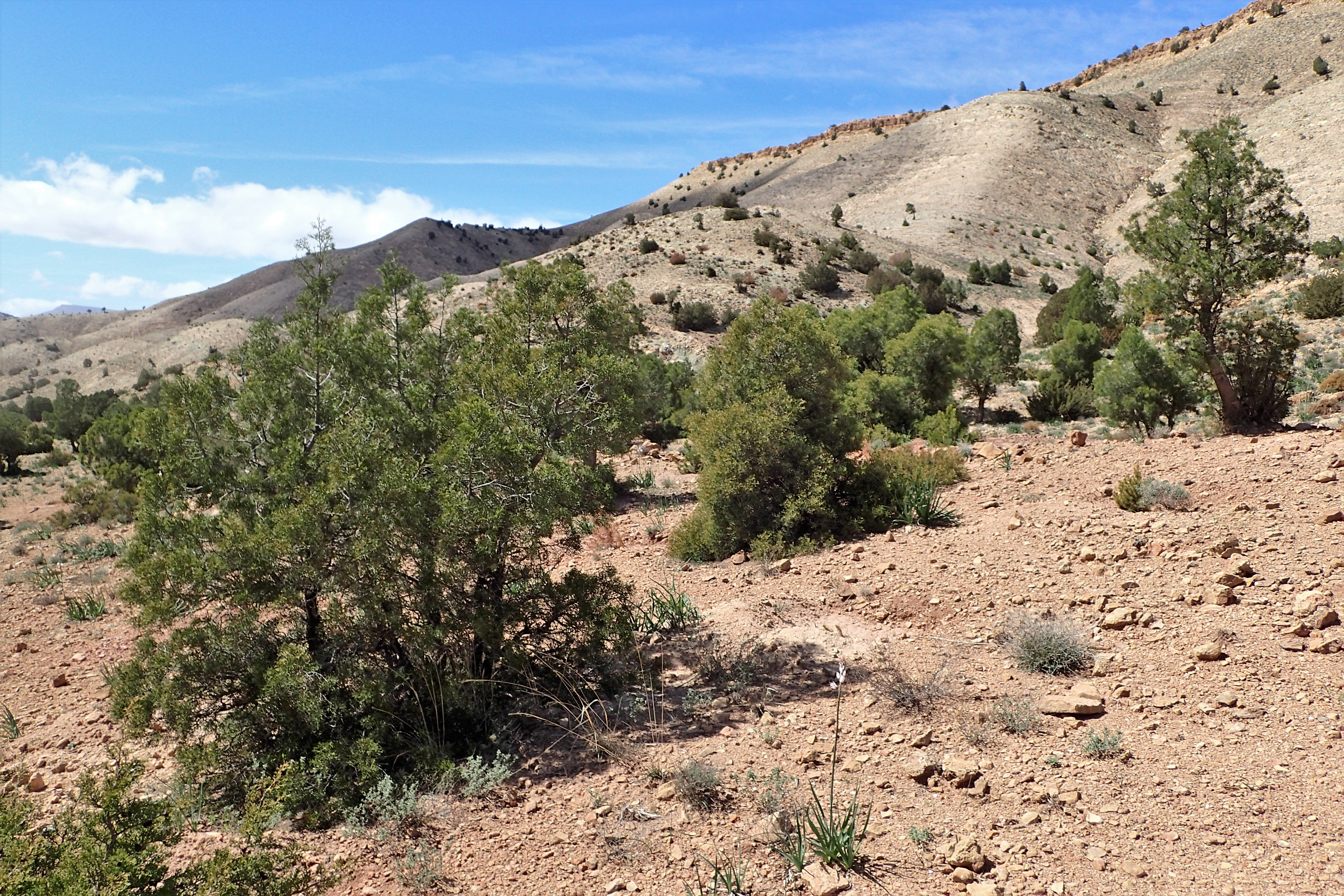
The Djadochta Formation has been compared to semi-arid ecosystems of North Africa and the Levant, such as this arid scrub in Morocco, which also supports conifer growth as seen here.

Based on strata and rock facies (such as sandstones and caliche) of the formation and coeval units (Bayan Mandahu) it is currently agreed that sediments of the Djadochta Formation were deposited by wind activity in arid paleoenvironments comprising sand dunes with a warm semi-arid climate. Fluvial sedimentation at the Ukhaa Tolgod locality indicates the presence of short-lived water bodies during the times of the formation, which also contributed to its deposition. Floodplains may have also existed. The area has been compared to the Kalahari Desert in Botswana as well as to the desert ecosystems of North Africa and Western Asia. There is still evidence of plant life that may inhabited these semi-arid dunes. These come in the form of Radicites which may have been left overs from a Conifer. Low growing bushes may have also existed.

Soil evidence indicates that summers were hot and dry while winters were probably short and humid.

=== Taphonomy ===
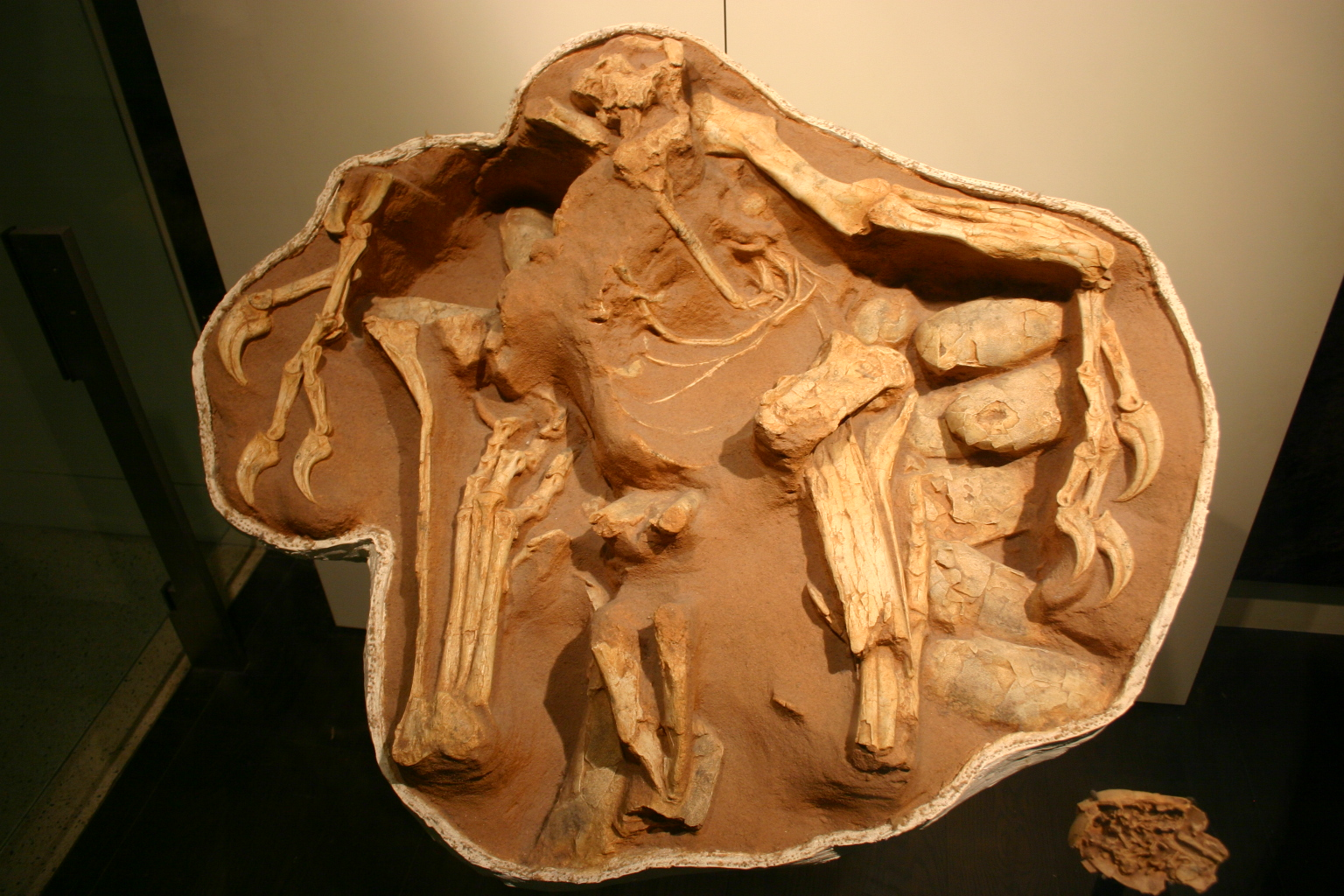
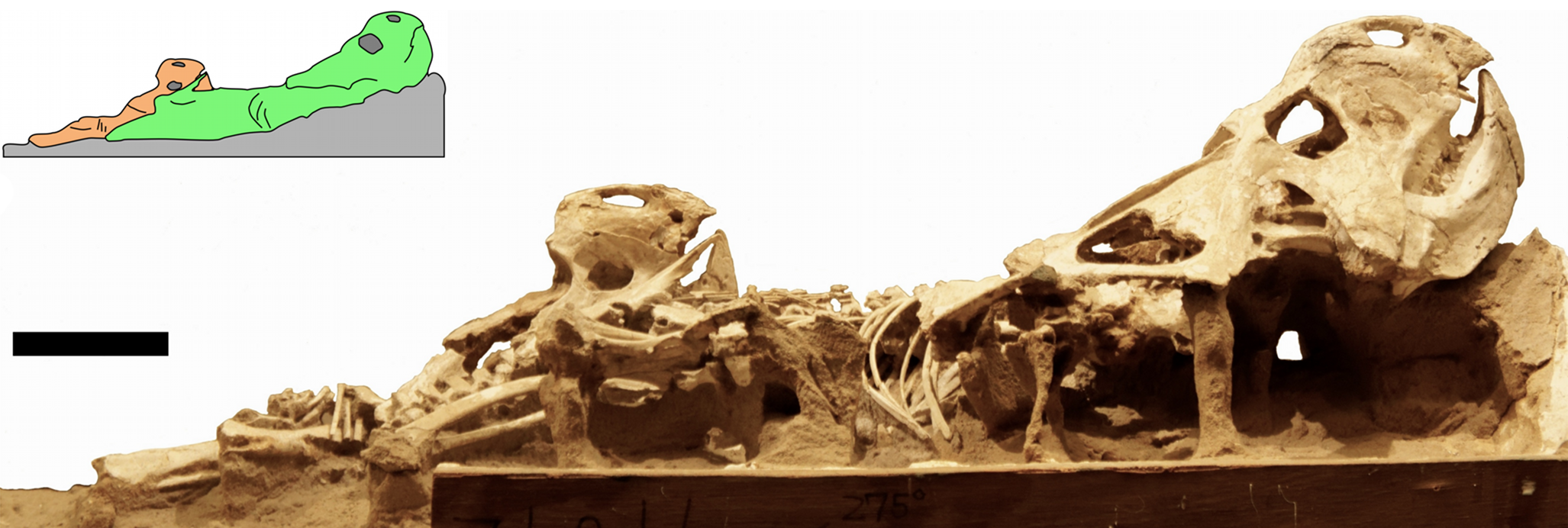
Examples of the Djadochta Formation preservation: articulated Citipati (top) and Protoceratops (bottom) specimens

A vast majority of articulated specimens from the Djadochta Formation are found in unstructured sandstones, indicating burial in situ by high-energy sand-bearing events. Some buried Protoceratops individuals are preserved in distinctive postures involving the body and head arched upwards, suggesting that the animals died in the process of trying to free themselves from the body of sand, where they eventually fossilized. As they were unable to escape burial, the sandy mass prevented carcasses from being scavenged by vertebrates. Most of these "buried" specimens are found with bite traces and large borings (tunnel-like holes made by small invertebrates) on bone joints areas and other surfaces, indicating that after death they were largely scavenged by invertebrates, such as skin beetles.

It has been suggested that the repeated occurrence of these feeding traces at limb joints may reflect that the responsible scavengers focused on collagen at the joint cartilage of dried dinosaur carcasses as a source of nitrogen, which was very low in the arid Djadochta Formation environments.

Examinations at the fossil preservation and sediments of Ukhaa Tolgod indicates that preserved animals were buried alive by catastrophic dune collapses. It is thought to have occurred when sand dunes became oversaturated with water resulting in their sudden downfall; heavy rainfall events likely acted as the triggering mechanism for this collapse. Examples from the Ukhaa Tolgod preservation include Citipati (brooding adults entombed atop nests and eggs); Khaan (a pair in close proximity likely killed by a single collapse event); and Saichangurvel (individual buried alive by a muddy dune).

== Paleobiota ==
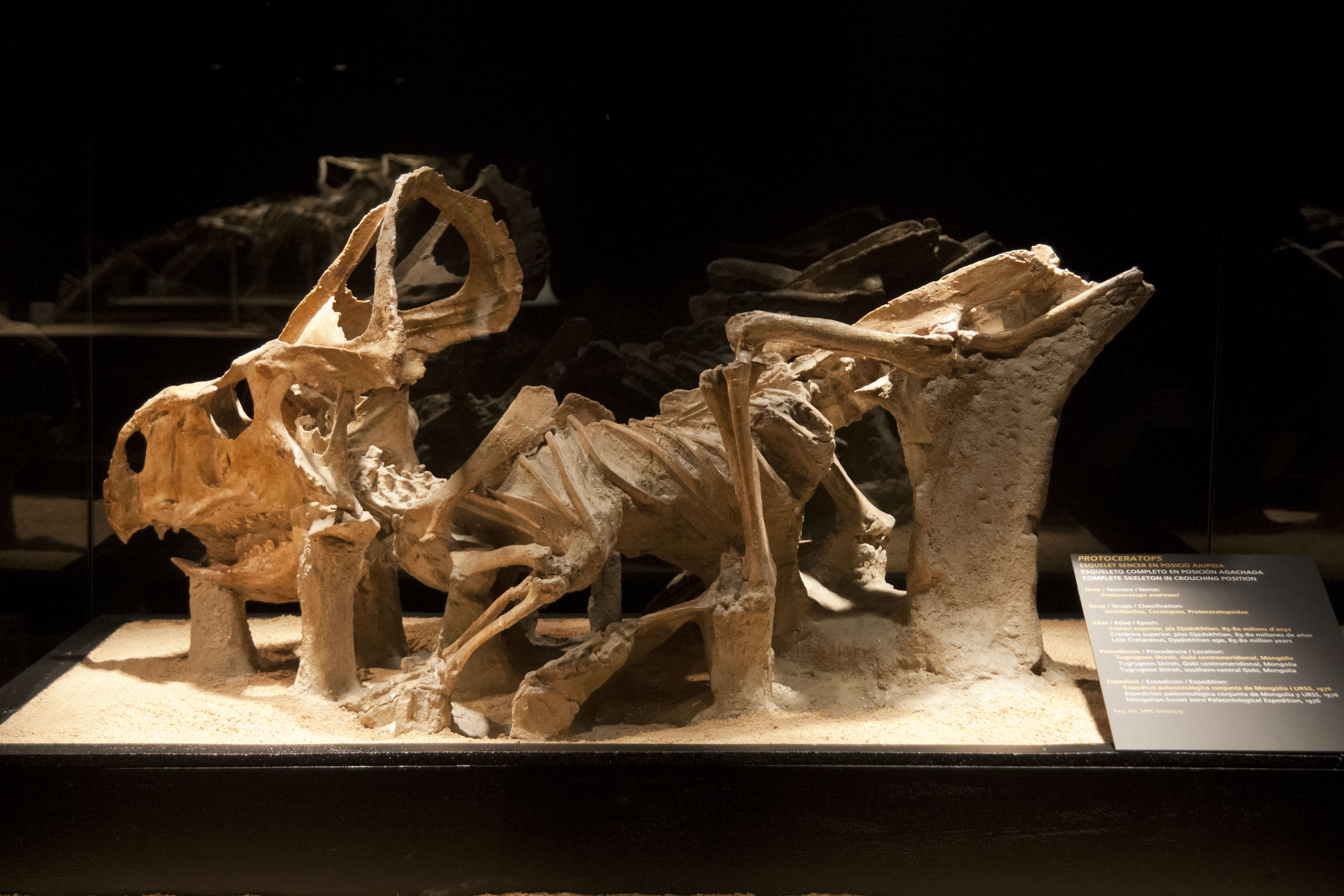
Articulated Protoceratops from Tugriken Shireh. This dinosaur is one of the most common occurrences in the Djadochta Formation

Among fossils, Protoceratops is extremely common in Djadochta localities. Bayn Dzak is reported as one of the localities with the highest concentration of Protoceratops fossils and has been noted as the "Protoceratops fauna". Adjacent to Bayn Dzak, at Tugriken Shireh, Protoceratops is also abundant. Other common dinosaur components of the paleofauna include Pinacosaurus and Velociraptor. Small vertebrates like lizards and mammals are rather abundant and diverse, with Adamisaurus and Kryptobaatar being the most abundant representatives. The paleofauna of the Djadochta Formation is very similar in composition to the nearby and coeval-regarded Bayan Mandahu Formation of Inner Mongolia. The two formations share many of the same genera, but differ in species. For instance, the most common mammal in Djadochta is Kryptobaatar dashzevegi, while in Bayan Mandahu it is the closely related K. mandahuensis. Similarly, the dinosaur fauna of Djadochta includes Protoceratops andrewsi and Velociraptor mongoliensis, which Bayan Mandahu yields P. hellenikorhinus and V. osmolskae.

Although fossil plants are extremely rare in the Djadochta Formation, the great abundancy of herbivorous Protoceratops at the arid-deposited Tugriken Shireh locality indicates that it had a moderate coverage of bushes or other low-growing plants.

The relatively low paleobiodiversity and climate settings of the Djadochta suggest that these conditions contributed to stressed paleoenvironments. Most of the fossil occurrences in the formation are occupied by Protoceratops, and small to medium-sized ankylosaurs, oviraptorids, and dromaeosaurids make much of the overall paleofauna. Large-bodied animals are absent or extremely rare in the formation. Comparisons with the Nemegt Formation further reflects stressed paleoenvironments. In contrast to Djadochta, Nemegt has yielded an extensive diversity of large dinosaur taxa, such as Deinocheirus, Nemegtosaurus, Saurolophus, Tarbosaurus, or Therizinosaurus. Most of these taxa are herbivorous, which combined with the mesic (well-watered) settings of the Nemegt Formation allowed the development of giant herbivores, in contrast to the stressed Djadochta Formation. Another indicative of stressed paleoenvironments is the almost non-existent amount of fully aquatic animals. Turtles are rarely recovered, and most are terrestrial such as Zangerlia. It is suggested that most of the fragmented hadrosaur, tyrannosaur and sauropod remains across the formation likely belong to non-endemic, passing by species.

== Gallery ==
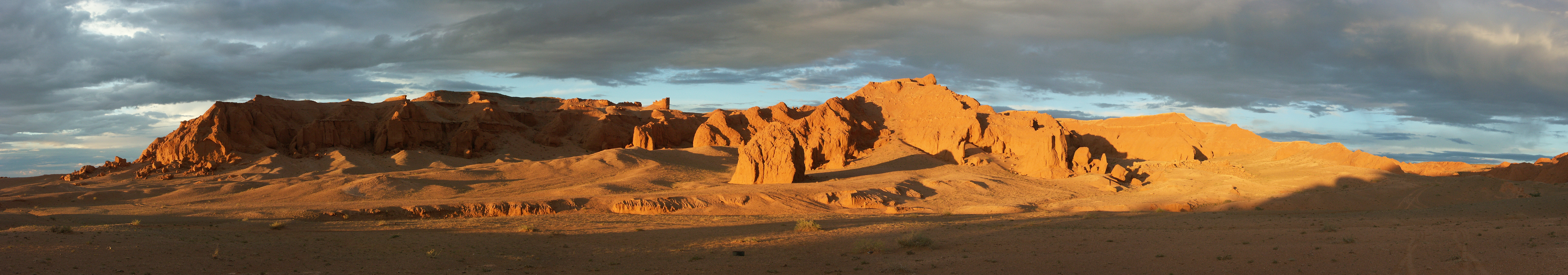
Panoramic view of the Flaming Cliffs (Bayn Dzak), type locality of the Djadochta Formation
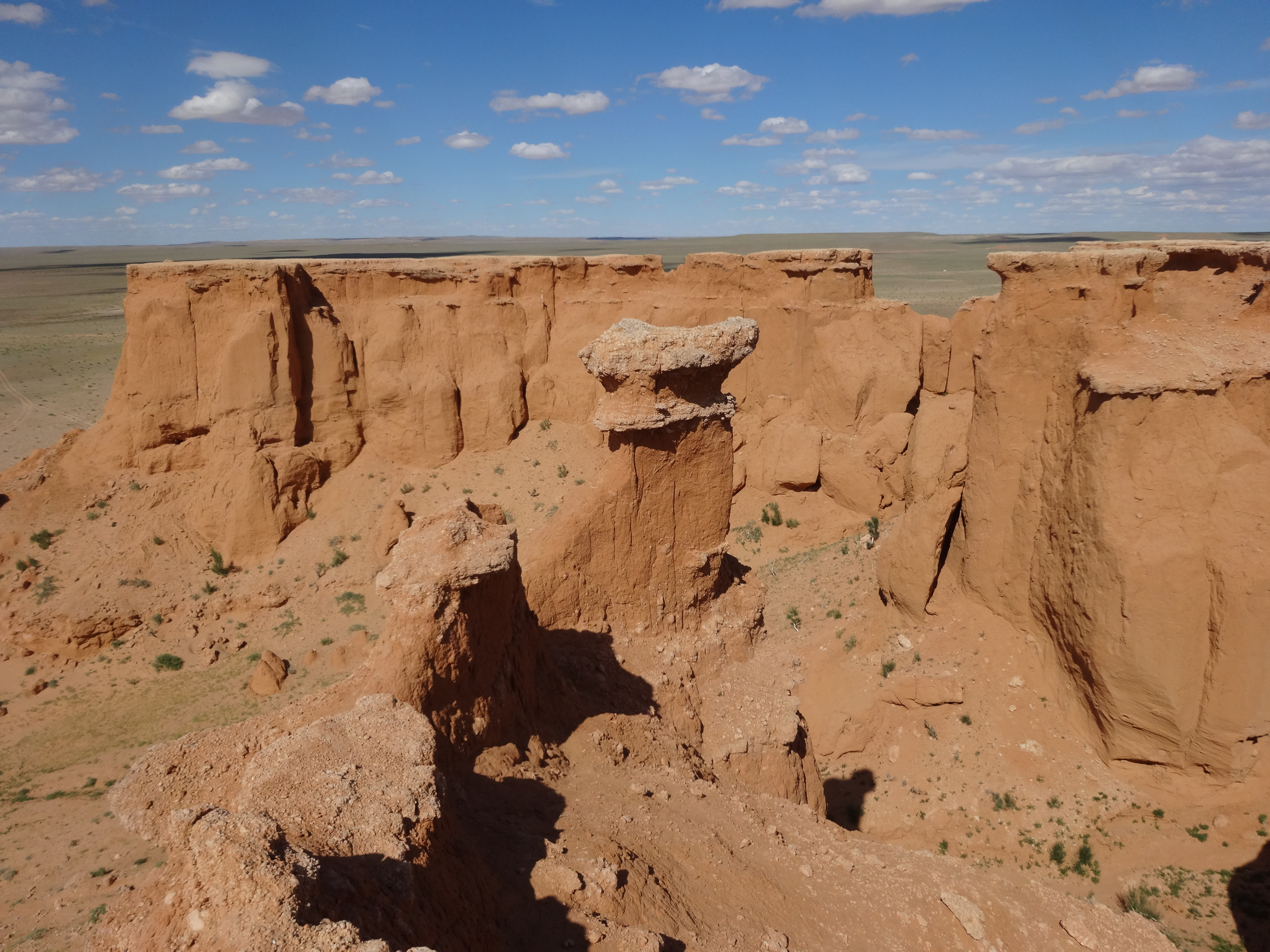

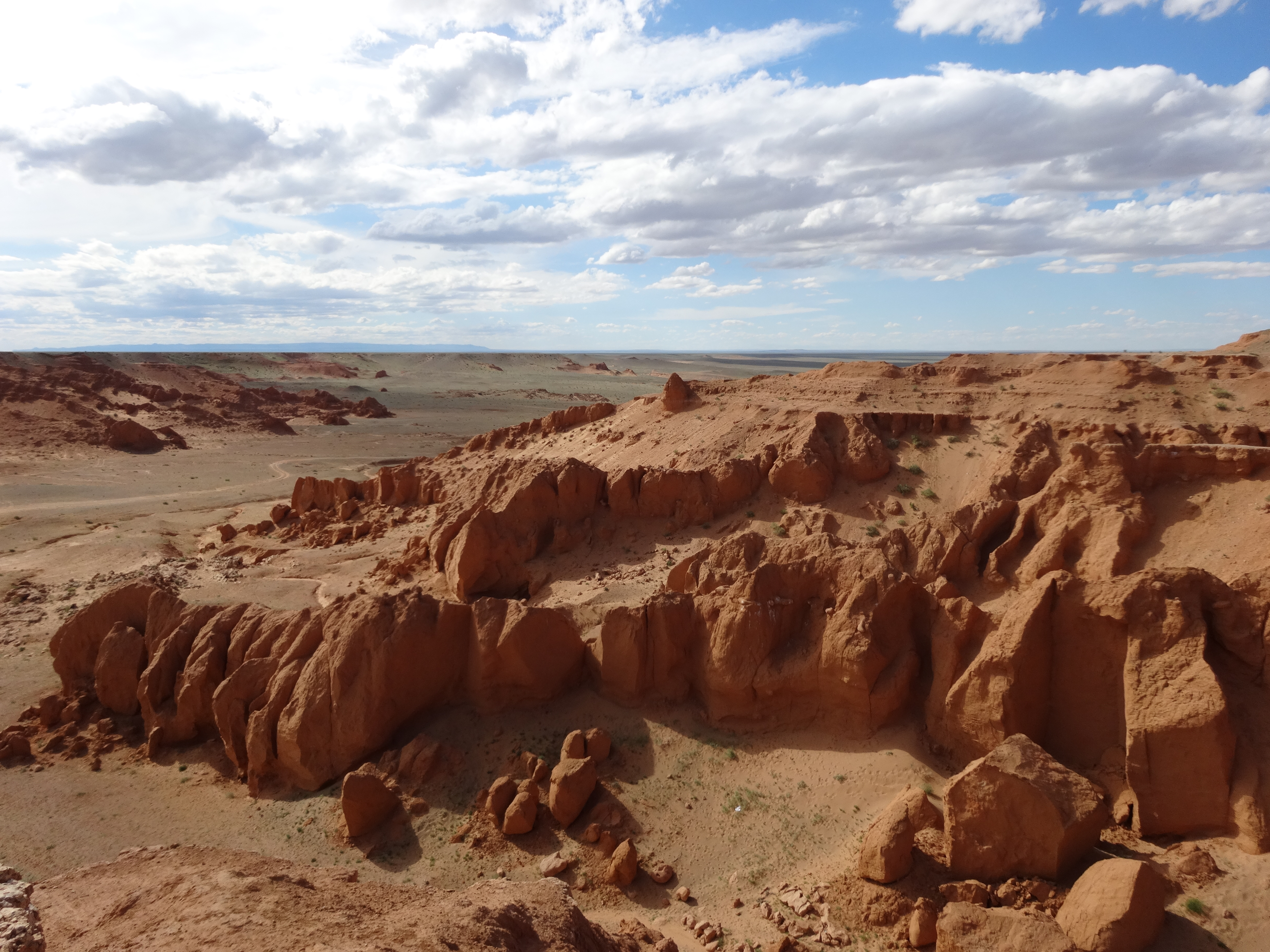

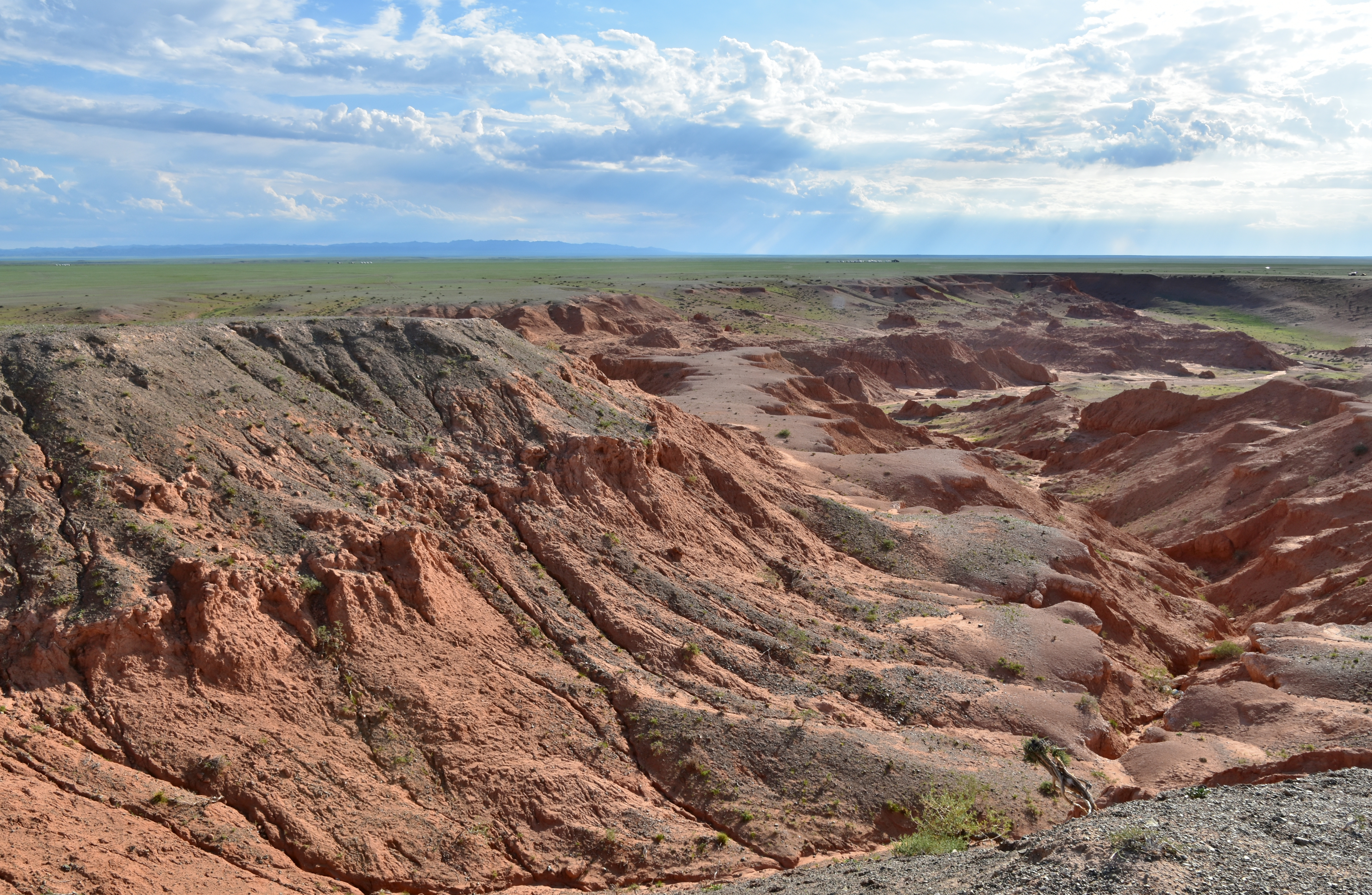

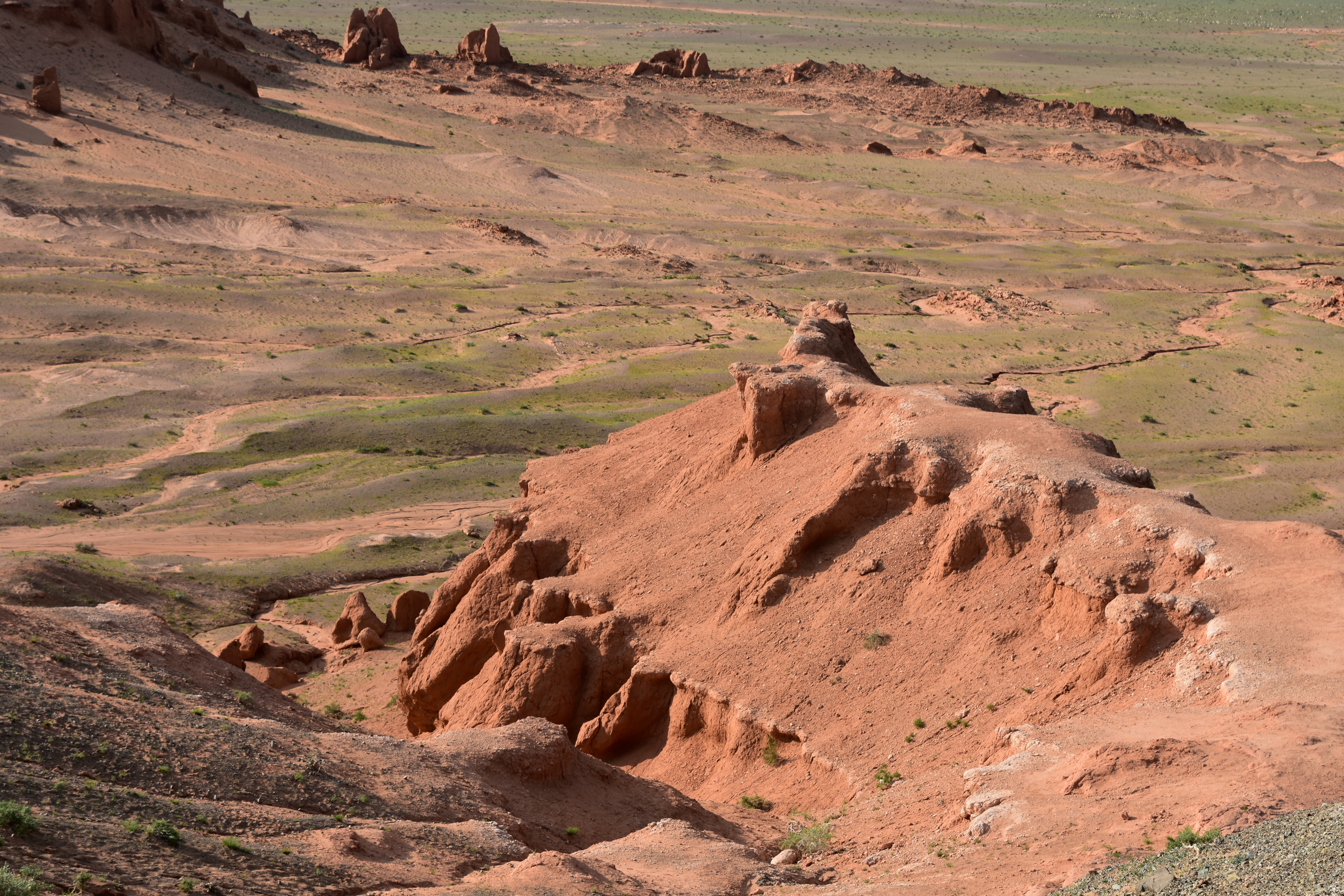

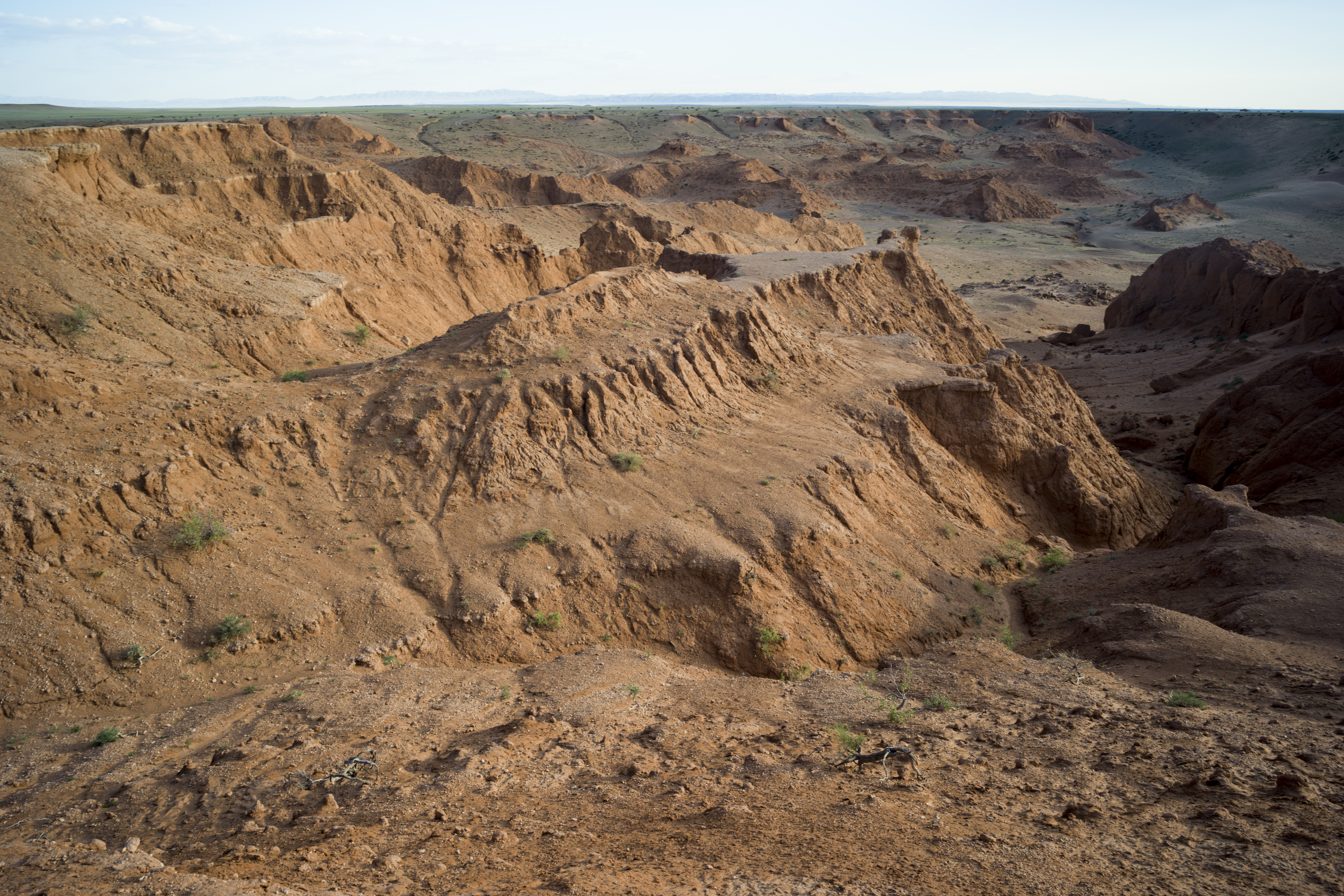

== See also ==
- List of dinosaur-bearing rock formations
- List of fossil sites (with link directory)
- Barun Goyot Formation – Geological formation in Mongolia
- Bayan Mandahu Formation – Geological formation in China
- Nemegt Formation – Geological formation in Mongolia
