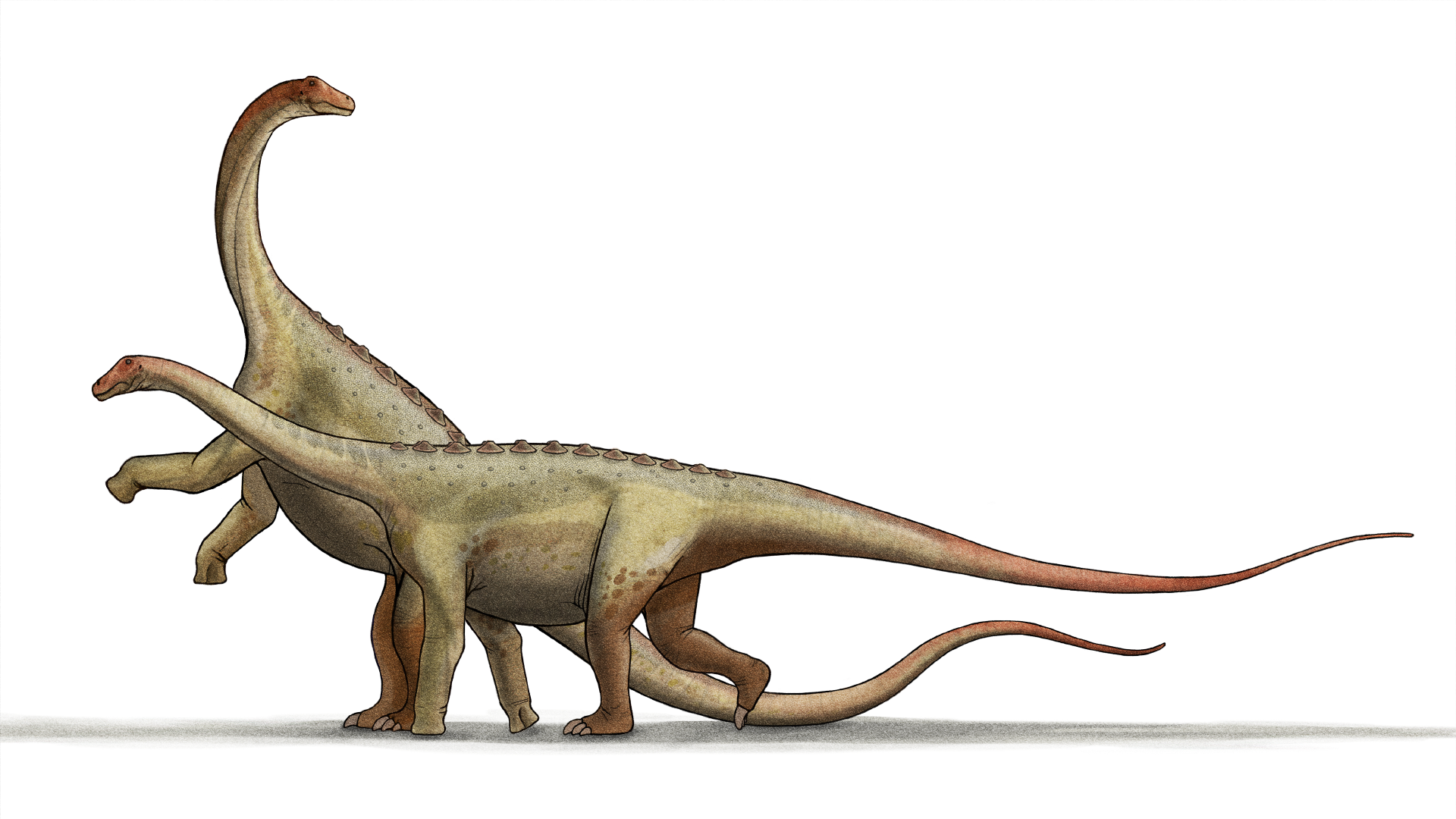
- Life restorations of a pair of Saltasaurus

Scientific classification
- Kingdom: Animalia
- Phylum: Chordata
- Clade: Dinosauria
- Clade: Saurischia
- Clade: †Sauropodomorpha
- Clade: †Sauropoda
- Clade: †Macronaria
- Clade: †Titanosauria
- Clade: †Lithostrotia; Upchurch et al., 2004

Subgroups
- †Adamantisaurus; †Arackar; †Atacamatitan; †Austroposeidon; †Brasilotitan; †Elaltitan; †Epachthosaurus; †Isisaurus; †Malawisaurus; †Mansourasaurus; †Mnyamawamtuka; †Normanniasaurus; †Paralititan; †Petrobrasaurus; †Rapetosaurus; †Rukwatitan; †Sonidosaurus; †Tapuiasaurus; †Uberabatitan; †Uriash; †Volgatitan; †Lirainosaurinae; †Eutitanosauria

= Lithostrotia =

Lithostrotians Temporal range: Early to Late Cretaceous, 120–66 Ma

Extinct clade of dinosaurs

Lithostrotia is a clade of derived titanosaur sauropods that lived during the Early Cretaceous and Late Cretaceous. The group was defined by Upchurch et al. in 2004 as the most recent common ancestor of Malawisaurus and Saltasaurus and all the descendants of that ancestor. Lithostrotia is derived from the Ancient Greek lithostros, meaning "inlaid with stones", referring to the fact that many known lithostrotians are preserved with osteoderms. However, osteoderms are not a distinguishing feature of the group, as the two noted by Unchurch et al. include caudal vertebrae with strongly concave front faces (procoely), although the furthest vertebrae are not procoelous.

== History of research ==
In 1895, Richard Lydekker named the family Titanosauridae to summarize sauropods with procoelous (concave on the front) caudal vertebrae. The name Titanosauridae has since been widely used, and was defined by Salgado and colleagues (1997), Gonzalaz-Riga (2003), and Salgado (2003) as a node-based taxon. According to a proposal by Wilson and Upchurch (2003) looks today much of the research on the use of that name from: Wilson and Upchurch published a revision of the genus Titanosaurus and declare the type species Titanosaurus indicus as invalid because it is based only on two vertebrae of the tail, showing no diagnostically usable features. These authors consistently consider ranking groups that are based on Titanosaurus as the nominal taxon, Titanosauridae, Titanosaurinae and Titanosauroidea - also deemed invalid. In 2004, Upchurch and colleagues presented the new group Lithostrotia to describe the same group as Titanosauridae, but instead it was not based upon a specific taxon. The name Lithostrotia is not currently recognized by all researchers.

== Definition and synapomorphies ==
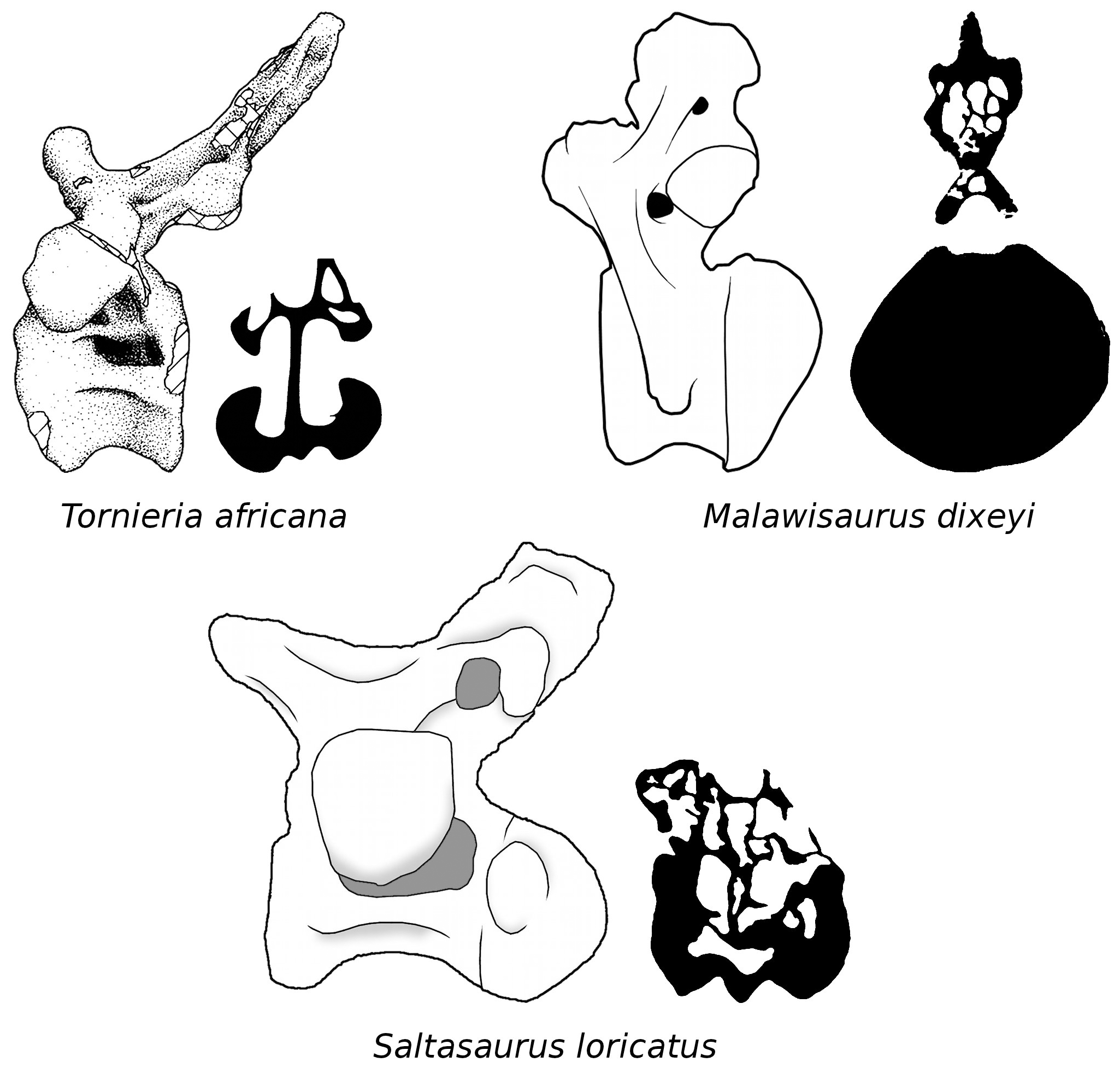
Caudal vertebrae of Malawisaurus (top right) and Saltasaurus (bottom) compared with Tornieria

Upchurch and colleagues (2004) define the Lithostrotia as a node-based taxon which includes the last common ancestor of Malawisaurus and Saltasaurus and all descendants of that ancestor. According to this definition, the Lithostrotia includes all forms that are more derived than Malawisaurus in phylogenies.

In addition to defining the group, Upchurch and colleagues gave two common derived features (synapomorphies), which serve to distinguish the group from non-members. The first is that all caudal vertebrae apart from the furthest distal were procoelous, meaning their front face was concave. The front (proximal) caudal vertebrae were also particularly strong procoelous. This first feature is also shared with Mamenchisauridae.

Unchurch et al. named Lithostrotia based on the presence of osteoderms in many members, but the eponymous osteoderms do not represent synapomorphy, as the evolutionary history of osteoderms is unknown within the titanosaurs. It may be this trait has developed multiple times independently within the titanosaurs and Lithostrotia, as osteoderms are known in many saltasaurids, Mendozasaurus, Aeolosaurus, Ampelosaurus, and various other genera both within and outside Lithostrotia with different morphologies.

== Systematics ==
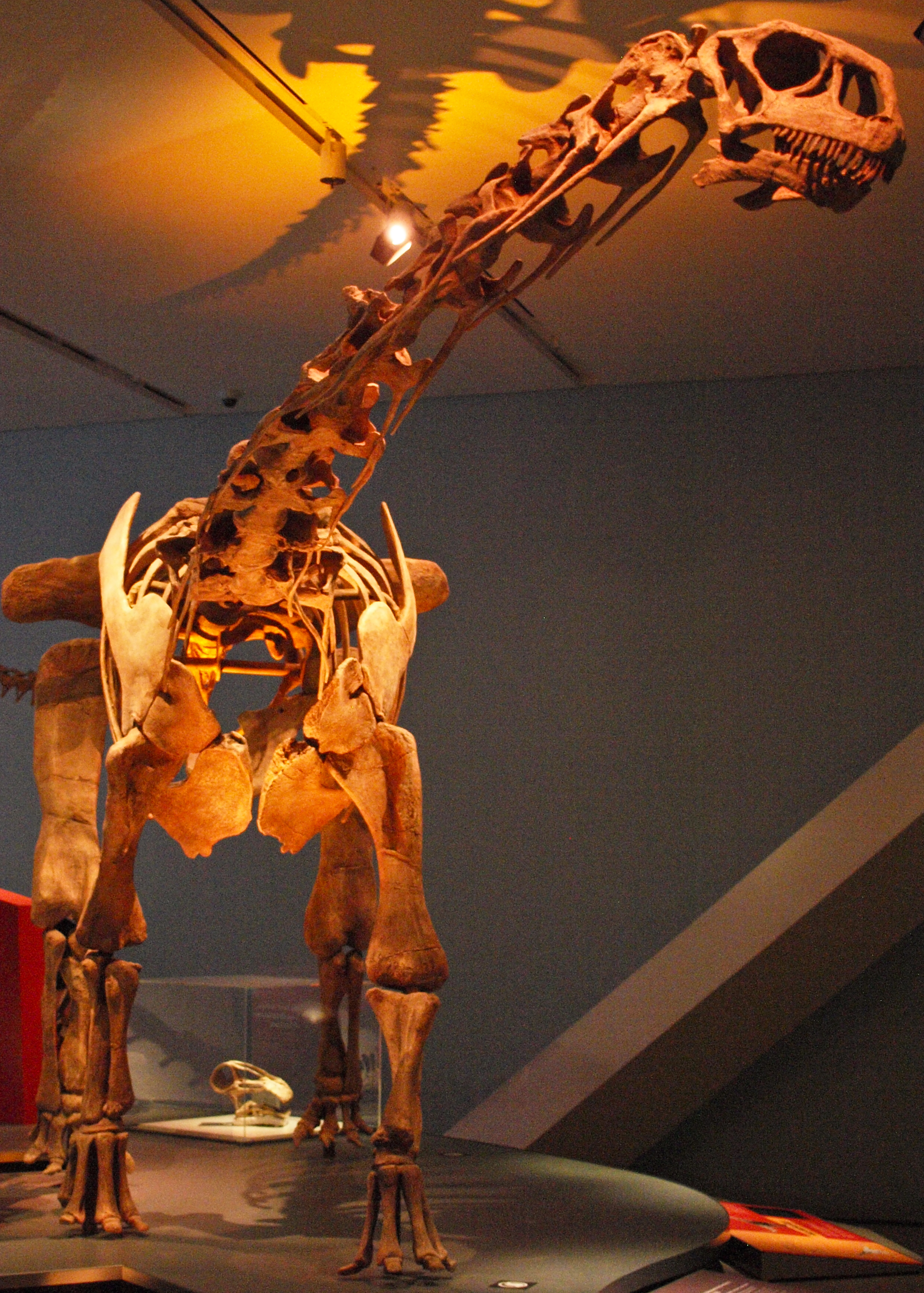
Malawisaurus skeleton, Royal Ontario Museum

Lithostrotia is a derived group of titanosaurs, excluding primitive forms such as Andesaurus and Phuwiangosaurus. The possibly equivalent clade Titanosauridae was positioned in a phylogenetic analysis by Calvo et al. (2007), where it included all titanosaurs apart from Andesaurus, though multiple primitive forms were not analyzed. Other phylogenies, by Unchurch et al. (2015), instead have found a few, non-lithostrotian titanosaurs, or nearly all non-brachiosaurid titanosauriformes within the group. Poropat et al. (2015) conducted a similar analysis to one of Unchurch et al. (2015). This analysis found that Andesaurus, Argentinosaurus and Epachthosaurus were within Titanosauria, but outside Lithostrotia, and the latter group included Malawisaurus, Nemegtosaurus, Diamantinasaurus, Tapuiasaurus and Alamosaurus as basal lithostrotians outside Saltasauridae. Another phylogenetic analysis by Poropat and colleagues in 2016, partially reproduced below, found Diamantinasaurus as a non-lithostrotian titanosaur and the sister taxon of the contemporary Savannasaurus. The cladogram below follows Mocho et al. (2019) with the new subgroup called Lirainosaurinae.

Poropat et al. (2016)

- Titanosauria
  - Andesaurus
  - - - Dongyangosaurus
      - Baotianmansaurus
    - - Ligabuesaurus
      - - - Savannasaurus
          - Diamantinasaurus
        - - - Xianshanosaurus
            - Daxiatitan
          - Lithostrotia
            - Malawisaurus
            - - - Muyelensaurus
                - - Futalognkosaurus
                  - Epachthosaurus
              - - Nemegtosauridae
                  - Tapuiasaurus
                  - Nemegtosaurus
                - - Isisaurus
                  - Saltasauridae
                    - Saltasaurus
                    - - Opisthocoelicaudia
                      - - Jiangshanosaurus
                        - Alamosaurus

Mocho et al. (2019)

- Lithostrotia
  - Malawisaurus
  - - - Paludititan
      - Lohuecotitan
    - - Epachthosaurus
      - - - Opisthocoelicaudiinae
            - Alamosaurus
            - Opisthocoelicaudia
        - - - Saltasaurinae
              - Neuquensaurus
              - - Rocasaurus
                - Saltasaurus
          - - - Lirainosaurinae
                - Lirainosaurus
                - - Atsinganosaurus
                  - Ampelosaurus
            - - Bonatitan
              - - - Rapetosaurus
                  - Nemegtosaurus
                - - Aeolosaurinae
                    - Gondwanatitan
                    - Aeolosaurus
                  - Rinconsauria
                    - Rinconsaurus
                    - - Muyelensaurus
                      - - Bonitasaura
                        - Lognkosauria
                          - Mendozasaurus
                          - Futalognkosaurus

While the clade Lithostrotia has been used in many different phylogenetic analyses as a description for a clade of titanosaurs, its use is not universal. The clade has been omitted from results as it has been considered a synonym of Titanosauria, or it has been used as either a very large clade encompassing almost all titanosaurs, or a smaller clade that excludes the taxa of Colossosauria. These incongruent results are because of the instability of the defining taxon Malawisaurus, which may in fact represent a chimaeric assemblage of remains and requires re-evaluation to determine what Lithostrotia includes.
