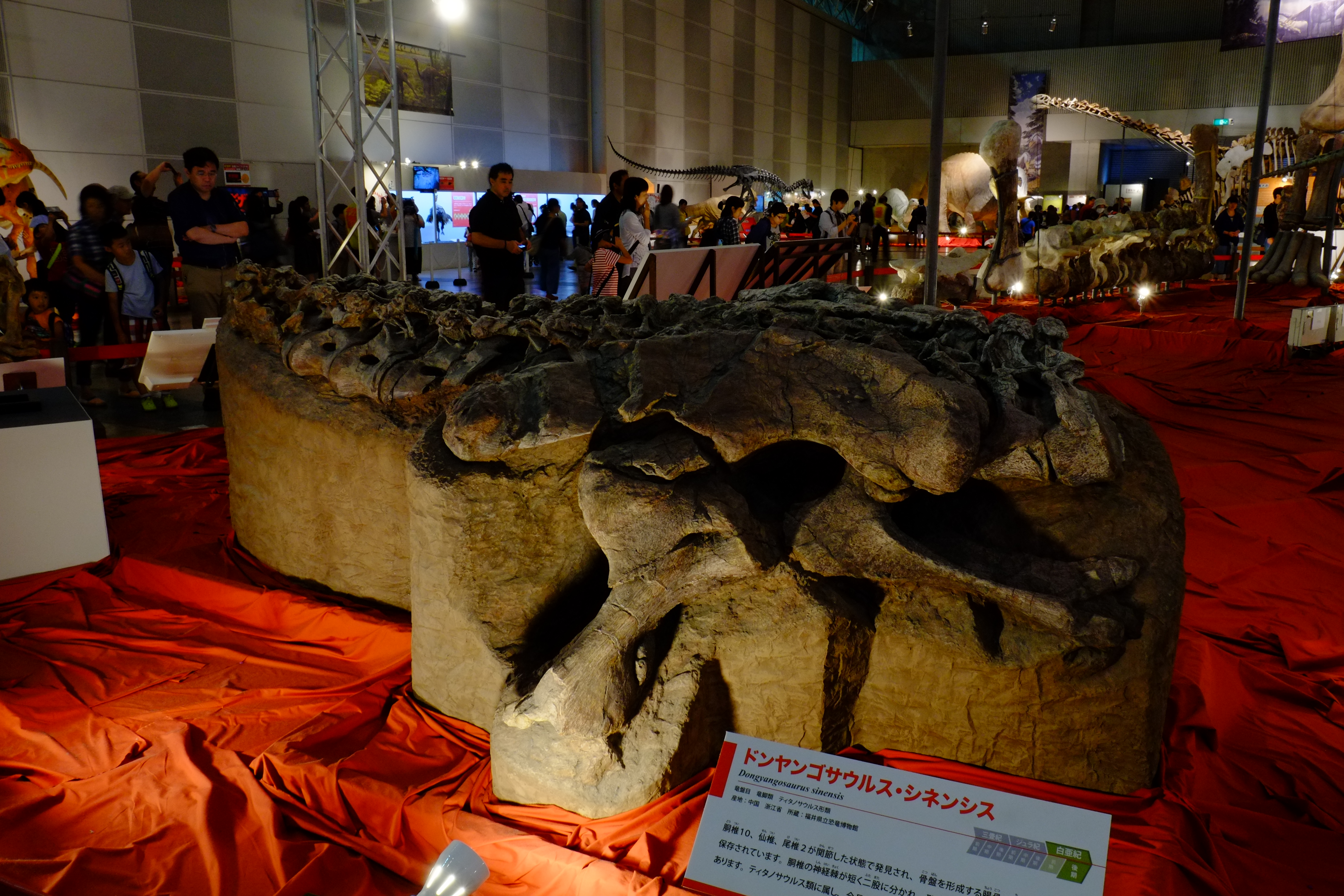
- Holotype

Scientific classification
- Kingdom: Animalia
- Phylum: Chordata
- Class: Reptilia
- Clade: Dinosauria
- Clade: Saurischia
- Clade: †Sauropodomorpha
- Clade: †Sauropoda
- Clade: †Macronaria
- Clade: †Titanosauria
- Genus: †Dongyangosaurus; Lü et al., 2008
- Species: †D. sinensis

Binomial name
- †Dongyangosaurus sinensis Lü et al., 2008

= Dongyangosaurus =

Dongyangosaurus Temporal range: Late Cretaceous, 92–88 Ma

Extinct genus of dinosaurs

Dongyangosaurus is a genus of titanosaurian sauropod dinosaur from the Late Cretaceous. The only species is Dongyangosaurus sinensis, from which only a single fragmentary skeleton is known, coming from the Zhejiang province of eastern China. It was described and named by Lü Junchang and colleagues. Like other sauropods, Dongyangosaurus would have been a large quadrupedal herbivore.

== Description ==
The only skeleton (holotype DYM 04888) is stored in the Dongyang Museum (Dongyang, Zhejiang). It consists of ten dorsal vertebrae, the sacrum, two caudal vertebrae as well as the complete pelvis. The skeleton was found articulated.

Dongyangosaurus was a midsized sauropod, measuring approximately 50 ft (15 m) in length and 15 ft (5 m) in height. The dorsal vertebrae were characterized by eye shaped pleurocoels and low bifurcated neural spines. The sacrum consisted of six fused sacral vertebrae, a feature unique to somphospondylans. The caudal vertebrae were amphicoelous (concave anteriorly and posteriorly). The pubis was shorter than the ischium. The obturator foramen was narrow and extended.

== Systematics ==
When this genus was first described, it was thought to be a titanosauriform of uncertain placement. In 2013, however, it was found to be a saltasaurid closely related to the Mongolian sauropod Opisthocoelicaudia. In 2019, this was again changed to a position outside of the Lithostrotia.

== Discovery ==
The Upper Cretaceous of Zhejiang is known for its fossil dinosaur eggs. Skeletal remains are rarely found; the only described dinosaurs are the sauropod Jiangshanosaurus from the Jinhua Formation, the theropod Chilantaisaurus zhejiangensis (now known to have been an indeterminate therizinosaurid theropod unrelated to Chilantaisaurus), and the nodosaurid Zhejiangosaurus from the Chaochuan Formation. Dongyangosaurus comes from the Jinhua Formation. The age of this unit is considered Turonian-Coniacian.

The specimen was found in 2007 in the village of Baidian within the city of Dongyang, from which the generic name is derived. The specific name, sinensis, is Greek for "from China".
