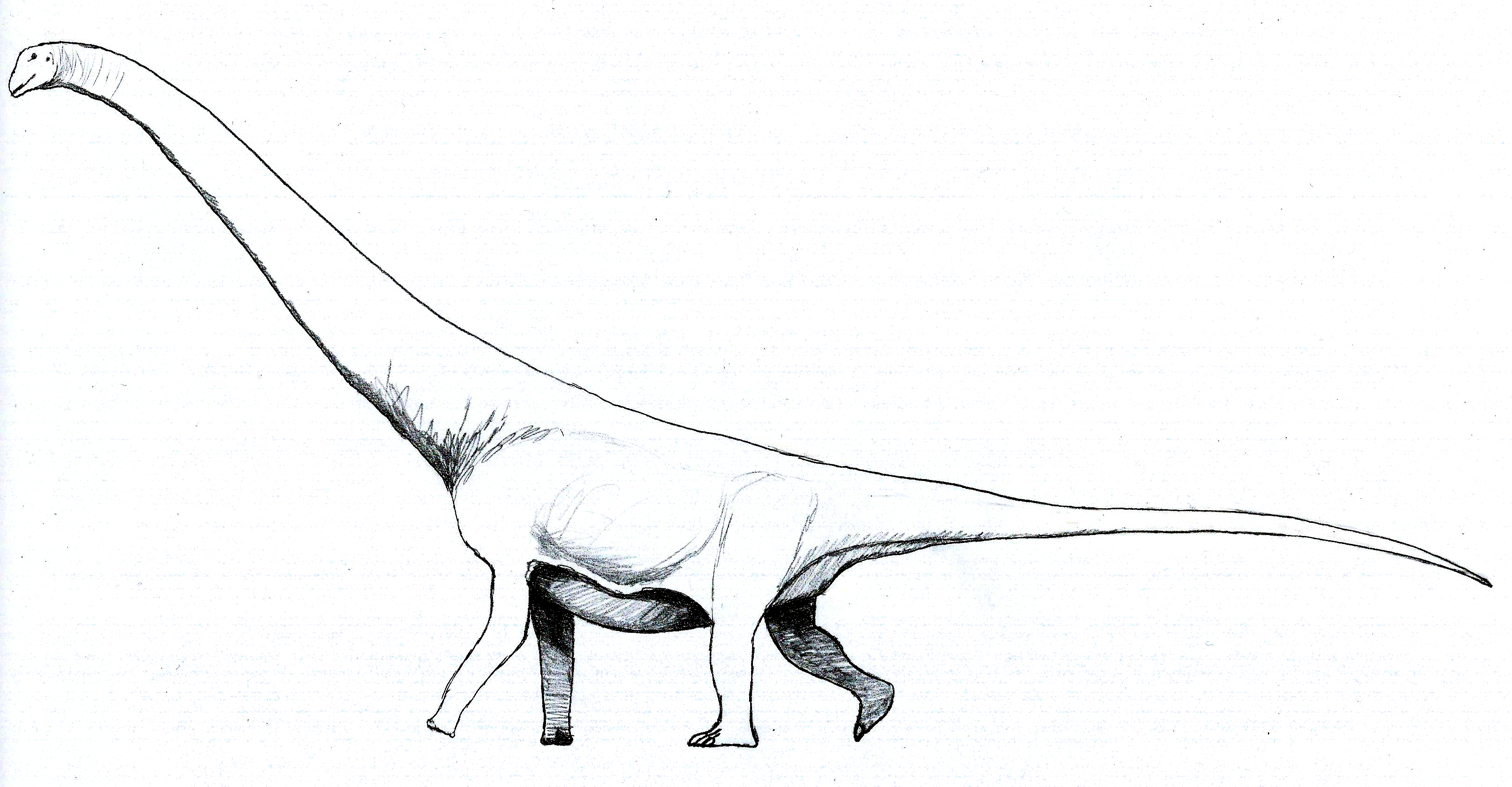
- Illustration of Andesaurus

Scientific classification
- Kingdom: Animalia
- Phylum: Chordata
- Class: Reptilia
- Clade: Dinosauria
- Clade: Saurischia
- Clade: †Sauropodomorpha
- Clade: †Sauropoda
- Clade: †Macronaria
- Clade: †Titanosauria
- Genus: †Andesaurus; Calvo & Bonaparte, 1991
- Species: †A. delgadoi

Binomial name
- †Andesaurus delgadoi Calvo & Bonaparte, 1991

= Andesaurus =

Andesaurus Temporal range: Albian ~111–106 Ma

Extinct genus of dinosaurs

Andesaurus (/ˌændəˈsɔːrəs/ AN-də-SOR-əs; "Andes lizard") is a genus of basal titanosaurian sauropod dinosaur which existed during the Albian stage of the Early Cretaceous in South America. Like most sauropods, it would have had a small head on the end of a long neck and an equally long tail.

== History of discovery ==
Andesaurus compared to some humans.

In 1991, paleontologists Jorge Orlando Calvo and José Fernando Bonaparte named Andesaurus, which refers to the Andes and also includes the Greek word sauros ("lizard"), because of the proximity of this animal's remains to the Andes. Andesaurus fossils were found by Alejandro Delgado, after whom the single known species (A. delgadoi) is named.

The only known material of Andesaurus is a partial skeleton consisting of a series of four vertebrae from the lower back, as well as 27 tail vertebrae, divided up into two series from separate parts of the tail. The vertebrae from the middle part of its tail had elongated centra. Elements of the pelvis were also discovered, including two ischia and a pubis bone, along with rib fragments and an incomplete humerus and femur.

== Description ==
Andesaurus was a medium-sized sauropod. Total length estimates place the known remains at 15 metres (49 ft) to 18 metres (59 ft) long, and around 7 metric tons (7.7 short tons) in body mass.

The dorsal vertebrae of Andesaurus bear the typical features of an opisthocoelous centrum and large lateral pleurocoel (pneumatic depression). Unlike related Phuwiangosaurus, there is no ventral keel under any of the vertebrae, and there is a pneumatic feature on the front of the neural arch, the latter being found in most neosauropods. Potentially diagnostic for Andesaurus, there is an additional ridge supporting the lower articulation for the ribs (parapophysis), although poor preservation in other vertebrae means it can only be identified on one bone. The hyposphene-hypantrum articulations of Andesaurus are smaller than more basal sauropods, but less reduced than in Argentinosaurus or Epachthosaurus, where the surface is only articular ridges, and also less reduced than more derived titanosaurs where the articulation is entirely absent. Pre- and post-spinal laminae are present in the vertebrae of Andesaurus, like in other somphospondylans.

Tail vertebrae (caudals) of Andesaurus are slightly procoelous, where the anterior face is concave and the posterior face of convex. This convexity is less prominent than more derived titanosaurs, but is still diagnostic of the clade as a whole. The first caudal has a flat anterior and slightly convex posterior face, different from the subsequent vertebrae similar to in Epachthosaurus. A prominent depression is present on the bottom surface of some anterior caudals, a feature present in diplodocids and multiple titanosaurs. Anterior caudals are shorter proportionally, the bones becoming almost double the proportional length towards the end of the tail. Lateral pleurocoels are present on some vertebrae, as well as small lateral foramina. These foramina are known in some titanosaurs and non-titanosaurs, but their phylogenetic distribution is poorly understood. Like in all titanosauriformes, the neural arch is on the anterior portion of the centrum, and the neural spines are elongate and rectangular. The variation along the caudal series is similar to Epachthosaurus and Malawisaurus.

== Classification ==
Several plesiomorphic (primitive) features characterize Andesaurus as the most basal known member of Titanosauria. In fact, this clade has been defined to contain Andesaurus, Saltasaurus, their most recent common ancestor, and all of its descendants. The most prominent plesiomorphy is the articulations between its tail vertebrae. In most derived titanosaurs, the tail vertebrae articulate with ball-and-socket joints, with the hollowed-out socket end on the front (procoelous caudal vertebrae), while in Andesaurus, both ends of the vertebrae are flat (amphiplatyan caudals), as seen in many non-titanosaurian sauropods. Andesaurus itself is only characterized by a single feature, the tall neural spines on top of its back vertebrae, and needs further study.

Some other basal titanosaurs from Argentina, including Argentinosaurus and Puertasaurus, were also sauropods of enormous size. The most derived group of titanosaurs, the Saltasauridae, included some of the smallest known sauropods, including Saltasaurus itself. Thus it is possible that the largest sizes were attained among the more basal members of the clade.

== Palaeoecology ==
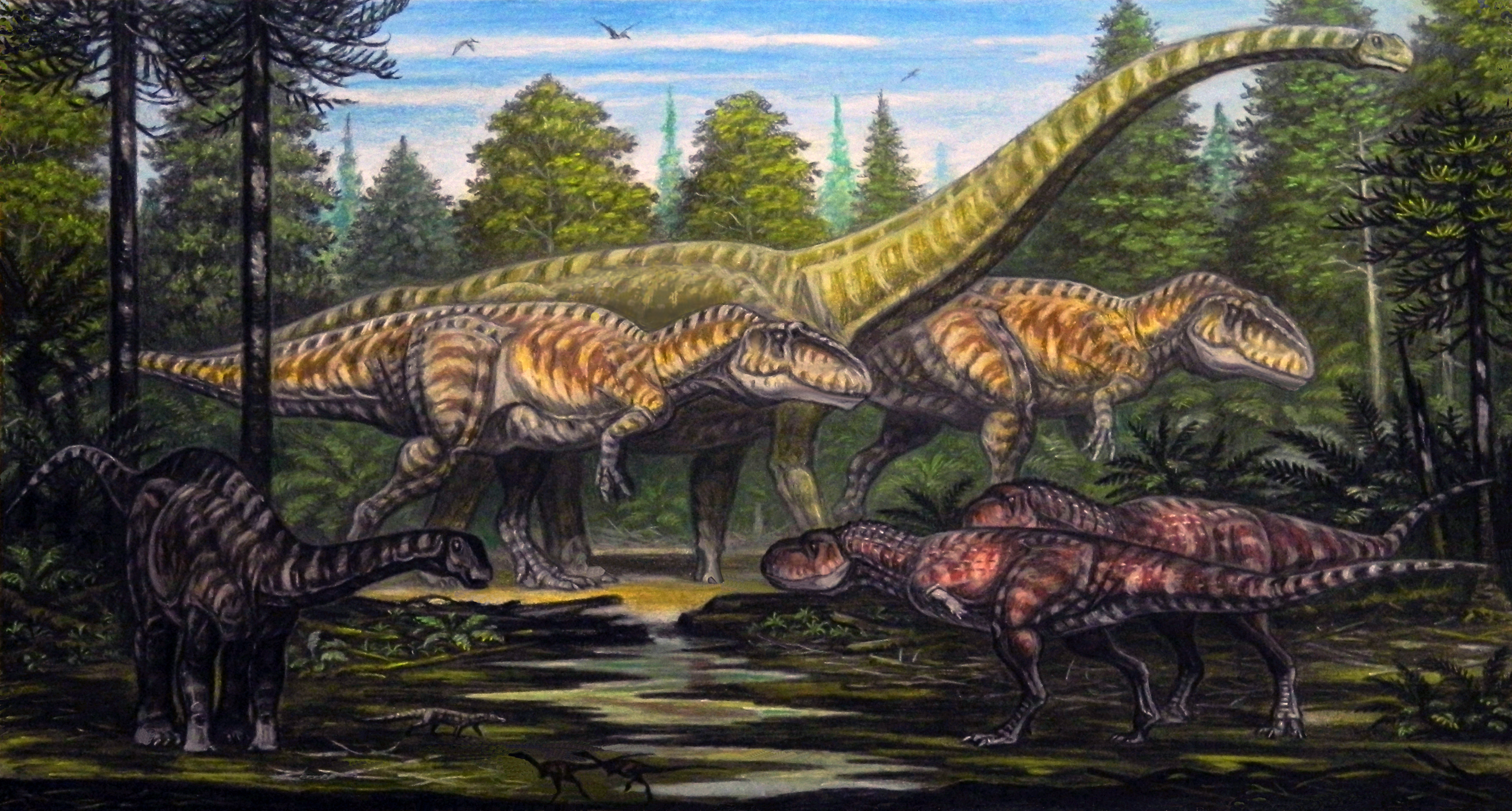
Restoration with the contemporary Giganotosaurus

These fossils were discovered in the Candeleros Formation, the oldest formation within the Neuquén Group of Neuquén Province, Argentina. Originally suggested to be the Cenomanian age of the Late Cretaceous, the maximum depositional age of both the Candeleros Formation and the overlying Huincul Formation is re-dated to the early Albian by Maniel et al. (2026), approximately 111.4 ± 1.1 Ma and 106.2 ± 1.0 Ma respectively. For the most part, the Candeleros represents an ancient braided river system. Besides Andesaurus, the formation also contains fossils of the theropods Buitreraptor and Giganotosaurus, as well as other sauropods including the rebbachisaurid Limaysaurus.
