= List of stratigraphic units with dinosaur body fossils =

This is a list of stratigraphic units from which dinosaur body fossils have been recovered. Although Dinosauria is a clade which includes modern birds, this article covers only Mesozoic stratigraphic units. Units listed are all either formation rank or higher (e.g. group).

== By preservation ==
=== Bone beds and mass graves ===
Name	Age	Location	Part of	Description
Cleveland-Lloyd Dinosaur Quarry	Jurassic	USA	Morrison Formation	Bonebed containing at least 44 Allosaurus as well as remains from Camarasaurus, Stegosaurus, Camptosaurus, Marshosaurus, and many other genera
Ghost Ranch Quarry	Late Triassic	USA	Chinle Formation	Bonebed preserving hundreds of Coelophysis skeletons of all ages as well as remains of many other contemporary animals
Dry Island Buffalo Jump Provincial Park	Early Maastrichtian	Canada	Horseshoe Canyon Formation	Bonebed containing several Albertosaurus specimens of various ages
Egg Mountain	Campanian	USA	Two Medicine Formation	Bonebed preserving several nesting Maiasaura as well as other taxa
Hilda mega-bonebed	Campanian	Canada	Dinosaur Park Formation	Group of several bonebeds containing numerous Centrosaurus
Shishugou Death Pits	Middle or Late Jurassic	China	Shishugou Formation	Believed to have been formed in the footprints of large sauropods and preserve mired specimens of Limusaurus, Guanlong, and other small animals

=== Lagerstätten ===
Name	Age	Location	Description
Crato Formation	Late Aptian	Brazil	Preserves birds like Cratoavis alongside the compsognathid "Ubirajara jubatus"
Jiufotang Formation	Aptian	China	
Las Hoyas	Barremian	Spain	Part of the La Huérguina Formation
Pietraroja Plattenkalk	Albian	Italy	
Romualdo Formation	Early Albian	Brazil	Known primarily for well-preserved pterosaur fossils, but also preserves dinosaurs like Irritator
Solnhofen Limestone	Kimmeridgian	Germany	Origin of all specimens of Archaeopteryx; includes the Torleite Formation and the Painten Formation
Smoky Hill Chalk	Santonian	USA	Birds are known from this unit, but only a few non-avian dinosaurs have been found; part of the Niobrara Formation
Tanis site	Very end of the Maastrichtian	USA	Part of the Hell Creek Formation, is believed to have been deposited at the moment the shockwave from the Chicxulub impactor reached North America
Tiaojishan Formation	Bathonian-Oxfordian	China	
Xiagou Formation	Aptian	China	
Yixian Formation	Barremian	China	

=== Other productive localities ===
Name	Age	Location	Part of	Description
Big Al Quarry	Late Jurassic	USA	Morrison Formation	
Brown Hills	Campanian	Mongolia	Djadochta Formation	Also called "Ukhaa Tolgod"
Flaming Cliffs	Campanian	Mongolia	Djadochta Formation	Also called "Bayn Dzak"

== By diversity ==
Here the units are sorted by the number of genera that have been reported as being represented in their respective fossil yields. Since the creation or synonymy of genera can be subjective, the sorting of the units can only roughly approximate their known paleobiodiversities. Named genera of birds are included in biodiversity estimates.

=== > 20 ===
Name	Age	Location	Notes
Cedar Mountain Formation	Berriasian to basal Cenomanian	USA	Composed of several members (in ascending order of age): Buckhorn Conglomerate, Yellow Cat, Poison Strip Sandstone, Ruby Ranch, and Mussentuchit members
Dinosaur Park Formation	Late Campanian	Canada	subdivided into the lower Sandy Zone and the upper Muddy Zone as well as the uppermost Lethbridge Coal Zone
Hell Creek Formation	Late Maastrichtian	USA	See paleobiota list here
Horseshoe Canyon Formation	Late Campanian to Early Maastrichtian	Canada	Divided into several members (in ascending order of age): the Drumheller, Horsethief, Morrin, Tolman, Carbon, and Whitemud members
Lourinhã Formation	Late Kimmeridgian-earliest Berriasian	Portugal	
Morrison Formation	Kimmeridgian to early Tithonian	USA	See paleobiota list here and list of dinosaurs here
Oldman Formation	Late Campanian	Canada	Composed of a lower and upper member which are non-conforming
Shaximiao Formation	Bathonian to basal Oxfordian	China	Subdivided into the lower (Shangshaximiao) and upper (Xiashaximiao) sections; these roughly correspond to the Shunosaurus-Omeisaurus assemblage and Mamenchisaurus assemblage respectively
Two Medicine Formation	Campanian	Canada; USA	Divided into several members (in ascending order of age): the Rock City, Shields Crossing, Hagans Crossing, "lacustrine interval", and Flag Butte members

=== 10 - 19 ===
Name	Age	Location	Notes
Aguja Formation	Campanian	Mexico; USA	Divided into lower and upper shale members
Allen Formation	Campanian	Argentina	
Argiles et Grès à Reptiles Formation	Early Maastrichtian	France	
Bajo de la Carpa Formation	Late Santonian	Argentina	
Baruungoyot Formation	Middle Campanian (?)	Mongolia	Has been argued to be either contemporaneous with the Nemegt Formation or immediately preceding it
Bayan Mandahu Formation	Campanian	China	
Bayanshiree Formation	Cenomanian to Santonian	Mongolia	
Bissekty Formation	Late Turonian to Coniacian	Uzbekistan	
Cañadón Asfalto Formation	Toarcian	Argentina	paleobiota list here
Candeleros Formation	Albian	Argentina	
Cerro del Pueblo Formation	Campanian	Mexico	
Djadochta Formation	Middle Campanian	China; Mongolia	sometimes spelled "Djadokhta", "Djadokata", or "Dzhadokhtskaya Formation"
Elliot Formation	Norian to Sinemurian	Lesotho; South Africa	Lower Elliot is Late Triassic in age, Upper Elliot is Early Jurassic in age
Foremost Formation	Campanian	Canada	
Huincul Formation	Albian	Argentina	
Iren Dabasu Formation	Uncertain (some time in the Late Cretaceous)	China	
Jiufotang Formation	Aptian	China	
Judith River Formation	Late Campanian	USA	Composed of the lower McClelland Ferry and upper Coal Ridge members
Kaiparowits Formation	Campanian	USA	Divided into three members (lower, middle, and upper)
Kimmeridge Clay	Kimmeridgian to Late Tithonian	UK	
Kirtland Formation	Late Campanian	USA	Divided into three members (in ascending order of age): the Hunter Wash, Farmington, and De-na-zin members
Lameta Formation	Late Maastrichtian	India	
Lance Formation	Late Maastrichtian	USA	
Lufeng Formation	Hettangian to Pliensbachian	China	
Nanxiong Formation	Maastrichtian	China	
Nemegt Formation	Early Maastrichtian	Mongolia	
Oxford Clay	Callovian	UK	
Portezuelo Formation	Late Turonian to early Coniacian	Argentina	
Prince Creek Formation	Late Campanian to Maastrichtian	USA	
Rio Colorado Formation	Campanian	Argentina	
Scollard Formation	Late Maastrichtian	Canada	Only the lower Scollard Formation was deposited during the Mesozoic
Shaximiao Formation	Bathonian to basal Oxfordian	China	Subdivided into the lower (Shangshaximiao) and upper (Xiashaximiao) sections; these roughly correspond to the Shunosaurus-Omeisaurus assemblage and Mamenchisaurus assemblage respectively
Tendaguru Formation	Kimmeridgian	Tanzania	
Tremp Formation	Maastrichtian-Thanetian	Spain	
Trossingen Formation	Norian-Rhaetian	Germany	
Wahweap Formation	Middle Campanian	USA	
Wangshi Group	Campanian to early Maastrichtian	China	Consists of the Linjiazhuang, Jiangjunding, Xingezhuang, Hongtuya, Jingangkou, and Shijiatun formations
Wessex Formation	Barremian	UK	
Xiagou Formation	Aptian	China	
Xinminbao Group	Barremian to Albian	China; Mongolia	Composed of the Chijinbao, Digou, and Zhonggou formations
Yixian Formation	Barremian	China	See list of paleobiota here

=== 5-10 ===
Name	Age	Location	Description
Adamantina Formation	Late Cretaceous	Brazil	
Alcobaça Formation	Kimmeridgian	Portugal	Also known as "Camadas de Guimarota"
Almond Formation	Late Cretaceous	USA	
Antlers Formation	Late Aptian to Middle Albian	USA	
Arcillas de Morella Formation	Early Cretaceous	Spain	
Arundel Clay	Middle Aptian to Early Albian.	USA	
Bahariya Formation	Early Cretaceous	Egypt	
Bajo Barreal Formation	Cenomanian to Coniacian	Argentina	
Chipping Norton Formation	Middle Jurassic	UK	
Clarens Formation	Sinemurian	Lesotho; South Africa	
Cloverly Formation	Late Aptian	USA	
Csehbanya Formation	Late Cretaceous	Hungary	
Denver Formation	Maastrichtian	USA	
Elrhaz Formation	Late Aptian	Niger	
Eumeralla Formation	Early Cretaceous	Australia	
Fengjiahe Formation	Early Jurassic	China	
Ferris Formation	Late Maastrichtian	USA	
Forest Marble Formation	Middle Jurassic	UK	
Frenchman Formation	Late Maastrichtian	Canada	
Great Oolite Group	Middle Jurassic	UK	
Gosau Group	Late Cretaceous to Early Eocene	Germany	
Griman Creek Formation	Early to Late Cretaceous	Australia	
Haoling Formation	Early Cretaceous	China	
Huajiying Formation	Late Jurassic to Early Cretaceous	China	
Ilek Formation	Early Cretaceous	Russia	
Ischigualasto Formation	Carnian	Argentina	
Javelina Formation	Late Cretaceous	USA	
Kayenta Formation	Sinemurian to Pliensbachian	USA	
Khok Kruat Formation	Early Cretaceous	Thailand	
Kitadani Formation	Aptian to Albian	Japan	
La Huérguina Formation	Early Cretaceous	Spain	
Laramie Formation	Late Maastrichtian	USA	
Lecho Formation	Late Cretaceous	Argentina	
Lianmuqin Formation	Early Cretaceous	China	
Los Colorados Formation	Norian	Argentina	
Maevarano Formation	Campanian	Madagascar	
Milk River Formation	Early Campanian	Canada	
Minhe Formation	Late Cretaceous	China	
Moreno Hill Formation	Late Cretaceous	USA	
Rio Neuquen Formation	Late Cretaceous	Argentina	
Sânpetru Formation	Late Maastrichtian	Romania	
Sao Khua Formation	Hauterivian to Valanginian	Thailand	
Sebes Formation	Late Cretaceous	Romania	
Snow Hill Island Formation	Late Cretaceous	Argentine Antarctica; British Antarctic Territory; Chilean Antarctic Territory	
St. Mary River Formation	Late Cretaceous	Canada	
Tunbridge Wells Sand Formation	Early Cretaceous	England	
Twin Mountains Formation	Early Cretaceous	USA	
Udurchukan Formation	Maastrichtian	Russia	
Villar del Arzobispo Formation	Late Jurassic to Early Cretaceous	Spain	
Wapiti Formation	Early Campanian to Late Maastrichtian	Canada	
Weald Clay	Barremian	UK	
Xingezhuang Formation	Late Cretaceous	China	
Xinlong Formation	Early Cretaceous	China	
Yuliangze Formation	Late Cretaceous	China	
Ziliujing Formation	Early Jurassic	China	

=== < 5 ===
Name	Age	Location	Description
Ain el Guettar Formation		Tunisia	
Aïssa Formation		Algeria	
Alagteeg Formation	Late Cretaceous	Mongolia	
Alcantara Formation		Brazil	
Allaru Formation	Albian	Australia	
Ambolafotsy Formation		Madagascar	
Ampthill Clay		UK	
Angostura Colorada Formation		Argentina	
Ankazomihaboka Formation		Madagascar	
Arén Formation		Spain	
Argiles à Plicatules		France	
Argiles d'Octeville		France	
Asencio Formation		Uruguay	
Azilal Formation		Morocco	
Aurisina Formation	Campanian	Italy	
Bajada Colorada Formation		Argentina	
Balabansai Formation		Kazakhstan; Kyrgyzstan; Uzbekistan	
Bayin-Gobi Formation		China	
Black Creek Formation		US	
Black Peaks Formation		US	
Bluewater Creek Formation		US	
Bostobe Formation		Kazakhstan	
Bungil Formation		Australia	
Bauxite of Cornet		Romania	
Bushveld Sandstone		South Africa	
Calcaire à Spatangues		France	
Calcaire de Caen		France	
Camarillas Formation		Spain	
Castrillo de la Reina Formation		Spain	
Castellar Formation		Spain	
Caturrita Formation	Norian	Brazil	
Cerro Barcino Formation	Aptian-Cenomanian	Argentina	
Cerro Carnerero Formation		Argentina	
Cerro Fortaleza Formation		Argentina	
Charmouth Mudstone Formation	Early Jurassic	UK	
Chenini Member		Tunisia	
Chorrillo Formation		Argentina	
Chuanjie Formation		China	
Ciechocinek Formation		Germany	
Colalura Sandstone		Australia	
Continental intercalaire		Algeria; Egypt; Niger; Sudan; Tunisia	
Cooper Canyon Formation		US	
Crato Formation		Brazil	
Dabrazinskaya Svita		Kazakhstan; Tajikistan	
Dakota Formation		USA	
Dalangshan Formation		China	
Dashuigou Formation	Albian	China	
Demopolis Chalk Formation	Middle Campanian	USA	
Densus Ciula Formation		Romania	
Dorotea Formation	Late Cretaceous	Chile	
Dukamaje Formation		Niger; Nigeria	
Ejinhoro Formation		China	
El Castellar Formation		Spain	
El Gallo Formation		Mexico	
El Mers Formation		Morocco	
Escucha Formation		Spain	
Eutaw Formation		USA	
Evanston Formation		US	
Exter Formation		Germany	
Feuerletten Formation	Rhaetian to ?Sinemurian	Germany	
Fleming Fjord Formation		Greenland	
Forest Sandstone	Hettangian to Sinemurian	Zimbabwe	
Fort Crittenden Formation		USA	
Frontier Formation		USA	
Fruitland Formation		USA	
Galula Formation		Tanzania	
Gaogou Formation		China	
Glauconie argileuse		Belgium	
Glen Rose Formation	Late Aptian to Early Albian	USA	
Goio-Erê Formation	uncertain, Cretaceous	Brazil	
Gosau Group		Austria; Germany; Slovakia	
Grès et sables piquetés		France	
Gres de Labarre Formation		France	
Gres superieurs Formation		Laos	
Grünbach Formation	Campanian	Austria	
Guettioua Sandstone		Morocco	
Guichón Formation		Uruguay	
Guyedong Beds		South Korea	
Hall Lake Formation		USA	
Hanson Formation	Late Sinemurian to Early Pliensbachian	Ross Dependency	
Hantong Formation		China	
Hasandong Formation		South Korea	
Hekou Group		China	
Hornerstown Formation		USA	
Houcheng Formation		China	
Huiquanpu Formation		China	
Ialovachsk Formation	Santonian	Kyrgyzstan; Tajikistan; Uzbekistan	
Inferior Oolite		France	
Isalo III Formation		Madagascar	
Itapecuru Formation		Brazil	
Itat Formation		Russia	
Itombe Formation		Angola	
Jaisalmer Formation		India	
Javkhlant Formation		Mongolia	
Jinhua Formation		China	
Kalahari Deposits		South Africa	
Kalaza Formation		China	
Klettgau Formation		Switzerland	
Khuren Dukh Formation		Mongolia	
Kirkwood Formation		South Africa	
Kota Formation	Hettangian to Pliensbachian	India	
Koum Formation		Cameroon	
La Amarga Formation	Barremian	Argentina	
La Bocana Roja Formation		Mexico	
La Colonia Formation	Maastrichtian	Argentina	
Laguna Colorada Formation	?Norian	Argentina	
Lakota Formation		USA	
Lisandro Formation		Argentina	
Lisangou Formation		China	
Lohan Cura Formation	Barremian	Argentina	
López de Bertodano Formation	Maastrichtian-Danian	Argentine Antarctica; British Antarctic Territory; Chilean Antarctic Territory	
Los Alamitos Formation		Argentina	
Los Blanquitos Formation		Argentina	
Los Molles Formation		Argentina	
Lulworth Formation		England	
Lunde Formation		Norway	
Lura Formation		China	
Maastricht Formation		Belgium; Netherlands	
Mackunda Formation		Australia	
Magnesian Conglomerate		UK	
Maleri Formation	Norian	India	
Marree Subgroup		Australia	
Marilia Formation		Brazil	
Marnes a Belemnopsis latesulcatus Formation		France	
Marnes de Chalins		France	
Marnes de Dives		France	
Marnes Irisees Superieures Formation	Late Norian	France	
Marnes a Belemnopsis latesulcatus Formation		France	
Marnes Rouges Inferieures		France	
Mata Amarilla Formation		Argentina	
Marshalltown Formation		US	
McRae Formation		US	
Meng-Yin Formation		China	
Miaogou Formation	~Aptian–Albian	China	
Moon-Airel Formation		France	
Mooreville Chalk Formation	Early Maastrichtian	USA	
Moreno Formation		USA	
Moreno Hill Formation		USA	
Murtoi Formation		Russia	
Nam Phong Formation	Late Norian to Rhaetian	Thailand	
Navajo Sandstone	Pliensbachian to Toarcian	USA	
Navesink Formation		USA	
Neocomian Sands		Kazakhstan	
Niobrara Chalk		USA	
On Gong Formation		China	
Ornatenton Formation		Germany	
Ouled Abdoun Basin		Morocco	
Oum ed Diab Member		Tunisia	
Pab Formation		Pakistan	
Packard Formation		Mexico	
Painten Formation		Germany	
Paluxy Formation		USA	
Paw Paw Formation	Late Albian	USA	
Penglaizhen Formation		China	
Peruc-Korycany Formation		Czech Republic	
Pierre Shale		Canada; USA	
Piedrahita de Muno Formation		Spain	
Pietraroia Plattenkalk		Italy	
Plottier Formation		Argentina	
Point Loma Formation		USA	
Portland Formation	Pliensbachian to Toarcian	USA	
Posidonia Shale	Toarcian	Germany	
Potton Sands		UK	
Poudingue Ferrugineux		France	
Presidente Prudente Formation		Brazil	
Qiketai Formation		China	
Qingshan Formation		China	
Quebrada del Barro Formation	Norian	Argentina	
Quirico Formation		Brazil	
Quseir Formation		Egypt	
Rayoso Formation		Argentina	
Reuchenette Formation		Switzerland	
Ripley Formation		USA	
Romualdo Formation		Brazil	
Ryugase Group		Russia	
Saltrio Formation	Sinemurian	Italy	
Santa Marta Formation		Argentine Antarctica; British Antarctic Territory; Chilean Antarctic Territory	
Sainte-Barbe Clays Formation		Belgium	
Sekmenevsk Formation		Russia	
Sembar Formation		Pakistan	
Sengoku Formation		Japan	
Seonso Conglomerate		South Korea	
Shanyang Formation		China	
Sharp's Hill Formation		UK	
Shestakovskaya Svita		Mongolia; Russia	
Shinekhudag Svita		Mongolia	
Solnhofen limestone	Kimmeridgian	Germany	
Subashi Formation		China	
Suining Formation		China	
Sunjiawan Formation		China	
Tando Beds		South Korea	
Tangshang Formation		China	
Taynton Limestone Formation		UK	
Tiouraren Formation		Niger	
Toqui Formation		Chile	
Toolebuc Formation		Australia	
Torleite Formation		Germany	
Toutunhe Formation		China	
Tuchengzi Formation	Tithonian	China	
Turney Ranch Formation		USA	
Ulansuhai Formation	Turonian	China	
Vectis Formation		UK	
Vitakri Formation		Pakistan	
Westbury Formation	Rhaetian	UK	
Willow Creek Formation		Canada	
Willow Tank Formation		USA	
Winton Formation	Cenomanian	Australia	
Woodbine Formation		USA	
Woodbury Formation		USA	
Wonthaggi Formation	Valanginian to Aptian	Australia	
Xert Formation		Spain	
Xiaoyan Formation		China	
Xinpongnaobao Formation		China	
Xintiangou Formation		China	
Zhenzhuchong Formation		China	
Zhoutian Formation	Turonian–early Coniacian	China	

=== Indeterminate ===
This list includes stratigraphic units that have produced dinosaur remains, although none of these remains have been referred to a specific genus.

Name	Location	Description
Adaffa Formation	Saudi Arabia	
Al-Khod Conglomerate	Oman	
Amagodani Formation	Japan	
Amole Formation	US	
Anoual Formation	Morocco	
Ankarafantsika Formation	Madagascar	
Arapahoe Formation	US	
Argiles de Châtillon	France	
Argiles du Gault	France	
Argiles Ostreennes	France	
Artoles Formation	Spain	
Ashizawa Formation	Japan	
Baiying Bologai Formation	Mongolia	
Batylykh Formation	Russia	
Bearreraig Sandstone Formation	Scotland	
Billman Creek Formation	US	
Birdsong Sandstone	Australia	
Blesa Formation	Spain	
Blufftown Formation	US	
Bonnet Plume Formation	Canada	
Broadford Beds Formation	Scotland	
Buckeburg Formation	Germany	
Budden Canyon Formation	US	
Burmese amber	Myanmar	
Calcare di Zorzino	Italy	
Calcarintes du Jadet Formation	France	
Calizas de Lychnus Formation	Spain	
Camas Formation	Mexico	
Cape Sebastian Sandstone	US	
Castlegate Sandstone	US	
Chalk Group	England	
Chandler Formation	US	
Chari Formation	India	
Chico Formation	US	
Chilgog Formation	South Korea	
Chota Formation	Peru	
Cimarron Ridge Formation	US	
Cokedale Formation	US	
Coreena Formation	Australia	
Cornbrash Formation	UK	
Craie Chloritee	France	
Crevasse Canyon Formation	US	
Dahkla Formation	Egypt	
Dohoin Usu Formation	Mongolia	
Donoho Creek Formation	US	
Douiret Formation	Tunisia	
Eagle Sandstone	US	
Enon Formation	South Africa	
Esquias Formation	Honduras	
Etjo Formation	Namibia	
Farak Formation	Niger	
Fox Hills Formation	US	
Garita Creek Formation	US	
Gangapur Formation	India	
Gerhartsreiter Schichten	Germany	
Gokwe Formation	Zimbabwe	
Gres a Avicula contorta	France	
Hasle Formation	Denmark	
Heiberg Formation	Canada	
Hidden Lake Formation	Argentine Antarctica; British Antarctic Territory; Chilean Antarctic Territory	
Hoganas Formation	Sweden	
Horsethief Sandstone	US	
Huriwai Measures Formation	New Zealand	
Iles Formation	US	
Iljig Formation	South Korea	
In Beceten Formation	Niger	
Isalo II Formation	Madagascar	
Izuki Formation	Japan	
Jagua Formation	Cuba	
Jinju Formation	South Korea	
Kakanaut Formation	Russia	
Kaladongar Formation	India	
Kallakurichi Formation	India	
Kanguk Formation	Canada	
Kcskehát Limestone	Hungary	
Kellaways Formation	England	
Khilok Formation	Russia	
Khooldzin Svita	Mongolia	
Kilmaluag Formation	Scotland	
Koum Formation	Cameroon	
Kristianstad Basin	Sweden	
Ksar Metlili Formation	Morocco	
Kootenai Formation	US	
Kwango Group	* DRC	
La Boca Formation	Mexico	
Ladd Formation	US	
Lapurr Sandstone	Kenya	
Lastres Formation	Spain	
Les Sables de Glos Formation	France	
Lestaillats Marls Formation	France	
Livingston Group	USA	
Lushangfen Formation	China	
Luxembourg Sandstone	Luxembourg	
Mabdi Formation	Yemen	
Mahadek Formation	India	
Marnes de Bleville	France	
Marnes de Chalin Formation	France	
Marnes de Villers	France	
Marnes rouges de Roquelongue Formation	France	
Masuk Formation	US	
Matsuo Group	Japan	
Mecsek Coal Formation	Hungary	
Meeteetse Formation	US	
Mesa Rica Formation	US	
Mifune Group	Japan	
Miria Formation	Australia	
Mitsuse Formation	Japan	
Mizdah Formation	Libya	
Moenave Formation	US	
Molecap Greensand	Australia	
Montejunto Formation	Portugal	
Monti Prenestini Carbonatic Platform	Italy	
Moskvoretskaya Formation	Russia	
Mugher Mudstone	Ethiopia	
Nagdong Formation	South Korea	
Naturita Formation	US	
Newark Canyon Formation	US	
Northampton Sands Formation	UK	
Okurodani Formation	Japan	
Ojinaga Formation	Mexico	
Oncala Group	Spain	
Owl Creek Formation	US	
Palau Formation	Mexico	
Papo Seco Formation	Portugal	
Patcham Formation	India	
Pictured Cliffs Formation	US	
Point Lookout Sandstone	US	
Priesener Formation	Czech Republic	
Qagannur Formation	China	
Qigu Formation	China	
Rabekke Formation	Denmark	
Ravar Formation	Iran	
Raritan Formation	US	
Ringbone Formation	US	
Sables de Breze	France	
Sables de Cherre	France	
Sables du Lussant	France	
Sables et Gres a Trigonia gibbosa	France	
Sables vert de l'Albien Formation	France	
Sand Wells Formation	US	
Sangarskaya Svita	Russia	
Sannine Formation	Lebanon	
Sebayashi Formation	Japan	
Severn Formation	US	
Shendi Formation	Sudan	
Shuttle Meadow Formation	US	
Sinuiju Formation	North Korea	
Snake Ridge Formation	Mexico	
Soledad Beds	Mexico	
Speeton Clay	United Kingdom	
Summerville Formation	USA	
Summit Creek Formation	Canada	
Sundays River Formation	South Africa	
Tahora Formation	New Zealand	
Takatika Grit	Chatham Islands	
Tazukawa Formation	Japan	
Telegraph Creek Formation	US	
Tilougguit Formation	Morocco	
Tiki Formation	India	
Tres Hermanos Formation	US	
Trichinopoly Group	India	
Tujingzi Formation	China	
Ulan Malgait Formation	Mongolia	
Unit S3U1	Spain	
Valle de Angeles Redbeds	Honduras	
Valtos Sandstone Formation	Scotland	
Vega Formation	Spain	
Villigen Formation	Switzerland	
Wadi Milk Formation	Sudan	
Whitby Mudstone Formation	UK	
Wangmen Formation	China	
Williams Formation	US	
Yacoraite Formation	Argentina	
Yongantun Formation	China	
Zhirkindek Formation	Kazakhstan	
Zoumagang Formation	China	

== See also ==
- Lists of dinosaur-bearing stratigraphic units
- List of fossil sites
