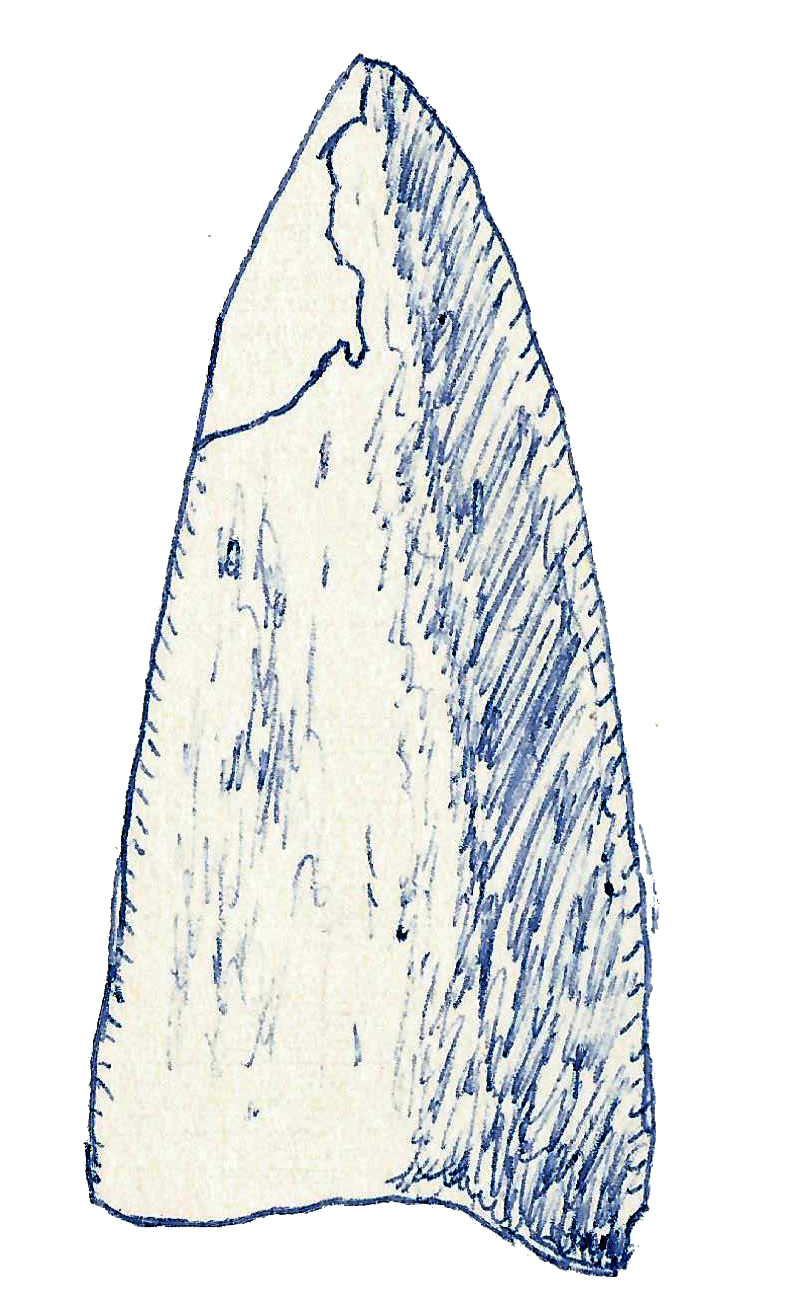
- Drawing of a tooth from M. haplodon

Scientific classification
- Domain: Eukaryota
- Kingdom: Animalia
- Phylum: Chordata
- Clade: Dinosauria
- Clade: Saurischia
- Clade: †Sauropodomorpha
- Clade: †Sauropoda
- Clade: †Macronaria
- Clade: †Somphospondyli
- Genus: †Mongolosaurus; Gilmore, 1933

Type species
- †Mongolosaurus haplodon Gilmore, 1933

= Mongolosaurus =

Mongolosaurus Temporal range: Early Cretaceous, 115–108 Ma

Extinct genus of dinosaurs

Mongolosaurus is a genus of titanosauriform sauropod dinosaur which lived during the Early Cretaceous of China.

== Discovery and systematics ==
In 1928 a team from the American Museum of Natural History, headed by Roy Chapman Andrews, at On Gong Gol near Hukongwulong in Inner Mongolia, in Quarry 714 discovered a sauropod tooth. In 1933 Charles W. Gilmore, based on this fossil, named and described the type species Mongolosaurus haplodon. The generic name refers to Mongolia. The specific name is derived from Greek haploos, "single", and odon, "tooth".

The holotype, AMNH 6710, was found in the Early Cretaceous (Aptian-Albian) On Gong Formation. It consists of teeth, a basioccipital from the back of the skull and parts of the first three cervical vertebrae.

== Classification ==
Mongolosaurus was previously assigned to Diplodocidae, Titanosauridae and Euhelopodidae, though recent studies find it to be either a basal titanosaur or a non-titanosaurian somphospondylan.

In their 2023 description of the titanosaur Jiangxititan. Mo et al. analyzed the phylogenetic relationships of Mongolosaurus. They recovered Mongolosaurus as a derived member of the titanosaurian clade Lognkosauria, as the sister taxon to Jiangxititan. The results of their phylogenetic analyses are shown in the cladogram below:

- Titanosauria
  - Diamantinasauria
  - - - Xianshanosaurus
      - Daxiatitan
      - Australodocus
    - Lithostrotia
      - Malawisaurus
      - - - - Aeolosaurus
            - Rapetosaurus
          - - Isisaurus
            - Saltasaurus
            - - Opisthocoelicaudia
              - Alamosaurus
        - - Epachthosaurus
          - - - Pitekunsaurus
              - - Tapuiasaurus
                - - Antarctosaurus
                  - - Vahiny
                    - Jainosaurus
            - - Normanniasaurus
              - Rinconsaurus
              - Muyelensaurus
              - Nemegtosaurus
              - Lognkosauria
                - Mendozasaurus
                - Argentinosaurus
                - Futalognkosaurus
                - - Patagotitan
                  - Notocolossus
                  - - Puertasaurus
                    - - Jiangxititan
                      - Mongolosaurus
