= List of fossiliferous stratigraphic units in Czech Republic =

Group or Formation	Period	Notes
Acanthopyge Limestone	Devonian	
Bačov Formation	Permian	
Baden Group/Leitha Formation	Neogene	
Bechlejovice II Formation	Neogene	
Bílá hora Formation	Cretaceous	
Bílá Formation	Cretaceous	
Boghead Coal Formation	Carboniferous	
Bohdalec Formation	Ordovician	
Braník Limestone Group/Chynice Limestone Formation	Devonian	
Braník Limestone Group/Prokop Formation	Devonian	
Braník Limestone Group/Reporyje Limestone Formation	Devonian	
Braník Limestone Group/Rožmitál Limestone Formation	Devonian	
Braník Limestone Group/Slivenec Limestone Formation	Devonian	
Braník Limestone Group/Slivenec Limestone and Řeporyje Limestone Formation	Devonian	
Braník Limestone Group/Zlíchov beds Formation	Devonian	
Braník Limestone Group/Zlíchov limestone Formation	Devonian	
Březina Formation	Carboniferous	
Březno Formation	Cretaceous	
Braník Limestones Group/Slivenec Limestone Formation	Devonian	
Braník Limestones Group/Upper Koněprusy Limestone Formation	Devonian	
Bílá hora Formation	Cretaceous	
Čelechovice Formation	Devonian	
Čelechovice Limestone Formation	Devonian	
Černín Beds Formation	Ordovician	
Choteč Formation	Devonian	
Chýnice Formation	Devonian	
Cypriš Formation	Neogene	
Děčín Formation	Paleogene	
Daleje and Hlubočepy beds Group/Choteč Limestone Formation	Devonian	
Daleje and Hlubočepy beds Group/Daleje Shale Formation	Devonian	
Daleje and Hlubočepy beds Group/Suchomasty Limestone Formation	Devonian	
Daleje and Hlubočepy beds Group/Třebotov Bed Formation	Devonian	
Daleje and Hlubočepy beds Group/Třebotov Limestone Formation	Devonian	
Daleje and Hlubočepy beds Group/Třebotov Shale Formation	Devonian	
Daleje Formation	Devonian	
Dobrotivá Formation	Ordovician	
Dobrotivá Formation	Ordovician	
Dvorce Formation	Devonian	
Ernstbrunn Formation	Jurassic	
Hady Formation	Carboniferous, Devonian	
Hlubočepy limestones Formation	Devonian	
Jince Formation	Cambrian	
Jizera Formation	Cretaceous	
Jizera Group/Teplice Formation	Cretaceous	
Kačák Schichten Formation	Devonian	
Karviná Formation	Carboniferous	
Karviná beds Formation	Carboniferous	
Klabava Formation	Ordovician	
Kladno Formation	Carboniferous	
Koněprusy Formation	Devonian	
Kopanina Formation	Silurian	
Kopanina (E2) Formation	Silurian	
Kopřivnice Formation	Cretaceous	
Koryčany Formation	Cretaceous	
Koryčany Formation	Cretaceous	
Kosov Formation	Ordovician	
Kotýs Limestone Formation	Devonian	
Kounov Formation	Carboniferous	
Kozel Formation	Silurian	
Králův Dvůr Formation	Ordovician	
Krtiny Formation	Devonian	
Krtiny Limestone Formation	Devonian	
Králův Dvůr Formation	Ordovician	
Králův Dvůr Formation	Ordovician	
Králův Dvůr (D5) Formation	Ordovician	
Lažánky Formation	Devonian	
Letná Formation	Ordovician	
Letovice Formation	Permian	
Libeň Formation	Ordovician	
Líšeň Formation	Devonian	
Liteň Formation	Silurian	
Liteň (E1) Formation	Silurian	
Litohlavy Formation	Silurian	
Lochkov Formation	Devonian	
Lochkov Limestone Group/Kosoř Limestone Formation	Devonian	
Lochkov Limestone Group/Lochkov Beds Formation	Devonian	
Lochkov Limestone Group/Lower Koněprusy Limestone Formation	Devonian	
Lochkov limestone Group/Radotín limestone Formation	Devonian	
Lochkow Formation	Devonian	
Lockhov Formation	Devonian	
Luckowska Formation	Cretaceous	
Macocha Formation	Devonian	
Menilite Formation	Paleogene	
Middle Iser Shales Formation	Cretaceous	
Middle Letovice Formation	Permian	
Milina Formation	Ordovician	
Most Formation	Neogene	
Motol Formation	Silurian	
Muschelkalk Formation	Triassic	
Myslejovice Formation	Carboniferous	
Nové Sedlo Formation	Paleogene	
Nurschan Coal seam Formation	Carboniferous	
Odolov Formation	Czech Republic	
Olivetská hora Formation	Cretaceous	
Ostrava Formation	Czech Republic	
Otovice Formation	Permian	
Padochov Formation	Permian	
Peruc Formation	Cretaceous	
Plaňava Formation	Cretaceous	
Polypiers Formation	Cretaceous	
Polypiers redepose Group/Bílá hora Formation	Cretaceous	
Polypiers redeposes Group/Bílá hora Formation	Cretaceous	
Požáry Formation	Devonian, Silurian	
Požáry Formation	Silurian	
Praha Formation	Devonian	
Přídolí Schichten Formation	Silurian	
Přídolí Schichten Formation	Silurian	
Přídolí Formation	Silurian	
Priesener Formation	Cretaceous	
Prosečné Formation	Permian	
Prosecne Formation	Permian	
PPřídolí Formation	Silurian	
Radnice Formation	Carboniferous	
Radotín Formation	Devonian	
Roblín Schichten Formation	Devonian	
Rohatce Formation	Cretaceous	
Šárka Formation	Ordovician	
Semily Formation	Carboniferous	
Senice Formation	Cambrian	
Skryje Formation	Cambrian	
Skryje and Tyrovice Formation	Cambrian	
Slaný Formation	Carboniferous	
Slaný Formation	Carboniferous	
Sokolov Formation	Neogene	
Soláň Formation	Cretaceous	
Srbsko Formation	Devonian	
Srbsko Formation	Devonian	
Srbsko Beds Group/Kacak Shales Formation	Devonian	
Srbsko Beds Group/Roblin Beds	Devonian	
Srbsko Schichten	Devonian	
Srbsko Formation	Devonian	
Stínava Formation	Devonian	
Štramberk Limestone	Jurassic	
Štramberk Limestone	Jurassic	
Submenilitic Formation	Paleogene	
Teplice Formation	Cretaceous	
Těšín Formation	Cretaceous	
Třebotov Formation	Devonian	
Třebotov Limestone	Devonian	
Třenice Formation	Ordovician	
Upper Králův Dvůr Formation	Ordovician	
Vilémovice Formation	Devonian	
Vilémovice Limestone	Devonian	
Vinice Formation	Ordovician	
Vrbno and Rejvíz Formation	Devonian	
Vrchlabí Formation	Permian	
Zahořany Formation	Ordovician	
Zahořany Formation	Ordovician	
Želkovice Formation	Silurian	
Zlíchov Formation	Devonian	
Zlíchov Formation	Devonian	
Zlíchov Limestone	Devonian	
Zlíchov Limestone	Devonian	
Žacléř Formation	Carboniferous	

== See also ==
- Lists of fossiliferous stratigraphic units in Europe
