= Leitha Limestone =

Geological formation in Central Europe

- Stratigraphic range: Mid-Late Miocene (Badenian); ~16.0–7.2 Ma
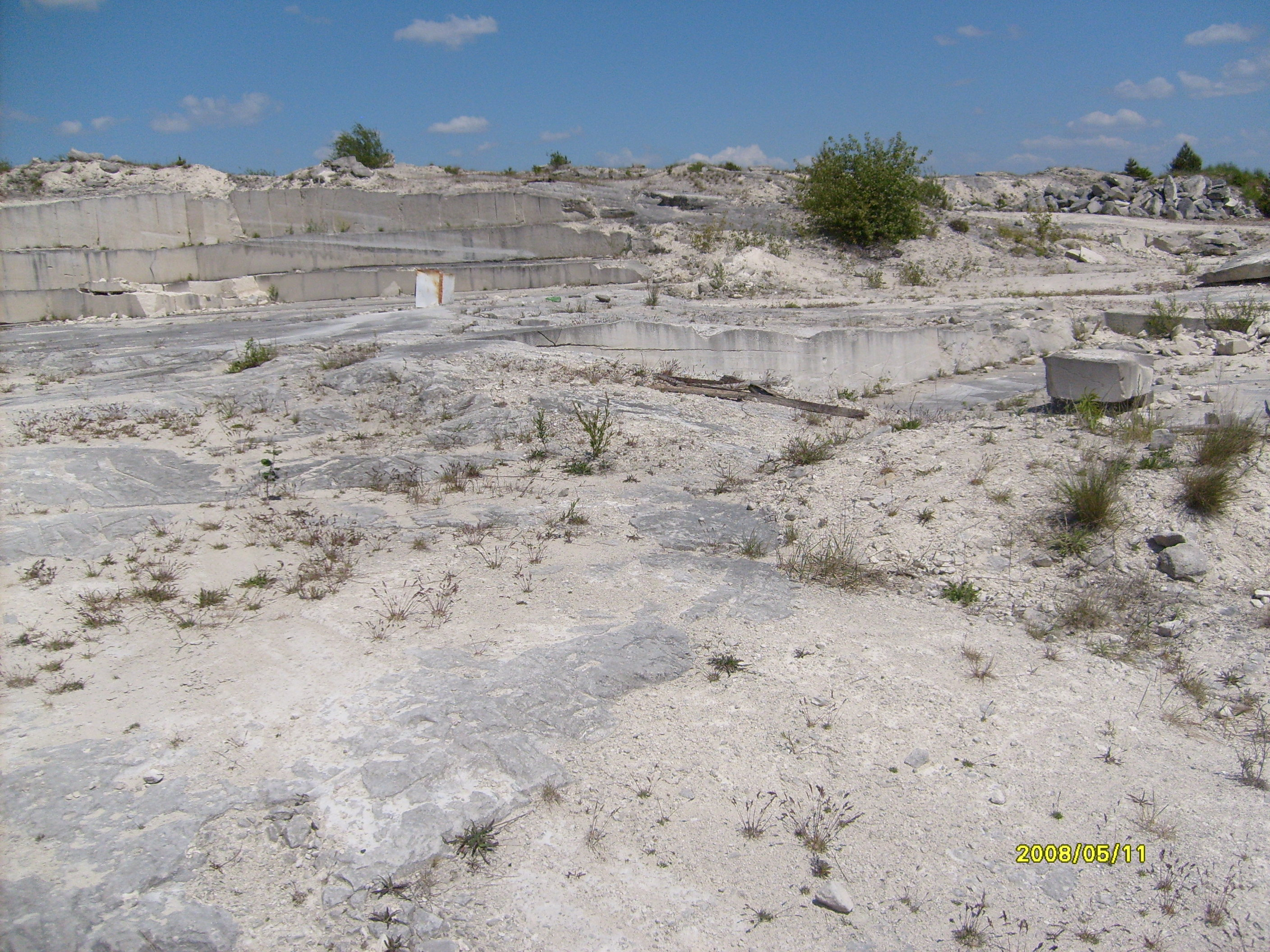
- Old quarry in Fertőrákos
- Type: Formation
- Unit of: Baden Group

Lithology
- Primary: Limestone

Location
- Country: Austria; Czech Republic; Hungary; Poland

The Leitha Limestone is a geologic formation in Austria, Czech Republic, Hungary and Poland. It preserves fossils dated to the Middle to Late Miocene period.

The type locality is the Leitha Mountains in Austria. The limestone from here was used extensively for buildings and utilised by the sculptors in Vienna, Bratislava, Sopron and other cities.

== Fossil content ==
Various fossils have been found in the formation:

- Aetobatis irregularis
- Araloselachus cuspidata
- Carcharias (Hypoprion) sp.
- Carcharias (Aprionodon) cf. collata
- Carcharodon hastalis
- Cetotherium priscum
- Coris sigismundi
- Eugaleus latus
- Galeocerdo aduncus
- Galeus aduncus
- Galeus cf. canis
- Halitherium schinzii
- Heterodelphis leiodontus
- Hemipristis serra
- Isurus desorii
- Kentriodon fuchsii
- Megalodon
- Metaxytherium medium
- Myliobatis cf. meridionalis
- Notidanus primigenius
- Odontaspis acutissima
- Odontaspis macrota
- Oxyrhina xyphodon
- Pachyacanthus suessii
- Prionodon sp.
- Raja sp.
- Sparus sp.
- Symphodus westneati
- Wainwrightilabrus agassizi

== See also ==
- List of fossiliferous stratigraphic units in Austria
- List of fossiliferous stratigraphic units in Czech Republic
- List of fossiliferous stratigraphic units in Poland
