= Cimarron Range =

Cimarron Range may refer to:

- Cimarron Range in the Sangre de Cristo Mountains in New Mexico
- Cimarron Ridge in the San Juan Mountains
