= Aïn el Guettar Formation =

Geologic formation in Tunisia

- Stratigraphic range: Late Aptian-Late Albian; ~115–100.5 Ma
- Type: Formation
- Sub-units: Chenini & Oum ed Diab Members
- Underlies: Zebbag Formation
- Overlies: Douiret Formation

Lithology
- Primary: Sandstone
- Other: Conglomerate, mudstone

Location
- Location: Sahara Desert
- Coordinates: 33.2°N 10.3°E
- Approximate paleocoordinates: 15.9°N 10.3°E
- Region: Tataouine
- Country: Tunisia

Type section
- Named for: 'Aïn el Guettar
- Aïn el Guettar Formation (Tunisia)

The Aïn el Guettar Formation is a geological formation in Tunisia, whose strata date back to the Late Aptian to Late Albian stages of the Cretaceous period. The lithology consists of coarse sandstones with occasional conglomerates and mudstones. Dinosaur remains are among the fossils that have been recovered from the formation.

== Stratigraphy ==
The Aïn el Guettar Formation is divided into at least 3 members, which represent different depositional environments. In ascending order these are: the Chenini Member, the Oum ed Diab Member and the Jebel El Mra Member.

== Vertebrate paleofauna ==
The Ain el Guettar Formation during the Early Cretaceous period was a marsh-like habitat with swamps and plenty of water. The most famous dinosaur discoveries made here include Carcharodontosaurus and Spinosaurus.

Dinosaurs
| Genus | Species | Location | Material | Notes | Images |
|---|---|---|---|---|---|
| Carcharodontosaurus | C. saharicus | | | A Carcharodontosaurid Theropod | Carcharodontosaurus (flipped, cropped) |
| Spinosaurus | cf. S.aegyptiacus | | | A Spinosaurid theropod | |
| Tataouinea | T. hannibalis | | | A Nigersaurine Sauropod | Tataouinea skeleton |
| Iguanodontidae | Iguanodontidae indet. | | | | |
| Sauropoda indet. | Sauropoda indet. | | | | |
| Abelisauridae | Abelisauride indet. | | | | |
| Carcharodontosauridae | Carcharodontosauridae indet. | | | | |

Crocodylomorphs
| Genus | Species | Location | Material | Notes | Images |
|---|---|---|---|---|---|
| Sarcosuchus | cf. Sarchosuchus | | | A Pholidosaurid Crocodylomorph | Sarcosuchus Illustration |
| Araripesuchus | A.sp | | | A notosuchian crocodylomorph | Araripesuchus wegeneri |
| Crocodyliformes | crocodyliformes indet. | | | | |

Pterosaurs
| Genus | Species | Location | Material | Notes | Images |
|---|---|---|---|---|---|
| Ornithocheiridae | Ornithocheiridae indet. | | | | |

Fish
| Genus | Species | Location | Material | Notes | Images |
|---|---|---|---|---|---|
| Mawsonia | M.sp. | | | A Coelacanth | Mawsonia scaling |
| Caturus | C. sp. | | | | |
| Onchopristis | O. dunklei | | | | |
| Hybodus | H. sp. | | | | |
| Lepidotes | L.sp. | | | | |

== See also ==
- List of dinosaur-bearing rock formations
- Geology of Tunisia
