= Masuk =

Masuk may refer to:

- Masuk High School, a public high school of Monroe, Connecticut, USA
- Poonsak Masuk, Thai footballer known as Nui
- Wuttichai Masuk, Thai boxer
- Masuk Mia Jony, Bangladeshi footballer
- Masuk Formation, Mesozoic geologic formation in the United States
