= Marnes de Châlins =

Geological formation in France

- Stratigraphic range: Norian-Rhaetian; ~220–202 Ma
- Type: Geological formation

Lithology
- Primary: Marl

Location
- Coordinates: 46.9°N 5.7°E
- Approximate paleocoordinates: 29.2°N 8.8°E
- Region: Franche-Comté
- Country: France
- Extent: Jura

Type section
- Named for: Châlins
- Marnes de Châlins (France)

The Marnes de Châlins (French for Châlins Marl) is a Late Triassic (Norian to Rhaetian) geologic formation in France. Dinosaur remains are among the fossils that have been recovered from the formation, although none have yet been referred to a specific genus.

== Fossil content ==
The formation has provided the following fossils:

- Reptiles
  - Plateosaurus sp.
  - Gresslyosaurus cf. plieningeri
  - ?Prosauropoda indet.
- Fish
  - Grozonodon candaui
  - Lissodus lepagei
  - L. minimus
  - ?Gyrolepis sp.
  - Ptychoceratodus rectangulus

== See also ==
- List of dinosaur-bearing rock formations
  - List of stratigraphic units with indeterminate dinosaur fossils
