= Margyang Formation =

Geologic formation in China

- Type: Geological formation

Location
- Country: China

The Margyang Formation is a Mesozoic geologic formation in China. Dinosaur remains diagnostic to the genus level are among the fossils that have been recovered from the formation.

== See also ==
- List of dinosaur-bearing rock formations
- List of stratigraphic units with few dinosaur genera
