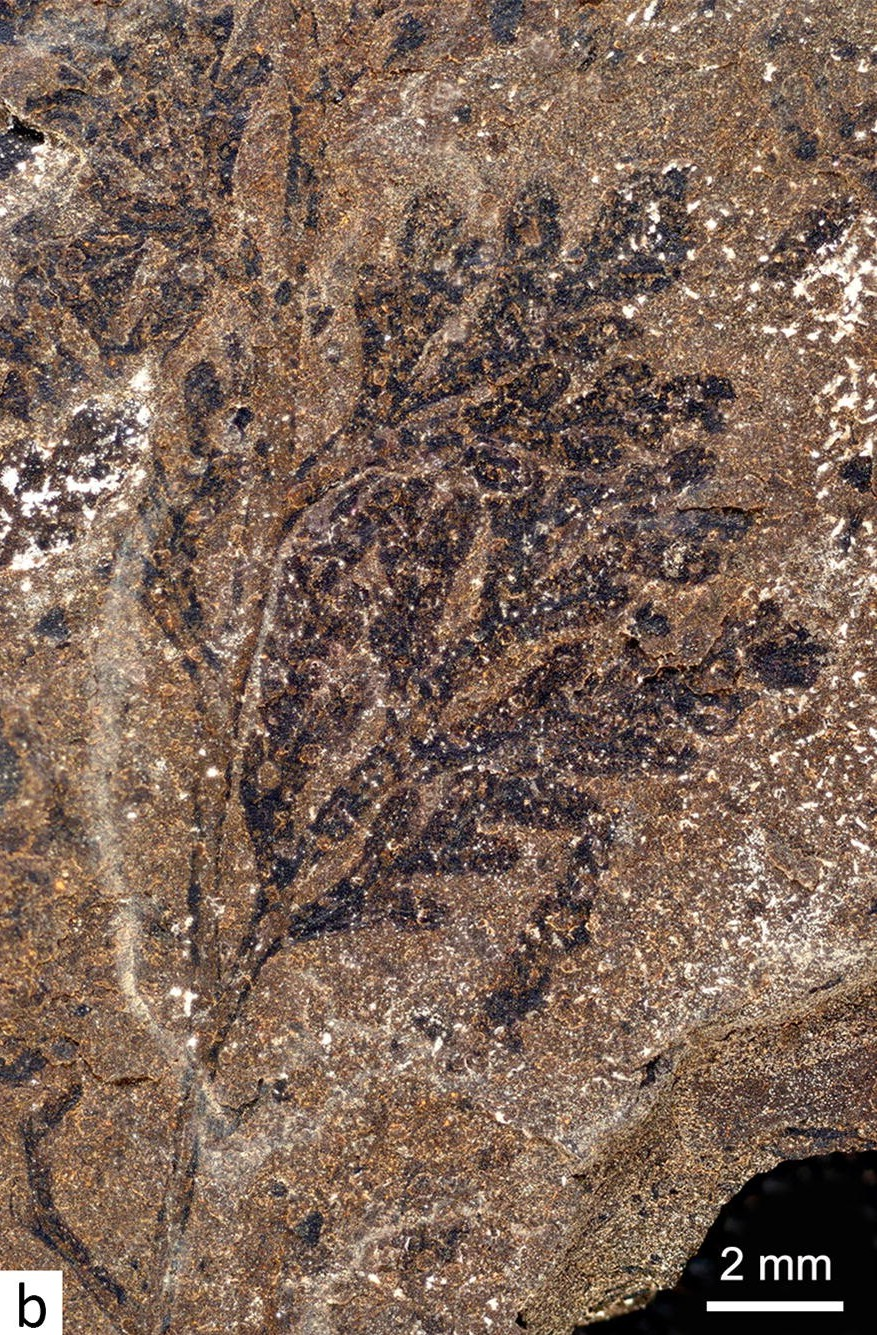
- Coniopteris sp. from the Mecsek Coal Formation, Hungary, Hettangian

Scientific classification
- Kingdom: Plantae
- Clade: Tracheophytes
- Division: Polypodiophyta
- Class: Polypodiopsida
- Subclass: Polypodiidae
- Genus: †Coniopteris; Brongniart 1849

Type species
- Coniopteris murrayana Brongniart 1835

Species
- C. bella Li, Xiu, Tan & Tian, 2023; C. burejensis Li, Xiu, Tan & Tian, 2023; C. frutiformis Douglas 1973; C. glaesifilix Wang, Tao, Zhang, Wang, & Shi in Wang et al. 2026; C. haifanggouensis Li & Tian in Li et al., 2025; C. hymenophylloides Seward 1900; C. murrayana Brongniart 1835

Synonyms
- Polystichites C. Presl in Sternberg, 1838

= Coniopteris =

Extinct genus of ferns

Coniopteris is an extinct genus of Mesozoic fern leaves. It was widespread over both hemispheres during the Jurassic and Early Cretaceous, with over 130 species having been described. Most species of Coniopteris probably had a herbaceous habit. Coniopteris laciniata had tufts of leaves sprouting from intervals of a thin, creeping rhizome. Coniopteris is traditionally assumed to have been a member of Dicksoniaceae (which are mostly tree ferns) or a close relative of Thyrsopteris. However, these affinites have been doubted by a number of authors. A 2020 cladistic analysis found it to be a stem group of Polypodiales, as many Coniopteris species share with these ferns vertically oriented and an incomplete annulus. However, this feature is not preserved among many Coniopteris species, and several species from the Northern Hemisphere a complete and obliquely oriented annulus, suggesting a Cyatheales (to which Dicksoniaceae belongs) affinity for at least these species, though they are alternatively suggested to be close to the base of Cyatheales. The genus is technically a junior synonym of the little used Polystichites, but was conserved by the ICZN in 2013. Some authors suggest a range of Early Jurassic-early Late Cretaceous for the genus, while others suggest a more expansive range spanning from the Middle Triassic to the Eocene.
