= Jingxing Formation =

Mesozoic geologic formation in China

- Type: Geological formation

Location
- Region: Yunnan
- Country: China

The Jingxing Formation is a Mesozoic geologic formation in China. Dinosaur remains diagnostic to the genus level are among the fossils that have been recovered from the formation.

== Paleofauna ==
- Tyrannosaurus lanpingensis - "Teeth." - (Tyrannosauroid indet)

== See also ==
- List of dinosaur-bearing rock formations
  - List of stratigraphic units with few dinosaur genera
