= Villigen Formation =

Jurassic geologic formation in Switzerland

- Stratigraphic range: Oxfordian; ~164–156 Ma
- Type: Geological formation

Location
- Country: Switzerland

The Villigen Formation is a Jurassic geologic formation in Switzerland. Dinosaur remains are among the fossils that have been recovered from the formation, although none have yet been referred to a specific genus.

== See also ==
- List of dinosaur-bearing rock formations
  - List of stratigraphic units with indeterminate dinosaur fossils
