= Lisangou Formation =

Geological formation in China

- Type: Geological formation

Location
- Country: China

The Lisangou Formation is a Mesozoic geologic formation in China. Dinosaur remains diagnostic to the genus level are among the fossils that have been recovered from the formation.

== Paleofauna ==
Psittacosaurus guyangensis - "[Four] fragmentary individuals, one with partial skull."

P. osborni

== See also ==
- List of dinosaur-bearing rock formations
  - List of stratigraphic units with few dinosaur genera
