= Palau Formation =

Geologic formation in Mexico

- Stratigraphic range: Mesozoic
- Type: Geological formation

Location
- Country: Mexico

The Palau Formation is a Mesozoic geologic formation in Mexico. Dinosaur fossils have been recovered from the formation, although none have yet been referred to a specific genus.

== See also ==
- Lists of dinosaur-bearing stratigraphic units
  - List of stratigraphic units with indeterminate dinosaur fossils
