= Chenini Member =

Geological formation in Tunisia

- Stratigraphic range: Late Aptian-Early Albian; ~115–109 Ma
- Type: Member
- Unit of: Aïn el Guettar Formation
- Underlies: Oum ed Diab Member
- Overlies: Douiret Formation

Lithology
- Primary: Sandstone
- Other: Conglomerate, mudstone

Location
- Location: Sahara Desert
- Coordinates: 33.2°N 10.3°E
- Approximate paleocoordinates: 15.9°N 10.3°E
- Region: Tataouine
- Country: Tunisia

Type section
- Named for: Chenini
- Chenini Member (Tunisia)

The Chenini Member is a geological member of the Ain el Guettar Formation in Tunisia, whose strata date back to the Late Aptian to Early Albian stages of the Cretaceous period. The lithology consists of coarse sandstones with occasional conglomerates and mudstones. Dinosaur remains are among the fossils that have been recovered from the formation.

== Vertebrate paleofauna ==
The Chenini Member during the Early Cretaceous period was a marsh-like swampy habitat. The most famous dinosaur discoveries made here include Carcharodontosaurus and Spinosaurus.

Theropods of the Chenini member
Genus	Species	Location	Material	Notes	Images
Spinosaurus	S.cf. aegyptiacus			A spinosaurid theropod	Life restoration
Carcharodontosaurus	C. saharicus			A carcharodontosaurid theropod	Life restoration
Sauropoda	Sauropoda indet.				
Iguanodontia	Iguanodontia indet.				

Pterosaurs of the Chenini member
Genus	Species	Location	Material	Notes	Images
Ornithocheiridae	Ornithocheiridae indet.				

== See also ==
- List of dinosaur-bearing rock formations
- Geology of Tunisia
