= Mahadek Formation =

Geologic formation in India

- Stratigraphic range: Late Cretaceous, Maastrichtian
- Type: Geological formation
- Underlies: N/A
- Overlies: N/A

Lithology
- Primary: Sandstone

Location
- Coordinates: 25.3° N, 91.3° E
- Region: Meghalaya
- Country: India
- Mahadek Formation (India)

The Mahadek Formation is a Mesozoic geologic formation in India. Dinosaur remains are among the fossils that have been recovered from the formation, although none have yet been referred to the genus or species level. These include the partial skeleton of a titanosaurian sauropod. Additionally, teeth similar to an elasmobranch, as well as teeth and postcranial material of a reptile (identified as a mosasaur), are known from Krem Puri Caves rocks, which are also a part of this formation.

== See also ==
- List of dinosaur-bearing rock formations
  - List of stratigraphic units with indeterminate dinosaur fossils
