= On Gong Formation =

Geological formation in Inner Mongolia, China

- Stratigraphic range: Early Cretaceous
- Type: Geological formation

Location
- Region: Inner Mongolia
- Country: China

The On Gong Formation is a Mesozoic geologic formation in China. Dinosaur remains diagnostic to the genus level are among the fossils that have been recovered from the formation.

== Paleofauna ==
- Mongolosaurus haplodon

== See also ==
- List of dinosaur-bearing rock formations
  - List of stratigraphic units with few dinosaur genera
