= Al-Khod Conglomerate =

Geologic formation in Oman

- Stratigraphic range: Maastrichtian
- Type: Geological formation

Location
- Country: Oman

The Al-Khod Conglomerate is a Mesozoic geologic formation in Oman. Dinosaur remains belonging to ornithischians, theropods and sauropods are among the fossils that have been recovered from the formation, although none have yet been referred to a specific genus, which belong to one of very few records of dinosaur remains currently known from Oman.

== Fossil content ==
- Bivalvia indet.
- Corbiculidae indet.
- Gastropoda indet.
- Hadrosauridae indet.
- Neosuchia indet.
- Crocodyliformes indet.
- Ostreidae indet.
- Ornithischia indet.
- Ornithopoda indet.
- Sauropoda indet.
- Testudines indet.

== See also ==
- List of dinosaur-bearing rock formations
- List of stratigraphic units with indeterminate dinosaur fossils
