= Tazukawa Formation =

Geologic formation in Japan

- Type: Geological formation
- Unit of: Monobe Group

Location
- Country: Japan

The Tazukawa Formation is a Mesozoic geologic formation in Japan. Dinosaur remains are among the fossils that have been recovered from the formation, although none have yet been referred to a specific genus.

== See also ==
- List of dinosaur-bearing rock formations
  - List of stratigraphic units with indeterminate dinosaur fossils
