= Priesener Formation =

Geologic formation in Czech Republic

- Stratigraphic range: Coniacian
- Type: Geological formation

Location
- Coordinates: 50.0°N 15.7°E
- Approximate paleocoordinates: 40.1°N 15.1°E
- Region: Vychodocesky
- Country: Czech Republic
- Priesener Formation (Czech Republic)

The Priesener Formation is a Coniacian geologic formation in the Czech Republic. Dinosaur remains diagnostic to the genus level are among the fossils that have been recovered from the formation.

== Fossil content ==
- Albisaurus scutifer (?Dinosaur indet)

== See also ==
- List of fossiliferous stratigraphic units in Czech Republic
- List of stratigraphic units with few dinosaur genera
