= Craie Chloritee =

Geologic formation in France

Craie Chloritée
- Stratigraphic range: Campanian
- Type: Geological formation

The Craie Chloritée is a chalky Mesozoic geologic formation, located in the Normandy area of northern France. Dinosaur remains are among the fossils that have been recovered from the formation, although none have yet been referred to a specific genus.

== See also ==
- List of dinosaur-bearing rock formations
  - List of stratigraphic units with indeterminate dinosaur fossils
