= Cokedale Formation =

Geologic formation in the United States

- Stratigraphic range: Campanian
- Type: Geological formation
- Unit of: Livingston Group
- Underlies: Miner Creek Formation

The Cokedale Formation is a Mesozoic geologic formation in the United States. Dinosaur remains are among the fossils that have been recovered from the formation, although none have yet been referred to a specific genus.

The Cokedale Formation is the oldest unit of the Livingston Group.

== See also ==
- List of dinosaur-bearing rock formations
  - List of stratigraphic units with indeterminate dinosaur fossils
