= Sables de Cherre =

Geologic formation in France

- Type: Geological formation

Location
- Country: France

The Sables de Cherre is a Mesozoic geologic formation in France. Dinosaur remains are among the fossils that have been recovered from the formation, although none have yet been referred to a specific genus.

== See also ==
- List of dinosaur-bearing rock formations
  - List of stratigraphic units with indeterminate dinosaur fossils
