= Cimarron Ridge Formation =

Geologic formation in the United States

- Stratigraphic range: Maastrichtian
- Type: Geological formation

The Cimarron Ridge Formation is a Mesozoic geologic formation in the United States. Dinosaur remains are among the fossils that have been recovered from the formation, although none have yet been referred to a specific genus.

== Name ==
The formation takes its name from Cimarron Ridge in southwestern Colorado.

== See also ==
- List of dinosaur-bearing rock formations
  - List of stratigraphic units with indeterminate dinosaur fossils
