= Komlosaurus =

Komlosaurus Temporal range: Hettangian-Sinemurian ~201–191 Ma

Trace fossil classification
- Kingdom: Animalia
- Phylum: Chordata
- Class: Reptilia
- Clade: Dinosauria
- Clade: Saurischia
- Clade: Theropoda
- Genus: †Komlosaurus; Kordos, 1983

Type ichnospecies
- †Komlosaurus carbonis Kordos, 1983

Ichnogenus of dinosaurs

Komlosaurus ("Komlo lizard") is an ichnogenus of theropod dinosaur from the Early Jurassic of Baranya, Hungary. The type species, Komlosaurus carbonis, was described by Kordos in 1983. The type remains come from the Mecsek Coal Formation, from the Middle Hettangian to the Early Sinemurian, and comprise several footprints.

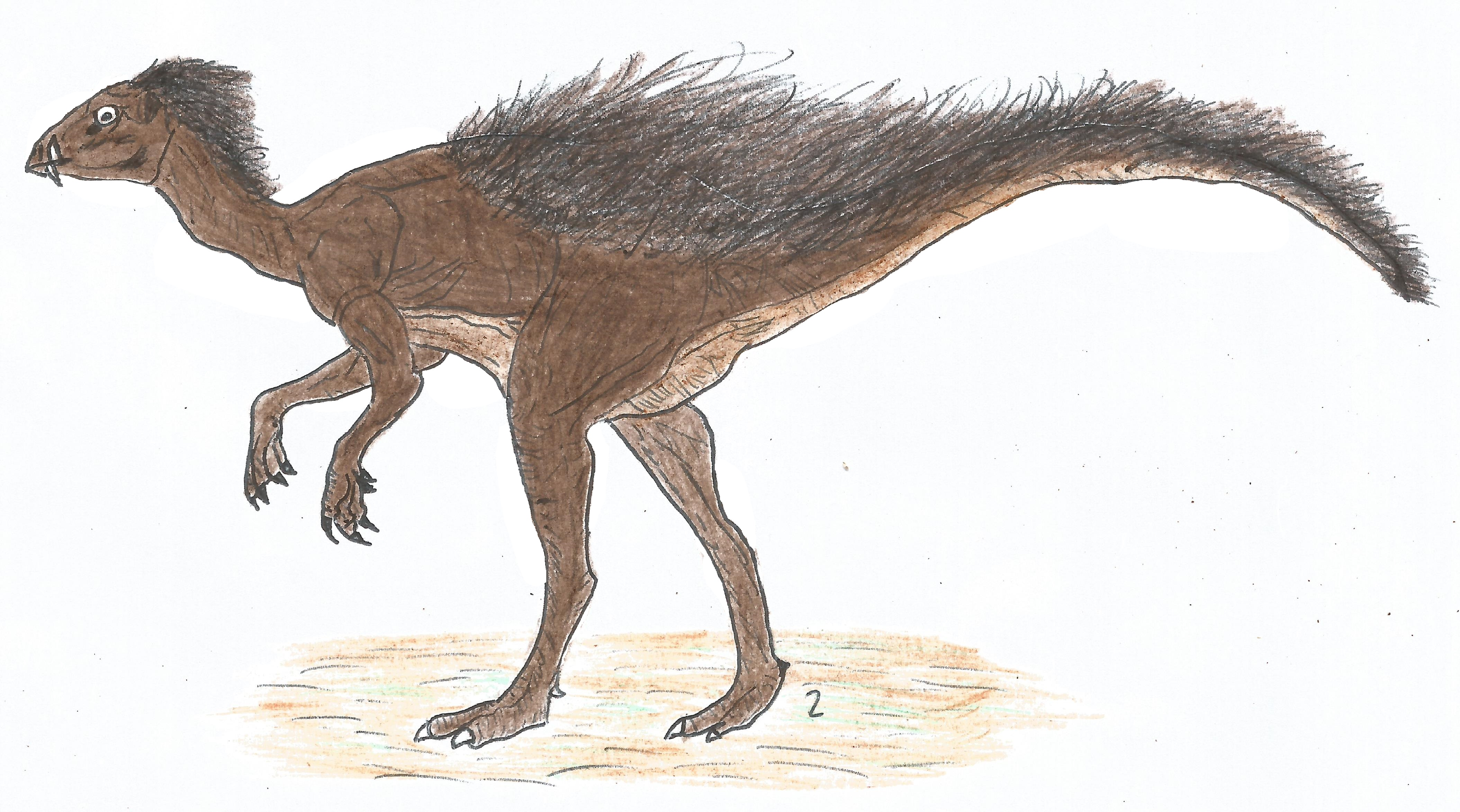
Outdated restoration as an ornithischian

== Description ==
In the Hettangian/Sinemurian deposits of the Komló area (Mecsek Mountain, Hungary), footprints of Jurassic dinosaurs assigned to the ichnospecies K. carbonis are the only published palaeontological data of vertebrates in this region; however, several fossils of plants and pollen has been discovered there. The footprints, which form tracks, occur in several levels on bedding planes of fine-grained sediments. The largest occurrence of fossils is at the Karolina and Vasas strip mines in the Mecsek Mountain nearby Pécs. The footprints collection of Komlosaurus can be seen at the Hungarian Natural History Museum, Budapest, Hungary, with a few specimens in the Local History Museum of Komló, Hungary.

== Classification ==
Komlosaurus was classified originally as an ichnogenus of an ornithopod dinosaur, but new traces found (the specimens Muz. PIG 1624.II.1, 1624.II.2, 1624.II.3 and 1624.II.4) led to consider Komlosaurus as footprints made by a theropod, and also as a possible synonym for other dinosaur ichnogenus, assigning the smaller footprints to Grallator tuberosus and the larger, thinner ones to Kayentapus soltykovensis. The findings made in 1988 in the Karolina valley allowed recover two separate traces of the area, which have several morphological differences with respect both to Grallator and Kayentapus, the reason why is considered that Komlosaurus is enough different in respect to the more robust grallatorids tracks to be a valid ichnogenus. The traces of Komlosaurus are characterized by being tridactyle, with long and thin fingers, with frequently curved impressions, with a division angle between the II-IV digits of 72 degrees, even with impressions of the footpad and the hallux. The abundance of traces, the variation in size of the individuals (with footprints between 9.5 and 26 centimeters long, and 7 to 16 centimeters wide), the similar stride velocity of them - from 6 to 14 kilometers per hour - and the fact that they possess the same type of preservation suggests that these animals moved in groups.

== See also ==
- List of dinosaur ichnogenera
