= Williams Formation =

Geologic formation in California, United States

- Stratigraphic range: Late Cretaceous
- Type: Geological formation

Location
- Region: California
- Country: United States

The Williams Formation is a Mesozoic geologic formation. Dinosaur remains (including hadrosaurid fragments) are among the fossils that have been recovered from the formation, although none have yet been referred to a specific genus. In 1996 Gino Calvano found foot bones, two cervical vertebrae, and a phalanx (toe) from a hadrosaur in this formation, along the western base of the Santa Ana Mountains in Orange County, California.

== See also ==
- List of dinosaur-bearing rock formations
  - List of stratigraphic units with indeterminate dinosaur fossils
