= Marnes à Belemnopsis latesulcatus Formation =

French geological formation

- Stratigraphic range: Callovian
- Type: Geological formation
- Area: Normandy

Lithology
- Primary: Marl, Limestone

Location
- Region: Calvados Province
- Country: France

The Marnes à Belemnopsis latesulcatus Formation is a Jurassic geologic formation in France. It is so named because it exists within the Belemnopsis latesulcatus biostratigraphic zone. It predominantly consists of bioturbated variegated marl and lenticular concetionary wackestone

== Vertebrate fauna ==
Dinosaur remains diagnostic to the genus level are among the fossils that have been recovered from the formation. A referred specimen of Loricatosaurus priscus (MHBR 001) was found in this unit and is the source of the name Lexovisaurus when Hoffstetter (1957) coined that genus for the dubious species O. durobrivensis (to which he referred MNBR 001), because the area in which MHBR 001 was found used to be inhabited by the Lexovii, a tribe of the ancient Gauls.

== See also ==
- List of dinosaur-bearing rock formations
  - List of stratigraphic units with few dinosaur genera
