= Argiles du Gault =

Geologic formation in northern France

- Stratigraphic range: Albian
- Type: Geological formation
- Overlies: Poudingue Ferrugineux

Lithology
- Primary: Clay

Location
- Region: Normandy
- Country: France

The Argiles du Gault is an Albian geologic formation in northern France, it is equivalent to the Gault of southern England. Dinosaur remains are among the fossils that have been recovered from the formation, although none have yet been referred to a specific genus.

== See also ==
- Gault
- List of dinosaur-bearing rock formations
  - List of stratigraphic units with indeterminate dinosaur fossils
