= Kalahari Deposits =

Early Cretaceous geologic formation in South Africa

- Stratigraphic range: Campanian-Maastrichtian; ~80–66 Ma
- Type: Geological formation

Lithology
- Primary: Conglomerate
- Other: Mudstone

Location
- Coordinates: 29.5°S 18.4°E
- Approximate paleocoordinates: 44.2°S 2.3°E
- Region: Western Cape
- Country: South Africa

Type section
- Named for: Kalahari Desert
- Kalahari Deposits (South Africa)

The Kalahari Deposits is an Late Cretaceous (Campanian to Maastrichtian) geologic formation in South Africa. Dinosaur remains diagnostic to the genus level are among the fossils that have been recovered from the formation. The depositional environment is described as a crater lake where poorly lithified, concretionary conglomerate and volcaniclastic, intraclastic, calcareous mudstone were deposited under quiet subaqueous conditions, probably a "crater-fill succession above an olivine-melilitie intrusion".

== Fossil content ==
Color key: Taxon / Reclassified taxon / Taxon falsely reported as present / Dubious taxon or junior synonym / Ichnotaxon / Ootaxon / Morphotaxon	Notes; Uncertain or tentative taxa are in small text; ~~crossed out~~ taxa are discredited.

=== Dinosaurs ===
==== Ornithischians ====
Ornithischians of the Kalahari Deposits
Genus	Species	Location	Stratigraphic position	Material	Notes	Image
Kangnasaurus	K. coetzeei	Western Cape, South Africa	Campanian to Maastrichtian	Tooth, postcranial elements including a femur.	A elasmarian ornithopod	

== See also ==
- List of dinosaur-bearing rock formations
  - List of stratigraphic units with few dinosaur genera
