= Livingston Formation =

Geological formation in Montana, USA

Livingston Group
- Stratigraphic range: Late Cretaceous
- Type: Geological formation
- Sub-units: Cokedale Formation, Miner Creek Formation, Billman Creek Formation, Hoppers Formation
- Underlies: Fort Union Formation
- Overlies: Eagle Sandstone

Location
- Region: Montana
- Country: United States

The Livingston Group is a geological formation in Montana whose strata date back to the Late Cretaceous. Dinosaur remains are among the fossils that have been recovered from the formation.

There are four units of the Livingston Group (from oldest to youngest): Cokedale Formation, Miner Creek Formation, Billman Creek Formation, and Hoppers Formation.

== See also ==
- List of dinosaur-bearing rock formations
