= Billman Creek Formation =

Geologic formation in Montana, United States

- Stratigraphic range: Maastrichtian
- Type: Geological formation
- Unit of: Livingston Group
- Underlies: Hoppers Formation
- Overlies: Miner Creek Formation

Location
- Region: Montana
- Country: United States of America

The Billman Creek Formation is a Mesozoic geologic formation in south-central Montana. Dinosaur remains are among the fossils that have been recovered from the formation, although none have yet been referred to a specific genus.

The Billman Creek Formation is a unit of the Livingston Group.

== See also ==
- List of dinosaur-bearing rock formations
  - List of stratigraphic units with indeterminate dinosaur fossils
