= Oum ed Diab Member =

Fossil-bearing rock formation in Tunisia

- Stratigraphic range: Middle-Upper Albian
- Type: Member
- Unit of: Ain el Guettar Formation
- Underlies: Zebbag Formation
- Overlies: Chenini Member

Lithology
- Primary: Sandstone
- Other: Claystone

Location
- Coordinates: 32.6°N 10.1°E
- Approximate paleocoordinates: 15.2°N 9.4°E
- Region: Tataouine
- Country: Tunisia
- Oum ed Diab Member (Tunisia)

The Oum ed Diab Member is a middle-upper Albian geologic member, part of the Aïn el Guettar Formation of Tunisia. Dinosaur remains are among the fossils that have been recovered from the formation.

== Vertebrate fauna ==
=== Fish ===
Fish
Genus	Species	Location	Material	Notes	Images
Caturus	C. sp.				
Onchopristis	O. dunklei				
Hybodus	H. sp.				
Lepidotes	L.sp.				

=== Archosaurs ===
Pseudosuchians
Genus	Species	Location	Material	Notes	Images
Crocodyliformes	crocodyliformes indet.				
Sarcosuchus	S. sp				
Araripesuchus	A.sp.				

Pterosaurs
Genus	Species	Location	Material	Notes	Images
Ornithocheiridae	Ornithocheiridae indet				

Dinosaurs
Genus	Species	Location	Material	Notes	Images
Abelisauridae	Abelisauride indet.				
Carcharodontosauridae	Carcharodontosauridae indet.				
Spinosaurus and/or possibly Spinosaurinae	S.sp.				
Tataouinea as well as indeterminate teeth	T.hannibalis				
iguanodontian	Iguanodontia indet.				

== See also ==
- List of dinosaur-bearing rock formations
- Geology of Tunisia
