= Newark Canyon Formation =

Mesozoic geological formation in Nevada

- Stratigraphic range: Early Cretaceous
- Type: Geological formation

Location
- Region: Nevada
- Country: US

The Newark Canyon Formation is a Mesozoic geologic formation in Nevada in the United States.

== Fossils ==
Dinosaur remains have been recovered from the formation, although none have yet been referred to a specific genus. These include a non-ankylosaurid ankylosaur (possibly nodosaurid), a non-hadrosaurid ornithopod, a primitive neoceratopsian, and a tyrannosauroid, all represented by teeth. Other dinosaur specimens are known but cannot be assigned to any specific clades due to their non-diagnostic nature.

== See also ==
- List of dinosaur-bearing rock formations
  - List of stratigraphic units with indeterminate dinosaur fossils
