= Baiying Bologai Formation =

Early Cretaceous geologic formation in Mongolia

- Stratigraphic range: Early Cretaceous; ~145–100 Ma
- Type: Geological formation

Lithology
- Primary: Conglomerate

Location
- Coordinates: 43.3°N 110.0°E
- Approximate paleocoordinates: 45.2°N 110.9°E
- Region: Ömnögovi Province
- Country: Mongolia
- Baiying Bologai Formation (Mongolia)

The Baiying Bologai Formation, in other literature named Bayan Bologai Formation, is an Early Cretaceous geologic formation in the Ömnögovi Province of Mongolia. Dinosaur remains are among the fossils that have been recovered from the formation, although none have yet been referred to a specific genus.

== Fossil content ==
The following fossils have been reported from the formation:

- Ankylosauridae indet.
- Hadrosauridae indet.

== See also ==
- List of dinosaur-bearing rock formations
  - List of stratigraphic units with indeterminate dinosaur fossils
- Alagteeg Formation
