= Matsuo Group =

Geologic formation in Japan

- Stratigraphic range: Hauterivian–Barremian
- Type: Geological formation

Location
- Region: Mie Prefecture
- Country: Japan

The Matsuo Group is an Early Cretaceous (Hauterivian - Barremian-aged) geologic formation in Japan. Dinosaur remains are among the fossils that have been recovered from the formation, although none have yet been referred to a specific genus ("Tobasaurus").

== See also ==
- List of dinosaur-bearing rock formations
  - List of stratigraphic units with indeterminate dinosaur fossils
