= Gerhartsreiter Schichten =

Geologic formation in Germany

- Stratigraphic range: Maastrichtian
- Type: Geological formation
- Underlies: Hachauer Schichten
- Overlies: Pattenauer Schichten

Lithology
- Primary: Marl, Sand

Location
- Region: Bavaria
- Country: Germany

The Gerhartsreiter Schichten is a Late Cretaceous (Maastrichtian age) geologic formation with outcrops in Bavaria, Germany.

== Fossils content ==
Dinosaur remains, including those of an indeterminate hadrosaur, are among the fossils that have been recovered from the formation, although none have yet been referred to a specific genus.

Color key: Taxon / Reclassified taxon / Taxon falsely reported as present / Dubious taxon or junior synonym / Ichnotaxon / Ootaxon / Morphotaxon	Notes; Uncertain or tentative taxa are in small text; ~~crossed out~~ taxa are discredited.

=== Fish ===
Bony fish of the Gerhartsreiter Schichten
Genus	Species	Location	Stratigraphic position	Material	Notes	Image
Alaconger	A. beauryi	Bavaria, Germany			A congrid eel	
Ampheristus	A. brevicauda	Bavaria, Germany			An cusk-eel	
Ampheristus	A. traunensis	Bavaria, Germany			An cusk-eel	
Archaulopus	A. acutus	Bavaria, Germany			An greeneye	
Argentina	A. voigti	Bavaria, Germany			An herring smelt	
Argyroberyx	A. dentatus	Bavaria, Germany			An spinyfin	
Auriculithus	A. pattersoni	Bavaria, Alemania			An marine hatchetfish	
Bavariconger	B. pollerspoecki	Bavaria, Germany			A conglid eel	
Bavariscopelus	B. bispinosus	Bavaria, Germany			An lanternfish	
Beauryia	B. medialis	Bavaria, Germany			An spinyfin	
Cowetaichthys	B. beaury	Bavaria, Germany			An beardfish	
Diretmus	D. primus	Bavaria, Germany			An silver spinyfin	
Holocentronotus	H. percomorphus	Bavaria, Germany			A holocentrid fish	
Isozen	I. beateae	Bavaria, Germany			A parazenid zeiform	
Kokenichthys	K. ensis	Bavaria, Germany			A osteoglossiform fish	
Palaeostomias	P. praematurus	Bavaria, Germany			An barbeled dragonfish	
Pfeilichthys	P. pfeili	Bavaria, Germany			A holocentrid fish	
Plesiopoma	P. otiosa	Bavaria, Germany			An bioluminescent lanternbelly	
Pollerspoeckia	P. siegsdorfensis	Bavaria, Germany			A pterothrissine albulid; closely related to the japanese gissu.	
Protobathylagus	P. effusus	Bavaria, Germany			An deep-sea smelt	
Protobythites	P. brzobohatyi	Bavaria, Germany			An cusk-eel	
Pteralbula	P. foreyi	Bavaria, Germany			A pterothrissine albulid	
Rhynchoconger	R. piger	Bavaria, Germany			A congrid eel	
Traubiella	T. anagoformis	Bavaria, Germany			A holocentid fish	
Traunichthys	T. pfeili	Bavaria, Germany			A holocentrid fish	

=== Echinoderms ===
Echinoderms of the Gerhartsreiter Schichten
Genus	Species	Location	Stratigraphic position	Material	Notes	Image
Manfredura	M. curvata	Bavaria, Germany			A ophiacanthid brittle star	

== See also ==
- List of dinosaur-bearing rock formations
  - List of stratigraphic units with indeterminate dinosaur fossils
