= Broadford Beds Formation =

Geologic formation in Scotland

- Stratigraphic range: Sinemurian; ~196–190 Ma
- Type: Geological formation
- Unit of: Lias Group
- Underlies: Pabay Shale Formation
- Overlies: Triassic rocks
- Thickness: 50–100 metres (160–330 ft)

Lithology
- Primary: Limestone, mudstone, sandstone, siltstone

Location
- Coordinates: 57.7°N 5.7°W
- Approximate paleocoordinates: 43.4°N 1.9°W
- Region: Hebrides
- Country: Scotland
- Broadford Beds Formation (the United Kingdom) Broadford Beds Formation (Scotland)

The Broadford Beds Formation is a Sinemurian geologic formation in western Scotland. An indeterminate partial tibia of a theropod dinosaur are among the fossils that have been recovered from the formation

== See also ==
- List of dinosaur-bearing rock formations
  - List of stratigraphic units with indeterminate dinosaur fossils
