= Sables de Glos Formation =

Geologic formation in France

Les Sables de Glos Formation
- Stratigraphic range: Jurassic
- Type: Geological formation

Location
- Country: France

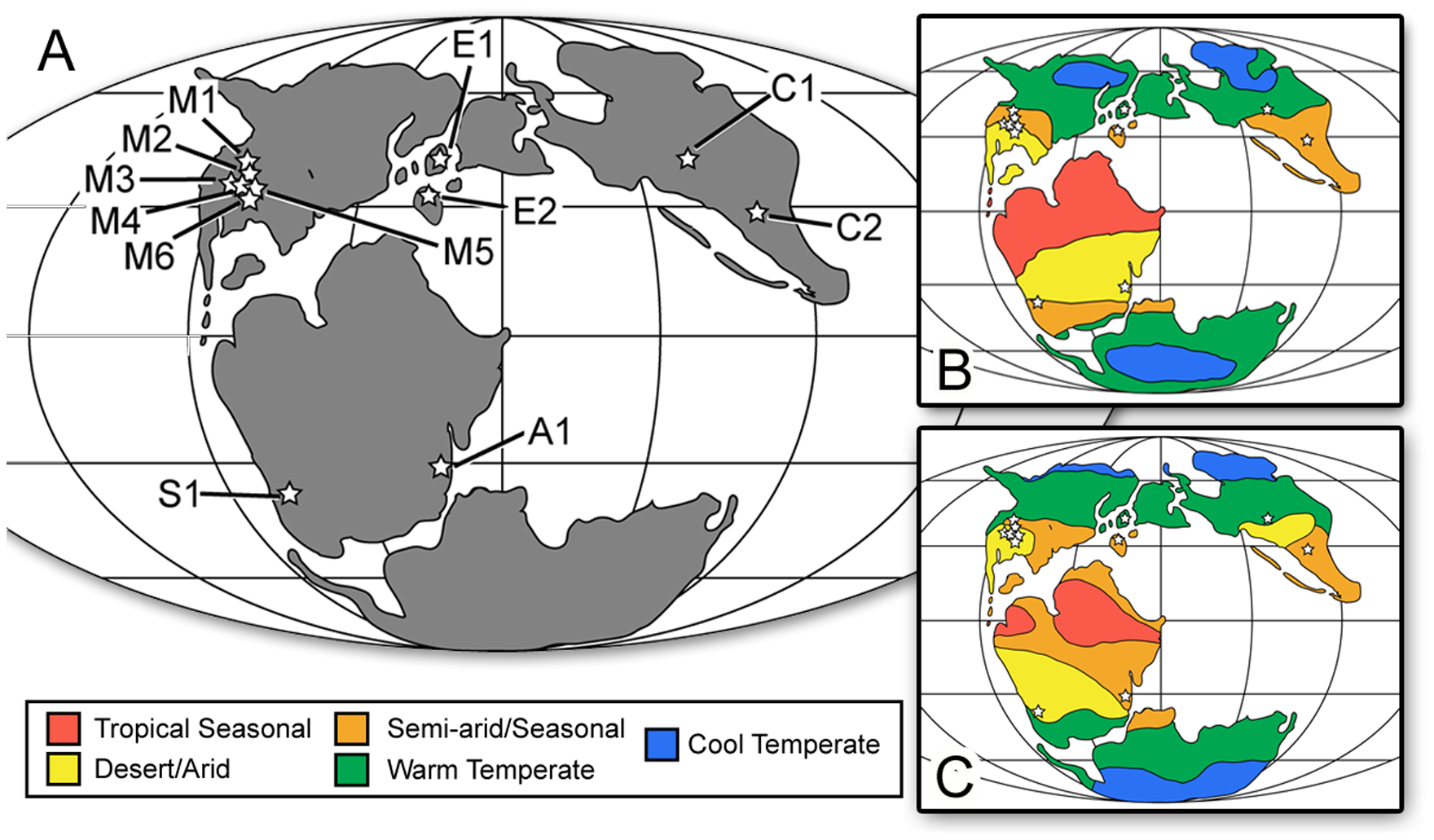
Dinosaur localities - E1: Sables de Glos Formation

The Les Sables de Glos Formation is a sandy Jurassic-age geologic formation in France. Dinosaur remains are among the fossils that have been recovered from the formation, although none have yet been referred to a specific genus.

== See also ==
- List of fossiliferous stratigraphic units in France
- List of dinosaur-bearing rock formations
  - List of stratigraphic units with indeterminate dinosaur fossils
