= Calizas de Lychnus Formation =

Geologic formation in Spain

- Stratigraphic range: Maastrichtian
- Type: Geological formation

Lithology
- Primary: Limestone
- Other: Mudstone

Location
- Coordinates: 41.9°N 3.4°W
- Approximate paleocoordinates: 34.1°N 3.0°W
- Region: Castille and Leon
- Country: Spain
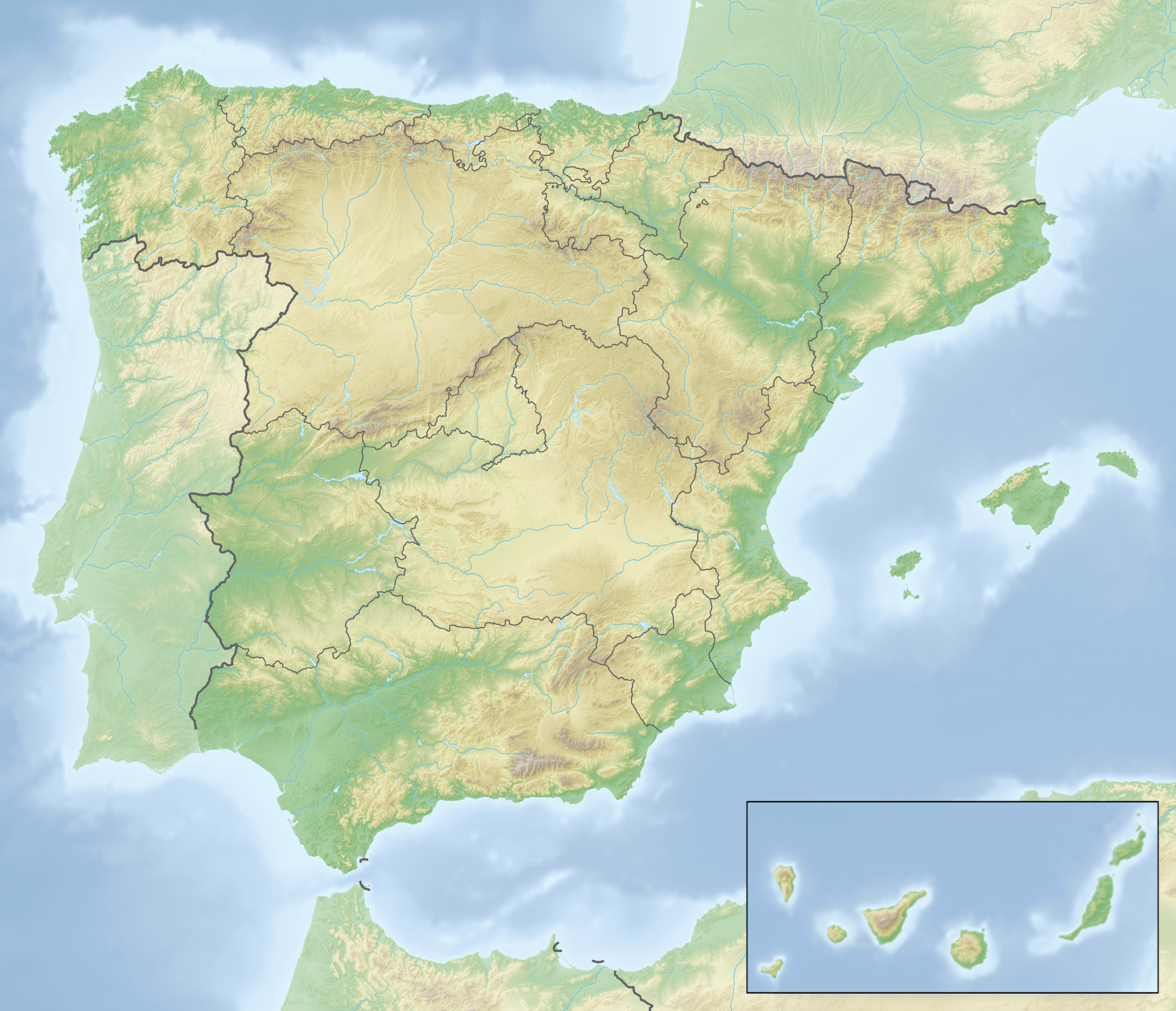
- Calizas de Lychnus Formation (Spain)

The Calizas de Lychnus Formation is a Maastrichtian geologic formation in northern central Spain. Dinosaur remains diagnostic to the genus level are among the fossils that have been recovered from the formation.

== Fossil content ==
=== Dinosaurs ===
- cf. Euronychodon sp.
- cf. Paronychodon sp. (?Troodontidae indet.)
- ?Hypselosaurus sp.
- Nodosauridae indet.
- Rhabdodontidae indet.
- Titanosauridae indet.
- Dinosauria indet.
- Sauropoda indet.
- ?Dromaeosauridae indet.

Invertebrates

- Bithynella sp.
- Physa cf. patula

Fish

- Actinopterygii indet.

Other reptiles

- Acynodon lopezi
- Crocodylia indet.
- Eusuchia indet.
- Testudines indet.

Mammals

- Labes quintanillensis
- ?Palaeoryctidae indet.

Flora

- Typha sp.
- Arecaceae indet.
- Charophyta indet.

== See also ==
- List of dinosaur-bearing rock formations
  - List of stratigraphic units with few dinosaur genera
