= Dohoin Usu Formation =

Geologic formation in Mongolia

- Stratigraphic range: Campanian; ~85–71 Ma
- Type: Geological formation

Lithology
- Primary: Gray, blue, sandy claystone and red, sandy claystone

Location
- Coordinates: 44.8°N 105.0°E
- Approximate paleocoordinates: 42.6°N 93.8°E
- Country: Mongolia

Type section
- Named for: Dohoin Usu
- Dohoin Usu Formation (Mongolia)

The Dohoin Usu Formation is a Late Cretaceous (Campanian) geologic formation in Mongolia. Dinosaur remains are among the fossils that have been recovered from the formation, although none have yet been referred to a specific genus.

== Fossil content ==
The formation has provided the following fossils:

Reptiles

- Goniopholididae indet.
- Hadrosauridae indet.
- Nanhsiungchelyidae indet.

Gastropods

- Gastropoda indet.

== See also ==
- List of dinosaur-bearing rock formations
  - List of stratigraphic units with indeterminate dinosaur fossils
