= Ladd Formation =

Geologic formation in California, United States

- Stratigraphic range: Late Cretaceous
- Type: Geological formation

Location
- Region: California
- Country: United States

The Ladd Formation is a Mesozoic geologic formation located in Orange County, California.

== Paleofauna ==
Dinosaur remains (mainly hadrosaurid fragments) are among the fossils that have been recovered from the formation, although none have yet been referred to a specific genus. In 1927 Bernard Nettleton Moore found a hadrosaur maxilla with teeth while searching for ammonites in the formation. In 1950 Marlon V. Kirk found a plesiosaur centrum (spool of the vertebra). In 1978 Robert Drachuk, also while searching for ammonites, collected a hadrosaur cranial fragment from a limestone concretion. In 1992 Robert D. Hansen found the distal tibia of a hadrosaur.

Vertebrates of the Moreno Formation
| Genus | Species | Location | Member | Abundance | Notes | Images |
|---|---|---|---|---|---|---|
| Basilemys | | | | | | |

== See also ==
- List of dinosaur-bearing rock formations
  - List of stratigraphic units with indeterminate dinosaur fossils
