= Iles Formation =

Geologic formation in Colorado and Wyoming, United States

- Stratigraphic range: Campanian
- Type: Formation

Location
- Region: Colorado, Wyoming
- Country: United States

The Iles Formation is a Mesozoic geologic formation. Dinosaur remains are among the fossils that have been recovered from the formation, although none have yet been referred to a specific genus.

== See also ==
- List of dinosaur-bearing rock formations
  - List of stratigraphic units with indeterminate dinosaur fossils
