= Sangarskaya Svita =

Geologic formation in Russia

- Stratigraphic range: Early Cretaceous (Berriasian-Hauterivian)
- Type: Geological formation

Location
- Country: Russia

The Sangarskaya Svita is an Early Cretaceous geologic formation in Russia. Dinosaur remains from the Ankylosauridae are among the fossils that have been recovered from the formation, although none have yet been referred to a specific genus.

== Paleofauna ==
- Ankylosauridae indet

== See also ==
- List of dinosaur-bearing rock formations
  - List of stratigraphic units with indeterminate dinosaur fossils
