= Bonnet Plume Formation =

Geologic formation in Yukon, Canada

- Type: Geological formation
- Thickness: at least 1500m

Location
- Region: Yukon
- Country: Canada

Type section
- Named for: Bonnet Plume River

The Bonnet Plume Formation is a Mesozoic geologic formation in Canada's Yukon territory. The thickness of the formation is known to be at least 1500 metres. The formation is composed of sedimentary rocks including conglomerate, sandstone, siltstone, mudstone and coal.

Dinosaur remains, including hadrosaurs and ornithopods, are among the fossils that have been recovered from the formation, although none have yet been referred to a specific genus.

== See also ==
- List of dinosaur-bearing rock formations
  - List of stratigraphic units with indeterminate dinosaur fossils
