= Amole Formation =

Geologic formation in Arizona

- Type: Geological formation

Location
- Region: Arizona
- Country: United States

The Amole Formation is a Mesozoic geologic formation in Arizona. Dinosaur remains are among the fossils that have been recovered from the formation, although none have yet been referred to a specific genus.

== See also ==
- Amole Arkose
- List of stratigraphic units with dinosaur body fossils
  - List of stratigraphic units with indeterminate dinosaur fossils
