= Mabdi Formation =

Geologic formation in Yemen

- Stratigraphic range: Kimmeridgian
- Type: Geological formation
- Unit of: Surdud Group
- Underlies: Tawila Sandstone
- Overlies: Amran Formation
- Thickness: 60 to 290 metres

Lithology
- Primary: Limestone, Sandstone, Shale

Location
- Country: Yemen

The Mabdi Formation is a Late Jurassic geologic formation in western Yemen. It is considered Kimmeridgian in age based on invertebrates. It is laterally equivalent to the Sabatain Formation. It consists of limestone, sandstone and shale deposited in a nearshore shallow marine setting during widespread marine transgression on the Arabian Shelf. Remains of vertebrates, including Dinosaurs have been recovered from the formation. These include the remains of an indeterminate sauropod as well as those of hybodont sharks, pycnodont fish, turtles, and crocodilians. The sauropod was found in hard calcite cemented sandstone, not all of the bones of the individual were collected, with many remaining at the locality pending further excavation

== See also ==
- List of dinosaur-bearing rock formations
  - List of stratigraphic units with indeterminate dinosaur fossils
