= Qagannur Formation =

Mesozoic geologic formation in China

- Stratigraphic range: Early Cretaceous
- Type: Geological formation

Location
- Country: China

The Qagannur Formation is a Mesozoic geologic formation in China. Dinosaur remains are among the fossils that have been recovered from the formation, although none have yet been referred to a specific genus. The informal sauropod "Nurosaurus" is known from this formation.

== Paleofauna ==
- "Nurosaurus qaganensis" - "partial skeleton"
- Stegosauria indet. - "plates and scapula"

== See also ==
- List of dinosaur-bearing rock formations
- List of stratigraphic units with indeterminate dinosaur fossils
