= Unit S3U1 =

Geological formation

- Stratigraphic range: Late Cretaceous
- Type: Geological formation

Location
- Region: Burgos
- Country: Spain

The Unit S3U1 is a geological formation in Burgos, Spain whose strata date back to the Late Cretaceous. Dinosaur remains are among the fossils that have been recovered from the formation.

== See also ==
- List of dinosaur-bearing rock formations
