= Douiret Formation =

Geologic formation in Tunisia

- Stratigraphic range: Hauterivian-Aptian; ~129–115 Ma
- Type: Geological formation
- Unit of: Merbah el Asfer Group
- Underlies: Chenini Formation
- Overlies: Boulouha Formation

Lithology
- Primary: Sandstone, claystone

Location
- Coordinates: 32.7°N 10.2°E
- Approximate paleocoordinates: 17.8°N 11.9°E
- Region: Tatouine
- Country: Tunisia
- Douiret Formation (Tunisia)

The Douiret Formation is a geologic formation in Tunisia, near the Berber village of Douiret. It is part of the larger Continental Intercalaire Formation, which stretches from Algeria and Niger in the west to Egypt and Sudan in the east. The Douiret Formation is located in the Tataouine basin in southern Tunisia, stretching into Algeria and Libya, and is part of the Merbah el Asfer Group of rock formations. The Douiret is 80 metres thick and consists of a 30-metre layer of sand beneath a 50-metre layer of clay.

A few fossil-bearing beds have been discovered in the sand layer. The fossils range from the Aptian to Albian period and include freshwater and marginal marine sharks, skates, fish, turtles, crocodilians, pterosaurs, bivalves, pollens and plants, including trees. The fish are the most abundant type of fossil found. The orientation of the fossils suggests the earlier ones were deposited by a westward flowing paleocurrent while the later ones were laid down in waves. Dinosaur remains consisting of the remains of a single indeterminate iguanodontid ornithopod are also among the fossils that have been recovered from the formation, although none have yet been referred to a specific genus.

The green clay layer contains plant remains (ferns and conifers), but no vertebrate or flowering plant remains.

The Douiret formation dates from the Early Cretaceous period, more than 100 million years ago. Scientists have dated the sandy layer to the Hauterivian, Barremian or Aptian periods (132 to 113 million years ago) and the clay layer to the Barremian or Aptian periods (130 to 113 million years ago).

Based on both the geology of the formation and the fossils found, scientists agree that the sandy part of the Douiret Formation was a lush coast or more likely river delta on the shore of the Tethys Sea, but by the time of the clay layer, tectonic subsidence and the northward migration of the Tethys Sea had turned the area into a huge freshwater lagoon that periodically dried into a salt flat, hostile to vegetation.

== See also ==
- List of dinosaur-bearing rock formations
  - List of stratigraphic units with indeterminate dinosaur fossils
