= Dobrotivá Formation =

Geologic formation in the Czech Republic

Coordinates: 50°5′13″N 14°19′53″E

The Dobrotivá Formation (Czech: dobrotivské souvrství) is a fossil formation situated in Prague-Liboc in the Czech Republic. The Dobrotivá Formation contains many valuable trilobites.
