= Grozonodon =

Grozonodon Temporal range: Norian–Rhaetian

Scientific classification
- Kingdom: Animalia
- Phylum: Chordata
- Class: Chondrichthyes
- Subclass: Elasmobranchii
- Genus: Grozonodon
- Species: G. candaui

Binomial name
- Grozonodon candaui Cuny et al., 1998

Extinct genus of neoselachian

Grozonodon is an extinct monotypic genus of elasmobranchian that lived during the Norian and Rhaetian stages of the Late Triassic epoch.

== Etymology ==
The generic name Grozonodon is derived from the name of the type locality Grozon, where the holotype of the genus was found, and the Greek word -odon, meaning tooth. The specific epithet of the type species, Grozonodon candaui, honours Marianne Candau, who volunteered for five years for palaeontological work in the Jura area where the fossil was found.

== Distribution ==
Fossils of G. candaui are known from Germany and from France.
