= Khooldzin Svita =

Geological formation

- Stratigraphic range: Early Cretaceous
- Type: Geological formation

Location
- Region: Asia
- Country: Mongolia

The Khooldzin Svita is a geological formation in Mongolia whose strata date back to the Early Cretaceous. Dinosaur remains are among the fossils that have been recovered from the formation.

== See also ==
- List of dinosaur-bearing rock formations
