= Hantong Formation =

Geological formation

- Stratigraphic range: Late Jurassic
- Type: Geological formation

Location
- Country: China

The Hantong Formation is a geological formation in Asia whose strata date back to the Late Jurassic. Dinosaur remains are among the fossils that have been recovered from the formation.

== Vertebrate paleofauna ==
Genus	Species	Presence	Notes	Images
?Mamenchisaurus	?M. constructus	1. Geographically located in Sichuan, China.	Referral to M. constructus provisional absent revision of Mamenchisaurus.	Mamenchisaurus

== See also ==
- List of dinosaur-bearing rock formations
