= Argiles à Plicatules =

Geological formation in France

- Stratigraphic range: Aptian
- Type: Geological formation

Location
- Region: Europe
- Country: France

The Argiles à Plicatules (French for: "clay with Plicatula") is a geological formation in northern central France whose strata date back to the Early Cretaceous. Dinosaur remains are among the fossils that have been recovered from the formation.

== Fossil content ==
Color key: Taxon / Reclassified taxon / Taxon falsely reported as present / Dubious taxon or junior synonym / Ichnotaxon / Ootaxon / Morphotaxon	Notes; Uncertain or tentative taxa are in small text; ~~crossed out~~ taxa are discredited.

=== Dinosaurs ===
==== Ornithischians ====
Ornithischians of the Argiles à Plicatules
Genus	Species	Location	Stratigraphic position	Material	Notes	Images
Iguanodon	I. bernissartensis		Aptian		A iguanodontid ornithopod	
Mantellisaurus	M. atherfieldensis		Aptian		A hadrosauriform styracosternan	

== See also ==
- List of dinosaur-bearing rock formations
