= Ryugase Group =

Geologic formation in Russia

- Stratigraphic range: Late Santonian- Early Campanian; ~85–72 Ma
- Type: Geological formation
- Overlies: Yezo Group

Lithology
- Primary: Mudstone

Location
- Coordinates: 47.2°N 142.5°E
- Approximate paleocoordinates: 51.9°N 130.0°E
- Region: Sakhalin Oblast
- Country: Russia
- Extent: Sakhalin Island
- Ryugase Group (Russia)

The Ryugase Group is a geological formation on Sakhalin Island in far eastern Russia whose strata date back to the Late Cretaceous.

== Vertebrate paleofauna ==
- Nipponosaurus sachalinensis - "Partial skull and associated postcrania, juvenile." Probably actually from the Yezo Group.

== See also ==
- List of dinosaur-bearing rock formations
- List of fossiliferous stratigraphic units in Russia
