= Shestakovskaya Svita =

Geological formation in Mongolia

- Stratigraphic range: Early Cretaceous
- Type: Geological formation

Location
- Region: Asia
- Country: Mongolia, Russia

The Shestakovskaya Svita is a geological formation in Mongolia and eastern Russia whose strata date back to the Early Cretaceous. Dinosaur remains are among the fossils that have been recovered from the formation.

== Vertebrate paleofauna ==
- ?Tyrannosauridae indet.
- Troodontidae indet.
- Dromaeosauridae indet.
- Titanosauria indet.
- Avialae indet.
- Psittacosaurus mongoliensis
- Psittacosaurus cf xinjiangensis
- Psittacosaurus sibiricus

== See also ==
- List of dinosaur-bearing rock formations
