= Cimarron Ridge =

Mountain ridge in Colorado, United States

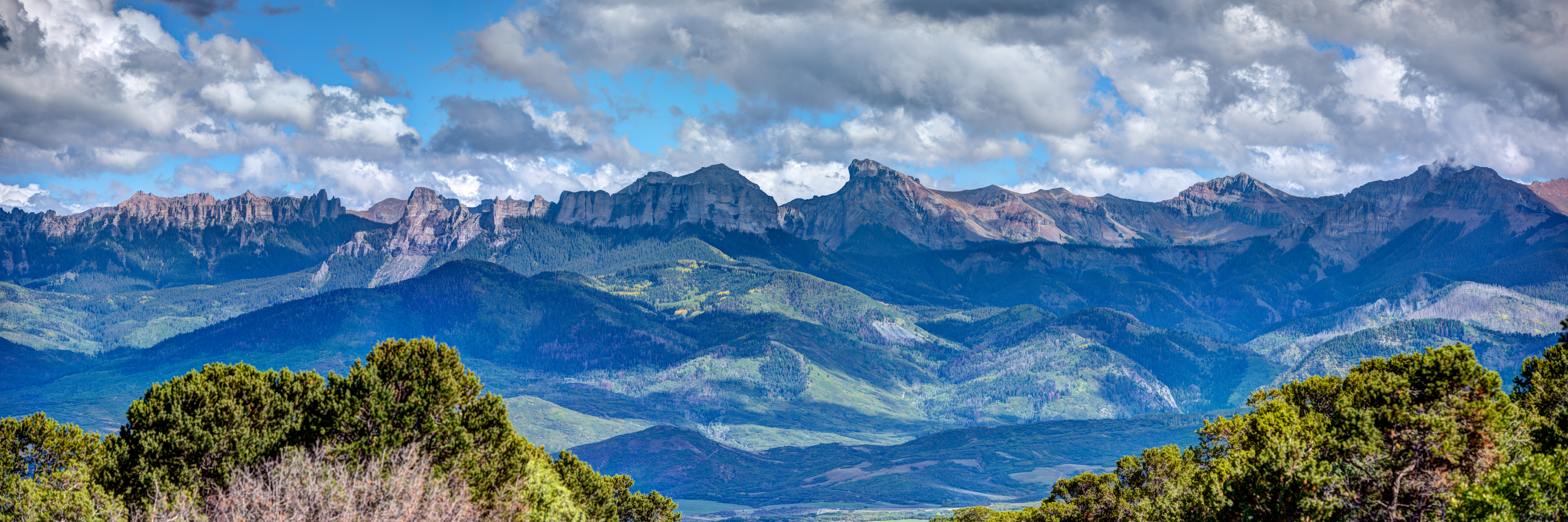
- Part of the ridge as viewed from the west

Highest point
- Elevation: 12,172 ft (3,710 m)
- Coordinates: 38°12′36″N 107°34′32″W

Geography
- Location within Colorado
- Location: Southwestern Colorado
- Parent range: San Juan Mountains
- Topo map(s): USGS Courthouse Mountain; Washboard Rock; Buckhorn Lakes

Geology
- Mountain type: Ridge

Cimarron Ridge is a ridge in the San Juan Mountains in southwestern Colorado. The ridge runs north-south and occupies parts of Gunnison, Montrose, Ouray, and Hinsdale counties. The ridge parallels U.S. Highway 550, and parts of the ridge can be seen from points along the highway.

== Prominent peaks ==
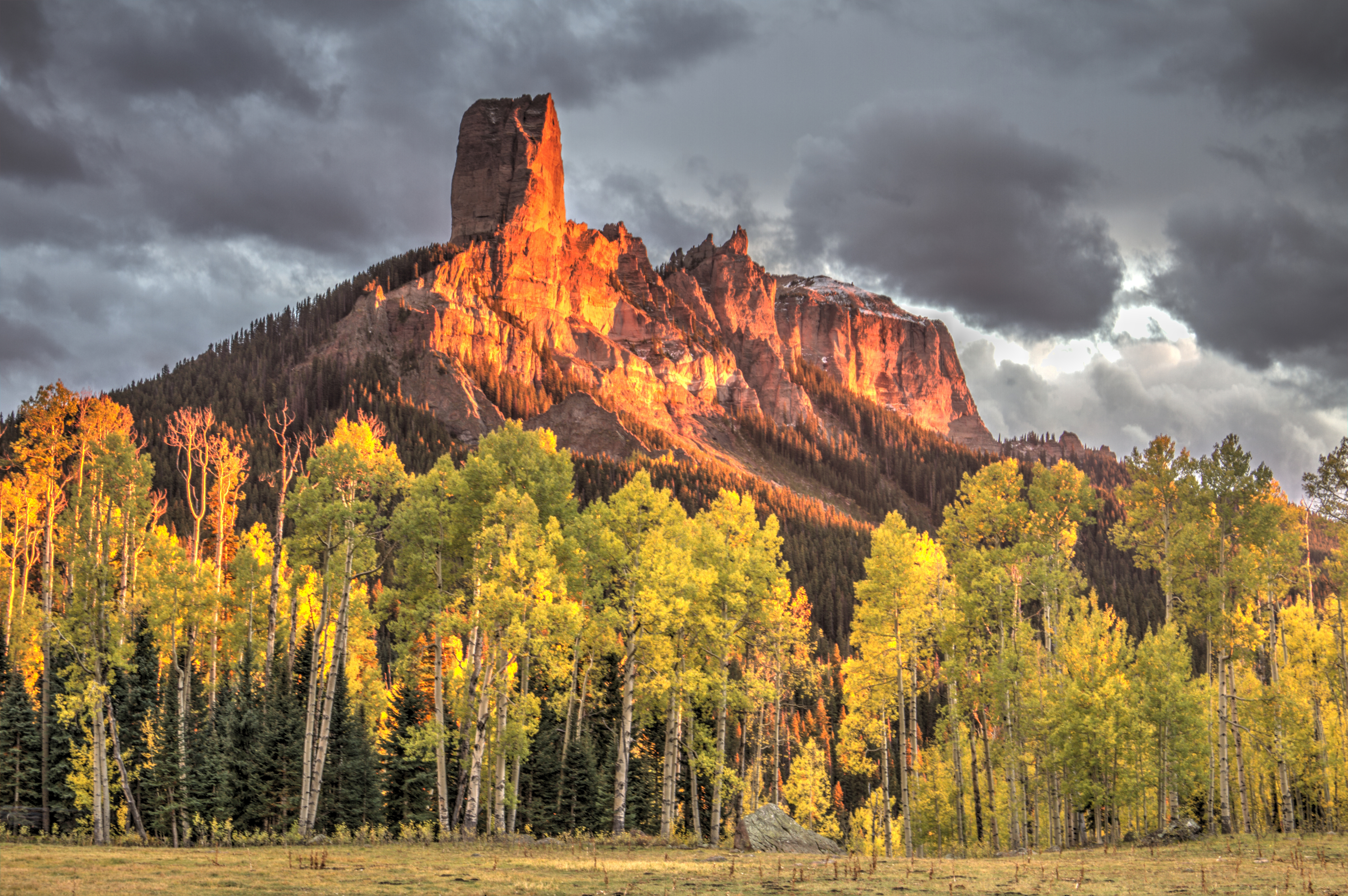
Sunset at Chimney Rock, Colorado, in autumn

Peaks along the ridge include Courthouse Mountain, elevation 12,172 ft (3,710 m), and Chimney Rock, elevation 10,958 ft (3,340 m). Chimney Rock is known for appearing in the 1969 western motion picture True Grit and is considered among the most difficult peaks to climb in Colorado.

== Geology ==
The ridge is made up of green and gray tuff breccia and is the "erosional remains of a larger volcanic pile that surrounded several volcanoes." The Cimarron Ridge Formation takes its name from the ridge.
