= Kecskehát Limestone =

Geologic formation in Hungary

- Stratigraphic range: Pliensbachian; ~184 Ma
- Type: Geological formation
- Unit of: Tisza Unit
- Overlies: Mecsek Coal Formation

Lithology
- Primary: Modified grain flow sediment; coarse-grained crinoidal limestone
- Other: Sandstone

Location
- Region: Kecskemét
- Country: Hungary

Type section
- Named for: Kecskehát caves

The Kecskehát Limestone is a Jurassic geologic formation in Hungary. Indeterminate fossil Sauropod tracks have been reported from the formation. It is abundant on Illite and very little Kaolinite that indicates a change from the humid-subtropical climate of the Mecsek Coal Formation to the monsoon-like semi-arid climate of the Pliensbachian formations. The dominance of illite indicates a relatively fast erosion of the source area and a moderate input of terrigenous clastics relative to the underlying formations.

== Vertebrate paleofauna ==
=== Dinosaurs ===
Indeterminate sauropod remains once misattributed to the Cetiosauridae are present in the province of Kecskemét, Hungary.

Dinosaurs of the Kecskehát Limestone
Genus	Species	Location	Stratigraphic position	Material	Notes	Images
Mamenchisauridae	Indeterminate new species			Skull; Vertebrae; Femur; Tibia; Isolated teeth	An indeterminate sauropod related to the Mamenchisauridae, with a similar build to Omeisaurus	

Color key: Taxon / Reclassified taxon / Taxon falsely reported as present / Dubious taxon or junior synonym / Ichnotaxon / Ootaxon / Morphotaxon	Notes; Uncertain or tentative taxa are in small text; ~~crossed out~~ taxa are discredited.

== See also ==
- List of dinosaur-bearing rock formations
  - List of stratigraphic units with sauropodomorph tracks
    - Indeterminate sauropodomorph tracks
