= Normanniasaurus =

Normanniasaurus Temporal range: Early Cretaceous, 113–107 Ma

Scientific classification
- Domain: Eukaryota
- Kingdom: Animalia
- Phylum: Chordata
- Clade: Dinosauria
- Clade: Saurischia
- Clade: †Sauropodomorpha
- Clade: †Sauropoda
- Clade: †Macronaria
- Clade: †Titanosauria
- Genus: †Normanniasaurus; Le Loeuff, Suteethorn & Buffetaut, 2013

Type species
- †Normanniasaurus genceyi Le Loeuff, Suteethorn & Buffetaut, 2013

Extinct genus of reptiles

Normanniasaurus (/nɔːrˈmæniəˌsɔːrəs/ Normannia lizard) is an extinct genus of basal titanosaur sauropod known from the Early Cretaceous (Albian stage) Poudingue Ferrugineux of Seine-Maritime, northwestern France.

== Discovery and naming ==
Normanniasaurus was first described and named by Jean Le Loeuff, Suravech Suteethorn and Eric Buffetaut in 2013 and the type species is Normanniasaurus genceyi. The generic name is derived from Normannia, the Latin name of Normandy where the bones were discovered, and from sauros, meaning "lizard" in Ancient Greek. The specific name, genceyi, honors Mr. Pierre Gencey who discovered the remains in July 1990. Normanniasaurus is known from the holotype MHNH-2013.2.1.1 through MHNH-2013.2.1.12 housed at the Museum d’histoire naturelle du Havre, a partial skeleton including presacral vertebrae fragments, a partial sacrum, an anterior and a middle caudal vertebrae, a right scapula, fragments of both ilia and ischia, the proximal end of a femur and the proximal part of a fibula. A posterior caudal centrum, housed at the Muséum d’Histoire Naturelle de Rouen, discovered at the end of the nineteenth century and described by Buffetaut in 1984, was also referred to this species. All specimens were collected on the north side of Cap de la Hève at Bléville, Le Havre, dating to the early to middle Albian stage of the Early Cretaceous period, although the referred specimen is apparently from a younger level of the Albian.

== Description ==
Normanniasaurus is known from vertebrae and parts of the axial skeleton. It can be distinguished from other Albian sauropods of Western Europe.

=== Distinguishing characteristics ===
Below is a list of autapomorphies found by Le Loeuff et al. when evaluating the holotype of Normanniasaurus:

- presacral vertebrae with a hyposphene-hypantrum attachment;
- a cancellous internal texture of presacral vertebrae;
- deeply procoelous anterior caudal vertebrae, with antepostzygapophysial foramen, deep post- and prespinal fossae, and an axially elongated neural spine;
- amphicoelous middle caudal vertebrae, with a neural arch attached cranially;
- a dorsal projection of the spinoprezygapophysial lamina in the mid-caudals;
- and an ilium with a blade craniolaterally expanded.

== Classification ==
Normanniasaurus is a basal titanosaurian. It shares several primitive characters with slightly younger basal titanosaurians such as Epachthosaurus and Andesaurus.

== Biogeography ==
The late Early Cretaceous radiation of basal Titanosauria in South America, Europe and Africa is unusual.

In Europe, Albian sauropods are still poorly known. Isolated discoveries (from Cambridgeshire, northern France, and southern France) indicate that European titanosaurs coexisted in the Albian with other groups of sauropods.
