= Eagle Sandstone =

Geological formation in Montana, USA

- Stratigraphic range: Late Cretaceous
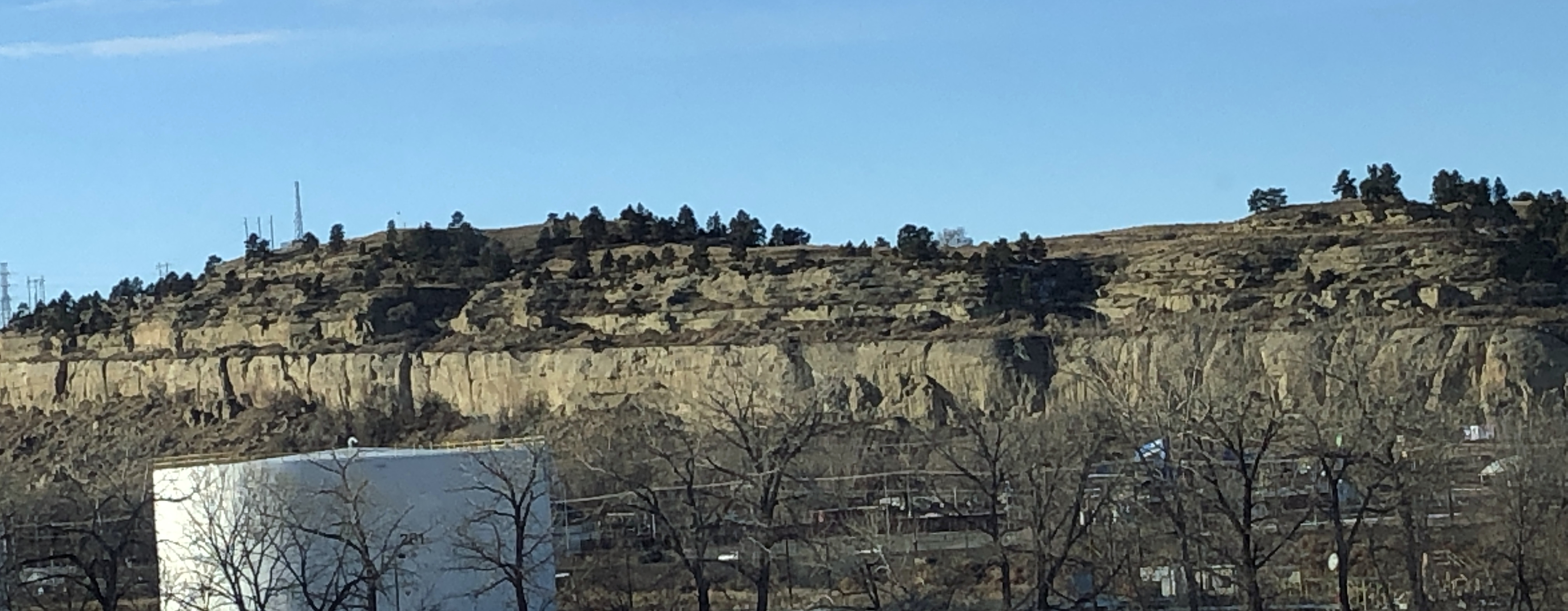
- Eagle Sandstone above Billings, MT
- Type: Geological formation
- Underlies: Claggett Shale, Judith River Formation
- Overlies: Telegraph Creek Formation, Niobrara Shale
- Thickness: 100 to 350 feet

Lithology
- Primary: Sandstone
- Other: Sandy shale

Location
- Region: Montana

The Eagle Sandstone, originally the Eagle Formation, is a geological formation in Montana whose strata date back to the Late Cretaceous. It is a light to brownish gray to pale yellow-orange, fine-grained sandstone. It contains areas of crossbedding and local shale members. It contains large (up to 15 feet in diameter) sandy calcareous concretions. Its thickness varies from 100 to 350 feet due to the lens nature of the individual sandstone layers and local interbedded sandy shale layers.

Dinosaur fossils have been recovered from the formation.

Weathering and erosion of the formation has created natural arches, hoodoos and other picturesque features of the Upper Missouri River Breaks National Monument.

== Vertebrate paleofauna ==
- "Ornithomimus" grandis - Pes.

== See also ==
- List of dinosaur-bearing rock formations
- List of fossiliferous stratigraphic units in Montana
- Paleontology in Montana

== Bibliography ==
- Various Contributors to the Paleobiology Database. "Fossilworks: Gateway to the Paleobiology Database". Archived from the original on 19 August 2022.
