= Poudingue Ferrugineux =

Geological formation in France

- Stratigraphic range: Lower to mid Albian
- Type: Formation
- Underlies: Argiles du Gault
- Overlies: Argiles à Bucaillella
- Thickness: Less than 5 metres

Lithology
- Primary: Conglomerate

Location
- Country: France

The Poudingue Ferrugineux is a geologic formation in France. It preserves fossils dating back to the Albian stage of the Cretaceous period. It predominantly consists of conglomerate, deposited in shallow marine conditions. It is exposed at Cap de la Hève at Le Havre, Normandy. The dinosaur Normanniasaurus is known from the formation.

== See also ==
- List of fossiliferous stratigraphic units in France
