= Telegraph Creek Formation =

Geologic formation in Montana, United States

- Stratigraphic range: Santonian
- Type: Geological formation

Location
- Region: Montana
- Country: United States

The Telegraph Creek Formation is a Mesozoic geologic formation in Montana, United States. Dinosaur remains are among the fossils that have been recovered from the formation, although none have yet been referred to a specific genus.

== Fossil content ==
Color key: Taxon / Reclassified taxon / Taxon falsely reported as present / Dubious taxon or junior synonym / Ichnotaxon / Ootaxon / Morphotaxon	Notes; Uncertain or tentative taxa are in small text; ~~crossed out~~ taxa are discredited.

=== Invertebrates ===
Invertebrates reported from the Telegraph Creek Formation
Genus	Species	Locality	Stratigraphic member	Material	Notes	Images
Sphenoceramus	S.cardissoides; S.lundbreckensis					
Desmoscaphites	D.bassleri					

=== Vertebrates ===
Vertebrates reported from the Telegraph Creek Formation
Genus	Species	Locality	Stratigraphic member	Material	Notes	Images
Tylosaurus	T.proriger			Skull		
Hadrosauridae	indet					

== See also ==
- List of dinosaur-bearing rock formations
  - List of stratigraphic units with indeterminate dinosaur fossils
