= Pachyacanthus =

Pachyacanthus Temporal range: Miocene-Pliocene, 15.97–2.588 Ma

Scientific classification
- Domain: Eukaryota
- Kingdom: Animalia
- Phylum: Chordata
- Class: Mammalia
- Order: Artiodactyla
- Infraorder: Cetacea
- Family: Platanistidae
- Genus: †Pachyacanthus; Brandt, 1871
- Species: †P. suessi

Binomial name
- †Pachyacanthus suessi Brandt, 1871

Extinct genus of whales

Pachyacanthus is an extinct genus of toothed whale that lived about 15.97 to 2.589 million years ago (Miocene and Pliocene). It contains the single species Pachyacanthus suessi. The genus is known from European deposits in Hungary, Kazakhstan, Austria and Italy. The type specimen consisted of a few fragments of a rostrum and two fragmentary tympanic bullae. Skeletons from the Sarmatian (Middle Miocene) of Austria did not include skulls.

== Morphology ==
The genus is related to modern South Asian river dolphin and is distinguished by pachyostosis in the spinous processes of the postcervical vertebrae.

== Paleoecology ==
The locations of discovery are thought to have corresponded to well-oxygenated, shallow water sustaining seagrasses similar to today's Mediterranean neptune grass.
