= Glauconie argileuse =

Geological formation in Belgium

- Stratigraphic range: Santonian
- Type: Geological formation

Location
- Region: Europe
- Country: Belgium

The Glauconie argileuse is a geological formation in Europe whose strata date back to the Late Cretaceous. Dinosaur remains are among the fossils that have been recovered from the formation.

== Vertebrate paleofauna ==
Dinosaurs of the Glauconie argileuse
Genus	Species	Presence	Notes	Images
Craspedodon	C. lonzeensis	Geographically present in Province de Namur, Belgium.	"[Three] teeth."	
Megalosaurus	M. lonzeensis	Geographically present in Province de Namur, Belgium.	Remains now considered to be an indeterminate theropod. - "Pedal ungual."	

== See also ==
- List of dinosaur-bearing rock formations
