= Mecsek Coal Formation =

Geologic formation in Hungary

- Stratigraphic range: Hettangian-Pliensbachian; ~201–183 Ma
- Type: Geological formation
- Unit of: Tisza Unit
- Underlies: Kecskehát Limestone

Lithology
- Primary: Siltstone
- Other: Coal

Location
- Coordinates: 46.1°N 18.2°E
- Approximate paleocoordinates: 27.6°N 21.6°E
- Region: Baranya, Transdanubia
- Country: Hungary

Type section
- Named for: Mecsek Mountains
- Mecsek Coal Formation (Hungary)

The Mecsek Coal Formation is a Jurassic geologic formation in Hungary. Indeterminate fossil ornithischian tracks have been reported from the formation.

== Vertebrate paleofauna ==
=== Dinosaurs ===
Indeterminate sauropod remains once misattributed to the Cetiosauridae are present in the province of Komló, Hungary.

Dinosaurs
| Genus | Species | Location | Stratigraphic position | Material | Notes | Images |
|---|---|---|---|---|---|---|
| Anchisauripus | A. tuberosus | Pécsbánya coal mine, seam 22 | | Ichnofossils | An eubrontid | |
| Kayentapus | K. soltykovensis | Pécs-Vasas II mine | | Ichnofossils | | |
| Komlosaurus | K. carbonis | Kómlo | | Teeth; Vertebrae; Related footprints | A theropod | |
| Heterodontosauridae | Indeterminate | Kómlo | | Partial frontal skeleton | A neornithischian | |
| Theropoda | Indeterminate | | | Footprints; Isolated teeth | An indeterminate theropod | |

| Color key: Taxon / Reclassified taxon / Taxon falsely reported as present / Dubious taxon or junior synonym / Ichnotaxon / Ootaxon / Morphotaxon | Notes; Uncertain or tentative taxa are in small text; ~~crossed out~~ taxa are discredited. |

== See also ==
- List of dinosaur-bearing rock formations
  - List of stratigraphic units with ornithischian tracks
    - Indeterminate ornithischian tracks
