= Geology of Tunisia =

The geology of Tunisia is defined by the tectonics of North Africa, with large highlands like the Atlas Mountains as well as basins such as the Tunisian Trough. Geologists have identified rock units in the country as much as a quarter-billion years old, although most units date to the Mesozoic and Cenozoic, in the past 250 million years. Tunisia has a small but active mining industry and a significant oil and natural gas sector.

== Structural geology and tectonics ==
The Tunisian Atlas mountains are a fold and thrust belt between the Rifo-Tellian chain, in the northwest (a part of the Alpine chain) and the Saharan platform in southern Tunisia. The Rifo-Tellian chain is separated from the Atlas Mountains in northern Tunisia by the Tunisian Trough. Sedimentary units in the Tunisian Atlas mountains are divided by three regional faults: the Kasserine Fault, Gafsa Fault and Kaala-Djerda-Sbiba Fault.

== Stratigraphy and geologic history ==
The oldest strata in Tunisia date to the Permian and are located beneath the Jeffara in Jebel Tebaga, in southeastern Tunisia. They are claystone and sandstone, interbedded with limestone containing foraminifera, corals and brachiopod fossils.

=== Mesozoic (251-66 million years ago) ===
The Triassic period is well preserved and known from outcrops in southern Tunisia and oil well drilling. The lower Triassic is defined by argillite and sandy fluvial, river sequences, overlain by a carbonate unit with palynomorphs indicating a Ladinian, Middle Triassic age. The Upper Triassic is marked by the Messaoudi dolomite, evidence of marine transgression. Lower and Middle Jurassic units are mainly calcareous and marl sediments, although some from the Late Jurassic preserve a deep ocean environment with the fossils of radiolarians.

Southwest of Jebel Zaghouan, Jurassic strata are for the most part limestones, while to the north and south dolomite sequences shift into Late Cretaceous argillites. Paleosols and beds rich in plant fossils are common in Cretaceous units, which are also well preserved along with the Triassic.

Several thousand meters of clay from the Cretaceous fill the Tunisian Trough, laden with ammonite fossils and calpionellids, an extinct species of single celled organisms, as well as sand and calcareous deposits. In central Tunisia, the Meloussi Formation is made up of marine sandstone and carbonates. The Boudinar Formation comprises fluvial sandstones with poor sorting and the Gafsa Group contains clay, sand and carbonation sequences.

As in other places in Africa, southern Tunisia's Early Cretaceous rocks are part of the Continental Intercalation—which sometimes hold dinosaur bones. Other Cretaceous units include the Zebbaq Formation, with argillite and gypsum units, the Aleg Formation, with clay, marl and limestone, the El Haria Formation and Metlaoui Formation.

=== Cenozoic (66 million years ago-present) ===
The Souar Formation dates to the end of the Eocene and is made up of marine clay, marl, sand and gypsum. The Fortuna Formation in the Cap Bon area records the Oligocene with sandy limestone and marls, overlain by coarse sandstones and quartz pebbles, although it fades out in southern Tunisia. Other Cenozoic units include the Ain Grab Group and Oum Domil Formation.

Quaternary stratigraphy, from the last 2.5 million years, includes quartz sands, rich in bivalves, as well as oolitic sands.

== Natural resource geology ==
Mining is not a significant industry in Tunisia. The country has a modest amount of phosphate mining and fertilizer production, along with aluminum fluoride, cement and gypsum. The state-owned Compagnie des Phosphates de Gafsa (CPG) runs all phosphate mining and processing for Tunisia, out of eight open-pit mines near Sehib and Gafsa. Bougrine and Faj-Lahdoum (فج الهدوم) in northwestern Tunisia both have mining for lead and zinc.

Oil and gas production is the main form of extraction in Tunisia, although proven reserves continue to decline. Most gas is sourced from the El Borma field offshore. Ezzaiua gas field is located off the coast of the tourist area of Djerba Island while the Abiod Formation contains the Maamoura oil field in the Gulf of Hammamet.
