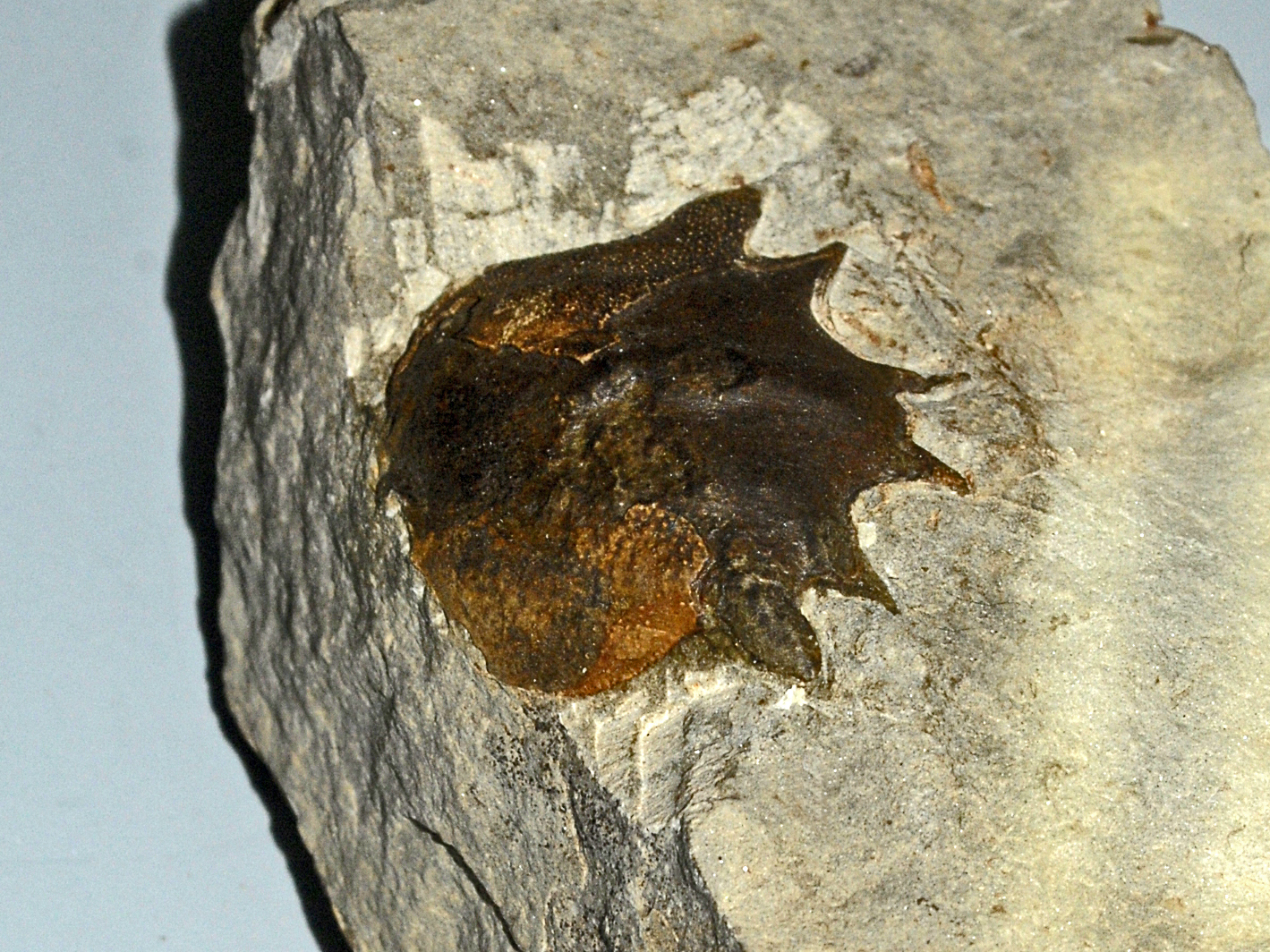
- Oligocenic fossil of Calappilia mainii

Scientific classification
- Kingdom: Animalia
- Phylum: Arthropoda
- Class: Malacostraca
- Order: Decapoda
- Suborder: Pleocyemata
- Infraorder: Brachyura
- Family: Calappidae
- Genus: †Calappilia; A. Milne-Edwards, 1873

= Calappilia =

Calappilia Temporal range: Paleogene-Mid Miocene ~55.8–15.97 Ma

Extinct genus of crabs

Calappilia is an extinct genus of box crabs belonging to the family Calappidae. The type species of the genus is Calappilia verrucosa.

Fossils of crabs within this genus have been found in Italy, United States, Mexico, Chile, and Brazil from Paleogene to Miocene (age range: 55.8 to 15.97 Ma).

== Species ==
Species within this genus include:

- Calappilia bohmi Glaessner 1929
- Calappilia bonairensis Van Straelen 1933
- Calappilia borneoensis Van Straelen 1924
- Calappilia brooksi Ross & Scolaro 1964
- Calappilia calculosa Rumsey, Klompmaker & Portell 2016
- Calappilia chilensis Feldmann et al. 2005
- Calappilia circularis Beurlen 1958
- Calappilia dacica Bittner 1893
- Calappilia diglypta Stenzel 1934
- Calappilia gemmata Beschin 1994
- Calappilia gorodiskii Remy 1959
- Calappilia hondoensis Rathbun 1930
- Calappilia incisa Bittner 1886
- Calappilia mainii Allasinaz 1987 (reassigned by some authors to Stenodromia)
- Calappilia matzkei Bachmayer 1962
- Calappilia maxwelli Feldmann 1993
- Calappilia ocalanus Ross 1964
- Calappilia perlata Noetling 1885
- Calappilia scopuli Quayle and Collins 1981
- Calappilia sexdentata Milne-Edwards 1876
- Calappilia sitzi Blow & Manning 1996
- Calappilia subovata Beschin 2002
- Calappilia tridentata Beurlen 1939
- Calappilia verrucosa Milne-Edwards 1873
- Calappilia vicetina Fabiani 1910

== Distribution ==
Fossils of Calappilia have been found in:

Paleogene

- Bateque, San Juan and Tepetate Formations, Mexico
- Cava Main di Arzignano, Italy
- Vincentown Formation, New Jersey
- Castle Hayne Limestone, North Carolina
- Stone City Formation, Texas
- Barton Beds, United Kingdom

Miocene

- Pirabas Formation, Brazil
- Navidad Formation, Chile
