= List of fossiliferous stratigraphic units in Mexico =

This is a list of stratigraphic units (groups, formations and members), containing fossils and pertaining to the North American country of Mexico.

== List ==
Group or Formation	Period
Abanico Brisa Mar Formation	Neogene
Adjuntas Formation	Paleogene
Agua Nueva Formation	Cretaceous
Agueguexquite Formation	Neogene
Aguililla Sandstone	Cretaceous
Aguja Formation	Cretaceous
Aguja Group/Javelina Formation	Cretaceous
Alazán Formation	Paleogene
Albertella Formation	Cambrian
Alisitos Formation	Cretaceous
Almejas Formation	Neogene
Angostura Formation	Cretaceous
Anidanthus zone Formation	Permian
Antimonio Formation	Jurassic, Triassic, Permian
Atotonilco El Grande Formation	Neogene
Aurora Limestone	Cretaceous
Austin Formation	Cretaceous
Balumtum Sandstone	Neogene
Barranca Group/Santa Clara Formation	Triassic
Barril Viejo Formation	Cretaceous
Bateque Formation	Paleogene
Benevides Formation	Cretaceous
Bisbee Formation	Cretaceous
Bisbee Group/Cerro de Oro Formation	Cretaceous
Bisbee Group/Mural Limestone	Cretaceous
Bisbee Group/Nogal Formation	Cretaceous
Boca Roja Formation	Cretaceous
Bonnia Formation	Cambrian
Boquillas Formation	Cretaceous
Buda Limestone	Cretaceous
Buelna Formation	Cambrian
Cabonera Formation	Cretaceous
Cabullona Group/Corral de Enmedio Formation	Cretaceous
Cabullona Group/Lomas Coloradas Formation	Cretaceous
Cañón de Caballeros Formation	Silurian
Cantaure Formation	Neogene
Carbonera Formation	Cretaceous
Cárdenas Formation	Cretaceous
Carrillo Puerto Formation	Neogene
Cerro del Pueblo Formation	Cretaceous
Chapala shorelake Beds Formation	Mexico
Chinameca Formation	Jurassic
Chuta Formation	Cretaceous
Cipiapa Formation	Cretaceous
Claiborne Group/Carrizo Sand Formation	Paleogene
Claiborne Group/Laredo Formation	Paleogene
Claiborne Group/Mount Selman Formation	Paleogene
Claiborne Group/Yegua Formation	Paleogene
Clansayes Formation	Cretaceous
Clemente Formation	Ediacaran
Coahuila Formation	Cretaceous
Coatepec Sandstone	Jurassic
Coatzacoalcos Formation	Neogene
Colina Formation	Permian
Concepción Formation	Neogene
Cualac Conglomerate	Jurassic
Cook Mountain Formation	Paleogene
Cuesta del Carbonera Formation	Cretaceous
Cumburindio Formation	Cretaceous
Cúpido Formation	Cretaceous
Cutzamala Formation	Cretaceous
Del Río Formation	Cretaceous
Del Río Clay	Cretaceous
Difunta Formation	Cretaceous
Difunta Group/Adjuntas Formation	Paleogene
Difunta Group/Cerro del Pueblo Formation	Cretaceous
Difunta Group/Las Encinas Formation	Paleogene
Difunta Group/Olmos Formation	Cretaceous
Difunta Group/Potrerillos Formation	Paleogene
Difunta Group/Rancho Nuevo Formation	Paleogene, Cretaceous
Difunta Group/Tanque Formation	Cretaceous
Discovery Point Formation	Mexico
El Abra Formation	Cretaceous
El Bosque Formation	Paleogene
El Cajón Formation	Cretaceous
El Camarón Formation	Neogene
El Cien Formation	Paleogene
El Doctor Formation	Cretaceous
El Gallo Formation	Cretaceous
Encanto Formation	Neogene
Encino Formation	Cretaceous
Escondido Formation	Cretaceous
Espinazo del Diablo Formation	Cretaceous
Fallotaspis Group/Puerto Blanco Formation	Cambrian
Ferrotepec Formation	Neogene
Filisolo Formation	Neogene
Gamuza Formation	Ediacaran
Georgetown Formation	Cretaceous
Goleta Formation	Mexico
Guacamaya Formation	Permian
Guajalote Formation	Neogene
Guanajuato Conglomerate	Paleogene
Huasteca Formation	Paleogene
Huayacocotla Formation	Jurassic
Huizachal Formation	Triassic
Indidura Formation	Cretaceous
Infierno Formation	Neogene
Isidro Formation	Neogene
Ixaltepec Formation	Carboniferous
Jackson Formation	Paleogene
Javelina Formation	Cretaceous
Juchipila Formation	Neogene
La Boca Formation	Jurassic
La Bocana Roja Formation	Cretaceous
La Caja Formation	Jurassic
La Casita Formation	Jurassic
La Ciénega Formation	Cambrian, Ediacaran
La Colorada Formation	Permian
La Difunta Formation	Permian
La Esperanza Group/Ixtaclum Shale	Paleogene
La Esperanza Group/San Juan Formation	Paleogene
La Joya Formation	Carboniferous
La Péna Formation	Cretaceous
La Quinta Formation	Paleogene
Las Sardinas Formation	Permian
Las Tetas de Cabra Formation	Paleogene
Mal Paso Formation	Cretaceous
Matatlán Formation	Neogene
Mazantic Shale	Neogene
Méndez Formation	Cretaceous
Méndez Shale	Cretaceous
Mesón Formation	Paleogene
Mexcala Formation	Cretaceous
Midway Formation	Paleogene
Modelo Group/Rio Lajas Limestone	Neogene
Modelo Group/Santa Ana Formation	Early Miocene
Monos Formation	Permian
Mulege Formation	Mexico
Mural Formation	Cretaceous
Mural Limestone	Cretaceous
Nevadella Group/Puerto Blanco Formation	Cambrian
Oakville Sandstone	Neogene
Ocozocoautla Formation	Cretaceous
Ojinaga Formation	Cretaceous
Olinala Formation	Permian
Olmos Formation	Cretaceous
Palo Quemado Formation	Permian
Papalote Formation	Ediacaran
Paraje Solo Formation	Neogene
Patlanoaya Formation	Permian
Patlanoaya Beds Formation	Carboniferous
Pen Formation	Cretaceous
Pie de Vaca Formation	Paleogene
Pimienta Formation	Jurassic
Plomosas Formation	Permian
Pochote Formation	Cretaceous
Preitos Formation	Paleogene
Puerto Blanco Formation	Cambrian
Rancho Viejo Beds Formation	Neogene
Represo Formation	Carboniferous
Río Concepción Group/Balumtun Sandstone	Neogene
Río Sabinal Group/Lecheria Limestone	Paleogene
Rosario Formation	Jurassic/Cretaceous
Rosarito Beach Formation	Neogene
Salada Formation	Neogene
San Diego Formation	Neogene
San Felipe Formation	Cretaceous
San Gregorio Formation	Paleogene
San Hipolito Formation	Jurassic, Triassic
San José de Gracia Formation	Cambrian
San Juan Formation	Paleogene
San Juan Raya Formation	Cretaceous
San Lucas Formation	Cretaceous
San Marcos Formation	Neogene
San Rafael Formation	Paleogene
San Ricardo Formation	Jurassic
Santiago Formation	Carboniferous
Sepultura Formation	Paleogene
Sierra de Santa Rosa Formation	Jurassic
Sierra Madre Formation	Cretaceous
Simojovel Formation	Paleogene
Simojovel Group/La Quinta Formation	Neogene, Paleogene
Simojovel Group/Mazantic Shale	Neogene
Simojovel Group/Rancho Berlin Sandstone	Paleogene
Simón Formation	Jurassic
Soledad Formation	Cretaceous
Suchilquitongo Formation	Neogene
Taberna Formation	Jurassic
Tacubaya Formation	Quaternary
Taman Formation	Jurassic
Taraises Formation	Cretaceous
Taylor Marl	Cretaceous
Tecocoyunca Formation	Jurassic
Tecocoyunca Group/Cualac Conglomerate	Jurassic
Tecocoyunco Group/Zorrillo Formation	Jurassic
Tecomazuchil Formation	Jurassic
Temazcal Limestone	Cretaceous
Tepate Formation	Paleogene
Tepetate Formation	Paleogene
Tinu Formation	Ordovician, Cambrian
Tirabuzon Formation	Neogene
Tlayúa Formation	Cretaceous
Tortugas Formation	Neogene
Tuxpan Formation	Neogene
Tuzancoa Formation	Permian
Upper Becerra Formation	Mexico
Venada Formation	Carboniferous
Vicente Guerrero Formation	Carboniferous
Wilcox Group/Indio Formation	Paleogene
Ysidro Formation	Neogene
Yucunama Formation	Cretaceous
Zapotitlan Formation	Cretaceous
Zorrillo Formation	Jurassic
Zuluzum Formation	Neogene

== See also ==
- Lists of fossiliferous stratigraphic units in North America
