= Kingoceras =

Kingoceras Temporal range: Upper Permian

Scientific classification
- Domain: Eukaryota
- Kingdom: Animalia
- Phylum: Mollusca
- Class: Cephalopoda
- Subclass: †Ammonoidea
- Order: †Ceratitida
- Family: †Paraceltitidae
- Genus: †Kingoceras; Miller,1944

Species
- Kingoceras kingi; Kingoceras achurense

Genus of molluscs (fossil)

Kingoceras is a genus of ammonoids in the order Ceratitida and family Paraceltitidae which lived during the Late Permian from about 265 to about 254 million years ago. The shell is thinly lenticular, sutures are goniatitic and have only eight fully distinct lobes.

Two species are recognized. The type, Kingoceras kingi Miller 1944 comes from the Permian of state of Coahuila, Mexico, from concretionary shale and limestone of the La Difunta Formation and from offshore sandstone and mudstone of the La Colorada Formation. A second species, Kingoceras achurense, named by Zakharov 1983, is included, which comes from the Upper Permian Akhura Formation of Azerbaijan.
