= San Juan Formation =

San Juan Formation may refer to:

- San Juan Formation, Argentina, an Ordovician geologic formation in Argentina
- San Juan Formation, Mexico, an Eocene geologic formation in Mexico
- San Juan Raya Formation, an Albian geologic formation in Mexico
- San Juan Terrace Formation, a Pleistocene geologic formation in Peru

== See also ==
- San Juan volcanic field, in the San Juan Mountains, Colorado, U.S.
