= Santa Ana Formation =

Santa Ana Formation may refer to:

- Santa Ana Formation, Mexico, an Early Miocene geologic formation in Mexico
- Santa Ana Formation, Antofagasta, an Early Cretaceous geologic formation in Antofagasta, Chile
- Santa Ana Formation, Tierra del Fuego, a Maastrichtian geologic formation in Tierra del Fuego, Chile
- Santa Ana limestone, a member of the Cañón de Caballeros Formation in Mexico
