= Ypresian =

First age of the Eocene Epoch

- 56.00 – 48.07 Ma
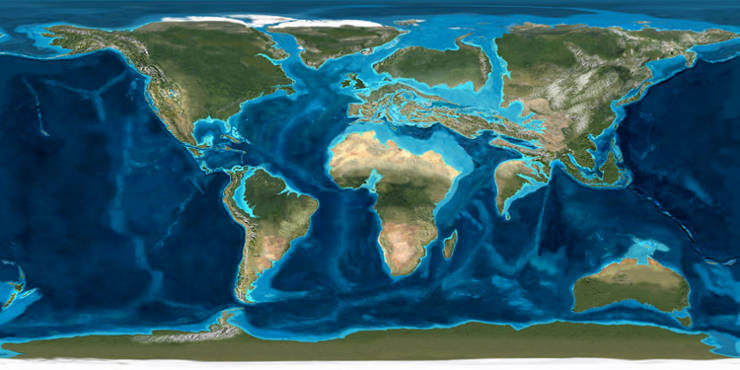
- Earth ~50 mya

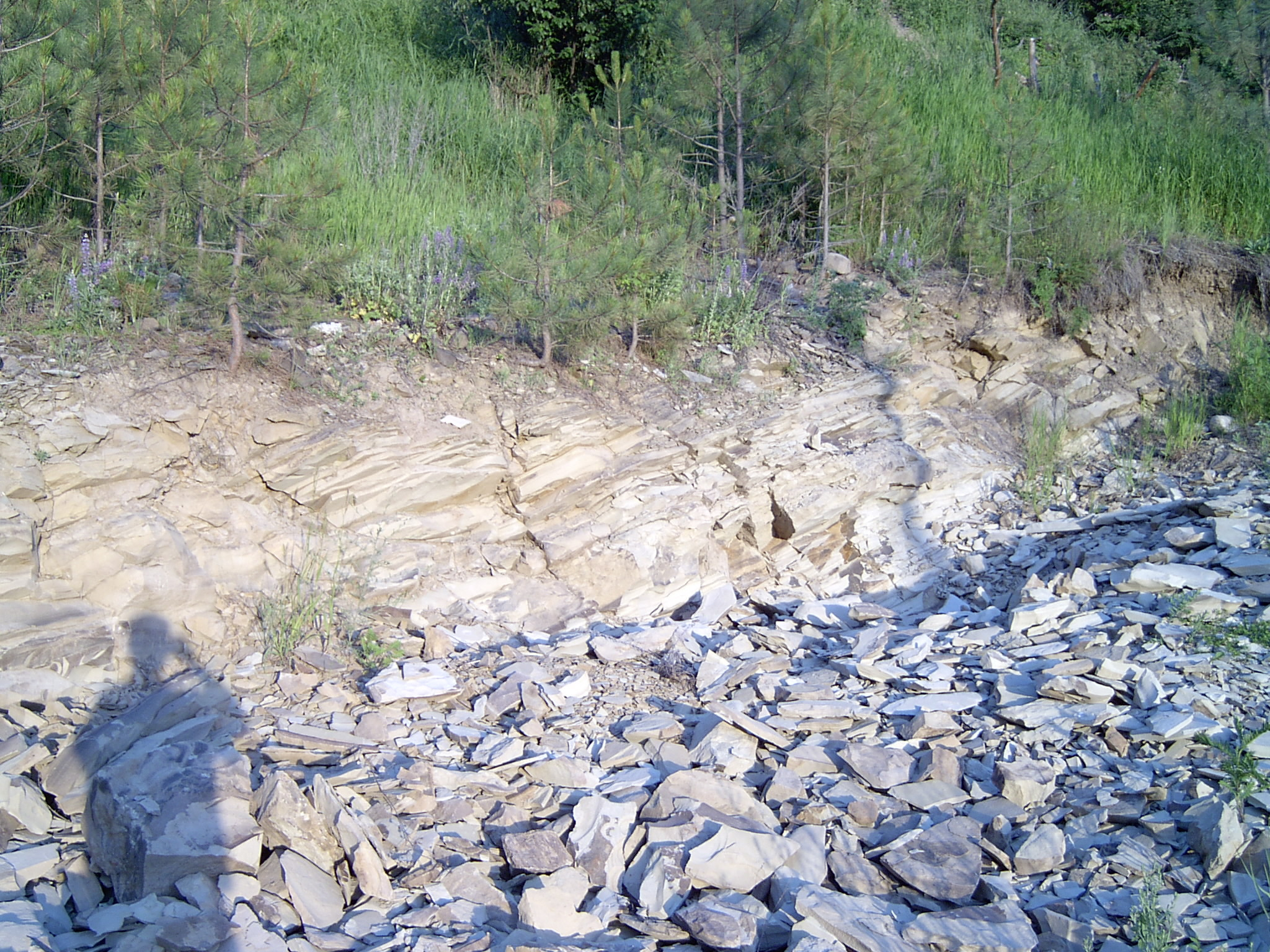
- Klondike Mountain Formation, Republic, Washington

Chronology
← / PETM; ← / First Antarctic permanent ice-sheets; ← / K-Pg mass extinction
Subdivision of the Paleogene according to the ICS, as of 2024. Vertical axis scale: Millions of years ago
- Formerly part of: Tertiary Period/System

Etymology
- Name formality: Formal

Usage information
- Celestial body: Earth
- Regional usage: Global (ICS)
- Time scale(s) used: ICS Time Scale

Definition
- Chronological unit: Age
- Stratigraphic unit: Stage
- First proposed by: Dumont
- Time span formality: Formal
- Lower boundary definition: Strong negative anomaly in δ^{13}C values at the PETM
- Lower boundary GSSP: Dababiya section, Luxor, Egypt; 25.5000°N 32.5311°E
- Lower GSSP ratified: 2003
- Upper boundary definition: FAD of the calcareous nannofossil Blackites inflatus
- Upper boundary GSSP: Gorrondatxe section, Western Pyrenees, Basque Country, Spain; 43.3796°N 3.0143°W
- Upper GSSP ratified: April 2011

In the geologic timescale, the Ypresian is the oldest age or lowest stratigraphic stage of the Eocene. It spans the time between 56 and 48.07 Ma, is preceded by the Thanetian Age (part of the Paleocene) and is followed by the Eocene Lutetian Age. The Ypresian is consistent with the Lower Eocene (Early Eocene). The beginning of the age is defined by a strong negative anomaly in δ^{13}C values at the Paleocene–Eocene thermal maximum (PETM).

== Palaeoclimatology ==
The Ypresian Age begins during the throes of the PETM. The Fur Formation in Denmark, the Messel shales in Germany, the Oise amber of France, and Cambay amber of India are of this age. The Eocene Okanagan Highlands are an uplands subtropical to temperate series of lakes from the Ypresian.

The Ypresian is additionally marked by another warming event called the Early Eocene climatic optimum (EECO), which is the longest sustained warming event in the Cenozoic record, lasting about 2–3 million years between 53 and 50 Ma. The interval is characterized by low oxygen-18 isotopes, high levels of atmospheric pCO_{2}, and low meridional thermal gradients. Biodiversity has been reported to have been significantly impacted by the conditions prevalent during the EECO. For instance, biotic turnovers occurred among marine producers such as calcareous nannofossils, among others.

Southern China was incredibly arid during the Ypresian, owing to a strong subtropical anticyclone engendered by extremely warm temperatures and a rain–shadow effect resulting from coastal mountains.

== Stratigraphic definition ==
The Ypresian Stage was introduced in scientific literature by Belgian geologist André Hubert Dumont in 1850. It is named after the Flemish city of Ypres in Belgium (spelled Ieper in Dutch). The definitions of the original stage are totally different from the modern ones. The Ypresian shares its name with the Belgian Ieper Group (French: Groupe d'Ypres), which has an Ypresian age.

The base of the Ypresian Stage is defined at a strong negative anomaly in δ^{13}C values at the PETM. The official reference profile (GSSP) for the base of the Ypresian is the Dababiya profile near the Egyptian city of Luxor. Its original type section was located in the vicinity of Ieper.

The top of the Ypresian (the base of the Lutetian) is identified by the first appearance of the foraminiferan genus Hantkenina in the fossil record.

The Ypresian Stage overlaps the upper Neustrian and most of the Grauvian European Land Mammal Mega Zones (it spans the mammal Paleogene zones 7 through 10.), the Wasatchian and lower and middle Bridgerian North American Land Mammal Ages, the Casamayoran South American Land Mammal Age, and the Bumbanian and most of the Arshantan Asian Land Mammal Ages. It is also coeval with the upper Wangerripian and lowest Johannian regional stages of Australia and the Bulitian, Penutian, and Ulatisian regional stages of California.

== Notable geological formations ==
Being a period of high sea levels, numerous geological formations worldwide were deposited during the Ypresian stage in both inland and marine habitats. The following fossiliferous geological formations are among those known from this time:

North America

- Manasquan Formation, New Jersey
- Nanjemoy Formation, Virginia and Maryland
- Bashi Formation, Alabama
- Hatchetigbee Bluff and Sabinetown Bluff Formations, Southeastern United States
- Klondike Mountain Formation, Republic & Curlew Basin, Washington State
- Crescent Formation, Washington
- Allenby and Coldwater Beds Formations and Ootsa Lake and Kamloops Group, British Columbia
- Lookingglass and Umpqua Formations, Oregon
- Wasatch Formation, and Tatman, Willwood, Wind River, Pass Peak and Indian Meadows Formations, Wyoming
- Challis Volcanics Formation, Idaho
- Golden Valley Formation, North Dakota
- Claron Formation, Utah
- Green River Formation, western United States
- Coalmont, Cuchara and DeBeque Formations, Colorado
- Sheep Pass Formation, Nevada
- San Jose and Galisteo Formations, New Mexico
- Capay, Juncal, Llajas, Maniobra, Matilija, Meganos & Santa Susana Formations, California
- Margaret Formation, Northwest Territories and Nunavut, Canada
- Mokka Fiord Formation, Remus Basin, Northern Territories
- Bateque and Las Tetas de Cabra Formations, Baja California
- Hannold Hill and Pendleton Ferry Formations, Gulf of Mexico
- Adjuntas and Indio Formations and Lechería Limestone, Mexico
- Descartes Formation, Costa Rica
- Stettin Formation, Jamaica
- Scotland Formation, Barbados
- Lizard Springs Formation, Trinidad and Tobago

South America

- Bogotá Formation, Altiplano Cundiboyacense, Colombia
- Cerrejón Formation, Cesar-Ranchería Basin, Colombia
- Los Cuervos Formation, Catatumbo, Cesar-Ranchería and Llanos Basins, Colombia
- Caballas Formation, Pisco Basin, Peru
- Chacras and Negritos Formations, Peru
- Fonseca Formation, Brazil
- Itaboraí Formation, Itaboraí Basin, Brazil
- Lumbrera Formation, Salta Basin, Argentina
- Laguna del Hunco Formation, Cañadón Asfalto Basin, Argentina
- Huitrera Formation, Neuquén Basin, Argentina
- Sarmiento and Ventana Formations, Golfo San Jorge Basin, Argentina
- Las Flores Formation, Austral Basin, Argentina

Antarctica

- lower La Meseta Formation

Europe

- Kortrijk Clay, Bruxellian Formation and Dormaal Member of Tienen Formation, Belgium
- Sables de Pierrefonds, Calcares marins à alvéolines, Lignites de Soissonais, Marnes de Foncouverte, Argiles d'lignite du Soissonnais, Marnes de Gan and Carcassonne Group, France
- Fur Formation, Ølst Formation and southeastern North Sea Graben, Denmark
- Balder Formation, Faroe-Shetland Basin, North Sea
- London Clay, Bagshot Formation, London Basin, England
- Oldhaven Formation, England
- Roterzschicht Formation, Austria
- Lefkara Formation, Cyprus
- Silveirinha Formation, Portugal
- Armàncies, Corca and Roda Formations, Spain
- Pesciara Formation, Italy
- Monte Spilecco, Monte Bolca, Italy

Asia

- Çeltek, Kirkkavak and Yoncali Formations, Turkey
- Umm al-Rua'us Formation, Saudi Arabia
- Alai Beds, Kyrgyzstan
- Ghazij, Mami Khel, Shekhan Formation and Kuldana Formations, Pakistan
- Cambay Shale, Naredi and Subathu Formations, Sylhet Limestone and Upper Ranikot Group, India
- Dabu, Qimugen Formation and Ulunguhe Formations, Xinjiang, China
- Arshanto Formation, Inner Mongolia, China
- Yangxi Formation, Hubei, China
- Lingcha Formation, Hunan, China
- Wutu Formation, Shandong, China
- Tadushi Formation, Primorsky Krai, Russia
- Takaradayskaya Formation, Sakhalin, Russia
- Ommai Formation, Kamchatka, Russia
- Akasaki Formation, Japan

Africa

- Esna, El Rufuf Formation and Thebes Formations, Egypt
- Al Jir and Jdeir Formations, Libya
- Gafsa Phosphates Formation, Tunisia
- Ait Ouarhitane Formation, Morocco
- Tamaguélelt Formation, Mali
- Thies Formation, Senegal
- Auradu Formation, Somalia
- Landana Formation, Cabinda, Angola

Oceania

- Red Bluff Tuff Formation, Tutuiri Greensand and Tumaio and Te Whanga Limestones, New Zealand
- Macquarie Harbor Formation, Tasmania, Australia
- Dilwyn Formation, Victoria
- Redbank Plains Formation, Queensland
- Jubilee Member of Cardabia Formation, Western Australia
