= La Joya Formation =

Geologic formation in Mexico

- Stratigraphic range: Mid-Late Jurassic; ~181–163 Ma
- Type: Geologic formation
- Underlies: Indidura Formation
- Overlies: La Boca Formation, Huizachal Formation

Lithology
- Primary: Marine sediments

Location
- Region: Sierra Madre Oriental, Tamaulipas
- Country: Mexico

The La Joya Formation is a Jurassic period geologic formation in north central Mexico. It is located in the Sierra Madre Oriental range, in southwestern Tamaulipas state.

It preserves fossils dating back to the Jurassic period.

== See also ==
- List of fossiliferous stratigraphic units in Mexico
