= Sierra Madre Formation =

Geologic formation in Chiapas state, southern Mexico

- Stratigraphic range: Aptian-Cenomanian; ~120–94 Ma
- Type: Geologic formation
- Underlies: Ocozocoautla Formation
- Overlies: Santiago & San Ricardo Formations
- Thickness: Composite: 2,590 m (8,500 ft)

Lithology
- Primary: Marine limestones
- Other: Marine dolomite

Location
- Coordinates: 16.8°N 93.4°W
- Approximate paleocoordinates: 13.8°N 59.7°W
- Region: Chiapas
- Country: Mexico

Type section
- Named for: Sierra Madre de Chiapas
- Named by: Gutiérrez Gil
- Year defined: 1956
- Sierra Madre Formation (Mexico) Sierra Madre Formation (Chiapas)

The Sierra Madre Formation is a geologic formation in Chiapas state, southern Mexico. It consists of marine dolomites and limestones. The formation dates to the Middle Cretaceous, spanning from the Aptian of the Early to the Cenomanian of the Late Cretaceous.

The dolomites, dolomitic breccias and limestones of the formation have been deposited in a lagoonal to estuarine environment and contain many fossil fish, flora and rudists, typical reef-building organisms of the Cretaceous.

The formation rests on top of the Santiago and San Ricardo Formations, and is overlain by the Campanian to Maastrichtian Ocozocoautla Formation. The thickness of a composite section of the formation amounts to 2,590 metres (8,500 ft).

== Description ==
The Sierra Madre Formation was first formally described by Gutiérrez Gil in 1956, but previously reported by other authors (Böse, 1905; Ver Wiebe, 1925; Müllerried, 1936; Imlay, 1944). The formation was studied in more detail and subdivided in several members (Chubb, 1959; Sánchez-Montes de Oca, 1969; Zavala-Moreno, 1971; Castro-Mora et al., 1975; Michaud, 1987; Quezada-Muñetón, 1987).

A composed thickness of 2,590 metres (8,500 ft) was suggested by Steele and Waite (1986) for the Sierra Madre Formation, subdivided into 21 lithofacies. The lowermost lithofacies corresponds to the stratigraphic level of El Espinal quarry, defined by Steele and Waite (1986) as dolomite and dolomitic breccia, located between 650 and 700 metres (2,130 and 2,300 ft) from the base of the formation, which rests conformably on top of the Late Jurassic to Early Cretaceous San Ricardo Formation. The top is covered unconformably by the Campanian to Maastrichtian Ocozocoautla Formation.

The depositional environment is described as an environment with high oxygen concentration and high primary productivity with sporadic influence of strong waves and/or currents in a brackish marginal marine environment; shallow lagoon or estuary.

== Fossil content ==
The formation preserves fossil fish, flora and marine invertebrates dating back to the Cretaceous period, ranging from the Aptian of the Early Cretaceous to the Cenomanian of the Late Cretaceous.

The fossils in El Espinal quarry were found in finely laminated orange clay layers interbedded with dolomitic limestone and interbedded with relatively thick layers of cream limestone that range from 5 to 10 centimetres (2.0 to 3.9 in), with some layers showing ripples, desiccation cracks, algal mats, and flat-pebble conglomerates.

Similar fossils have been found in the Tlayúa Formation, of Albian age in Puebla, southern Mexico, as fishes, one odonate nymph and isopods.

=== Fish ===
Fossils of Archaeochiapasa mardoqueoi and Pepemkay, a Cenomanian prehistoric ray-finned fish, were found in the formation. Other prehistoric fish fossils, found in quarries near the Municipality of Ocozocoautla de Espinosa, include Macrosemiids (Macrosemiocotzus species), Clupeomorphs (Triplomystus applegatei and Paraclupea-like species), and Alepisauriformes (Saurorhamphus and Enchodus species).

=== Rudists ===
These rudists are reported from the formation:

- Caprinuloidea sp.
- Coalcomana sp.
- Kimbleia sp.
- Radiolites sp.
- Requienia sp.
- Sauvagesia sp.
- Texicaprina sp.
- Toucasia sp.

=== Flora ===
The following flora were found in the formation:

- Ephedra
- Arecipites sp.
- Osmunda sp.
- Selaginella sp.
- Sphagnum sp.
- Bombacaceae indet.
- Lauraceae indet.
- Moraceae indet.

== See also ==
- Cretaceous Mexico
- List of fossiliferous stratigraphic units in Mexico
- Cedar Mountain Formation, contemporaneous fossiliferous formation in eastern Utah
- Escucha Formation, contemporaneous fossiliferous formation in Spain
- Santana Group, contemporaneous fossiliferous group in northeastern Brazil containing the Lagerstätten
  - Crato Formation
  - Romualdo Formation
- Kem Kem Beds, contemporaneous fossiliferous formation in Morocco
- Burmese amber, contemporaneous paleoecology from Myanmar
