= Boca Roja Formation =

Geologic formation in Mexico

- Stratigraphic range: Cretaceous
- Type: Formation

Location
- Region: Tamaulipas
- Country: Mexico

The Boca Roja Formation is a geologic formation located at Huizachal Canyon in Tamaulipas, northeastern Mexico. The formation preserves fossils that were found in rocks dating back to the Cretaceous period. Another dinosaur-bearing formations is the Late Campanian El Gallo Formation. The Boca Roja Formation contains the oldest dinosaur remains found in Mexico.

== See also ==
- List of fossiliferous stratigraphic units in Mexico
