= Cantaure Formation =

Cantaure Formation may refer to:

- Cantaure Formation, Mexico, Neogene geologic formation of Mexico
- Cantaure Formation, Venezuela, a fossiliferous stratigraphic unit in Venezuela
