= Sabinal =

Sabinal may refer to:

- Cayo Sabinal, island in Cuba
- Rio Sabinal Group, a geologic group in Mexico
- Sabinal, Texas
