= Indio Formation =

Geologic formation in the Nuevo León and Tamaulipas regions of Mexico

- Stratigraphic range: Ypresian (Wasatchian-Bridgerian); ~55–48 Ma
- Type: Formation
- Unit of: Wilcox Group

Lithology
- Primary: Sandstone, shale
- Other: Conglomerate, claystone

Location
- Region: Nuevo León and Tamaulipas
- Country: Mexico

The Indio Formation is a geologic formation of the Wilcox Group in Mexico. The sandstones, shales, conglomerates and claystones preserve fossils dating back to the Ypresian age (Wasatchian to Bridgerian in the NALMA classification) of the Eocene epoch of the Paleogene period.

== See also ==
- List of fossiliferous stratigraphic units in Mexico
- Klondike Mountain Formation
- Nanjemoy Formation
- Lechería Limestone
