= Guacamaya =

Guacamaya(s) may refer to:

- Guacamaya, a Spanish (originally Taino) word for a macaw or the thick-billed parrot (Rhynchopsitta pachyrhyncha)
- Guacamaya (plant), a genus of plants native to South America
- Guacamaya Formation, a geologic formation in Mexico
- Guacamayas, Boyacá, a town and municipality in the Colombian Department of Boyacá
- Guacamaya (snack), a Mexican snack from León, Guanajuato
- Guacamaya (hacktivist), a hacktivist group named after the Spanish word
