= Meitianoceras =

Meitianoceras Temporal range: Late Permian

Scientific classification
- Domain: Eukaryota
- Kingdom: Animalia
- Phylum: Mollusca
- Class: Cephalopoda
- Subclass: †Ammonoidea
- Order: †Ceratitida
- Family: †Paraceltitidae
- Genus: †Meitianoceras; Zheng,1984

Species
- See text

Genus of molluscs (fossil)

Meitianoceras is a genus of ammonites in the ceratitid family Paraceltitidae that lived during the final stage of the Permian, from about 254 to 251 million years ago. The shell of Meitianoceras is small and evolute. All whorls being clearly visible. The outer rim (venter) is angular. The surface of the shell has growth lines or plications. The suture is of the Paraceltites type with 8 unserrated lobes and long, anteriorly, contracted club-shaped external saddles.

The type species Meitianoceras meitianense, named by Zheng, 1984, one of three species recognized, was first discovered in the Upper Permian Changhsingian Upper Coal Series Formation, in Hunan, China. It has also been found in the Dalong Formation of the same age in Hubei. M. paulum and M. sphaelobatum, named by Yang and Yang in 1992, were both first found also in the Dalong Formation in Hubei, China.
