= Potrerillos Formation =

Potrerillos Formation may refer to:

- Potrerillos Formation, Mexico, a Cretaceous to Paleocene geologic formation of Mexico
- Potrerillos Formation, Argentina, a Triassic geologic formation of the Cuyo Basin, Argentina
