= Doulingoceras =

Doulingoceras Temporal range: 260.5–254 Ma Wuchiapingian

Scientific classification
- Kingdom: Animalia
- Phylum: Mollusca
- Class: Cephalopoda
- Subclass: †Ammonoidea
- Order: †Ceratitida
- Family: †Paraceltitidae
- Genus: †Doulingoceras; Zhou, 1985

Species
- See text

Genus of molluscs (fossil)

Doulingoceras is a genus of ammonoid within the ceratitid order, found in China, that lived during the Late Permian during the time span from about 260.5 to 254 million years ago. The genus is included in the family Paraceltitidae, which belongs to the superfamily Xenodiscaceae.

Doulingoceras produced a narrowly discoidal evolute shell with concave sides, a narrowly rounded rim (venter) that bears several longitudinal lirae, and transverse rigs that have nodes at the umbilical and ventrolateral shoulders that form spiral belts. The suture is identical to that of Paraceltites in which the lobes are unserrated.

Doulingoceras closely resembles Paraceltites in the shape of shell and suture; but it may be distinguished from the latter by the concave sides and the node-like transverse ribs in the early stage and two rows of nodes distributed respectively along the ventral edge and the umbilical shoulder at maturity.

The type species, Doulingoceras nodosum, named by Zhou, 1985, was originally found in black marine mudstone in the Douling Formation in Hunan Provence, China.

== Species ==
According to GONIAT.org there are 2 species; they are:

- Doulingoceras costituberosum
- Doulingoceras nodosum (Type)
