= Encino =

Encino, the masculine of encina, Spanish for holm oak, may refer to:

== Places ==
=== United States ===
- Encino, Los Angeles, California, a neighborhood
- Encino, New Mexico, a village
- Encino, Texas, a census-designated place

=== Colombia ===
- Encino, Santander, a municipality

== Other uses ==
- Encino (album), a 2024 album by Pixie Lott
- Hyundai Kona, a 2017 SUV sold in China as the Hyundai Encino

== See also ==
- Encino Formation, a geologic formation in Mexico
- El Encino Stakes, an American Thoroughbred horse race run between 1954 and 2011
