= Carbonera Formation =

Carbonera Formation can refer to:

- Carbonera Formation, Mexico, Early Cretaceous geologic formation in Mexico
- Carbonera Formation, Colombia, Late Eocene to Early Miocene geologic formation in Colombia, in the Llanos Basin
