= Encanto (disambiguation) =

Encanto is a 2021 American animated film.

Encanto may also refer to:

== Music ==
- Encanto, the former musical group of American Tejano musician Laura Canales
- Encanto (album), 2008, the thirty-sixth studio album by Brazilian musician Sérgio Mendes
- Encanto (soundtrack), 2021, the soundtrack album to the 2021 film of the same name
- Encanto (EP), 2013, an EP by Lantana
- "El Encanto" (song), a tune by Charles Lloyd; see A Night in Copenhagen

== Places ==
- Encanto, Rio Grande do Norte, Brazil; a municipality located in Rio Grande do Norte, Brazil
- El Encanto Lake, a seasonal lake on the border of Bolivia and Brazil
- El Encanto, Amazonas, Colombia; a town and municipality on the Caraparaná River
- El Encanto, Pital, San Carlos, Costa Rica
- Encanto, Phoenix, Arizona, US; one of the fifteen urban villages that make up the city of Phoenix, in Arizona
- Encanto, San Diego, California, US; a hilly urban neighborhood located in the southeastern region of San Diego, California
- El Encanto Falls, Canaima National Park, Bolivar, Venezuela; a waterfall

== Facilities and structures ==
- El Encanto Hotel, Santa Barbara, California, US; a hotel
- El Encanto Estates, Tucson, Arizona, US; see List of historic properties in Tucson, Arizona
- El Encanto, Monterey Park, California, US
- El Encanto department store, Havana, Cuba; that was destroyed in the 1961 El Encanto fire
- El Encanto Airport (IATA airport code ECO), El Encanto, Colombia; see List of airports by IATA airport code: E
- Encanto Dam, Tlapacoyan, Veracruz, Mexico; see List of power stations in Mexico

=== Train stations ===
- Encanto/62nd Street station, a San Diego Trolley station in California, US
- Encanto/Central Avenue station, a Valley Metro light rail station in Arizona, US
- El Encanto (Venezuela), a train station on the Great Venezuela Railway in Venezuela

=== Parks ===
- Encanto Park, Phoenix, Arizona, US; a public park
- Parque El Encanto, a park created from a portion of the Great Venezuela Railway

== Other uses ==
- Anito (also encanto), ancestor spirits, nature spirits, and deities in the indigenous Philippine folk religions
- Encanto Formation, Mexico; a geologic formation
- Encanto, a brand of food from Mexilink

== See also ==
- Isla del encanto (the Enchanted Isle), Spanish-language nickname for the Spanish-speaking locality of Puerto Rico, US
- Tierra del Encanto (the Enchanted Land), Spanish-language nickname for New Mexico, US
