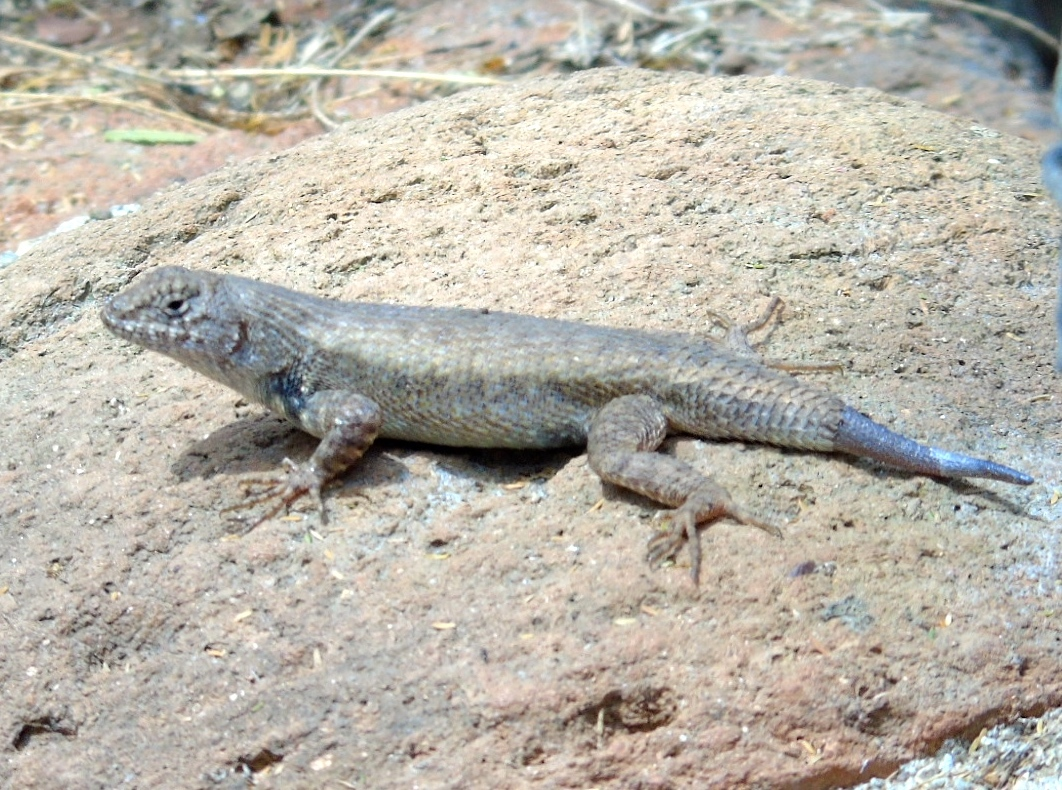

Conservation status
- Least Concern (IUCN 3.1)

Scientific classification
- Kingdom: Animalia
- Phylum: Chordata
- Class: Reptilia
- Order: Squamata
- Suborder: Iguania
- Family: Phrynosomatidae
- Genus: Sceloporus
- Species: S. nelsoni

Binomial name
- Sceloporus nelsoni Cochran, 1923

Subspecies
- Sceloporus nelsoni nelsoni Cochran, 1923; Sceloporus nelsoni barrancarum W. Tanner & Robison, 1960

= Sceloporus nelsoni =

Species of lizard

Sceloporus nelsoni, also known commonly as Nelson's lizard, Nelson's spiny lizard, and la espinosa de Nelson in Mexican Spanish, is a species of lizard in the subfamily Sceloporinae of the family Phrynosomatidae. The species is endemic to Mexico, and contains two recognized subspecies: Sceloporus nelsoni barrancarum and Sceloporus nelsoni nelsoni.

== Etymology ==
The specific name, nelsoni, is in honor of American ornithologist Edward William Nelson.

== Geographic distribution ==
Sceloporus nelsoni is endemic to Mexico, being distributed in western Mexico in the foothills of the Sierra Madre Occidental. Its distribution extends from southern Sonora, southwestern Chihuahua, Sinaloa, Nayarit, and central Jalisco. The type locality of the subspecies S. n. barrancarum is in Urique, Chihuahua. The type locality of the subspecies S. n. nelsoni is in Plomosas, Sinaloa.

== Habitat ==
Sceloporus nelsoni occurs in habitats of lowlands with tropical deciduous and semi-deciduous forests on rocks, often being associated with rocky slopes.

== Reproduction ==
Sceloporus nelsoni is oviparous.

== Subspecies ==
The following two subspecies are recognized as being valid, including the nominotypical subspecies.

- Sceloporus nelsoni barrancarum W. Tanner & Robison, 1960 – northern Nelson's lizard, espinosa boreal de Nelson
- Sceloporus nelsoni nelsoni Cochran, 1923 – southern Nelson's lizard, espinosa austral de Nelson

== Conservation ==
The IUCN Red List has assessed Seloporus nelsoni as "Least Concern" in 2007, due to its wide distribution, presumed large population, and lack of any known major threats. It also occurs in at least one protected area.
