= Becerra Formation =

Geologic formation in Mexico

- Type: Formation

Location
- Country: Mexico

The Becerra Formation is a geologic formation in Mexico. It preserves fossils.

== See also ==
- List of fossiliferous stratigraphic units in Mexico
