= Coatepec =

Coatepec (Nahuatl for "at the snake hill") may refer to:

== Geography ==
- Coatepec Harinas, a municipality in the State of Mexico
- Coatepec, Puebla, a municipality in Puebla
- Coatepec, Santiago Texcalcingo, a village in Santiago Texcalcingo, Oaxaca
- Coatepec, Veracruz, a municipality in Veracruz
- Coatepec, Villaflores, a village in Villaflores, Chiapas

== Other ==
- Coatepec Nahuatl, a variety of the Nahuatl language
- Coatepec Sandstone, a geological formation in Mexico
