= San Gregorio Formation =

San Gregorio Formation may refer to:

- San Gregorio Formation, Mexico, Paleogene geologic formation of Mexico
- San Gregorio Formation, Uruguay, Permian geologic formation of Uruguay
- San Gregorio Formation, Venezuela, Pliocene geologic formation of Venezuela
