= Ojinaga Formation =

- Stratigraphic range: Turonian Mesozoic
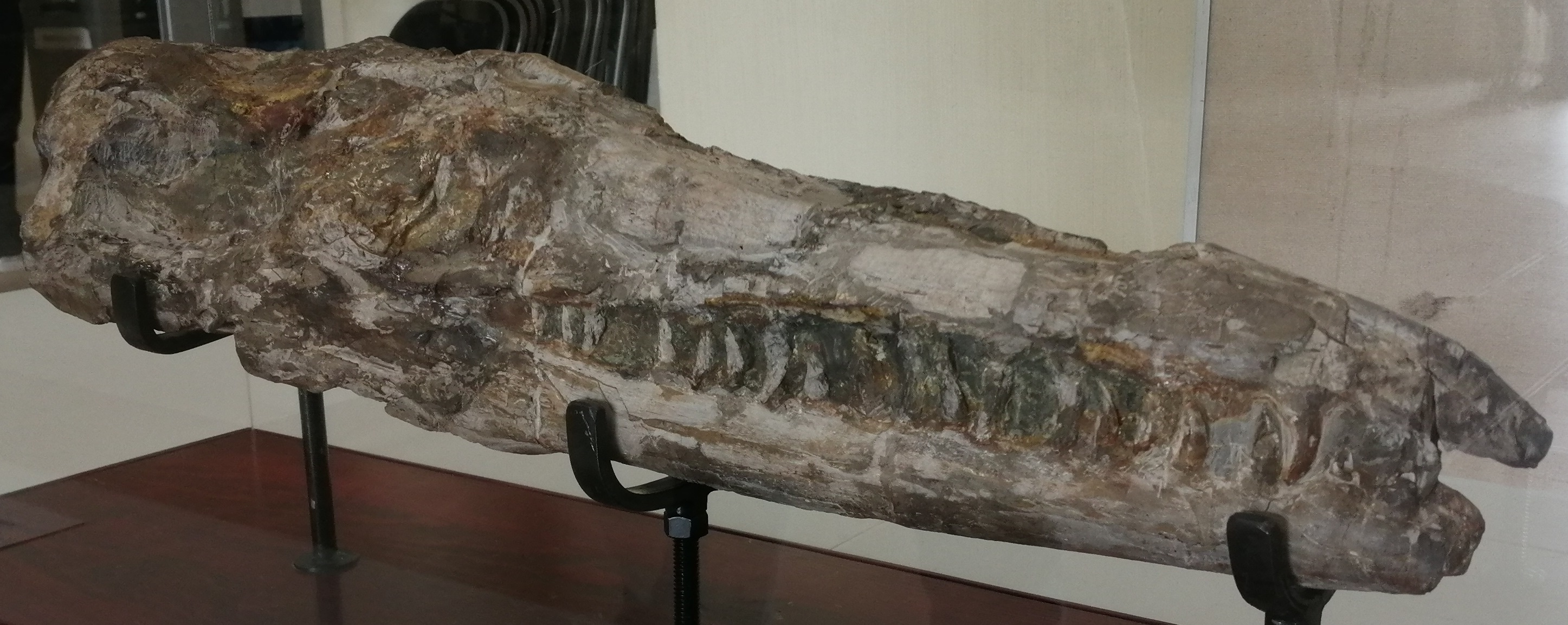
- Skull of Tylosaurus cf. (kansasensis) nepaeolicus (SGM-M1) from Ojinaga Municipality, Chihuahua, Mexico
- Type: Geological formation
- Sub-units: Nogal Formation, Picacho Formation
- Underlies: San Carlos Formation
- Overlies: Aurora Limestone, Buda Formation
- Thickness: 148–1395 m

Lithology
- Primary: Limestone
- Other: Shale, Sandstone

Location
- Region: South North America
- Country: United States, Mexico

Type section
- Named for: Ojinaga Municipality
- Named by: R.H. Burrows

The Ojinaga Formation is a Mesozoic geologic formation. Dinosaur remains are among the fossils that have been recovered from the formation, although none have yet been referred to a specific genus.

== Vertebrate paleofauna ==
- Tylosaurus cf. (kansasensis) nepaeolicus

== Invertebrate paleofauna ==
- Inoceramus sp.
- Globochaete alpina
- Favusella iltermanne
- Hedbergella sp.
- Sacoccoma sp.
- Rotalipora sp.
- Heterohelix sp.
- Leoblichaella cf. bentonensis
- Clavihedbergella sp.
- Mammites nodosides
- Collignomiceras chispaense
- Pryonocycloceras gabrielensis
- Texanites stangeri
- Texanites densicostatus
- Submortoniceras tequesquitense
- Inoceramus undulatuplicatus
- Placenticeras planum
- Eutrephoceras dekayi
- Eutrephoceras alcesense
- Baculites sp.
- Exogyra poderosa
- Exogyra erraticostata

== See also ==
- List of dinosaur-bearing rock formations
  - List of stratigraphic units with indeterminate dinosaur fossils
