= Gamuza Formation =

Geologic formation in Mexico

- Stratigraphic range: Ediacaran
- Type: Formation
- Underlies: Papalote Formation
- Overlies: Pitiquito Quartzite

Location
- Country: Mexico

The Gamuza Formation is a geologic formation in Mexico. It preserves fossils dating back to the Ediacaran period.

== See also ==
- List of fossiliferous stratigraphic units in Mexico
