= Papalote Formation =

Geologic formation in Mexico

- Stratigraphic range: Ediacaran
- Type: Formation
- Underlies: Tecolote Quartzite
- Overlies: Gamuza Formation

Location
- Country: Mexico

The Papalote Formation is a geologic formation in Mexico. It preserves fossils dating back to the Ediacaran period.

== Size ==
The Papalote Formation is 404.5 meters (1327.09 feet) thick. It is divided into six units. Unit 1 is 31.5 m (103.34 ft) thick & consists of red siltstone, quartzite & dolomite. Unit 2 is around 20 m (65.6 ft) & is made up of dolomite. Unit 3 is 7.5 m (24.6 ft) & is built up of silty dolomite & dolomite siltstone. Unit 4 contains thin-bedded dolomite, & Domal stromatolites take place in the lower areas. It is 157 m (around 515 ft) thick. Unit 5's sandy dolomite & quartzite make up its 31.5 m (103.34 ft) thickness. Finally, Unit 6 is 157 m (around 515 ft) & consists of dolomite & siltstone on the lower end.

== Location ==
The Papalote Formation is located in the northernmost part of the eastern flank of the Cerro El Arpa area & overlies the Gamuza Formation, however the top is not exposed. It is also in the Cerro Gamuza region.

== See also ==
- List of fossiliferous stratigraphic units in Mexico
