= Discovery Point Formation =

Fossiliferous geologic formation in Mexico

- Type: Formation

Location
- Country: Mexico

The Discovery Point Formation is a geologic formation in Mexico. It preserves fossils.

== See also ==
- List of fossiliferous stratigraphic units in Mexico
