= Point Loma Formation =

Geological formation in Southern California, United States

Coordinates: 32.6744°N 117.2450°W

- Stratigraphic range: Late Cretaceous
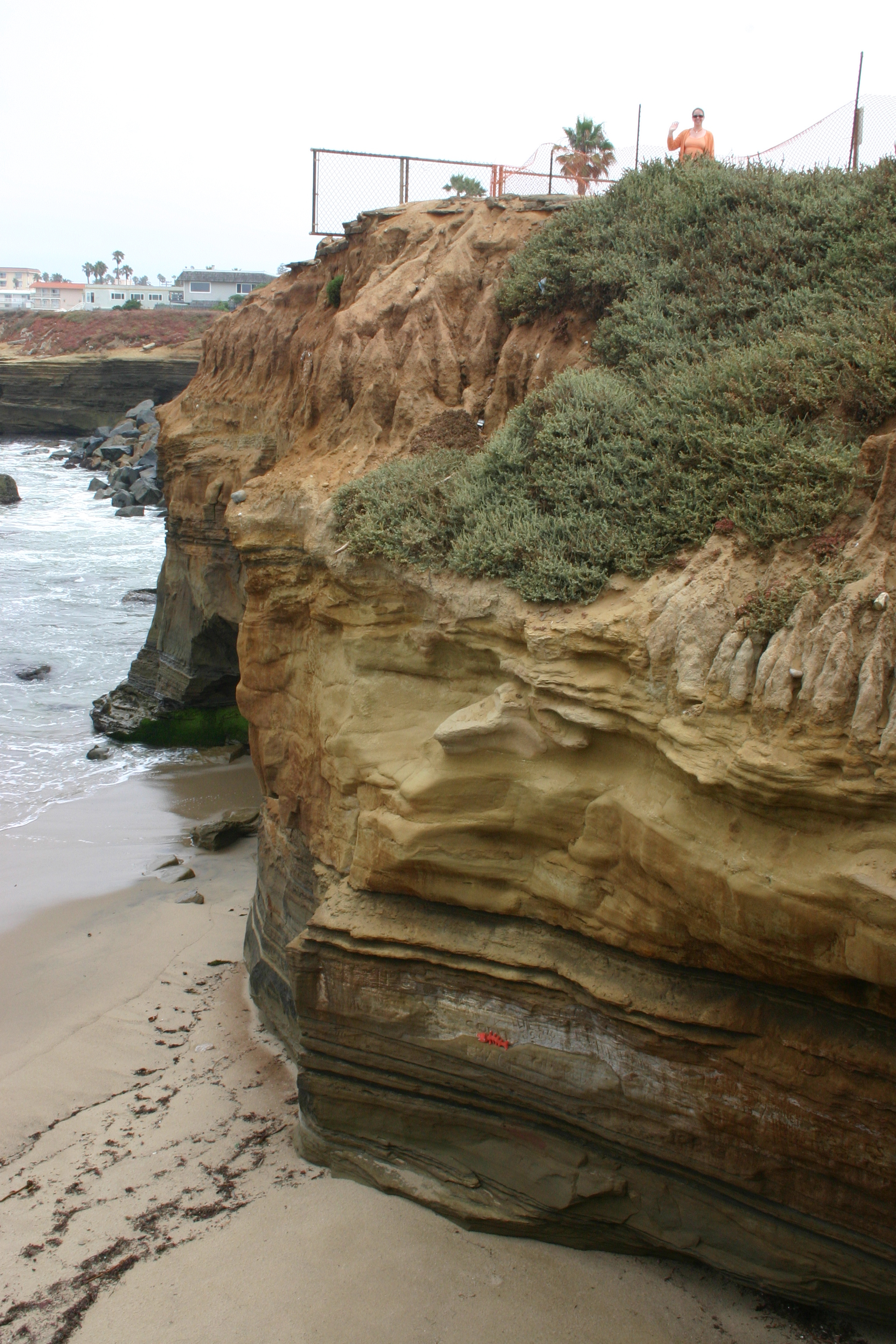
- Typical exposure of the Point Loma Formation at Sunset Cliffs
- Type: Geological formation
- Unit of: Rosario Group
- Underlies: Cabrillo Formation
- Overlies: Lusardi Formation
- Thickness: 1,300 ft (400 m)

Lithology
- Primary: Sandstone, shale, siltstone

Location
- Region: California
- Country: United States
- Extent: Point Loma to La Jolla; San Diego County; California

Type section
- Named for: Point Loma
- Named by: Kennedy and Moore
- Year defined: 1971

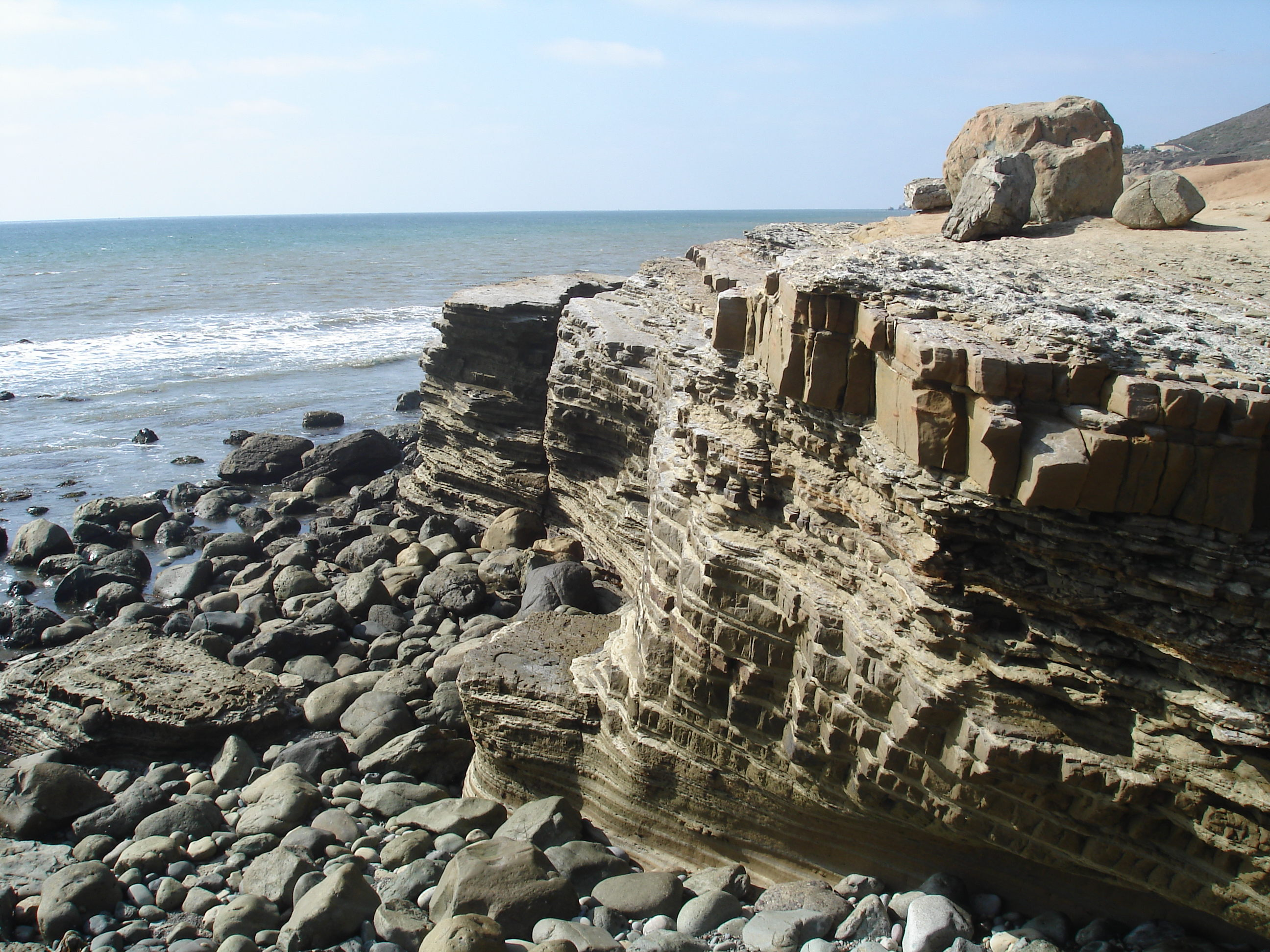
Turbidites in the Point Loma Formation at Cabrillo Park

The Point Loma Formation is a sedimentary geological formation in Southern California. The strata date back to the Late Cretaceous epochs of the Cretaceous period, during the Mesozoic Era.

The formation is named after the Point Loma peninsula in southwestern San Diego County, California.

== Description ==
The Point Loma Formation was first described as the middle formation of the Rosario Group by Kennedy and Moore in 1971. Their description is that the lower half is composed of interbedded fine-grained, dusky yellow sandstone and olive-gray clay shale in ledgy graded beds about 7.9 inches (20 cm) thick, which grades into massive grayish-black siltstone in the top half of the formation.

Part of the Rosario Group, it overlies the Lusardi Formation, and underlies the Cabrillo Formation. The formation is found from Point Loma north to La Jolla, within the city of San Diego.

=== Fossils ===
The formation contains foraminifers, mollusks, and coccoliths. These were used to date the formation biostratigraphically.

Dinosaur remains have been recovered from this formation. In 1967 Brad Riney found a single hadrosaur neck vertebra in a sea cave in La Jolla. In 1983 he found a femur of a hadrosaur in Carlsbad and in 1986 thirteen cervical vertebrae of another hadrosaur. In 1987 Riney discovered teeth and fragments of the postcranium of the ankylosaur Aletopelta coombsi. In about 1980 Leon Case found the midsection of a right dentary with teeth of a hadrosaur while walking along a beach in San Diego County.

== See also ==
- Cretaceous California
- Geology of San Diego County, California
- List of dinosaur-bearing rock formations
