= San Ricardo Formation =

Geologic formation in México

- Stratigraphic range: Late Jurassic-Early Cretaceous; ~150–140 Ma
- Type: Formation
- Underlies: Sierra Madre Formation

Location
- Region: Chiapas
- Country: Mexico

The San Ricardo Formation is a geologic formation in Mexico. It preserves fossils dating back to the Late Jurassic to Early Cretaceous periods.

== See also ==
- List of fossiliferous stratigraphic units in Mexico
