= Méndez Shale =

Mexican geologic formation

- Stratigraphic range: Maastrichtian
- Type: Formation

Location
- Region: Nuevo Leon
- Country: Mexico

The Méndez Shale is a geologic formation in Mexico. It preserves fossils dating back to the Cretaceous period.

== Fossil content ==
Color key: Taxon / Reclassified taxon / Taxon falsely reported as present / Dubious taxon or junior synonym / Ichnotaxon / Ootaxon / Morphotaxon	Notes; Uncertain or tentative taxa are in small text; ~~crossed out~~ taxa are discredited.

=== Mosasaurs ===
Mosasaurs of the Mendez Shale
Genus	Species	Location	Stratigraphic position	Material	Notes	Image
Prognathodon	M. cipactli	Nuevo Leon, Mexico	Maastrichtian		A prognathodontin mosasaurine	

== See also ==
- List of fossiliferous stratigraphic units in Mexico
