= Paraceltitidae =

Paraceltitidae Temporal range: Middle to Upper Permian

Scientific classification
- Domain: Eukaryota
- Kingdom: Animalia
- Phylum: Mollusca
- Class: Cephalopoda
- Subclass: †Ammonoidea
- Order: †Ceratitida
- Superfamily: †Xenodiscoidea
- Family: †Paraceltitidae; Spath, 1930

Genera
- Cibolites; Doulingoceras; Kingoceras; Meitianoceras; Nielsenoceras; Paraceltites

Paraceltitidae is a family of Middle and Upper Permian cephalopods, that comprise the earliest of the Ceratitida. Paraceltitidids have variably ribbed, discoidally evolute shells with compressed elliptical whorl sections and simple suture lines. Their origin is most likely in the Daraelitidae of the Prolecanitida and they are the apparent source of the Xenodiscidae. All together they lived for some 12 million years, from about 270.6 to about 258 million years ago.

Paraceltitidae was named by Spath in 1930, however the taxon is omitted in the Treatise on Invertebrate Paleontology Part L, 1957 wherein respective genera are included in the Xenodiscidae. The family has returned to recognition and has been used by Tozer, 1981 and more recently by Leonova in 2002 and by Korn in 2006.
