= Cibolites =

Cibolites Temporal range: Upper Permian

Scientific classification
- Domain: Eukaryota
- Kingdom: Animalia
- Phylum: Mollusca
- Class: Cephalopoda
- Subclass: †Ammonoidea
- Order: †Ceratitida
- Family: †Paraceltitidae
- Genus: †Cibolites; Plummer and Scott, 1937

Genus of molluscs (fossil)

Cibolites is a genus of ammonoid in the family Paraceltitidae of the cephalopod order Ceratitida which lived during the Late Permian. The genus was first found the Texas and Mexico. The shell is similar to that of Xenodiscites but smooth and with goniatitic sutures.

Cibolites was named by Plummer and Scott, 1937 and has been found in China, Japan, Oman, and Tunisia. The type species is Cibolites udden.
