= Juchipila Formation =

Geological formation in Mexico

- Stratigraphic range: Neogene
- Type: Formation

Location
- Coordinates: 21.7° N, 102.8° W
- Country: Mexico

The Juchipila Formation is a geologic formation in Mexico. It preserves fossils dating back to the Neogene period. Closely corresponding to the other Hemphillian faunal assemblages of North America, it is significant for understanding the palaeofauna of Miocene and Pliocene central Mexico.

== Paleoenvironment ==
The paleoenvironment of the Juchipila Formation was largely terrestrial in nature. The El Mixton locality consists of a shallow lacustrine succession, beginning near the bottom of an arroyo. Ostracods and gastropods are abundant in these deposits. A thin bed of unconsolidated white ash-fall material, consisting of felsic glass shards and small, overlies the shallow lacustrine succession of the El Mixton locality. In this part of the succession, camelid and proboscidian footprints are known. The loose paleosols of the El Mixton contain mammal fossils, including the canid Borophagus and the equid Dinohippus. The terrestrial Puente de Cofradía locality bears fossils of Calippus and Cosoryx. The volcaniclastic sandstone of the El Resbalón bears indeterminate megalonychids and antilocaprids.

== Paleobiota ==
The Juchipila Formation has yielded a rich variety of extinct mammals.

=== Mammals ===
Genus	Species	Notes	Images
Alforjas	A. taylori	A camelid	
Astrohippus	A. ansae		
Antilocapridae indet.	Genus and species indeterminate.	A pronghorn.	
Borophagus	B. secundus	Originally Osteoborus secundus	
Calippus	C. hondurensis	Originally Calippus (Grammohippus) hondurensis	
cf. Cosoryx sp.	Species indeterminate	An antilocaprid	
Dinohippus	D. mexicanus		
Machairodontinae indet.	Genus and species indeterminate		
Megalonychidae indet.	Genus and species indeterminate		
Neohipparion	N. eurystyle		Restoration of N. affine
Rhinocerotidae indet.	Genus and species indeterminate		
Plioceros sp.	Species indeterminate	An antilocaprid	
Tayassuidae indet.	Genus and species indeterminate	A peccary.	

== See also ==
- List of fossiliferous stratigraphic units in Mexico
