= Ysidro Formation =

Geologic Formation

- Stratigraphic range: Miocene
- Type: Geologic formation
- Overlies: Bermejo Formation
- Thickness: 500–1,500 feet (150–460 m)

Location
- Region: Baja California
- Country: Mexico

The Ysidro Formation is a geologic formation in Baja California state, northwestern Mexico.

It preserves fossils dating back to the Miocene epoch of the Neogene period.

== See also ==
- Cenozoic Mexico
- List of fossiliferous stratigraphic units in Mexico
