= Tinu Formation =

Geologic formation in Mexico

- Stratigraphic range: Ordovician
- Type: Formation

Location
- Country: Mexico

The Tinu Formation is a geologic formation in Mexico. It preserves fossils dating back to the Ordovician period. The formation is the only fossiliferous lower Palaeozoic unit in northwest Mexico.

== See also ==
- List of fossiliferous stratigraphic units in Mexico
