= Tecomazuchil Formation =

Geologic formation in Mexico

- Stratigraphic range: Callovian
- Type: Geological Formation
- Underlies: Chimeco Limestone
- Overlies: Acatlán Complex

Lithology
- Primary: Silty Sandstone

Location
- Region: Puebla Province
- Country: Mexico

Type section
- Named by: Rafael Pérez-Ibarguengoitia; Antonio Hokuto-Castillo; Alencaster de Cserna

The Tecomazuchil Formation is a geologic formation in Oaxaca, Mexico. It is made up of "a basal conglomerate 135 m thick and predominantly composed of quartz and metamorphic rock fragments, overlain by about 600 m of interbedded tan to red conglomerates, sandstones, and siltstones. The Tecomazuchil Formation overlies unconformably the Acatlán Complex and has been assigned a Middle Jurassic age, though it could represent at least part of the Oxfordian." Fossil Bennettitales have been found in the formation.

== See also ==
- List of fossiliferous stratigraphic units in Mexico
