= Buelna Formation =

Geological formation in Mexico

- Stratigraphic range: Cambrian
- Type: Formation
- Underlies: Cerro Prieto Formation
- Overlies: Proveedora Quartzite

Location
- Country: Mexico

The Buelna Formation is a geological formation in Mexico. It preserves fossils dating back to the Cambrian period.

== See also ==
- List of fossiliferous stratigraphic units in Mexico
