= Ixtaclum Shale =

Geologic formation

- Stratigraphic range: Paleogene
- Type: Formation

Location
- Country: Mexico

The Ixtaclum Shale is a geologic formation in Mexico. It preserves fossils dating back to the Paleogene period.

== See also ==
- List of fossiliferous stratigraphic units in Mexico
