= Puerto Blanco Formation =

Geologic formation in Mexico

- Stratigraphic range: Cambrian
- Type: Formation
- Underlies: Proveedora Quartzite
- Overlies: La Cienega Formation

Location
- Country: Mexico

The Puerto Blanco Formation is a geologic formation in Mexico. It preserves fossils dating back to the Cambrian period.

== See also ==
- List of fossiliferous stratigraphic units in Mexico
