= Conglomerado Cualac =

Geologic formation in Mexico

- Stratigraphic range: Jurassic
- Type: Formation

Location
- Country: Mexico

The Conglomerado Cualac is a geologic formation in Mexico. First described by Guzmán in 1959, under the name Cuarcita Cualac. Later, Erben (1956) gave it their actual name. It consist of thick beds of a hard, white and sometimes yellowish conglomerate with a cuarcitic matrix. This conglomerate compounds almost exclusively of milky quartz pebbles between .5 and 5 centimeters of diameter. It also presents, in less quantity, pebbles of schist, gneiss, and tuff. Its thickness varies between 30 and more than 200 meters. It preserves fossils dating back to the Jurassic period.

== See also ==
- List of fossiliferous stratigraphic units in Mexico

== Sources ==
- Various Contributors to the Paleobiology Database. "Fossilworks: Gateway to the Paleobiology Database".
