= Nielsenoceras =

Nielsenoceras Temporal range: Capitanian

Scientific classification
- Domain: Eukaryota
- Kingdom: Animalia
- Phylum: Mollusca
- Class: Cephalopoda
- Subclass: †Ammonoidea
- Order: †Ceratitida
- Family: †Paraceltitidae
- Genus: †Nielsenoceras; Furnish, 1966

Type species
- Xenaspis skinneri Miller & Furnish, 1940

Species
- See text

Genus of molluscs (fossil)

Nielsenoceras is monotypic Paraceltitid genus of ammonoid from the Middle Permian, Capitanian, that is known from sediments in west Texas. The genus is distinguished by exceptionally broad prongs of the ventral lobe and by the presence of a shallow groove on the outer flanks.

Paraceltitids (family Paraceltitidae) are ceratitid ammonoid cephalopods that lived during the Middle and Late Permian, near the end of the Paleozoic.
