= Potrerillos Formation, Mexico =

Geologic formation in Mexico

Potrerillos Formation
- Stratigraphic range: Maastrichtian-Early Paleocene; ~70–62 Ma
- Type: Formation
- Unit of: Difunta Group
- Sub-units: Upper Mudstone member

Lithology
- Primary: Mudstone
- Other: Grainstone

Location
- Coordinates: 26.0°N 100.8°W
- Approximate paleocoordinates: 31.7°N 82.7°W
- Region: Coahuila
- Country: Mexico
- Potrerillos Formation, Mexico (Mexico)

The Potrerillos Formation is a geologic formation in Mexico. It preserves fossils dating back to the Early Paleocene period.

== Description ==
The Potrerillos Formation was subdivided into five members by McBride (1974), with the second highest, the Upper Mudstone Member. Foraminifera in the lower members indicate a Maastrichtian age, while fossils in the upper members indicate a Paleocene age. Fossil remains are abundant and include transported remains of corals, gastropods, bivalves, shark teeth, and bone fragments.

== Fossil content ==
The following fossils have been reported from the formation:

- Bivalves
  - Venericardia (Baluchicardia) francescae
  - Venericardia sp.
- Cephalopods
  - Cimomia haltomi
  - Elimia cf. trigemmata

== See also ==
- List of fossiliferous stratigraphic units in Mexico
