= Rosarito Beach Formation =

Geological formation in Playas de Rosarito Municipality

- Stratigraphic range: Neogene
- Type: Geological formation

Location
- Region: Baja California
- Country: Mexico

The Rosarito Beach Formation is a geological formation in the Playas de Rosarito Municipality of Baja California state, northwestern Mexico.

It preserves fossils dating back to the Neogene period.

== See also ==
- Neogene Mexico
- List of fossiliferous stratigraphic units in Mexico
