= La Ciénega Formation =

Geologic formation in Mexico

- Stratigraphic range: Carboniferous
- Type: Formation
- Underlies: Puerto Blanco Formation
- Overlies: Tecolote Quartzite

Location
- Country: Mexico

The La Ciénega Formation is a geologic formation in Mexico. It preserves fossils dating back to the Carboniferous period.

== See also ==
- List of fossiliferous stratigraphic units in Mexico
