= Cabrillo Formation =

Geologic formation in San Diego County, California, United States

- Stratigraphic range: Maastrichtian stage, Late Cretaceous Epoch
- Type: Geological formation
- Unit of: Rosario Group
- Overlies: Point Loma Formation

Lithology
- Primary: sandstones, conglomerates

Location
- Region: North America
- Country: United States
- Extent: Point Loma and Mount Soledad, San Diego County; California

Type section
- Named for: Cabrillo National Monument
- Named by: Kennedy and Moore, 1971

The Cabrillo Formation is a Maastrichtian stage geologic formation in coastal San Diego County, southern California. It is part of the Rosario Group. The Maastrichtian stage is of the Late Cretaceous Epoch, during the Mesozoic Era.

The formation is found on the eastern and southwestern sides of the Point Loma peninsula including in Cabrillo National Monument, and on Mount Soledad, both within the city of San Diego.

The Cabrillo Formation overlies the Point Loma Formation.

== Fossils ==
A single tooth from the cartilaginous fish Squalicorax has been recovered from the Cabrillo Formation sediments of Cabrillo National Monument.

== See also ==
- Cretaceous California
- Geology of San Diego County, California
