= El Abra Formation =

Geologic formation in Mexico

- Stratigraphic range: Albian
- Type: Formation

Location
- Region: San Luis Potosí
- Country: Mexico

The El Abra Formation is a geologic formation in Mexico. It preserves fossils dating back to the Cretaceous period.

== See also ==
- List of fossiliferous stratigraphic units in Mexico
