= Simojovel Group =

- Stratigraphic range: Neogene
- Type: Group

Location
- Country: Mexico

The Simojovel Group is a geologic group in Mexico. It preserves fossils dating back to the Neogene period.

== See also ==
- List of fossiliferous stratigraphic units in Mexico
