= Las Encinas Formation =

Geologic formation in Mexico

- Stratigraphic range: Paleogene
- Type: Formation
- Unit of: Difunta Group
- Underlies: Rancho Nuevo Formation
- Overlies: Cerro Grande Formation

Location
- Country: Mexico

The Las Encinas Formation is a geologic formation in Mexico. It preserves fossils dating back to the Paleogene period.

== See also ==
- List of fossiliferous stratigraphic units in Mexico
