= Tacubaya Formation =

Geologic formation in Mexico

- Stratigraphic range: Pleistocene
- Type: Formation

Location
- Region: Aguascalientes
- Country: Mexico

The Tacubaya Formation is a geologic formation in Aguascalientes, Mexico. It preserves fossils dating to the Pleistocene epoch.

== See also ==
- List of fossiliferous stratigraphic units in Mexico
