= Taman Formation =

Geologic formation in Mexico

- Stratigraphic range: Kimmeridgian
- Type: Formation
- Underlies: Pimienta Formation
- Overlies: Zuloaga Formation
- Thickness: Over 150 metres

Lithology
- Primary: Limestone, shale

Location
- Country: Mexico

The Taman Formation is a geologic formation in Mexico. It preserves fossils dating back to the Jurassic period. It was deposited in a "oxic to anoxic (or anoxic-hypersaline), shallow marine environment" The lithology predominantly consists of limestone and shale.

== See also ==
- List of fossiliferous stratigraphic units in Mexico
