= Pimienta Formation =

Geologic formation in Mexico

- Stratigraphic range: Tithonian–Berriasian
- Type: Formation
- Underlies: Lower Tamaulipas Formation
- Overlies: Taman Formation
- Thickness: Over 50 metres

Lithology
- Primary: Limestone, Bentonite, Breccia

Location
- Country: Mexico

The Pimienta Formation is a geologic formation in Mexico. It preserves fossils dating back to the Tithonian-Berriasian. The formation is considered laterally equivalent to the La Casita Formation. The Metriorhynchid Cricosaurus vignaudi is known from the formation.

== See also ==
- List of fossiliferous stratigraphic units in Mexico
