= Represo Formation =

Geologic formation in Mexico

- Stratigraphic range: Carboniferous
- Type: Formation

Location
- Country: Mexico

The Represo Formation is a geologic formation in Mexico. It preserves fossils dating back to the Carboniferous period.

== See also ==
- List of fossiliferous stratigraphic units in Mexico
