= Barranca Group =

- Stratigraphic range: Triassic
- Type: Group

Location
- Country: Mexico

The Barranca Group is a geologic group in Mexico. It preserves fossils dating back to the Triassic period.

== See also ==
- List of fossiliferous stratigraphic units in Mexico
