= Benevides Formation =

Geological formation in Texas and Mexico

- Stratigraphic range: Cretaceous
- Type: Formation

Location
- Region: Texas
- Country: United States; Mexico

The Benevides Formation is a geologic formation in Texas and Mexico. It preserves fossils dating back to the Cretaceous period.

== See also ==
- List of fossiliferous stratigraphic units in Texas
- List of fossiliferous stratigraphic units in Mexico
- Paleontology in Texas
