= Atotonilco El Grande Formation =

Geologic formation in Mexico

- Stratigraphic range: Pliocene
- Type: Geological formation

Location
- Country: Mexico

The Atotonilco El Grande Formation is a geologic formation in Mexico. It preserves fossils dating back to the Neogene period.

== Fossil content ==
=== Mammals ===
Mammals reported from the Atotonilco El Grande Formation
Genus	Species	Presence	Material	Notes	Images
Capreolus	C. constantini	Santa María Amajac.		A deer.	

=== Fish ===
Fish reported from the Atotonilco El Grande Formation
Genus	Species	Presence	Material	Notes	Images
Paleocharacodon	P. guzmanae	Sanctórum-JAO site.	Several specimens.	A splitfin.	

=== Plants ===
Plants reported from the Atotonilco El Grande Formation
Genus	Species	Presence	Material	Notes	Images
Equisetum				Closely related to Equisetum myriochaetum.	

== See also ==
- List of fossiliferous stratigraphic units in Mexico
