= Cabullona Group =

Geologic group in Mexico

- Stratigraphic range: Cretaceous
- Type: Group

Location
- Country: Mexico

The Cabullona Group is a geologic group in Mexico. It preserves fossils dating back to the Cretaceous period.

== See also ==
- List of fossiliferous stratigraphic units in Mexico
