= San Gregorio Formation, Mexico =

Paleogene geologic formation of Mexico

San Gregorio Formation
- Stratigraphic range: Paleogene
- Type: Formation

Location
- Country: Mexico

The San Gregorio Formation is a geologic formation in Mexico. It preserves fossils dating back to the Paleogene period.

== Fossil content ==
Color key: Taxon / Reclassified taxon / Taxon falsely reported as present / Dubious taxon or junior synonym / Ichnotaxon / Ootaxon / Morphotaxon	Notes; Uncertain or tentative taxa are in small text; ~~crossed out~~ taxa are discredited.

=== Cetaceans ===
Cetaceans of the San Gregorio Formation
Genus	Species	Location	Stratigraphic position	Material	Notes	Images
Cochimicetus	C. convexus				A eomysticetid cetacean	

== See also ==
- List of fossiliferous stratigraphic units in Mexico
