= Carbonera Formation, Mexico =

Geologic formation in Mexico

Carbonera Formation
- Stratigraphic range: Berriasian-Hauterivian; ~145–125 Ma
- Type: Formation

Lithology
- Primary: Sandstone, shale

Location
- Coordinates: 24.2°N 102.8°W
- Approximate paleocoordinates: 20.9°N 55.2°W
- Region: Durango
- Country: Mexico
- Carbonera Formation, Mexico (Mexico) Carbonera Formation, Mexico (Durango)

The Carbonera Formation is a geologic formation in Mexico. It preserves fossils dating back to the Berriasian to Hauterivian stages of the Early Cretaceous period.

== Fossil content ==
The following fossils were reported from the formation:

Ammonites

- Maderia casitensis
- Mexicanoceras laticostatum
- M. multicostatum
- ?Hemihoplites mexicanus
- cf. Phylloceras serum
- Distoloceras sp.

Bivalves

- Exogyra reedi
- Plicatula pulchra
- Gryphaea sp.

Gastropods

- Vermetus cornejoi
- Pleurotomaria sp.

Brachiopods

- Ptilorhynchia (Proteorhynchia) durangensis

Corals

- Paretallonia hispaniensis

== See also ==
- List of fossiliferous stratigraphic units in Mexico
