= El Gallo Formation =

Geological formation in Mexico

- Stratigraphic range: Santonian–Maastrichtian
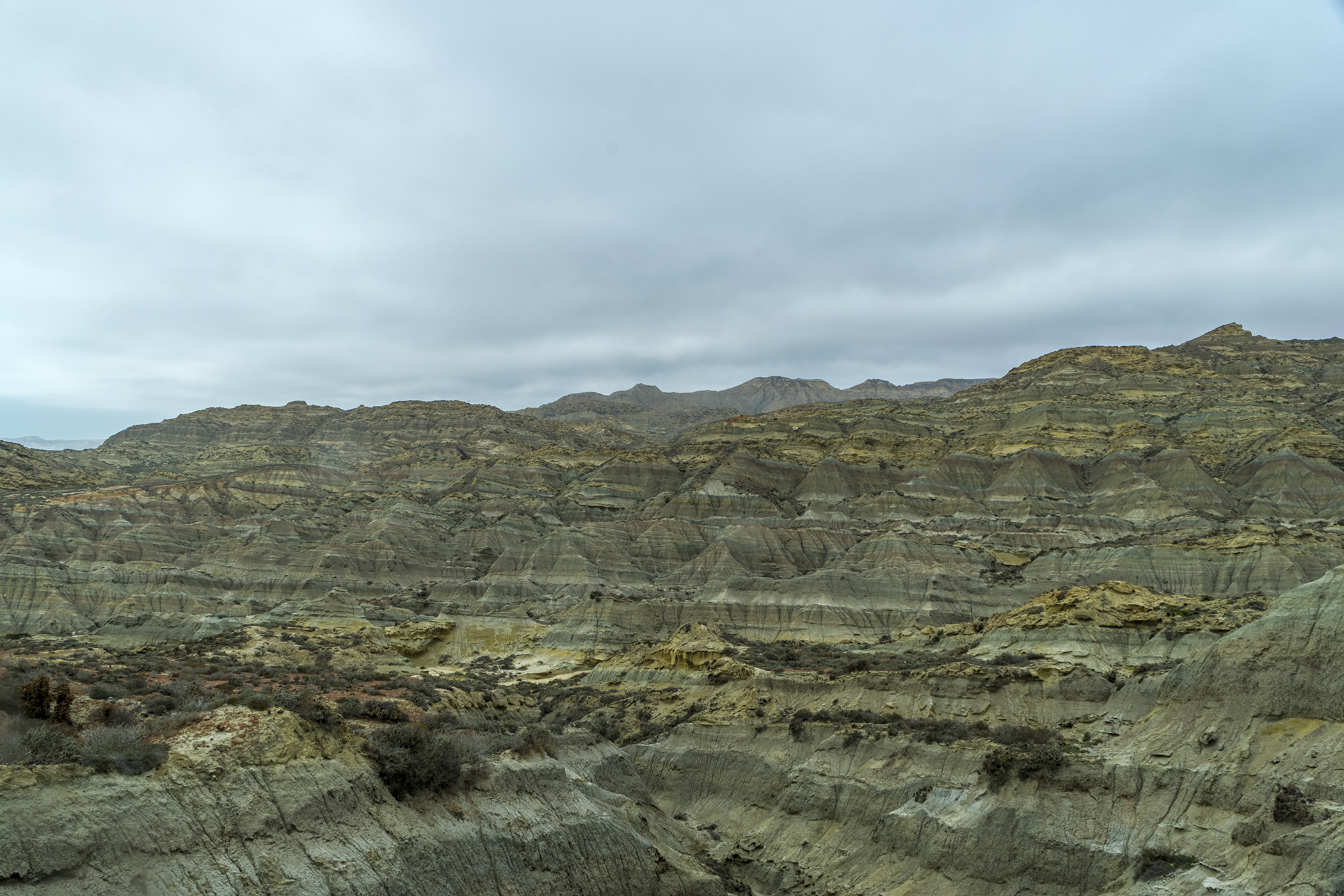
- Afloramiento de la formación El Gallo
- Type: Geological formation
- Sub-units: El Disecado Member
- Thickness: up to ca. 1,150 m (3,770 ft) (El Disecado Member)

Lithology
- Primary: Mudstone, sandstone
- Other: Siltstone

Location
- Coordinates: 30.1°N 115.8°W
- Approximate paleocoordinates: 35.5°N 85.8°W
- Region: Baja California
- Country: Mexico
- El Gallo Formation (Mexico)

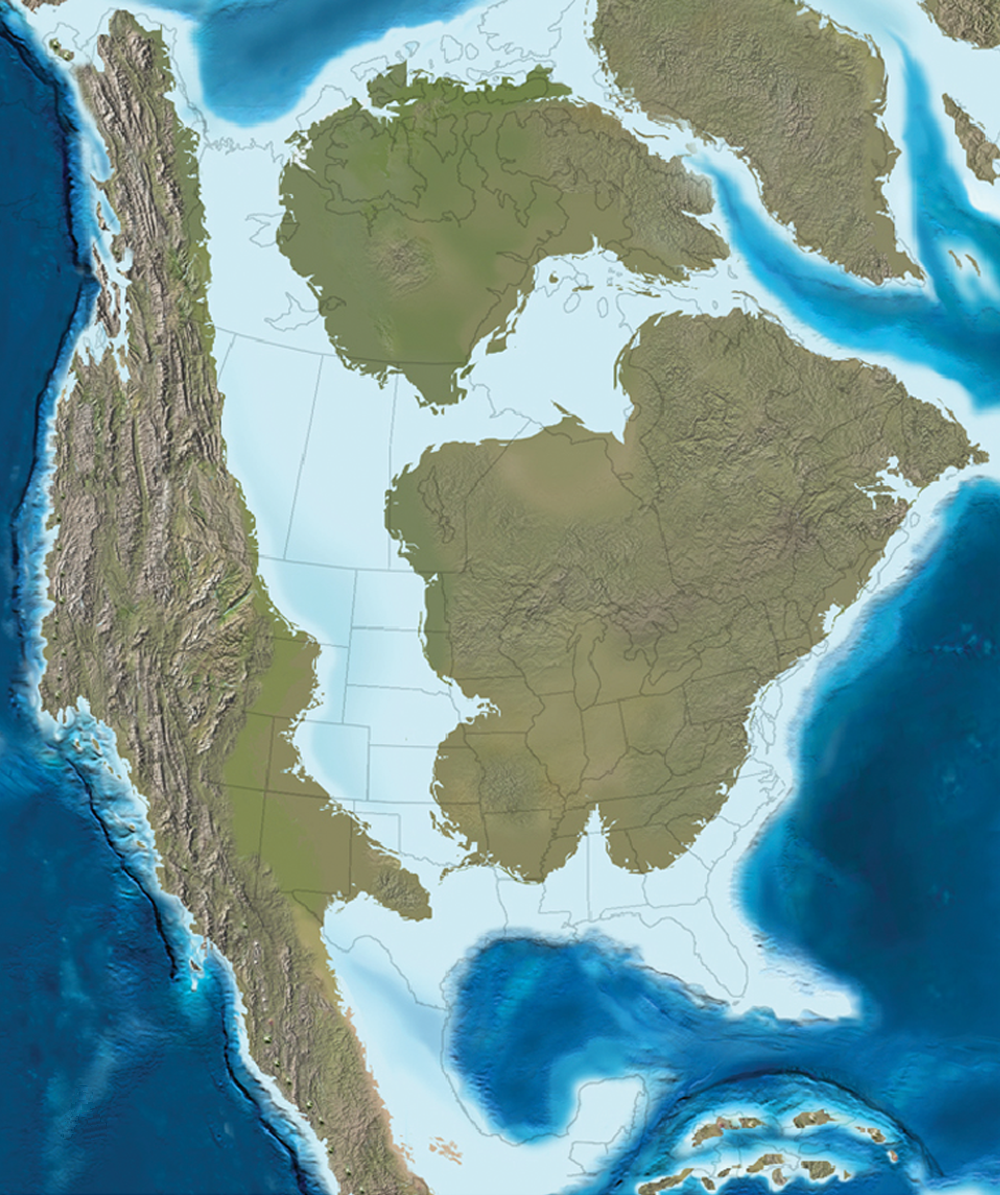
Paleogeography of the Campanian, showcasing what North America was like during the time range the formation spans

The El Gallo Formation is a geological formation in Mexico whose strata date back to the Late Cretaceous, from the Santonian to the Maastrichtian. Dinosaur remains are among the fossils that have been recovered from the formation.

== Vertebrate paleofauna ==
=== Crurotarsans ===
Crurotarsans of the El Gallo Formation
Genus	Species	Location	Member	Abundance	Notes	Images
Brachychampsa						
Leidyosuchus						

=== Dinosaurs ===
Indeterminate theropod, coelurosaur, dromaeosaurid, tyrannosaurid, hadrosaurid, and ankylosaurid remains are known from the formation. Dinosaur eggs are known from the formation. Alexornis antecedens actually comes from the La Bocana Roja Formation. An indeterminate hadrosaurine is known from the formation. Potential Hypacrosaurus remains have been unearthed here.

Dinosaurs of the El Gallo Formation
Genus	Species	Location	Member	Abundance	Notes	Images
cf. Chirostenotes	C. sp.					
Gryposaurus	Indeterminate					
Lambeosaurus	L. laticaudus					
Magnapaulia	M. laticaudus	El Rosario site	El Disecado	A partial skeleton	A large lambeosaur	
Saurornitholestinae	Indeterminate					
cf. Troodon	T. formosus					
Tyrannosauridae	Indeterminate				Possibly represents a new taxon.	
Maniraptora	Maniraptora indet.					
Troodontidae	Troodontidae indet.					
Dromaeosauridae	Dromaeosauridae indet.					
Theropoda	Theropoda indet.					

=== Lepidosaurs ===
The diversity of lepidosaurs in El Gallo formation is scarce. However, the Polyglyphanodontian Dicothon bajaensis is by far the lizard with an important fossil record for this formation.

Lepidosaurs of the El Gallo Formation
Genus	Species	Location	Member	Abundance	Notes	Images
Dicothodon	bajaensis					
Paraglyphanodon	Indeterminate				Probably a juvenile Polyglyphanodon.	

=== Mammals ===
Mammals of the El Gallo Formation
Genus	Species	Location	Stratigraphic position	Abundance	Notes	Images
Cimolodon	C. desosai					
Mesodma	M. formosa					
Pediomys	Indeterminate					
Stygimys	Indeterminate					

=== Amphibians ===
An indeterminate albanerpetontid is known from the formation.

== See also ==
- List of dinosaur-bearing rock formations
- List of fossiliferous stratigraphic units in Mexico
