= Difunta Group =

- Stratigraphic range: Campanian–Paleocene
- Type: Group
- Sub-units: Rancho Nuevo Formation; Las Encinas Formation; Cerro Grande Formation; Las Imágenes Formation; Cañón del Tule Formation; Cerro Huerta Formation; Cerro del Pueblo Formation
- Overlies: Parras Shale
- Thickness: 4000 m

Location
- Country: Mexico

The Difunta Group is a geologic group in Mexico. It preserves fossils dating back to the Cretaceous period.

== See also ==
- List of fossiliferous stratigraphic units in Mexico
