= San Juan Formation, Mexico =

Geologic formation in Mexico

San Juan Formation
- Stratigraphic range: Lutetian
- Type: Formation
- Unit of: La Esperanza Group

Lithology
- Primary: Limestone

Location
- Coordinates: 16.7°N 93.1°W
- Approximate paleocoordinates: 18.5°N 83.8°W
- Region: Chiapas
- Country: Mexico

The San Juan Formation is a geologic formation in Mexico. It preserves fossil corals dating back to the Lutetian stage of the Paleogene period.

== See also ==
- List of fossiliferous stratigraphic units in Mexico
