= Cochimicetus =

Cochimicetus Temporal range: Oligocene

Scientific classification
- Kingdom: Animalia
- Phylum: Chordata
- Class: Mammalia
- Infraclass: Placentalia
- Order: Artiodactyla
- Infraorder: Cetacea
- Family: †Eomysticetidae
- Genus: †Cochimicetus
- Species: †C. convexus

Binomial name
- †Cochimicetus convexus Cedillo-Avila et al., 2025

Extinct genus of cetaceans

Cochimicetus is an extinct genus of eomysticetid that inhabited the shores of what is now Mexico during the Oligocene epoch. A monotypic genus, it contains the species C. convexus.
