= Aurora Limestone =

Geologic formation in Mexico

- Stratigraphic range: Albian Early Cretaceous
- Type: Formation
- Unit of: Chihuahuan Basin
- Underlies: Cuchillo Formation
- Overlies: Benavides Formation
- Thickness: 128 - 1500 m.

Lithology
- Primary: Limestone
- Other: Shale

Location
- Region: South North America
- Country: Mexico

Type section
- Named for: Aurora Mine
- Named by: R.H. Burrows

The Aurora Limestone is a geologic formation in Mexico. It preserves fossils dating back to the Cretaceous period.

== Vertebrate paleofauna ==
- Hadrosauridae indet.

== Invertebrate paleofauna ==
- Orbitolina texana
- Dicyclina schlumbergeri
- Dictyoconus sp.
- Oxytropidoceras sp.
- Lunatia sp.
- Colomiella recta
- Colomiella mexicana
- Enallaster cf. bravoensis
- Ostrea carinata
- Pithonella ovalis
- Stomiosphera sphaerica
- Calcispherula walnutensis

== See also ==
- List of fossiliferous stratigraphic units in Mexico
