= Rosario Group =

Geologic group in California, United States and Baja California, Mexico

- Stratigraphic range: Late Cretaceous
- Type: Group
- Sub-units: Lusardi Formation; Cabrillo Formation; Point Loma Formation
- Underlies: Tertiary andesites, Quaternary deposits
- Overlies: Mesozoic volcanic rocks
- Thickness: 1,200 m (3,900 ft)

Lithology
- Primary: Marine mudstones, sandstones, conglomerates

Location
- Region: Baja California, California
- Country: Mexico, United States

Type section
- Named for: El Rosario, Baja California

The Rosario Group is a Late Cretaceous geologic group in southwestern California (United States) and northwestern Baja California (Mexico). In older literature it was named Rosario Formation.

The Cretaceous aged formations of the Rosario Group include the Point Loma Formation, Cabrillo Formation and Lusardi Formation, in ascending order.

The sedimentary structures of the Rosario Group apparently were formed in a nearshore shelf environment, probably a local embayment.

== Fossils ==
Some incomplete dinosaur fossils have been discovered in the Point Loma Formation dating back to the Cretaceous period of the Mesozoic Era.

== See also ==
- Geology of San Diego County, California
- List of fossiliferous stratigraphic units in California
