= Río Sabinal Group =

Geologic group in Mexico

- Stratigraphic range: Paleogene
- Type: Group

Location
- Country: Mexico

The Río Sabinal Group is a geologic group in Mexico. It preserves fossils dating back to the Paleogene period.

== See also ==
- List of fossiliferous stratigraphic units in Mexico
