= Cantaure Formation, Mexico =

Neogene geologic formation of Mexico

Cantaure Formation
- Stratigraphic range: Neogene
- Type: Formation

Location
- Country: Mexico

The Cantaure Formation is a geologic formation in Mexico. It preserves fossils dating back to the Neogene period.

== See also ==
- List of fossiliferous stratigraphic units in Mexico
