= La Esperanza Group =

Mexican geologic preservation group

- Stratigraphic range: Paleogene
- Type: Group

Location
- Country: Mexico

The La Esperanza Group is a geologic group in Mexico. It preserves fossils dating back to the Paleogene period.

== See also ==
- List of fossiliferous stratigraphic units in Mexico
