= Santa Ana Formation, Mexico =

Geological formation in Mexico

Santa Ana Formation
- Stratigraphic range: Neogene
- Type: Formation

Location
- Country: Mexico

The Santa Ana Formation is a geologic formation in Mexico. It preserves fossils dating back to the Neogene period.

== See also ==
- List of fossiliferous stratigraphic units in Mexico
