= Lomas Coloradas Formation =

- Stratigraphic range: Maastrichtian
- Type: Geological formation

Location
- Country: Mexico

The Lomas Coloradas Formation is a Mesozoic geologic formation in Mexico. Dinosaur remains are among the fossils that have been recovered from the formation, although only a few have yet been referred to a specific genus. Indeterminate hadrosaur remains, indeterminate ceratopsian remains, indeterminate tyrannosaur remains, indeterminate maniraptoriform remains, and indeterminate sauropod remains, most likely belonging to Alamosaurus, have been unearthed here.

== Dinosaurs ==
Dinosaurs reported from the Lomas Coloradas Formation
Genus	Species	Location	Stratigraphic Position	Material	Notes	Images
Tyrannosaurus?	T. rex?				A tyrannosaurid. Also from the Hell Creek, Denver, Ferris, Frenchman, Javelina, Livingston, McRae, North Horn, Scollard, and Willow Creek Formations.	

== See also ==
- List of dinosaur-bearing rock formations
  - List of stratigraphic units with indeterminate dinosaur fossils
