= Ocozocoautla Formation =

Geologic formation

- Stratigraphic range: Cretaceous
- Type: Formation

Location
- Country: Mexico

The Ocozocoautla Formation is a geologic formation in Mexico. It preserves fossils dating back to the Cretaceous period.

== See also ==
- List of fossiliferous stratigraphic units in Mexico
