= La Difunta Formation =

Permian-aged geologic formation in Mexico

- Stratigraphic range: Permian
- Type: Formation

Location
- Country: Mexico

The La Difunta Formation is a geologic formation in Mexico. It preserves fossils dating back to the Permian period.

== See also ==
- List of fossiliferous stratigraphic units in Mexico
