= San Juan Raya Formation =

Geologic formation in Mexico

- Stratigraphic range: Late Valanginian-Early Hauterivian
- Type: Formation

Lithology
- Primary: Shale
- Other: Mudstone, sandstone

Location
- Coordinates: 18.4°N 97.7°W
- Approximate paleocoordinates: 16.9°N 54.9°W
- Region: Puebla
- Country: Mexico
- San Juan Raya Formation (Mexico)

The San Juan Raya Formation is a geologic formation in Mexico. It dates back to late Valanginian to early Hauterivian stages of the Early Cretaceous period, based on nannoplankton fossils. Presence of calcareous nannoplankton and ammonites represent paleoenviornment of this formation represents outer platform environment. Footprints of a sauropod and two types of theropods have been reported.

== See also ==
- List of fossiliferous stratigraphic units in Mexico
