= Lechería Limestone =

Geological formation in Chiapas, Mexico

- Stratigraphic range: Ypresian (Wasatchian-Bridgerian); ~55–48 Ma
- Type: Formation
- Unit of: Río Sabina Group

Lithology
- Primary: Limestone

Location
- Coordinates: 16.9°N 92.9°W
- Approximate paleocoordinates: 19.8°N 81.0°W
- Region: Chiapas
- Country: Mexico

Type section
- Named for: Lechería River
- Lechería Limestone (Mexico)

The Lechería Limestone is a geologic formation in Chiapas, Mexico. The shallow reefal biomicrite and mud-supported oolitic and pelletoidal biosparite limestones preserve fossils dating back to the Paleogene period.

== See also ==
- List of fossiliferous stratigraphic units in Mexico
- Klondike Mountain Formation
- Nanjemoy Formation
- Bogotá Formation
