= Bateque Formation =

Geologic formation in Mexico

- Stratigraphic range: Paleogene
- Type: Formation

Location
- Country: Mexico

The Bateque Formation is a geologic formation in Mexico. It preserves fossils dating back to the Paleogene period.

== See also ==
- List of fossiliferous stratigraphic units in Mexico
