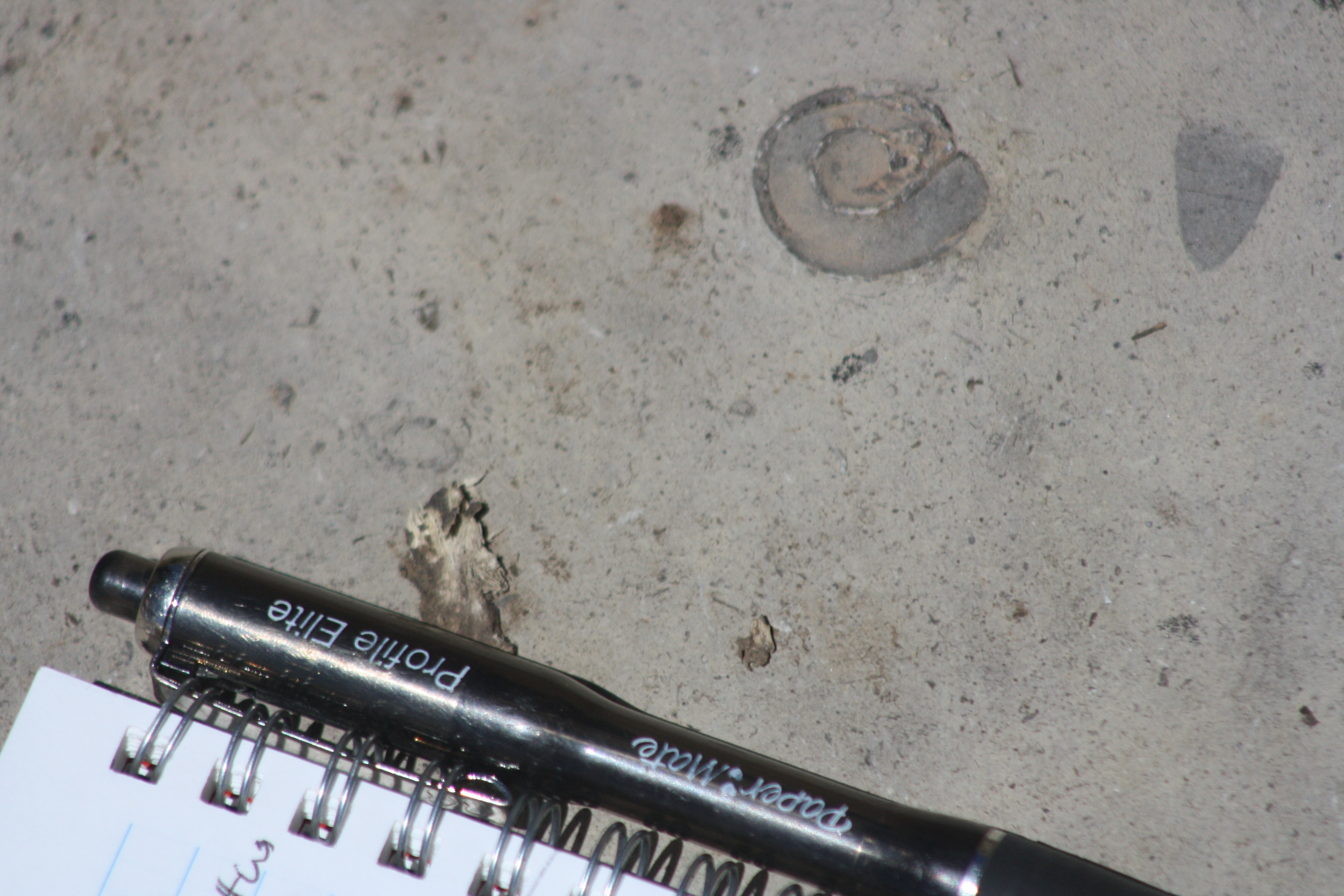
- Paraceltites fossil in situ in the Delaware Formation of the Guadalupe Mountains National Park.

Scientific classification
- Domain: Eukaryota
- Kingdom: Animalia
- Phylum: Mollusca
- Class: Cephalopoda
- Subclass: †Ammonoidea
- Order: †Ceratitida
- Family: †Paraceltitidae
- Genus: †Paraceltites; Gemmellaro, 1887

Species
- See text

= Paraceltites =

Paraceltites Temporal range: Middle Permian–Upper Permian

Genus of molluscs (fossil)

Paraceltites is a genus of ammonoid cephalopods in the ceratitid family Paraceltitidae, known from the Middle and Upper Permian of Sicily, the Alps, Crimea, Texas and Mexico. The shell of Paraceltities is evolute with whorls compressed, venter arched and smooth, sides bearing ribs that slant somewhat forward dorso-ventrally. The suture is simple and goniatitic.

Paraceltities was named by Gemmellaro, 1887. The type species is Paraceltities hoeferi.
