= List of the prehistoric life of Connecticut =

This list of the prehistoric life of Connecticut contains the various prehistoric life-forms whose fossilized remains have been reported from within the US state of Connecticut.

== Precambrian-Paleozoic ==
The Paleobiology Database records no known occurrences of Precambrian or Paleozoic fossils in Connecticut.

== Mesozoic ==
- †Acanthichnus
  - †Acanthichnus cursorius
- †Anchisauripus
  - †Anchisauripus exsertus
  - †Anchisauripus giganteus – type locality for species
  - †Anchisauripus hitchcocki
  - †Anchisauripus parallelus
  - †Anchisauripus sillimani
  - †Anchisauripus tuberosus
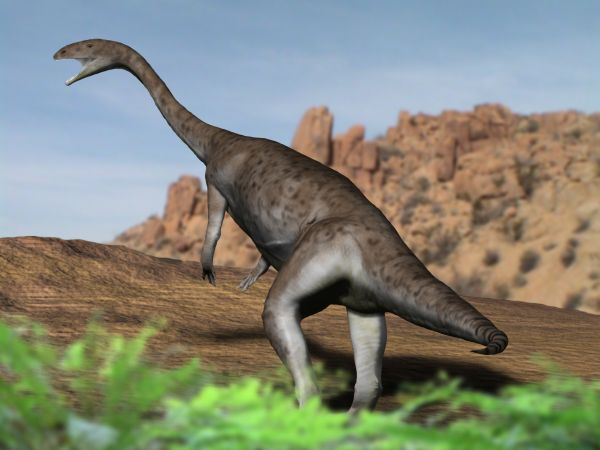
- Restoration of the Early Jurassic sauropodomorph dinosaur Anchisaurus
  †Anchisaurus
  - †Anchisaurus polyzelus – type locality for species
- †Ancyropus – type locality for genus
  - †Ancyropus heteroclitus – type locality for species
- †Anomoepus
  - †Anomoepus curvatus
  - †Anomoepus gracillimus
  - †Anomoepus intermedius
- †Argoides
  - †Argoides macrodactylus – type locality for species
  - †Argoides minimus – type locality for species
- †Baiera
- †Batrachopus
  - †Batrachopus barrattii
  - †Batrachopus deweyi
  - †Batrachopus dispar
  - †Batrachopus gracilis
- †Belodon
  - †Belodon validus – type locality for species
- †Bisulcus
- Botryopera
- †Brontozoum
  - †Brontozoum divaricatum
  - †Brontozoum giganteum
  - †Brontozoum isodactylum
  - †Brontozoum sillimanium
- †Cochlichnus
- †Coelophysis
- †Conopsoides
  - †Conopsoides larvalis
- †Corvipes
  - †Corvipes lacertoideus
- †Cunichoides
  - †Cunichoides marsupialoideus – type locality for species
- †Cunicularius
  - †Cunicularius retrahens
- †Erpetosuchus
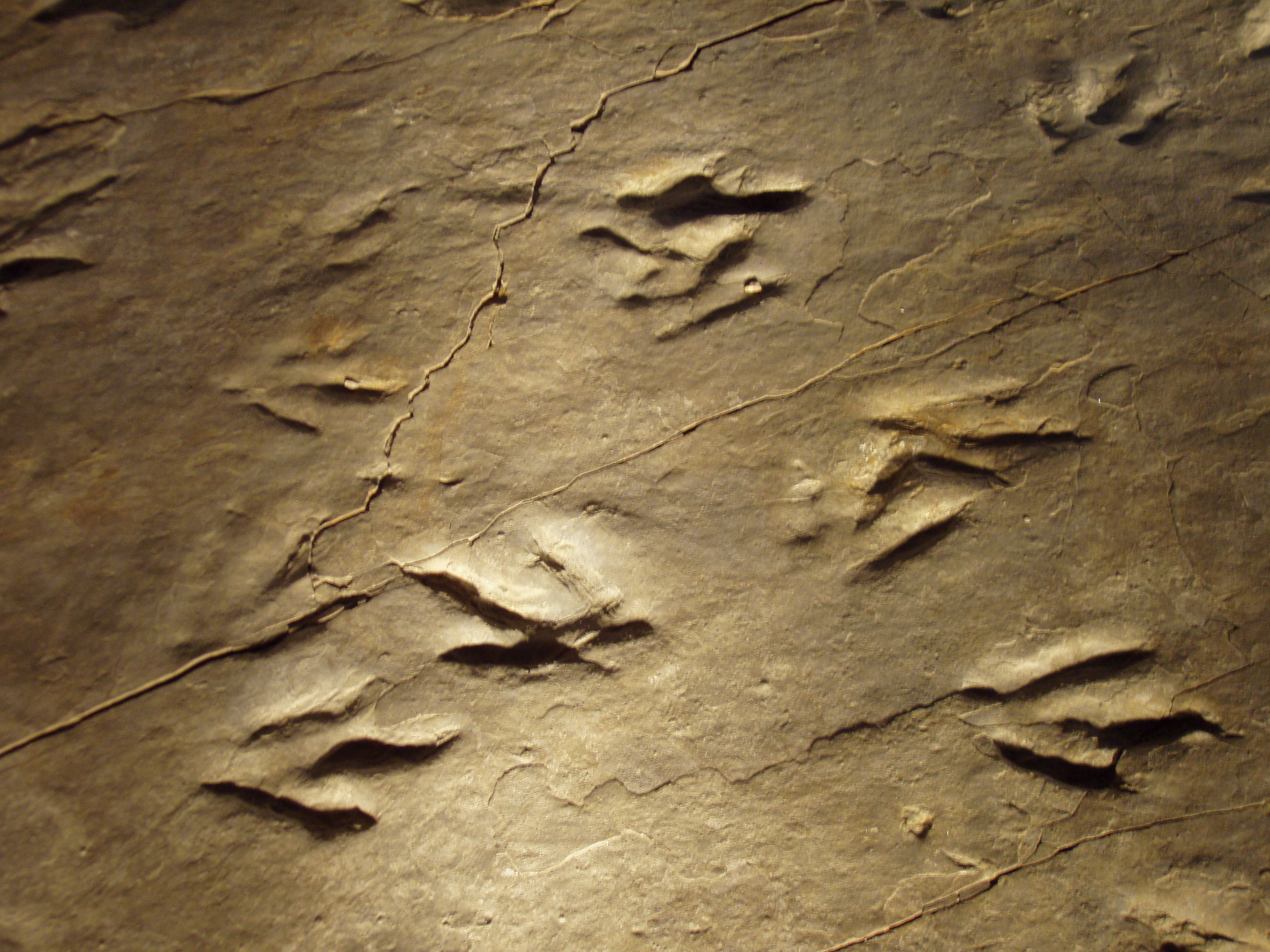
- Fossil Eubrontes tracks. Eubrontes is the Connecticut state fossil.
  †Eubrontes
  - †Eubrontes approximatus
  - †Eubrontes dananus – type locality for species
  - †Eubrontes divaricatus
  - †Eubrontes giganteus
- †Gigandipus
  - †Gigandipus caudatus
- †Grallator
  - †Grallator cuneatus
  - †Grallator cursorius
  - †Grallator formosus
  - †Grallator magnificus
  - †Grallator tenuis
- †Harpedactylus
  - †Harpedactylus tenuissimus – type locality for species
- †Herpystezoum
  - †Herpystezoum minutus
- †Holcoptera
  - †Holcoptera giebeli
- †Hoplichnus
  - †Hoplichnus equus
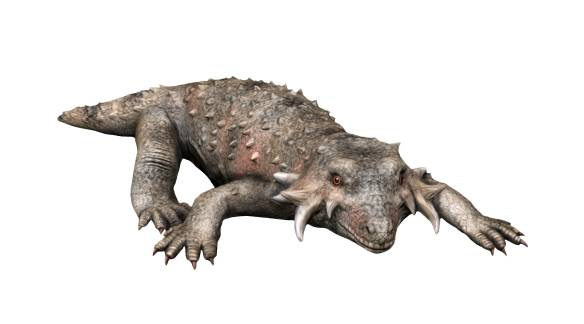
- Life restoration of Hypsognathus.
  †Hypsognathus
  - †Hypsognathus fenneri
- †Isocampe
  - †Isocampe strata
- †Loperia
- †Mormolucoides
  - †Mormolucoides articulatus
- †Ornithoidichnites
  - †Ornithoidichnites gracillior – type locality for species
  - †Ornithoidichnites sillimani – type locality for species
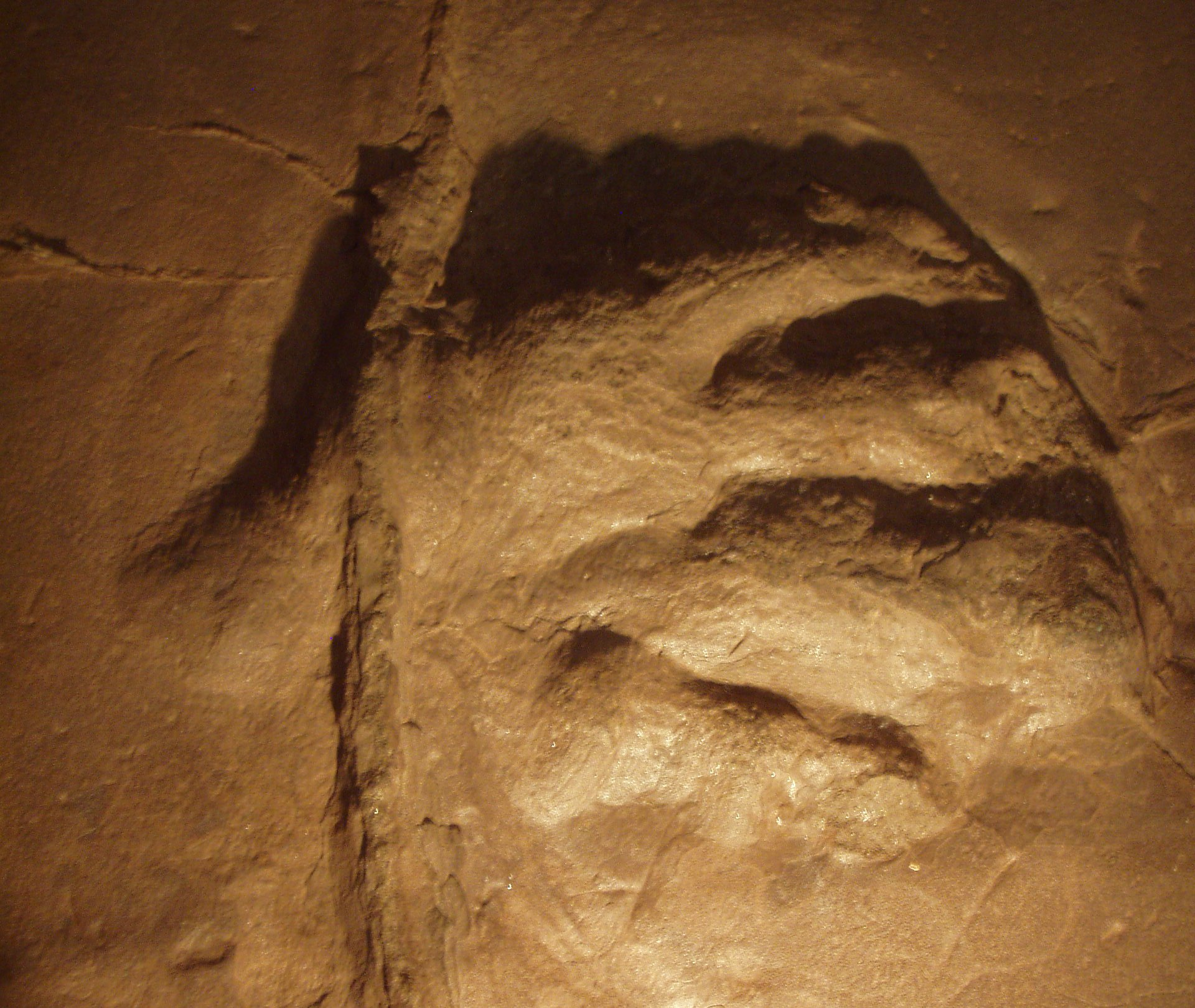
- Fossil from Dinosaur State Park and Arboretum of the Late Triassic-Middle Jurassic sauropodomorph dinosaur footprint ichnogenus Otozoum
  †Otozoum
  - †Otozoum moodii
- †Palamopus
  - †Palamopus divaricans
- †Platypterna
  - †Platypterna deanii – type locality for species
  - †Platypterna delicatula – type locality for species
  - †Platypterna tenuis – type locality for species
- †Plectropterna
  - †Plectropterna gracilis
  - †Plectropterna lineans
  - †Plectropterna minitans
- †Plectropus
  - †Plectropus longipes
- †Plesiornis
- †Redfieldius
  - †Redfieldius gracilis
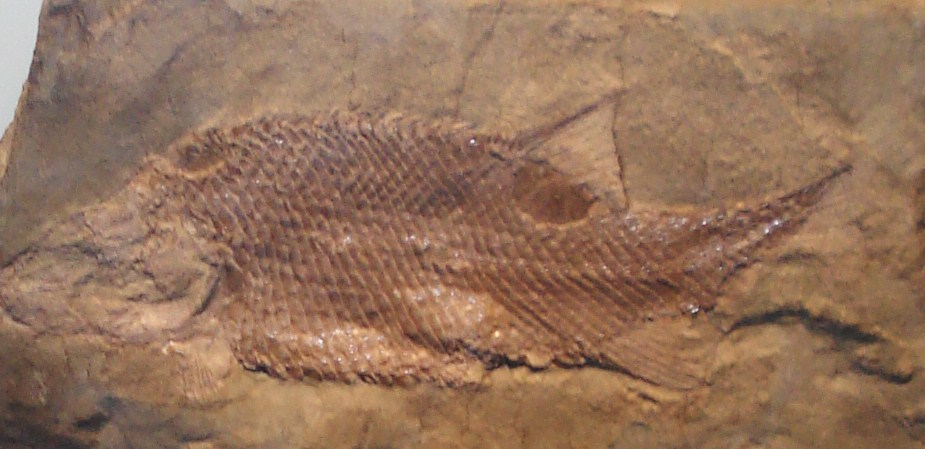
- Fossilized skeleton of the Late Triassic-Early Jurassic bony fish Semionotus
  †Semionotus
  - †Semionotus agassizi
  - †Semionotus tenuiceps
- †Sillimanius
  - †Sillimanius gracilior – type locality for species
  - †Sillimanius tetradactylus – type locality for species
- †Stegomus – type locality for genus
  - †Stegomus arcuatus – type locality for species
- †Steropoides
  - †Steropoides divaricatus
  - †Steropoides diversus
  - †Steropoides infelix
  - †Steropoides loripes
- †Tarsoplectrus
  - †Tarsoplectrus elegans – type locality for species
- †Triaenopus
  - †Triaenopus baileyanus – type locality for species
  - †Triaenopus lulli – type locality for species
- †Trihamus
  - †Trihamus elegans
  - †Trihamus magnus
- †Typopus
  - †Typopus gracilis – type locality for species

== Cenozoic ==
The Paleobiology Database records no known occurrences of Cenozoic fossils in Connecticut.
