= Jangdong Formation =

Geologic formation in South Korea

- Stratigraphic range: latest Cenomanian-earliest Turonian; 94 Ma
- Geological map (a), Columnar section (b), Photographs of Hwasun Seoyuri Tracksite (c), and Pterosaur track-bearing horizon (d)
- Type: Geological formation
- Underlies: Yeonhwari Formation(North) Jeokbyeok Formation(South)
- Overlies: Manwolsan Tuff
- Thickness: Up to 800m

Lithology
- Primary: Mudstone, Sandstone
- Other: Tuff

Location
- Coordinates: 35.10°N 127.05°E
- Region: South Jeolla Province
- Country: South Korea

Type section
- Named for: Jangdong, Hwasun
- Named by: Kim and Park, 1966
- Jangdong Formation (South Korea)

The Jangdong Formation (Jangdong Tuff in some older literatures; Korean: 장동층; Hanja: 壯東層) is an Upper Cretaceous geologic formation in South Korea. It is part of the Neungju Basin, one of the nonmarine sedimentary basins formed in South Korea during the Cretaceous period. Over 1,500 dinosaur tracks have been discovered from the Hwasun Seoyuri Tracksite, which is part of the formation and designated as a Natural Monument of the Republic of Korea.

== Geology ==
Among the Cretaceous sediments of the Neungju Basin, the Jangdong Formation is predominantly composed of silty mudstones and fine sandstones interbedded with pyroclastic materials, representing active volcanism in this area.

The Jangdong Formation shows lithological variety depending on the region. The lithology of the southern part of the formation is mainly composed of conglomerates, sandstones, silty mudstones, and pyroclastic breccia, and the facies association suggests an alluvial plain setting for this area. Whereas the lithology of the central and northern part of the formation is composed mainly of fine-grained sandstone to mudstone and dark gray siltstone to mudstone, with sedimentary features including mudcracks, ripples, evaporite casts and dinosaur tracks, and the facies association suggests a marginal playa lake setting of this area.

The age of the Jangdong Formation was initially suggested as latest Late Cretaceous (71-66 MA) based on K-Ar geochronology for volcanic clasts in the formation, but U-Pb ages from the Manwolsan Tuff which underlies the Jangdong Formation, and tuff bed in the middle of the Jangdong Formation shows 96 Ma and 94 Ma, indicating the age of the Jangdong Formation dates back to the boundary of Cenomanian-Turonian.

== Fossil records ==
Aside from diverse dinosaur and pterosaur tracks, and invertebrate traces associated with pterosaur tracks, a few carbonized wood and spinicaudata fossils have been found.

=== Dinosaur and pterosaur tracks ===
Among 1,500 dinosaur footprints from 5 horizons at the Hwasun Seoyuri Tracksite, over 60 trackways made by theropods, sauropods, and ornithopods have been identified. Unlike other tracksites in Korea, nearly 88% of the tracks at this site are made by theropods. The lack of bird footprints from the site possibly shows regional dominance of pterosaurs in this area.

Genus	Species	Location	Stratigraphic position	Material	Notes	Images
cf. Magnoavipes	cf. M. isp.	Hwasun Seoyuri Tracksite			16-22 cm long. Has wide digit diversification (80–90°). Slipped footprints and a trackway showing acceleration have been reported in the L1 horizon.	
Theropod type B	indeterminate	Hwasun Seoyuri Tracksite			20-28 cm long. Has wide digit diversification (50–60°). Similar to Ornithomimipus and Xiangxipus	
Theropod type C	indeterminate	Hwasun Seoyuri Tracksite			40-55 cm long. Has wide digit diversification (50°).	
Ornithopodichnus	O. isp.	Hwasun Seoyuri Tracksite	L2 and L4 horizons		12~80 cm long. Several trackways by small trackmakers in L2 show possible gregarious behavior.	
cf. Brontopodus	cf. B. isp.	Hwasun Seoyuri Tracksite	L1, L4 and L5 horizons		Pes-only trackway from L4 present, which represents manus tracks that were overprinted by the pes.	
Pteraichnus	P. isp.	Hwasun Seoyuri Tracksite	At least from three different horizons, all at least 20 meters above the L5 horizon.	362 footprints	Different tracks attributed to various trackmakers, including dsungaripteroids, and small or juvenile azhdarchids or yet-to-be-reported group of pterosaurs.	

== See also ==
- List of dinosaur-bearing rock formations
