= La Matilde Formation =

Jurassic geological formation

- Stratigraphic range: Bathonian-Kimmeridgian; ~167–151 Ma
- Type: Geological formation
- Underlies: San Julián Formation
- Overlies: Chon Aike Formation

Lithology
- Primary: Claystone, sandstone, siltstone
- Other: Coal beds, conglomerate, tuff

Location
- Location: Patagonia
- Coordinates: 47.6°S 68.1°W
- Approximate paleocoordinates: 44.2°S 27.3°W
- Region: Santa Cruz Province
- Country: Argentina
- Extent: Austral Basin
- La Matilde Formation (Argentina)

La Matilde Formation is a Jurassic geological formation in the Austral Basin of Santa Cruz Province, Patagonia, Argentina. It is dated to the Middle to Late Jurassic. From the Bathonian age (164.7 to 167.7 million years ago) to the Kimmeridgian age (150.8 to 155.7 million years ago) at the latest.

The area was once part of the subtropical and temperate regions of the southern supercontinent Gondwana in the Mesozoic era, a more or less continuous landmass consisting of what is now modern South America, Africa, Antarctica, Australia, New Zealand, and New Guinea.

== Description ==
La Matilde consists primarily of sedimentary rocks. It includes claystone, coal beds, conglomerates, siltstones, sandstones, and volcanic tuff. La Matilde overlies but sometimes intersperses with the Middle Jurassic Chon Aike Formation. The two formations are the subunits of the Bahía Laura Group.

== Fossil content ==
La Matilde is known for the abundant fossils recovered from it. Notable fossil localities in the formation include the Cerro Cuadrado Petrified Forest, the Cerro Madre e Hija Petrified Forest, and the remains and trace fossils (including trackways) of dinosaurs in the Laguna Manantiales Farm.

Fossil taxa recovered from the La Matilde Formation include:

Flora

- Agathoxylon matildense
- Araucaria mirabilis
- Araucarites sanctaecrucis
- Brachyphyllum
- Equisetum thermale
- Hermatomycesporites patagonicus
- Pararaucaria patagonica

Ichnofossils

- Ameghinichnus patagonicus
- Casamiquelichnus navesorum
- Delatorrichnus goyenechei
- Grallator
- Notobatrachus degiustoi
- Sarmientichnus scagliai
- Wildeichnus navesi

== See also ==
- List of stratigraphic units with theropod tracks
- List of fossil sites
