= Sousa Formation =

Geologic formation in Brazil

- Stratigraphic range: Berriasian-Hauterivian
- Type: Geological formation
- Unit of: Rio do Peixe Group
- Underlies: Rio Piranhas Formation
- Overlies: Antenor Navarro Formation

Lithology
- Primary: Siltstone
- Other: Sandstone

Location
- Coordinates: 6.8°S 38.2°W
- Approximate paleocoordinates: 4.5°S 5.3°W
- Region: Paraíba
- Country: Brazil
- Extent: Rio do Peixe Basin
- Sousa Formation (Brazil)

The Sousa Formation is a Berriasian-Hauterivian geologic formation in Paraíba, Brazil. Fossil sauropod tracks have been reported from the formation.

== Ichnofossils ==
Among others, these ichnofossils have been reported from the formation:

- Carnosauria indet.
- Coelurosauria indet.
- Moraesichnium barbarenae
- Sousaichnium pricei
- Sousatitanosauripus robsoni.
- Staurichnium diogenis

== See also ==
- List of dinosaur-bearing rock formations
  - List of stratigraphic units with sauropodomorph tracks
    - Sauropod tracks
