= Patuxent Formation =

Cretaceous geologic formation of the Atlantic coastal plain

- Stratigraphic range: Aptian
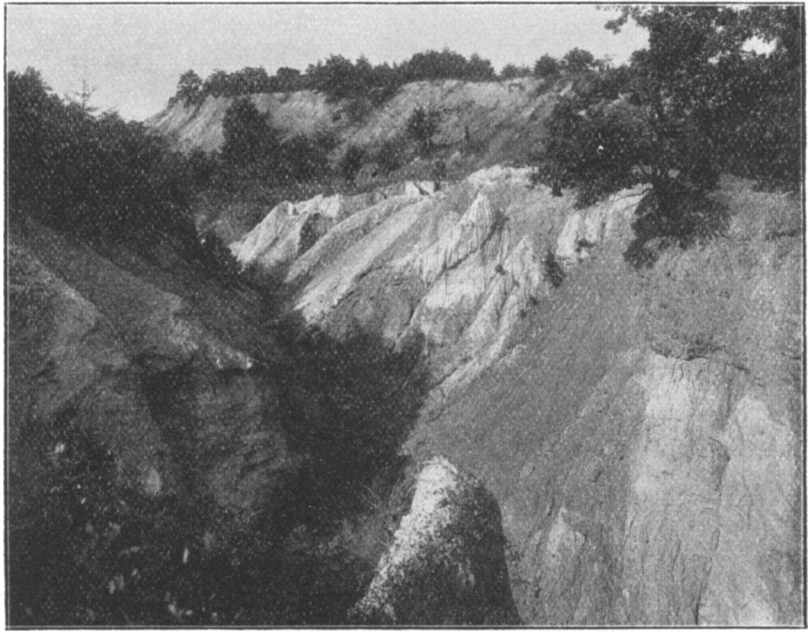
- . View at School House Hill, Baltimore County, Maryland showing the Patuxent Formation overlain by the Arundel Formation
- Type: Sedimentary
- Unit of: Potomac Group
- Underlies: Arundel Formation
- Overlies: Basement
- Thickness: up to 250 feet (80 m)

Lithology
- Primary: Sandstone, claystone, gravel
- Other: Siderite

Location
- Region: Atlantic coastal plain
- Country: United States
- Extent: Maryland, Washington D. C., Delaware, Virginia

Type section
- Named for: Patuxent River
- Named by: W. B. Clark, 1897

The Patuxent Formation is an Early Cretaceous (Aptian)-aged geologic formation of the Atlantic coastal plain. It is part of the Potomac Group.

== Description ==
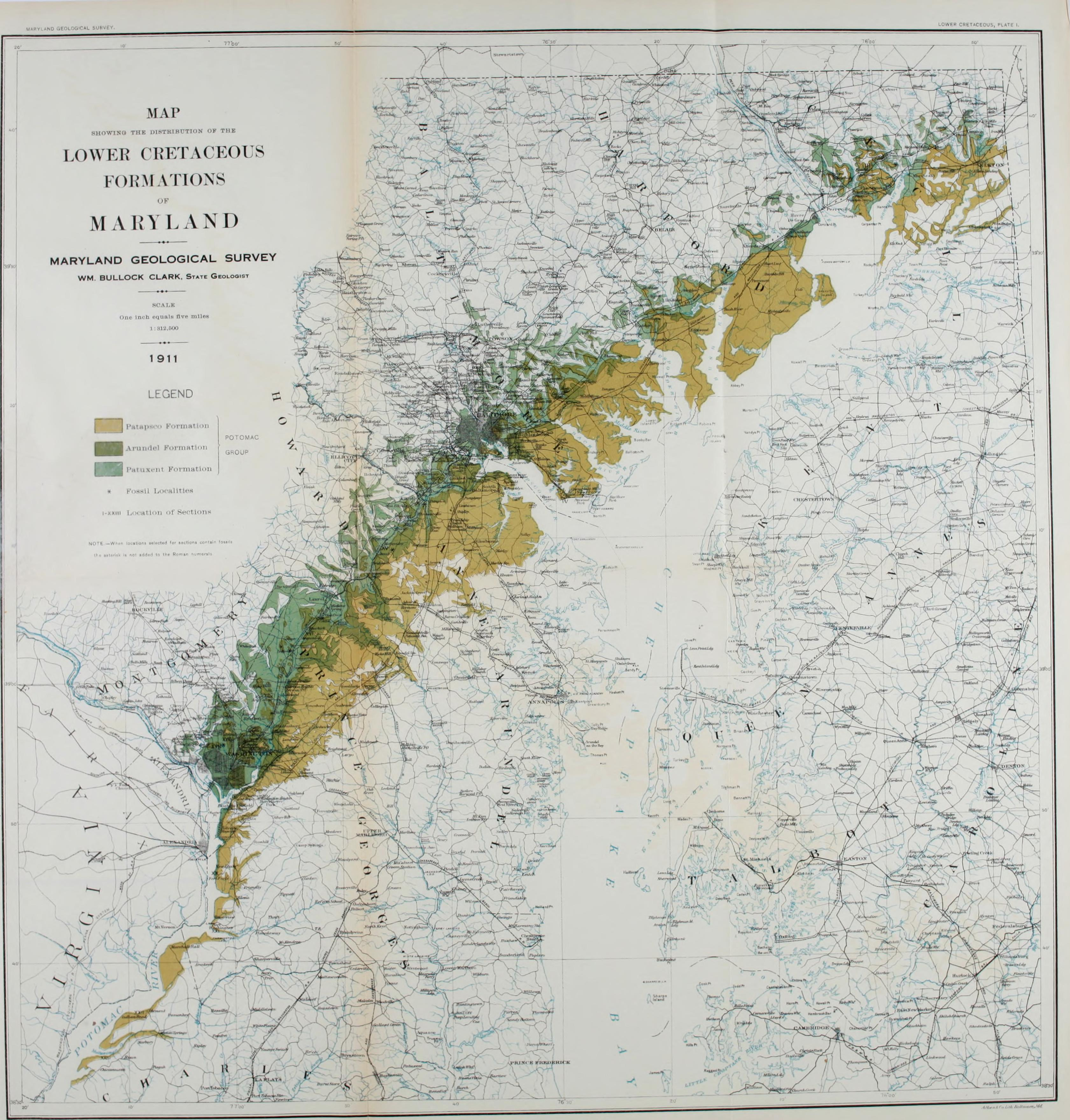
Map of the Patuxent formation exposures in light green.

The Patuxent formation was first described by William Bullock Clark in 1897. The formation is primarily unconsolidated white-grey or orange-brown sand and gravel, with minor clay and silt. The sand often contains kaolinized feldspar, making it an arkose. Clay lumps are common, and sand beds gradually transition to clay. Sandy beds may be crossbedded, which is evidence of shallow water origin.

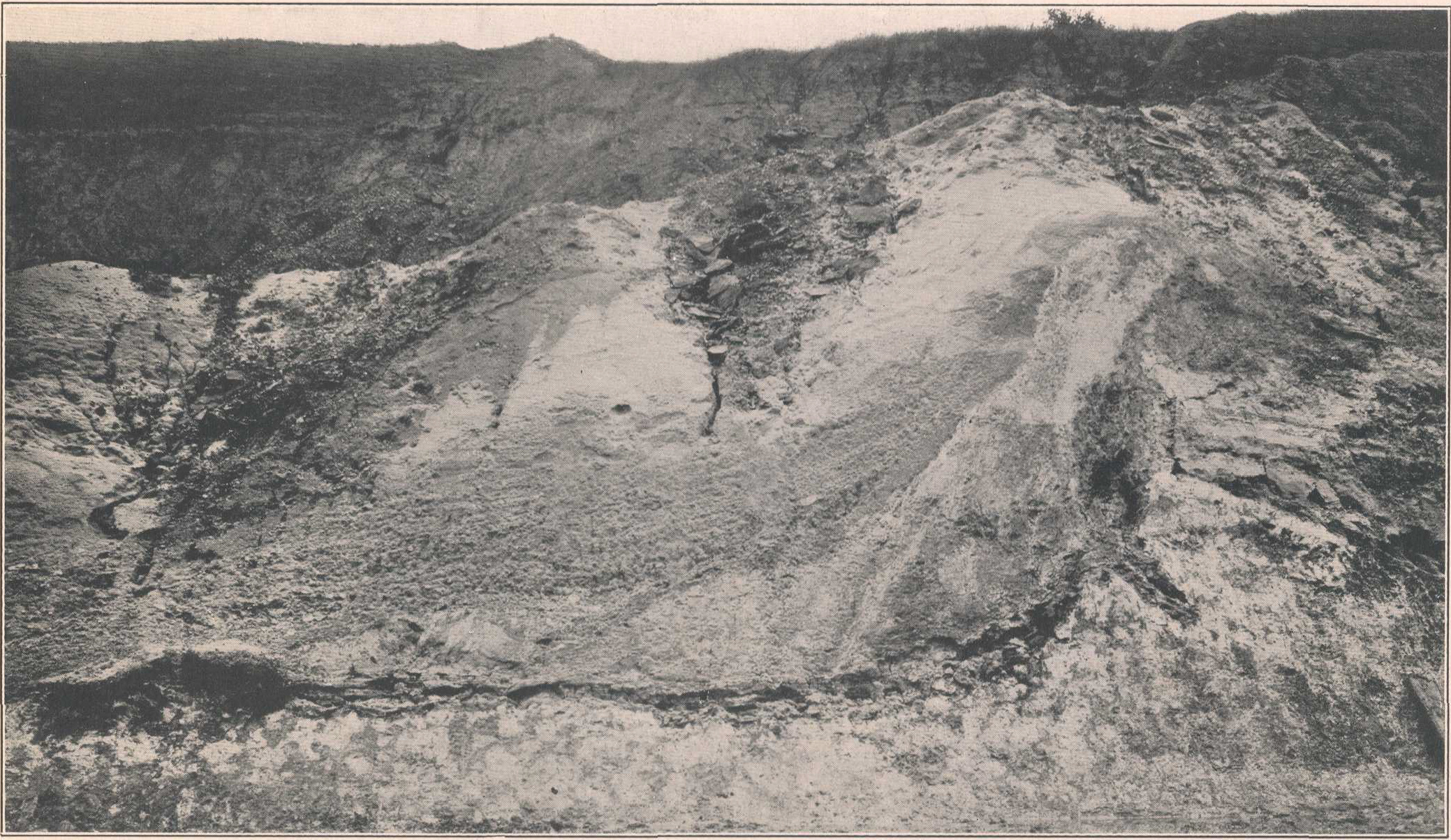
Outcrop along railroad cut in Harford County

The Patuxent is the basal unit of the Coastal Plain sedimentary formations and unconformably overlies the crystalline basement rocks. This underlying unconformity is the subsurface equivalent of the Atlantic Seaboard Fall Line.

=== Notable exposures ===
The type locality is the upper and lower valleys of the Little Patuxent River and Big Patuxent River in Maryland.

== Economic value ==
The Patuxent is a notable aquifer in southern Maryland.

== Age ==
Biostratigraphic dating by Dorf (1952) confirmed Early Cretaceous (Neocomian) age.

== Paleobiota ==
A diverse ichnofauna is known from the formation, comprising the trackways of dinosaurs, pterosaurs, mammals, turtles, and amphibians. Notably, a high proportion of these dinosaur prints appear to be from hatchlings, suggesting nesting sites were located nearby. The preservation of hatchling-sized dinosaur tracks is otherwise very rare in Cretaceous formations. A frog trackway from this formation provides the earliest known evidence of frogs moving by hopping. A particularly diverse trackway series deposited in a former wetland environment is known from the vicinity of Goddard Space Flight Center.

Very few vertebrate body fossils are known from this formation, which is thought to be an artifact of preservation. Propanoplosaurus, a nodosaurid known from a single natural cast and mold of a hatchling, was found recovered from rocks belonging to the Patuxent Formation in Maryland. A single partial impression is known of a bony fish (potential affinities to Paraelops). Isolated nodosaurid scutes are also known.

E. Dorf (1952) compared the flora identified in the Patuxent to that of the Wealden Flora in England studied by Albert Seward. Pollen spores have been identified in the formation by G. J. Brenner (1963).

Color key: Taxon / Reclassified taxon / Taxon falsely reported as present / Dubious taxon or junior synonym / Ichnotaxon / Ootaxon / Morphotaxon	Notes; Uncertain or tentative taxa are in small text; ~~crossed out~~ taxa are discredited.

Based on the Paleobiology Database and Weems (2021):

=== Ray-finned fish ===
Genus	Species	Location	Stratigraphic position	Material	Notes	Images
aff. Paraelops	P. cearensis			Impression of posterior portion (including caudal fin)	A presumed elopomorph fish.	

=== Amphibians ===
Genus	Species	Location	Stratigraphic position	Material	Notes	Images
Anura indet.				Footprints	A frog trackway. The earliest known evidence for hopping locomotion among amphibians.	

=== Reptiles ===
==== Squamates ====
Genus	Species	Location	Stratigraphic position	Material	Notes	Images
?Squamata indet.				Footprint	Tentatively identified as a lizard track	

==== Turtles ====
Genus	Species	Location	Stratigraphic position	Material	Notes	Images
aff. Emydhipus	E. ichsp.			Footprints	A small-sized turtle track.	

==== Crocodylomorphs ====
Genus	Species	Location	Stratigraphic position	Material	Notes	Images
Crocodylomorpha indet.		Goddard Space Flight Center		Footprints	Previously interpreted as pterosaur tracks.	

==== Dinosaurs ====
Based partially on Weems (2021):

Genus	Species	Location	Stratigraphic position	Material	Notes	Images
Brontopodus	B. birdi			Footprints	A sauropod track, potentially made by Astrodon. Very small trackways are known presumably made by juvenile individuals, suggesting that these sauropods nested nearby.	
Caririchnium	C. kortmeyeri (=Amblydactylus gethingi)			Footprints	An ornithopod track, potentially made by iguanodontids.	
Hadrosauropus	H. leonardi			Footprints	An ornithopod track, potentially made by a primitive hadrosaur.	
Hypsiloichnus	H. marylandicus			Footprints	An ornithopod track. Potentially made by hypsilophodontids. Type locality of genus and species.	
Gypsichnites	G. pacensis			Footprints	A medium-sized theropod track. Track maker unknown.	
Irenesauripus	I. glenrosensis			Footprints	A large theropod track, potentially by Acrocanthosaurus.	
Nodosauridae indet.		Goddard Space Flight Center		Osteoderm	A nodosaur scute.	
Ornithomimipus	O. angustus			Footprints	A theropod track, most likely by an ornithomimosaur. At least two different taxa (the smaller O. jaillardi and the larger O. angustus) are represented, of which one appears to have been made by a species identical or related to Arkansaurus.	
Ornithomimipus	O. jaillardi			Footprints	A theropod track, most likely by an ornithomimosaur. At least two different taxa (the smaller O. jaillardi and the larger O. angustus) are represented, of which one appears to have been made by a species identical or related to Arkansaurus.	
Propanoplosaurus	P. marylandicus			A partial body impression of a baby.	A nodosaurid ankylosaur. Type locality of genus and species.	
Tetrapodosaurus	T. borealis			Footprints	An ankylosaur track.	
Tyrannosauripus	T. bachmani (=Megalosauripus sp.)			Footprints	A small theropod track, most likely by a tyrannosauroid. Type locality of species.	

=== Mammals ===
Genus	Species	Location	Stratigraphic position	Material	Notes	Images
Sederipes	S. goddardensis	Goddard Space Flight Center		Footprints	A small mammal track that had a temporary "sitting" posture in-between locomotion, reminiscent of modern small rodents. Only known fossil evidence of this locomotion type. Type locality of genus and species.	

Along with an assemblage from Angola, the Patuxent comprises the world's largest known assemblage of Mesozoic mammal footprints.

== See also ==
- List of dinosaur-bearing rock formations
  - List of stratigraphic units with ornithischian tracks
    - Stegosaur tracks
