= Baños del Flaco Formation =

Geologic formation in Chile

- Stratigraphic range: Tithonian-Berriasian; ~150–141 Ma
- Type: Geological formation
- Unit of: Mendoza Group

Lithology
- Primary: Sandstone
- Other: Limestone

Location
- Coordinates: 34.8°S 70.5°W
- Approximate paleocoordinates: 33.0°S 33.4°W
- Region: O'Higgins Region
- Country: Chile

Type section
- Named for: Baños del Flaco
- Baños del Flaco Formation (Chile)

The Baños del Flaco Formation is a Late Jurassic to Early Cretaceous (Tithonian to Berriasian geologic formation in central Chile. The formation comprises limestones and sandstones deposited in a shallow marine to fluvial environment. Fossil ornithopod tracks have been reported from the formation.

== Fossil content ==
Among others, the following fossils have been found in the formation:

Ichnofossils
- Camptosaurichnus fasolae
- Iguanodonichnus frenkii
- Ornithopoda indet.
- Theropoda indet.

- Ammonites, echinoderms and bivalves

== See also ==
- List of dinosaur-bearing rock formations
  - List of stratigraphic units with ornithischian tracks
    - Ornithopod tracks
- Arcabuco Formation, contemporaneous ichnofossil-bearing formation in Colombia
- Chacarilla Formation, contemporaneous ichnofossil-bearing formation in northern Chile
- Coihaique Group, contemporaneous fossiliferous formation in the Aysén Basin
