= Anatopus =

Trace fossil classification
- Domain: Eukaryota
- Kingdom: Animalia
- Phylum: Chordata
- Clade: Dinosauria
- Clade: Saurischia
- Clade: Theropoda
- Ichnogenus: †Anatopus; Lapparent & Montenat, 1967

Dinosaur footprint

Anatopus is an ichnogenus of dinosaur footprint.

== See also ==
- List of dinosaur ichnogenera
