= Sauroidichnites =

Trace fossil classification
- Ichnoclass: †Ichnolites
- Ichnoorder: †Dipodichnites
- Ichnogenus: †Sauroidichnites; Hitchcock, 1837

Trace fossil

Sauroidichnites is an ichnotaxon of saurian reptiles. The name was originally used by Edward Hitchcock as a higher group name rather than a specific ichnogenus, and thus the name does not have priority over specific ichnogenus names even if they were first identified as Sauroidichnites.

== Paleopathology ==
A Sauroidichnites abnormis trackway preserves tracks made by a theropod with "an abnormally positioned toe". This could be a result of physical injury or behavioral in the way the foot is positioned or lifted from the substrate.

== See also ==
- List of dinosaur ichnogenera
