= Berninasauropus =

Trace fossil classification
- Domain: Eukaryota
- Kingdom: Animalia
- Phylum: Chordata
- Clade: Dinosauria
- Genus: †Berninasauropus

Dinosaur footprint

Berninasauropus is an ichnogenus of dinosaur footprint.

== See also ==
- List of dinosaur ichnogenera
