= Selenichnites =

Selenichnites Temporal range: Cambrian–Jurassic

Trace fossil classification
- Kingdom: Animalia
- Phylum: Arthropoda
- Subphylum: Chelicerata
- Order: Xiphosura
- Ichnogenus: Selenichnites; Romano and Whyte, 1987

Type ichnospecies
- †S. hundalensis Romano and Whyte, 1987

Ichnospecies
- †S. bradfordensis Chisholm, 1985; †S. cordoformis Fischer, 1978; †S. hundalensis Romano and Whyte, 1987; †S. rossendalensis Hardy, 1970; †S. scagliai Poiré and Del Valle, 1996

Synonyms
- Selenichus Romano and Whyte, 1987

Ichnogenus of trace fossil

Selenichnites (‘moon track’) is a Cambrian to Jurassic trace fossil that has been found on every continent. It consists of crescent-shaped impressions interpreted as resting or burrowing traces of extinct members within Xiphosura.

The ichnogenus was originally named Selenichnus in 1987 by M. Romano and M. Whyte, but these investigators renamed it as Selenichnites in 1990 after it was pointed out that the name Selenichnus was already in use for a genus of reptile trace fossils.
