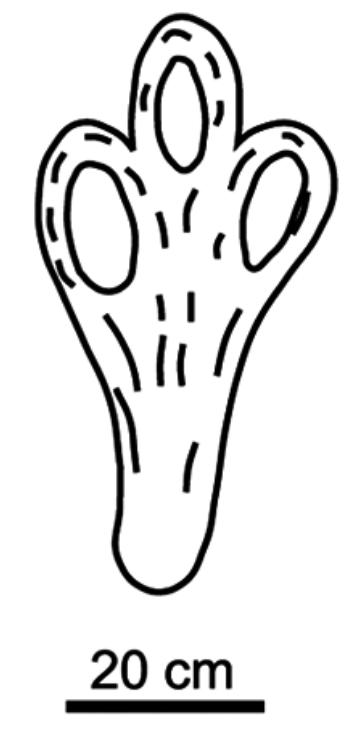
- Footprint of B. tali

Trace fossil classification
- Kingdom: Animalia
- Phylum: Chordata
- Class: Reptilia
- Clade: Dinosauria
- Clade: †Ornithischia
- Clade: †Ornithopoda
- Ichnofamily: †Iguanodontipodidae
- Ichnogenus: †Bonaparteichnium; Calvo, 1991

Type ichnospecies
- †Bonaparteichnium tali Calvo, 1991

= Bonaparteichnium =

Bonaparteichnium Temporal range: Late Cretaceous, ~99–97 Ma

Dinosaur footprint

Bonaparteichnium is a dinosaur ichnogenus known from the Candeleros Formation of Neuquén Province, Argentina. It was named by Jorge O. Calvo in a 1991 paper, alongside the other ornithopod ichnogenera Sousaichnium and Limayichnus. The name of the genus honours Argentinian palaeontology José Bonaparte for his contributions to palaeontology in Argentina. The taxon was named for a 60cm footprint of a bipedal ornithopod; the heel of the track is 28cm long, making it 45% of the track. This length, above that expect for an ornithopod foot, along with the width and robustness of the heel, was the distinguishing trait cited in naming the specimen as a new ichnospecies, and is the basis of the species name tali, referring to word "talon" which means heel. In a 1999 paper Calvo would revise his opinion and consider his three ichnogenera to be synonyms. He noted the extreme similarity of the front half of the foot between Bonaparteichnium and Limayichnus, and that the length and size of a heel in a track is dependent on the method of walking; a bipedal animal walking abnormally low to the ground would produce a track such as that used to name Bonaparteichnium even in lack of a large heel as a genuine anatomical feature. He referred to B. tali as a nomen vanum. In a literature review of hadrosaur ichnotaxa, Ignacio Díaz-Martínez and colleagues considered it a nomen dubium as opposed to referring the specimen to Limayichnus, as they also considered that taxon dubious. They noted that Bonaparteichnium can also be considered a taphotaxon, a term proposed by Spencer G. Lucas to refer to invalid taxa who were thought distinct due to taphonomic distortions.

== See also ==
- List of dinosaur ichnogenera
- Ichnology
