= Paratrisauropus =

Trace fossil classification
- Domain: Eukaryota
- Kingdom: Animalia
- Phylum: Chordata
- Clade: Dinosauriformes
- Genus: †Paratrisauropus; Ellenberger 1970

Ichnospecies
- †Paratrisauropus equester Ellenberger 1970; †Paratrisauropus lifofanensis Ellenberger 1970; †Paratrisauropus mendrezi Ellenberger 1970

Dinosaur footprint

Paratrisauropus is an ichnogenus of dinosaur footprint.

== See also ==
- List of dinosaur ichnogenera
