= Metatetrapous =

Trace fossil classification
- Domain: Eukaryota
- Kingdom: Animalia
- Phylum: Chordata
- Clade: Dinosauria
- Clade: †Ornithischia
- Clade: †Thyreophora
- Clade: †Ankylosauria
- Ichnogenus: †Metatetrapous

Dinosaur footprint

Metatetrapous is an ichnogenus of dinosaur footprint.

== See also ==
- List of dinosaur ichnogenera
