= Lapparentichnus =

Trace fossil classification
- Ichnogenus: †Lapparentichnus; Haubold, 1971

Dinosaur footprint

Lapparentichnus is an ichnogenus of dinosaur footprint, a theropod trackway, made by a member of the Avetheropoda.

== See also ==
- List of dinosaur ichnogenera

== Bibliography ==
- Glut, Donald F. (2003). "Appendix: Dinosaur Tracks and Eggs". Dinosaurs: The Encyclopedia. 3rd Supplement. Jefferson, North Carolina: McFarland & Company, Inc. pp. 613–652. ISBN 0-7864-1166-X.
