= Dakotasaurus =

Trace fossil classification
- Kingdom: Animalia
- Phylum: Chordata
- Class: Reptilia
- Clade: Dinosauria
- Clade: †Ornithischia
- Clade: †Ornithopoda
- Ichnogenus: †Dakotasaurus; Branson & Mehl, 1932

Dinosaur footprint

Dakotasaurus is an ichnogenus of dinosaur footprint.

== See also ==
- List of dinosaur ichnogenera
