= Anatrisauropus =

Anatrisauropus Temporal range: Late Triassic-Early Jurassic, 215–189 Ma

Trace fossil classification
- Domain: Eukaryota
- Kingdom: Animalia
- Phylum: Chordata
- Clade: Dinosauria
- Clade: Saurischia
- Clade: Theropoda
- Ichnogenus: †Anatrisauropus; Ellenberger, 1965

Type ichnospecies
- †Anatrisauropus camisardi Ellenberger, 1965

Other ichnospecies
- †Anatrisauropus ginsburgi Ellenberger, 1970; †Anatrisauropus hereroensis Ellenebrger, 1972

Trace fossil

Anatrisauropus is an ichnogenus of dinosaur footprint, possibly belonging to a saurischian. It has only been discovered in Lesotho (Molteno Formation and Karoo Basin). Three ichnospecies are known: A. camisardi, A. ginsburgi and A. hereroensis; all of which were named by Paul Ellenberger between 1965 and 1972.

== See also ==
- List of dinosaur ichnogenera
