= Parachirotherium =

Trace fossil classification
- Domain: Eukaryota
- Kingdom: Animalia
- Phylum: Chordata
- Ichnofamily: †Parachirotheriidae
- Ichnogenus: †Parachirotherium

Dinosaur footprint

Parachirotherium is an ichnogenus of dinosaur footprint.

== See also ==
- List of dinosaur ichnogenera
