= Elephantopoides =

Trace fossil classification
- Domain: Eukaryota
- Kingdom: Animalia
- Phylum: Chordata
- Clade: Dinosauria
- Clade: Saurischia
- Clade: †Sauropodomorpha
- Clade: †Sauropoda
- Ichnogenus: †Elephantopoides; Kaever & Lapparent, 1974

Trace fossil

Elephantopoides is an ichnogenus of footprint created by sauropods, and known from Jurassic strata.

== See also ==
- List of dinosaur ichnogenera
