= Banisterobates =

Trace fossil classification
- Kingdom: Animalia
- Phylum: Chordata
- Class: Reptilia
- Clade: Dinosauromorpha
- Ichnogenus: †Banisterobates; Fraser & Olsen, 1996

Dinosaur trace fossil

Banisterobates is an ichnogenus of dinosaur footprint. It was found in Virginia and dates from the Triassic period.

== See also ==
- List of dinosaur ichnogenera
