= Hamanosauripus =

Trace fossil classification
- Kingdom: Animalia
- Phylum: Chordata
- Class: Reptilia
- Clade: Dinosauria
- Clade: Saurischia
- Clade: †Sauropodomorpha
- Clade: †Sauropoda
- Ichnogenus: †Hamanosauripus

Dinosaur footprint

Hamanosauripus is an ichnogenus of dinosaur footprint.

== See also ==
- List of dinosaur ichnogenera
