= Eutynichnium =

Trace fossil classification
- Domain: Eukaryota
- Kingdom: Animalia
- Phylum: Chordata
- Clade: Dinosauria
- Clade: Saurischia
- Clade: Theropoda
- Ichnogenus: †Eutynichnium von Nopcsa, 1923 emend. Lockley et al., (2000)

Ichnospecies
- Eutynichnium lusitanicum; Eutynichnium atlasichnus

Dinosaur footprint

Eutynichnium is an ichnogenus of dinosaur footprint.

== See also ==
- List of dinosaur ichnogenera
