= Ligabueichnium =

Trace fossil classification
- Domain: Eukaryota
- Kingdom: Animalia
- Phylum: Chordata
- Clade: Dinosauria
- Clade: †Ornithischia
- Clade: †Thyreophora
- Clade: †Ankylosauria
- Ichnogenus: †Ligabueichnium; Leonardi, 1984

Dinosaur footprint

Ligabueichnium is an ichnogenus of dinosaur footprint, probably made by ankylosaurs.

== See also ==
- List of dinosaur ichnogenera

== Bibliography ==
- Glut, Donald F. (2003). "Appendix: Dinosaur Tracks and Eggs". Dinosaurs: The Encyclopedia. 3rd Supplement. Jefferson, North Carolina: McFarland & Company, Inc. pp. 613–652. ISBN 0-7864-1166-X.
