= Neosauropus =

Trace fossil classification
- Kingdom: Animalia
- Phylum: Chordata
- Class: Reptilia
- Clade: Dinosauria
- Ichnogenus: †Neosauropus; Antunes, 1976

Dinosaur footprint

Neosauropus is an ichnogenus of dinosaur footprint.

== See also ==
- List of dinosaur ichnogenera
