= Wealdenichnites =

Trace fossil classification
- Kingdom: Animalia
- Phylum: Chordata
- Class: Reptilia
- Clade: Dinosauria
- Clade: †Ornithischia
- Clade: †Ornithopoda
- Ichnofamily: †Iguanodontipodidae
- Ichnogenus: †Wealdenichnites; Kuhn, 1958

Dinosaur footprint

Wealdenichnites is an ichnogenus of dinosaur footprint.

== See also ==
- List of dinosaur ichnogenera
