= Koreanosauripus =

Trace fossil classification
- Kingdom: Animalia
- Phylum: Chordata
- Class: Reptilia
- Clade: Dinosauria
- Clade: Saurischia
- Clade: †Sauropodomorpha
- Clade: †Sauropoda
- Ichnogenus: †Koreanosauripus; Kim, 1986

Ichnospecies
- Koreanosauropus cheongi, Kim, 1986 (ichnotype); Koreanosauropus kimi, Kim, 1993

Synonyms
- Goseongosauripus Kim, 1986; Koseongosauripus Kim, 1993

Dinosaur footprint

Koreanosauropus is an ichnogenus of dinosaur footprint.

== See also ==
- List of dinosaur ichnogenera
