= Velociraptorichnus =

Trace fossil classification
- Domain: Eukaryota
- Kingdom: Animalia
- Phylum: Chordata
- Clade: Dinosauria
- Clade: Saurischia
- Clade: Theropoda
- Ichnofamily: †Deinonychosauripodidae
- Ichnosubfamily: †Dromaeopodinae
- Ichnogenus: †Velociraptorichnus; L.I.Zhen, Zhang, Chen & Zhu, 1995

Dinosaur footprint

Velociraptorichnus is an ichnogenus of dinosaur footprint. In 2016 based on the 10 centimetres (0.33 feet) long footprint the animal's size was estimated at 1.2–1.55 meters (3.9–5.1 ft) and 3.9–5.6 kg (8.6–12.3 lb).

== See also ==
- List of dinosaur ichnogenera
