= Bosiutrisauropus =

Trace fossil classification
- Kingdom: Animalia
- Phylum: Chordata
- Class: Reptilia
- Clade: Dinosauria (?)
- Ichnogenus: †Bosiutrisauropus

Trace fossil

Bosiutrisauropus is an ichnogenus of reptile footprint.

== See also ==
- List of dinosaur ichnogenera
