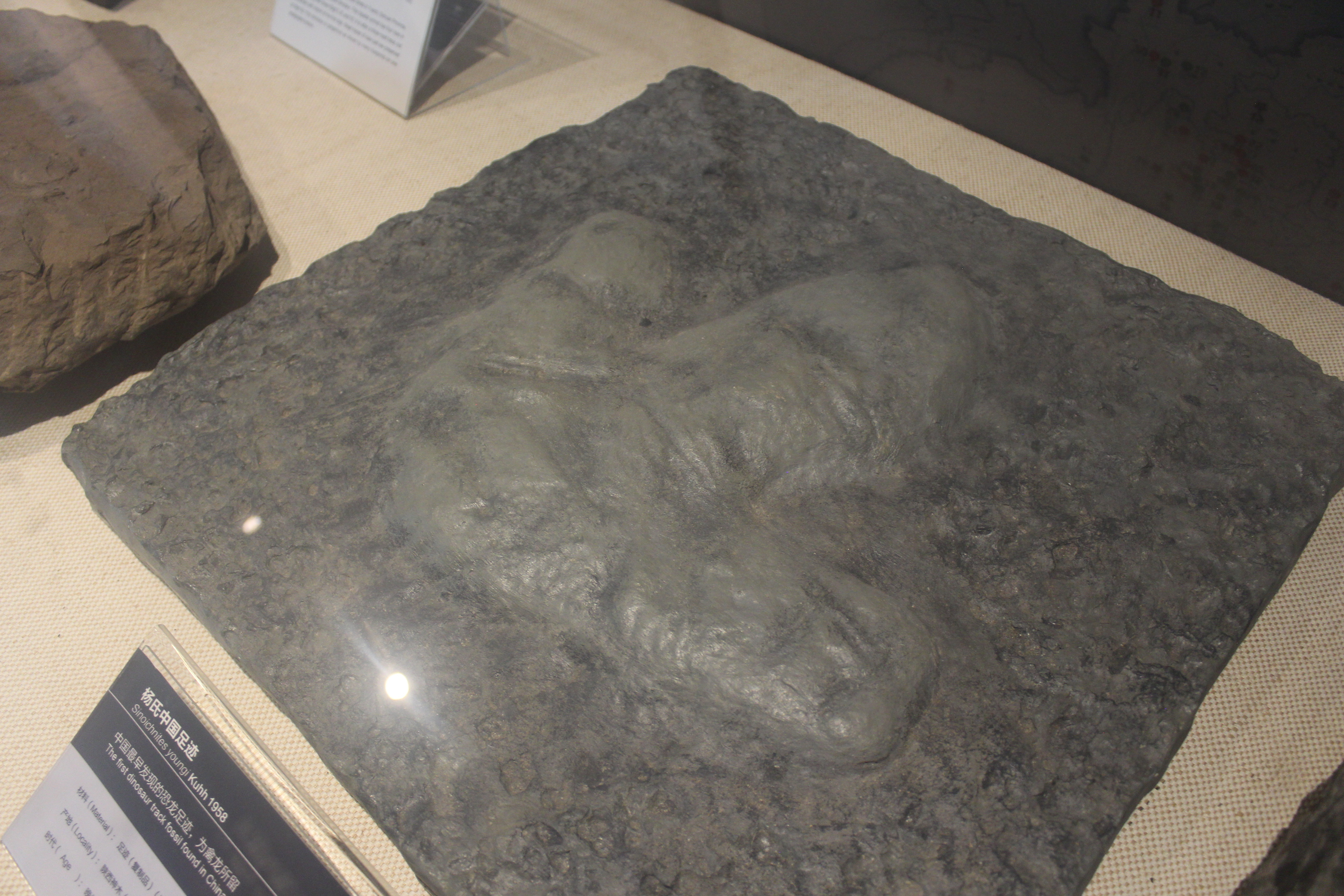
- Cast of S. youngi fossil, Paleozoological Museum of China

Trace fossil classification
- Domain: Eukaryota
- Kingdom: Animalia
- Phylum: Chordata
- Clade: Dinosauria
- Clade: †Ornithischia
- Ichnogenus: †Sinoichnites; Kuhn, 1958

= Sinoichnites =

Dinosaur footprint

Sinoichnites is an ichnogenus of dinosaur footprint.

== See also ==
- List of dinosaur ichnogenera
