= Taupezia =

Trace fossil classification
- Domain: Eukaryota
- Kingdom: Animalia
- Phylum: Chordata
- Clade: Dinosauria
- Clade: Saurischia
- Clade: Theropoda
- Ichnogenus: †Taupezia; Delair, 1963

Dinosaur footprint

Taupezia is an ichnogenus of dinosaur footprint.

== See also ==
- List of dinosaur ichnogenera
