= Neotripodiscus =

Neotripodiscus Temporal range: Early Jurassic, 201.3–174.1 Ma

Trace fossil classification
- Kingdom: Animalia
- Phylum: Chordata
- Class: Reptilia
- Clade: Dinosauria (?)
- Ichnogenus: †Neotripodiscus; Ellenberger, 1970

Trace fossil

Neotripodiscus is an ichnogenus of reptile footprint from Lesotho.

== See also ==
- List of dinosaur ichnogenera
