= Orcauichnites =

Trace fossil classification
- Domain: Eukaryota
- Kingdom: Animalia
- Phylum: Chordata
- Clade: Dinosauria
- Clade: †Ornithischia
- Clade: †Ornithopoda
- Family: †Iguanodontidae
- Ichnogenus: †Orcauichnites; Llompart, Casanovas & Santafe, 1984

Dinosaur footprint

Orcauichnites is an ichnogenus of dinosaur footprint.

== See also ==
- List of dinosaur ichnogenera
