= Gyrotrisauropus =

Trace fossil classification
- Kingdom: Animalia
- Phylum: Chordata
- Class: Reptilia
- Clade: Dinosauria
- Clade: †Ornithischia
- Ichnogenus: †Gyrotrisauropus; Ellenberger, 1970

Trace fossil

Gyrotrisauropus is an ichnogenus of reptile footprint.

== See also ==
- List of dinosaur ichnogenera
