= Rotundichnus =

Trace fossil classification
- Domain: Eukaryota
- Kingdom: Animalia
- Phylum: Chordata
- Clade: Dinosauria
- Clade: Saurischia
- Clade: †Sauropodomorpha
- Clade: †Sauropoda
- Ichnogenus: †Rotundichnus

Dinosaur footprint

Rotundichnus is an ichnogenus of dinosaur footprint. The ichnospecies Rotundichnus muchehagensis dates to the early lower Cretaceous in central Laurasia (present-day Germany) and the largest footprint, that was 87 cm (2.85 ft) long, belongs to an individual that measured 21.5 meters (70.5 ft) and weighed 36.5 tonnes (40.2 short tons).

== See also ==
- List of dinosaur ichnogenera
