= Ornithopodichnites =

Trace fossil classification
- Domain: Eukaryota
- Kingdom: Animalia
- Phylum: Chordata
- Clade: Dinosauria
- Ichnogenus: †Ornithopodichnites; Llompart, Casanovas & Santafe, 1984

Dinosaur footprint

Ornithopodichnites is an ichnogenus of dinosaur footprint.

== See also ==
- List of dinosaur ichnogenera
