= Trihamus =

Trace fossil classification
- Domain: Eukaryota
- Kingdom: Animalia
- Phylum: Chordata
- Clade: Dinosauria
- Ichnogenus: †Trihamus; Hitchcock, 1862

Dinosaur footprint

Trihamus is an ichnogenus of (probably bipedal) dinosaur footprint.

== See also ==
- List of dinosaur ichnogenera
