= Gigantosauropus =

Trace fossil classification
- Domain: Eukaryota
- Kingdom: Animalia
- Phylum: Chordata
- Clade: Dinosauria
- Clade: Saurischia
- Clade: †Sauropodomorpha
- Clade: †Sauropoda
- Ichnogenus: †Gigantosauropus; Mensink & Mertmann, 1984

Ichnospecies
- †Gigantosauropus asturiensis Mensink & Mertmann, 1984

Ichnogenus of dinosaur footprint

Gigantosauropus is an ichnogenus of dinosaur footprint.

== See also ==
- List of dinosaur ichnogenera
