= Anticheiropus =

Anticheiropus Temporal range: Early Jurassic, 199–195 Ma

Trace fossil classification
- Domain: Eukaryota
- Kingdom: Animalia
- Phylum: Chordata
- Clade: Dinosauria
- Ichnogenus: †Anticheiropus; Hitchcock, 1865

Type ichnospecies
- †Anticheiropus hamatus Hitchcock, 1865

Other ichnospecies
- †Anticheiropus pilulatus Hitchcock, 1865

Dinosaur footprint

Anticheiropus is an ichnogenus of dinosaur footprint belonging to a saurischian. It has only been discovered in Massachusetts (Portland Formation, Newark Supergroup). Two ichnospecies are known (both are known from a single footprint): A. hamatus and A. pilulatus, both discovered around 1863 and named by Edward Hitchcock in 1865.

It had large digits and its tracks were about 20 centimeters long, with no pads from the feet shown on the fossil itself, though the middle digit is the longest on its foot. One of the toes is offset from the rest of the foot, which is where the etymology of Anticheiropus stems from.

== See also ==
- List of dinosaur ichnogenera
