= Gregaripus =

Trace fossil classification
- Domain: Eukaryota
- Kingdom: Animalia
- Phylum: Chordata
- Clade: Dinosauria
- Clade: †Ornithischia
- Ichnofamily: †Anomoepodidae
- Ichnogenus: †Gregaripus; Weems, 1987

Type ichnospecies
- †Gregaripus bairdi Weems, 1987

Dinosaur footprint

Gregaripus is an ichnogenus of dinosaur footprint. It is possibly synonymous with Anomoepus, and may represent underprints that are instead referable to this ichnogenus.

== See also ==
- List of dinosaur ichnogenera
