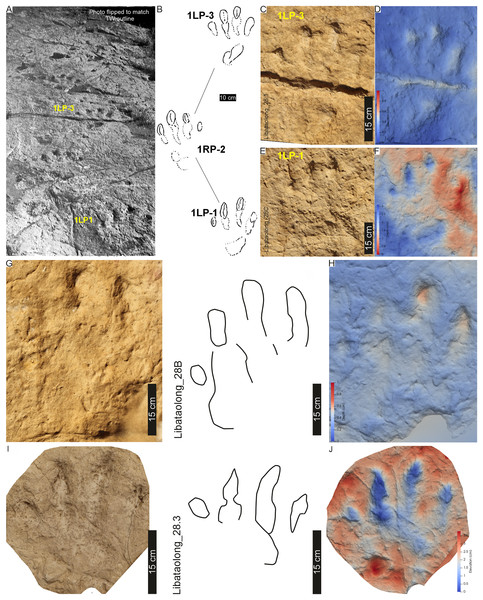
- Footprints of Pseudotetrasauropus bipedoida from the Libataolong track site of Lesotho

Trace fossil classification
- Domain: Eukaryota
- Kingdom: Animalia
- Phylum: Chordata
- Clade: Dinosauria
- Clade: Saurischia
- Clade: †Sauropodomorpha
- Ichnofamily: †Otozoidae
- Ichnogenus: †Pseudotetrasauropus

= Pseudotetrasauropus =

Pseudotetrasauropus Temporal range: Late Triassic, ~209.6–208.5 Ma

Dinosaur footprint

Pseudotetrasauropus is an ichnogenus of sauropod dinosaur footprint from the Elliot Formation of Lesotho and South Africa. In 2020 based on the 60 cm (2 ft) long footprint Molina-Pérez and Larramendi estimated the size of the animal at 9.1 meters (30 ft) and 2 tonnes (2.2 short tons).

== See also ==
- List of dinosaur ichnogenera
