= Plesiothornipos =

Trace fossil classification
- Domain: Eukaryota
- Kingdom: Animalia
- Phylum: Chordata
- Clade: Dinosauria (?)
- Ichnogenus: †Plesiothornipos

Trace fossil

Plesiothornipos is an ichnogenus of mammal footprint.

== See also ==
- List of dinosaur ichnogenera
