= Cosmorhaphe =

Trace fossil classification
- Ichnogenus: †Cosmorhaphe; Fuchs, 1895

Trace fossil

Cosmorhaphe is an ichnogenus representing grazing feeding behavior (pascichnia).

The Renaissance naturalist Ulisse Aldrovandi discussed and described a specimen of Cosmorhaphe, which is therefore among the first fossils to be illustrated
