= Ultrasauripus =

Trace fossil classification
- Kingdom: Animalia
- Phylum: Chordata
- Class: Reptilia
- Clade: Dinosauria
- Clade: Saurischia
- Clade: †Sauropodomorpha
- Clade: †Sauropoda
- Ichnogenus: †Ultrasauripus

Dinosaur footprint

Ultrasauripus is an ichnogenus of dinosaur footprint, found in Gyeongsang Province, South Korea. Ιn 2020 Molina-Pérez and Larramendi, based on the 1.24 meters (4.1 feet) long footprint, estimated the size of the animal at 27–34.5 meters (89–113 ft) and 55 tonnes (60 short tons). It was a member of the Euhelopodidea family.

== See also ==
- List of dinosaur ichnogenera
