= Mafatrisauropus =

Trace fossil classification
- Domain: Eukaryota
- Kingdom: Animalia
- Phylum: Chordata
- Clade: Dinosauria
- Clade: Saurischia
- Ichnogenus: †Mafatrisauropus

Trace fossil

Mafatrisauropus is an ichnogenus of reptile footprint.

== See also ==
- List of dinosaur ichnogenera
