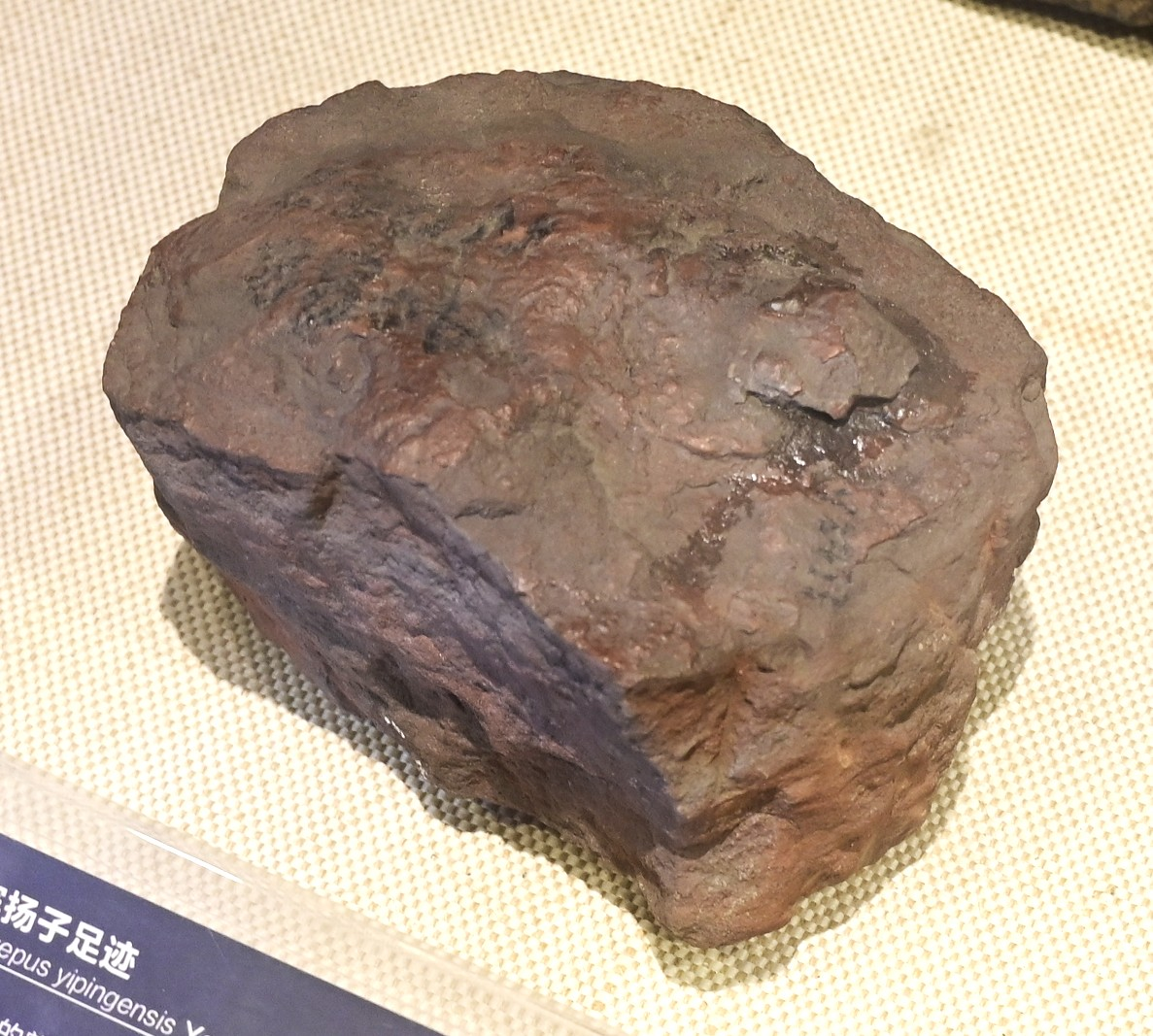
- Holotype of Y. yipingensis (IVPP V2473), Paleozoological Museum of China

Trace fossil classification
- Kingdom: Animalia
- Phylum: Chordata
- Clade: Dinosauria
- Clade: Saurischia
- Clade: Theropoda
- Ichnogenus: †Yangtzepus; Young, 1960

= Yangtzepus =

Dinosaur footprint

Yangtzepus is an ichnogenus of dinosaur footprint.

== See also ==
- List of dinosaur ichnogenera
