= Qomoqomosauropus =

Qomoqomosauropus Temporal range: Early Jurassic, Hettangian–Pliensbachian

Trace fossil classification
- Kingdom: Animalia
- Phylum: Chordata
- Class: Reptilia
- Clade: Dinosauria (?)
- Ichnogenus: †Qomoqomosauropus; Ellenberger, 1970

Trace fossil

Qomoqomosauropus is an ichnogenus of an unknown reptile footprint that lived from the Hettangian to Pliensbachian periods of the Early Jurassic. The footprint was impressed by a sauropod or large theropod in the modern day Kingdom of Lesotho, South Africa. This imprint was discovered by archeologist P. Ellenberger in 1970, and was named by him after the locale. Point of discovery: Lesotho (30.4° S, 27.7° E: paleocoordinates 44.0° S, 1.8° W).

== See also ==
- List of dinosaur ichnogenera
