= Iranosauripus =

Iranosauripus Temporal range: Late Triassic – Early Jurassic, 201.6–182.7 Ma

Trace fossil classification
- Ichnogenus: Iranosauripus; Lapparent & Nowgol Sadat, 1975

Type ichnospecies
- †Iranosauripus zerabensis Lapparent & Nogwol Sadat, 1975

Synonyms
- Iranosaurus Lapparent & Nogwol Sadat, 1975

Dinosaur footprint

Iranosauripus is an ichnogenus of dinosaur footprint found in the Shemshak Group of Iran that supposedly belonged to a theropod. Iranosauripus supposedly existed during Middle Triassic to Early Jurassic, although the first true dinosaurs, such as Eoraptor, did not exist until the Late Triassic; the age of the specimens has since been refined to 201.6 to 183.0 Ma and further to 182.7 Ma.

== Discovery and naming ==
The first known footprints were discovered in 1975 in the Shemshak Group in the Alborz Mountains of Iran by Albert-Félix de Lapparent and M. A. Nowgol Sadat, and the type ichnospecies, I. zerabensis was also named in 1975. Abbassi (2014) described more specimens.

== See also ==
- List of dinosaur ichnogenera
