= Paragrallator =

Trace fossil classification
- Domain: Eukaryota
- Kingdom: Animalia
- Phylum: Chordata
- Clade: Dinosauria
- Clade: Saurischia
- Clade: Theropoda
- Ichnofamily: †Grallatoridae
- Ichnogenus: †Paragrallator; Li & Zhang, 2000

Ichnospecies
- †Paragrallator matsiengensis (Ellenberger, 1970); †Paragrallator yangi Li & Zhang, 2000

Dinosaur footprint

Paragrallator is an ichnogenus of dinosaur footprint. Its ichnospecies have been found in China and Lesotho.

== See also ==
- List of dinosaur ichnogenera
