= Delatorrichnus =

Trace fossil classification
- Domain: Eukaryota
- Kingdom: Animalia
- Phylum: Chordata
- Clade: Dinosauria
- Clade: †Ornithischia
- Ichnofamily: †Delatorrichnopodidae
- Ichnogenus: †Delatorrichnus; Casamiquela, 1964

Dinosaur footprint

Delatorrichnus is an ichnogenus of dinosaur footprint.

== See also ==
- List of dinosaur ichnogenera
