= Sillimanius =

Trace fossil classification
- Domain: Eukaryota
- Kingdom: Animalia
- Phylum: Chordata
- Clade: Dinosauria
- Clade: Saurischia
- Clade: Theropoda
- Ichnogenus: †Sillimanius; Hitchcock, 1845

Dinosaur footprint

Sillimanius is an ichnogenus of dinosaur footprint.

== See also ==
- List of dinosaur ichnogenera
