= Gypsichnites =

Gypsichnites Temporal range: Early Cretaceous

Trace fossil classification
- Kingdom: Animalia
- Phylum: Chordata
- Class: Reptilia
- Clade: Dinosauria
- Clade: †Ornithischia
- Clade: †Ornithopoda
- Family: †Iguanodontidae
- Ichnogenus: †Gypsichnites; Sternberg, 1932

Dinosaur footprint

Gypsichnites is an ichnogenus of dinosaur footprint.

== See also ==
- List of dinosaur ichnogenera
