= Chacarilla Formation =

Geologic formation in Chile

- Stratigraphic range: Oxfordian-Aptian; ~160–120 Ma
- Type: Geological formation
- Underlies: Cerro Empexa Formation
- Overlies: not exposed
- Thickness: min. 1,100 m (3,600 ft)

Lithology
- Primary: Sandstone, shale

Location
- Coordinates: 20.6°S 69.1°W
- Approximate paleocoordinates: 21.5°S 36.1°W
- Region: Tarapacá Region
- Country: Chile
- Extent: Tarapacá Basin

Type section
- Named for: Quebrada de Chacarilla
- Chacarilla Formation (Chile)

The Chacarilla Formation (Spanish: Formación Chacarilla) is an Oxfordian to Early Cretaceous geologic formation of the Tarapacá Basin in northern Chile, close to the border with Bolivia. The marine and fluvial formation preserves several dinosaur trackways and has been declared a Natural Sanctuary (Spanish: Santuario de la Naturaleza) in 2004.

== Description ==
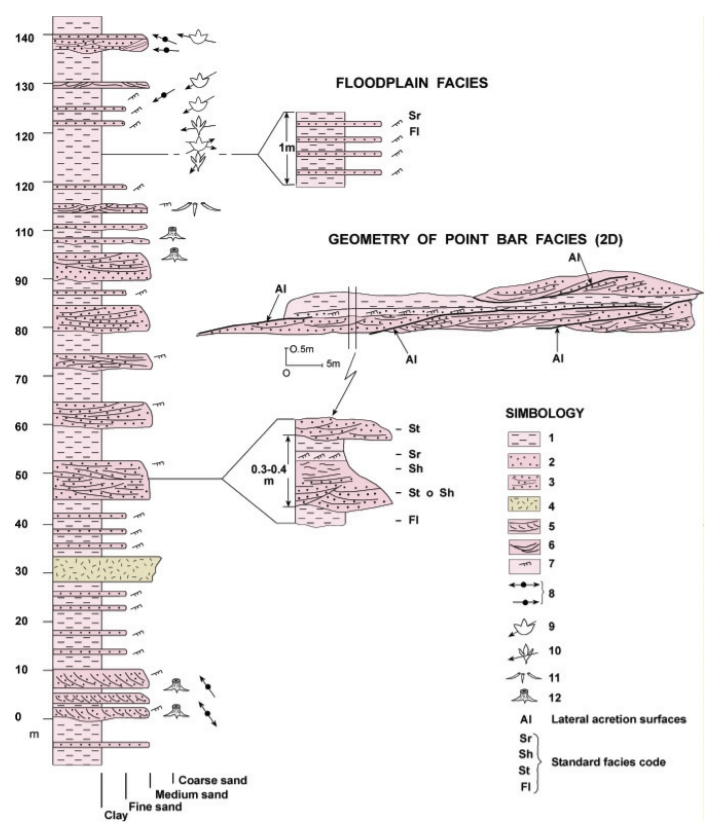
Stratigraphic column of the formation

The formation comprises a sequence of rhythmically alternating shales and red sandstones with a minimum thickness of 1,100 metres (3,600 ft). The lower part of the formation was deposited under marine conditions and the upper part in a meandering river floodplain and point bar environment. Paleocurrent analysis demonstrated a flow direction towards the west, northwest and west-northwest.

The formation contains ichnofossils of theropods and ornithopods, occurring in the Early Cretaceous upper part of the formation, which is marked by an angular unconformity, overlain by volcanic and clastic rocks of the Late Cretaceous to Early Paleocene Cerro Empexa Formation. The top of the formation is not younger than Aptian.

== Fossil content ==
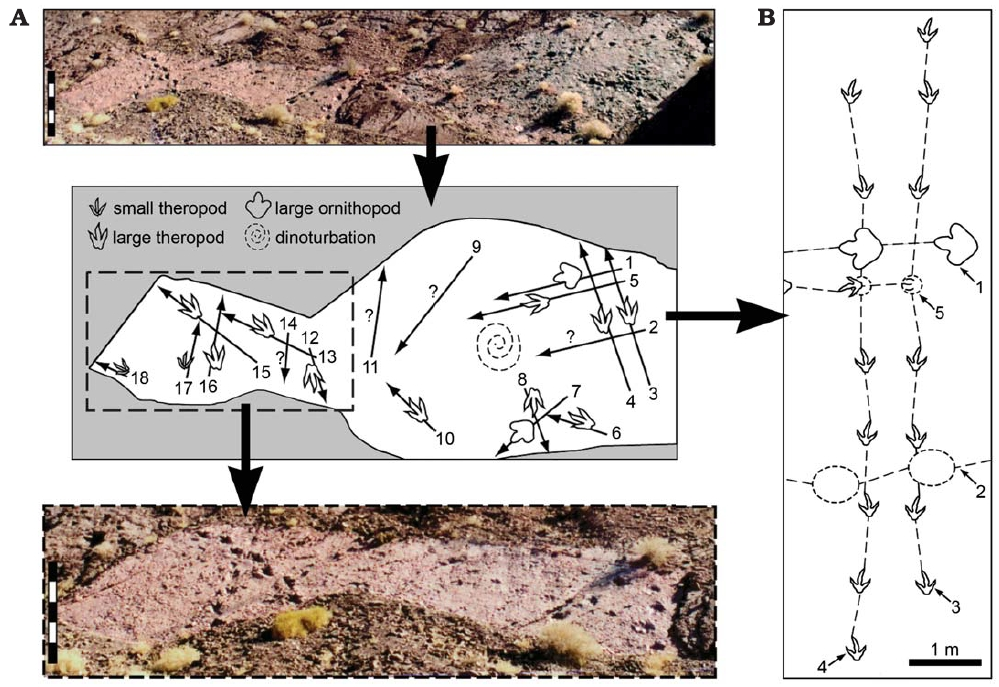
Dinosaur tracksite of the Chacarilla Formation

Fossil stegosaur, sauropod and theropod tracks and fossil flora have been reported from the formation.

The fourteen trackways of the Chacarilla III tracksite consist of 76 individual footprints. Two of the trackways consist of large ornithopod footprints (average footprint length 39 centimetres (15 in) and average width 32 centimetres (13 in)). Two other trackways consist of small theropod footprints (less than 25 centimetres (9.8 in) long). The other ten trackways were made by large theropods (footprint length more than 30 centimetres (12 in)). The large theropod tracks are tri− and tetradactyl, mesaxonic, and have lengths and widths between 31 to 65 centimetres (12 to 26 in) and 21 to 46 centimetres (8.3 to 18.1 in), respectively. Nearly all digit impressions possess claw marks, but they lack clear impressions of digital pads. The stride length varies between 230 and 307 centimetres (7.55 and 10.07 ft). The speed of the dinosaurs leaving the tracks is estimated at 4 to 7 kilometres per hour (2.5 to 4.3 mph).

Additionally, in the Jurassic part of the formation, fossil flora was reported, containing fossils of Posidonomya, Perisphinctes, Baiera sp., Brachyphyllum sp., Cladophlebis sp., Dictyophyllum sp., Equisetites sp., Nilsonia sp., Pterophyllum sp., Ptilophyllum sp., Taeniopteris sp., and Filicales.

== See also ==
- List of dinosaur-bearing rock formations
  - List of stratigraphic units with ornithischian tracks
    - Stegosaur tracks
- Arcabuco Formation, contemporaneous ichnofossil-bearing formation in Colombia
- La Puerta Formation, contemporaneous ichnofossil-bearing formation in Bolivia
- Baños del Flaco Formation, contemporaneous ichnofossil-bearing formation in central Chile
