= Plesiornis =

Trace fossil classification
- Ichnogenus: †Plesiornis; Hitchcock, 1858

Ichnospecies
- Plesiornis pilulatus Hitchcock, 1858

Dinosaur footprint

Plesiornis, whose name means "nearly bird", is an ichnogenus of theropod dinosaur footprint. Tracks attributed to this ichnogenus are found in the Late Triassic-Early Jurassic of North America and Poland. The definitive trackmaker of this ichnotaxon is currently uncertain.

== See also ==
- List of dinosaur ichnogenera
