= Satapliasaurus =

Satapliasaurus Temporal range: Middle Jurassic-Early Cretaceous 175–130 Ma

Trace fossil classification
- Kingdom: Animalia
- Phylum: Chordata
- Class: Reptilia
- Clade: Dinosauria
- Clade: Saurischia
- Clade: Theropoda
- Family: incertae sedis
- Ichnogenus: †Satapliasaurus; Gabuniya, 1951

Type ichnospecies
- †Satapliasaurus dsocenidzei Gabuniya, 1951

Other ichnospecies
- †Satapliasaurus tschabukanii Gabuniya, 1951; †Satapliasaurus kandelakii Gabuniya, 1951

Extinct genus of dinosaurs

Satapliasaurus is an extinct genus of theropod dinosaur known from multiple well-preserved trackways. Satapliasarus is known from three ichnospecies: S. dsocenidzei, Satapliasaurus kandelakii (ichnospecies) and Satapliasaurus tschabukianii. The fossils and trackways have been found in Cretaceous sediments of Georgia and the Middle Jurassic of England. The genus is named after the Sataplia Managed Reserve in Georgia.

Satapliasaurus dsocenidzei, the type species, was described based on an isolated, 25 centimeter long footprint preserving a hallux mark that was collected from the Cleveland Basin, the basin dating to the Middle Jurassic.
