= Moraesichnium =

Trace fossil classification
- Domain: Eukaryota
- Kingdom: Animalia
- Phylum: Chordata
- Clade: Dinosauria
- Clade: †Ornithischia
- Clade: †Ornithopoda
- Ichnogenus: †Moraesichnium; Leonardi, 1979

Dinosaur footprint

Moraesichnium is an ichnogenus of dinosaur footprint.

== See also ==
- List of dinosaur ichnogenera
