= Selenichnus =

Trace fossil classification
- Domain: Eukaryota
- Kingdom: Animalia
- Phylum: Chordata
- Class: Reptilia
- Clade: Archosauria
- Clade: Pseudosuchia
- Clade: Crocodylomorpha
- Ichnofamily: †Batrachopodidae
- Ichnogenus: †Selenichnus; Hitchcock, 1858

Dinosaur footprint

Selenichnus is an ichnogenus of dinosaur and or pseudosuchian footprint.

== See also ==
- List of dinosaur ichnogenera
