= Xiuningpus =

Xiuningpus Temporal range: 99.7–66.043 Ma

Trace fossil classification
- Kingdom: Animalia
- Phylum: Chordata
- Class: Reptilia
- Clade: Dinosauria (?)
- Ichnogenus: †Xiuningpus; Yu, 1988

Type ichnospecies
- †Xiuningpus xintanensis Yu, 1988

Other ichnospecies
- †Xiuningpus qukouensis Yu, 1988

Dinosaur footprint

Xiuninggpus is an extinct ichnogenus of dinosaur footprint. There are two known ichnospecies, X. xintanensis and X. qukouensis.
