= Platypterna =

Trace fossil classification
- Domain: Eukaryota
- Kingdom: Animalia
- Phylum: Chordata
- Clade: Dinosauria
- Ichnogenus: †Platypterna

Dinosaur footprint

Platypterna is an ichnogenus of dinosaur footprint.

== See also ==
- List of dinosaur ichnogenera
