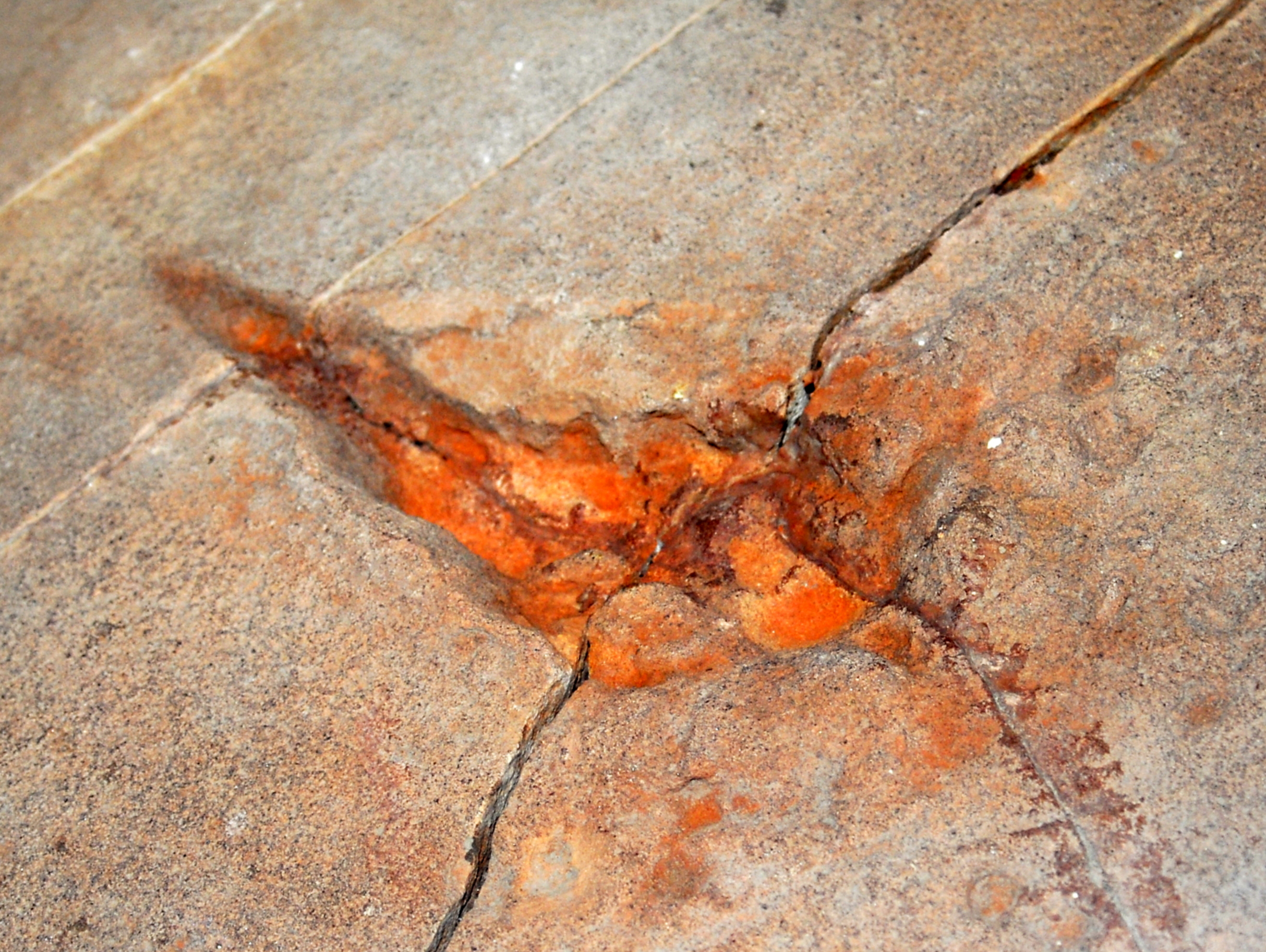
- Sarmientichnus footprints from Argentina

Trace fossil classification
- Domain: Eukaryota
- Kingdom: Animalia
- Phylum: Chordata
- Clade: Dinosauria
- Clade: Saurischia
- Clade: Theropoda
- Ichnogenus: †Sarmientichnus; Casamiquela, 1964

= Sarmientichnus =

Sarmientichnus Temporal range: See text

Dinosaur footprint

Sarmientichnus is an ichnogenus of dinosaur footprint.

== Fossil record ==
These footprints have been found in Callovian/Oxfordian eolian sandstones of Argentina (age range: from 164.7 to 155.7 million years ago). They have been identified as belonging to small ground dwelling carnivore dinosaurs, probably Coelurosaurs. The size of the largest footprint was 4.4 cm (0.14 ft) and was made by an individual that was 65 cm (2.1 ft) in length and 495 grams (1.1 lbs) in weight.

== See also ==
- List of dinosaur ichnogenera
