= Dinehichnus =

Trace fossil classification
- Domain: Eukaryota
- Kingdom: Animalia
- Phylum: Chordata
- Clade: Dinosauria
- Clade: †Ornithischia
- Clade: †Ornithopoda
- Family: †Dryosauridae
- Ichnogenus: †Dinehichnus; Lockley, Santos, Meyer & Hunt, 1998

Extinct genus of dinosaurs

Dinehichnus is an ichnogenus found in the Morrison Formation that is attributed to dryosaurid dinosaurs. The trackways are present in Saltwash Member outcrops at Boundary Butte in southernmost Utah. Dinehichnus trackways are frequently found in groups, traveling parallel to one another. From this it can be inferred that the Dinehichnus trackmaker was a social animal. Dinehichnus tracks preserve impressions of three widely splayed toes on feet that point inwardly, as well as heel marks.

== See also ==
- Paleobiota of the Morrison Formation
