= Hermatomycesporites =

Hermatomycesporites Temporal range: Bathonian-Kimmeridgian ~167–151 Ma

Scientific classification
- Kingdom: Fungi
- Division: Ascomycota
- Class: incertae sedis
- Genus: †Hermatomycesporites; Garcia Massini et al., 2026
- Species: †H. patagonicus

Binomial name
- †Hermatomycesporites patagonicus Garcia Massini et al., 2026

Extinct genus of hyphomycete fungus

Hermatomycesporites is an enigmatic extinct genus of fungi belonging to the division Ascomycota, from the Late Jurassic of Argentina. It is a monotypic genus, containing only Hermatomycesporites patagonicus.

== Discovery and naming ==
The holotype material for Hermatomycesporites was found within San Agustin geothermal locality from the La Matilde Formation, Santa Cruz Province, Argentina. It was formally described and named in 2026.

The generic name Hermatomycesporites derives from the genus name of the extant Hermatomyces, due to the notable similarities of the conidia between the two. The specific name patagonicus derives from the place Patagonia, the region in which the fossils were found.

== Description ==
Hermatomycesporites patagonicus is a fungal colony, which is densely composed of arranged hyaline to hyphae up to 4.5 μm (0.00018 in) in diameter, which is partitioned by melanized septa, all of which forms a sporodochial mass over the remains of plants. Fossils also bear conidia, which is dictyosporous in nature, being composed of multiple septa forming a brick-like appearance of the cellular structure. The conidia can range from cylindrical forms with few cells, to lenticular, discoid and broadly fan-shaped conidia which are multicellular in morphology and range from 4–7.1 μm (0.00016–0.00028 in) in width, all of which are notably dorsiventrally flattened in nature, and bear a ring of lighter peripheral cells.

Chlamydospores are also present in fossil material, with a range of melanized and hyaline sclerotia, as well as a range of morphologies from discoid up to 22.5–30 μm (0.00089–0.00118 in) in width, pyriform ranging between 20–75 μm (0.00079–0.00295 in) in width, heart-shaped ranging between 20–62.5 μm (0.00079–0.00246 in) in width, reniform ranging between 24–72.5 μm (0.00094–0.00285 in) in width, and cerebriform ranging between 27.5–53.75 μm (0.001083–0.002116 in) in width, including a myriad of irregular forms, all of which arise from single to multiple hyphae, and sometimes bear thin, distally tapering penetration-like hyphae, which gets up to 1 μm (3.9×10^{−5} in) in width.

== Affinities ==
Hermatomycesporites is noted to share multiple features seen across many extant mitosporic fungi, and the range of morphological characteristics is similar to what is seen in hyphomycetous fungi.

The researchers describing Hermatomycesporites compared it to multiple extant hyphomycetous fungi, such as Epicoccum, due to the similarities in the production of multicellular conidia and chlamydospore-like structures, although it is noted that their conidia and chlamydospores differ from each other in their overall morphology. Hermatomycesporites was also compared to Hermatomyces, due to the similarities in their dorsiventrally flattened conidia, the peripheral lighter rings, and the thick-walled propagules.
