= Camptosaurichnus =

Trace fossil classification
- Kingdom: Animalia
- Phylum: Chordata
- Class: Reptilia
- Clade: Dinosauria
- Clade: †Ornithischia
- Clade: †Ornithopoda
- Ichnogenus: †Camptosaurichnus; Casamiquela & Fasola, 1968

Dinosaur footprint

Camptosaurichnus is an ichnogenus of footprint found in Colchagua (Chile), belonging to an Ornithopod dinosaur. It was from the Tithonian age of the Jurassic.

== See also ==
- List of dinosaur ichnogenera
