= Middle Triassic =

Second epoch of the Triassic period

- 246.7 – ~237 Ma
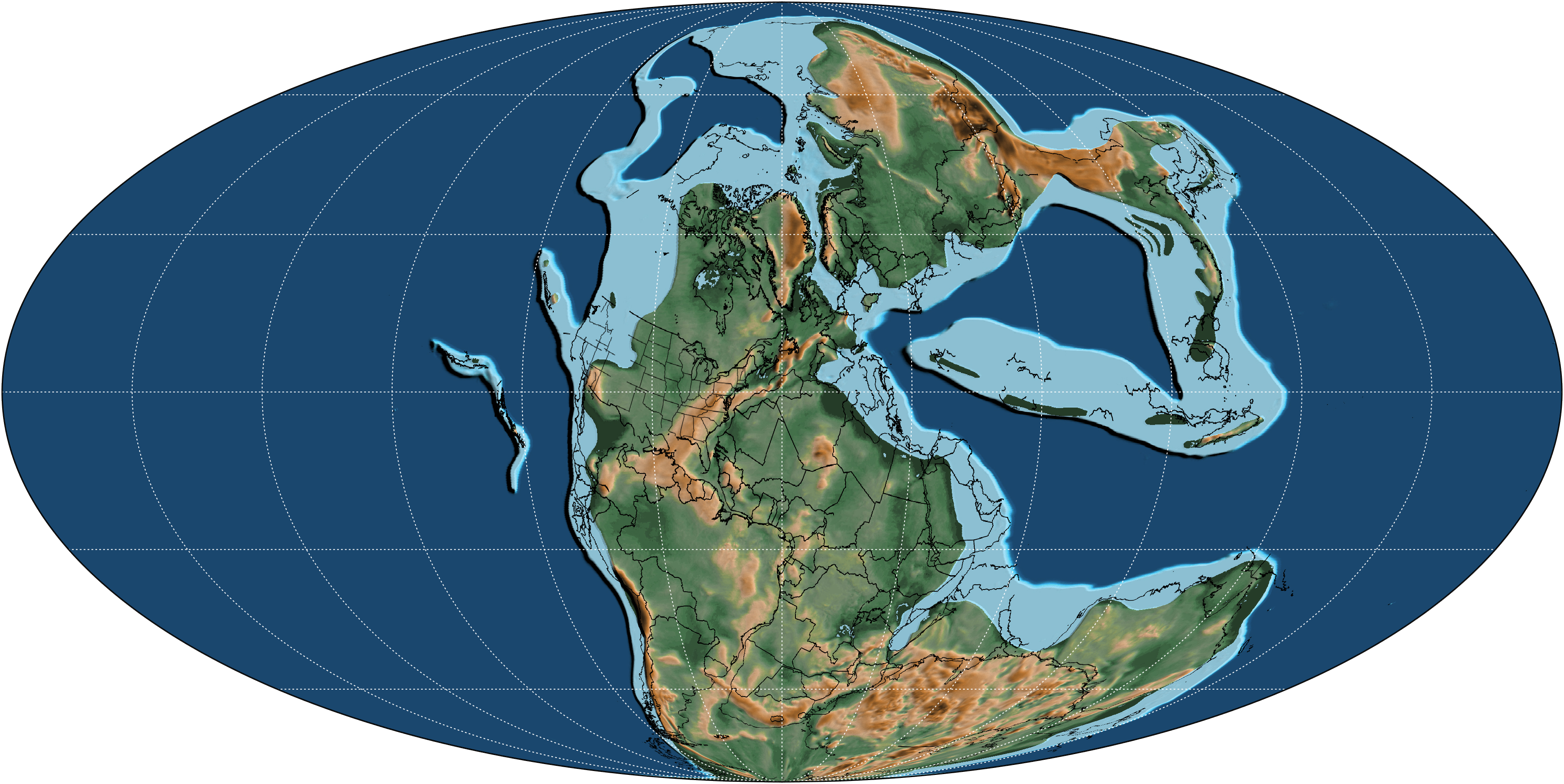
- A map of Earth as it appeared 240 million years ago during the Middle Triassic Epoch, Ladinian Age

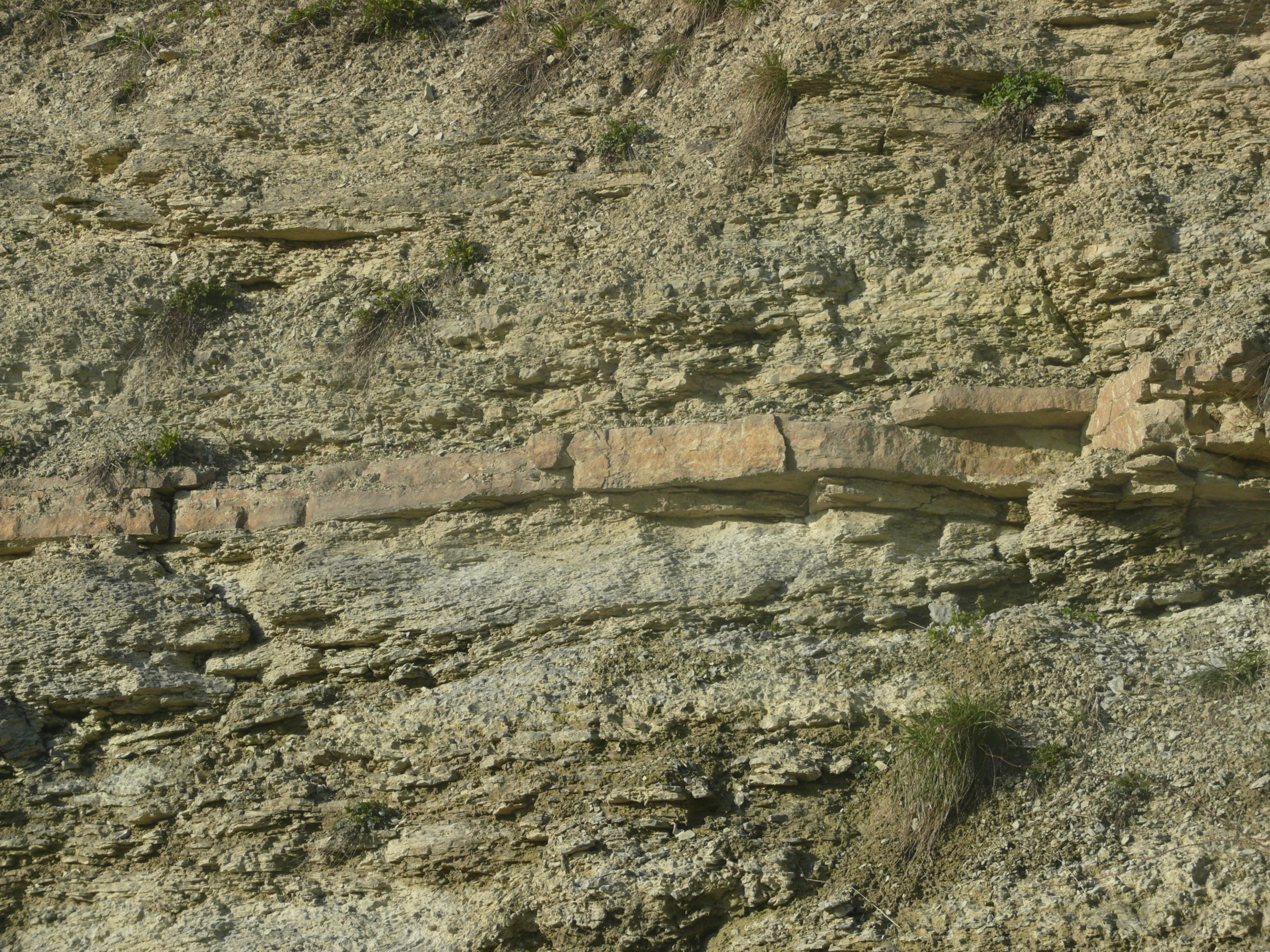
- Middle Triassic aged Muschelkalk (Schaumkalk) in Baden-Württemberg, Germany

Chronology
← / Triassic–Jurassic extinction event; ← / Scleractinian corals & calcified sponges; ← / Carnian pluvial episode; ← / Manicouagan impact; ← / Coals return; ← / Full recovery of woody trees; ← / Smithian–Spathian boundary event; ← / Permian-Triassic extinction event
Subdivision of the Triassic according to the ICS, as of 2024. Vertical axis scale: Millions of years ago

Etymology
- Name formality: Formal

Usage information
- Celestial body: Earth
- Regional usage: Global (ICS)
- Time scale(s) used: ICS Time Scale

Definition
- Chronological unit: Epoch
- Stratigraphic unit: Series
- Time span formality: Formal
- Lower boundary definition: Not formally defined
- Lower boundary definition candidates: FAD of the Conodont Chiosella timorensis; Base of magnetic zone MT1n
- Lower boundary GSSP candidate section(s): Desli Caira, Northern Dobruja, Romania; Guandao, Guizhou, China
- Upper boundary definition: FAD of the Ammonite Daxatina canadensis
- Upper boundary GSSP: Prati di Stuores, Dolomites, Italy; 46.5269°N 11.9303°E
- Upper GSSP ratified: 2008

In the geologic timescale, the Middle Triassic is the second of three epochs of the Triassic period or the middle of three series in which the Triassic system is divided in chronostratigraphy. The Middle Triassic spans the time between 247 Ma and 237 Ma (million years ago). It is preceded by the Early Triassic Epoch and followed by the Late Triassic Epoch. The Middle Triassic is divided into the Anisian and Ladinian ages or stages.

Formerly the middle series in the Triassic was also known as Muschelkalk. This name is now only used for a specific unit of rock strata with approximately Middle Triassic age, found in western Europe. The Ashfield Shale and Bringelly Shale of western Sydney date to this epoch, with the former featuring fluvial fossils from that era.

== Middle Triassic life ==
Following the Permian–Triassic extinction event, the most devastating of all mass-extinctions, life recovered slowly. In the Middle Triassic, many groups of organisms reached higher diversity again, such as the marine reptiles (e.g. ichthyosaurs, sauropterygians, thallatosaurs), ray-finned fish and many invertebrate groups like molluscs (ammonoids, bivalves, gastropods).

During the Middle Triassic, there were not yet any flowering plants, but instead there were seed ferns and gymnosperms. Small dinosauriforms began to appear, like Nyasasaurus and the ichnogenus Iranosauripus.

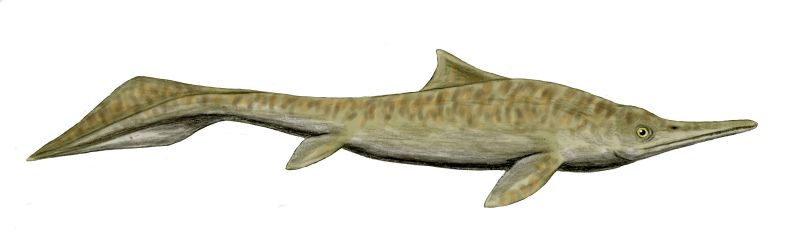
Mixosaurus cornalianus restoration, a Middle Triassic ichthyosaur
