= Xiangxipus =

Trace fossil classification
- Kingdom: Animalia
- Phylum: Chordata
- Class: Reptilia
- Clade: Dinosauria
- Clade: Saurischia
- Clade: Theropoda
- Clade: Maniraptoriformes
- Ichnogenus: †Xiangxipus; Zeng, 1982

Dinosaur trace fossil

Xiangxipus is an ichnogenus of dinosaur from ichnofamily Eubrontidae. Footprints of this dinosaur are found only in Cretaceous deposits of China in Xiangxi, Jiuquwan mine tracksite (HV). These deposits were dated at 99.7 to 66.043 Ma.

Xiangxipus was a ground dwelling carnivore.

== Discovery and naming ==
Ichnogenus Xiangxipus and all ichnospecies of this ichnogenus were described by Zeng in 1982 by footprints from Xiangxi. The genus name refers to the fact that footprints were found in Xiangxi.

== Systematic ==
Xiangxipus includes two ichnospecies:

- Xiangxipus chenxiensis
- Xiangxipus youngi

== See also ==
- List of dinosaur ichnogenera
