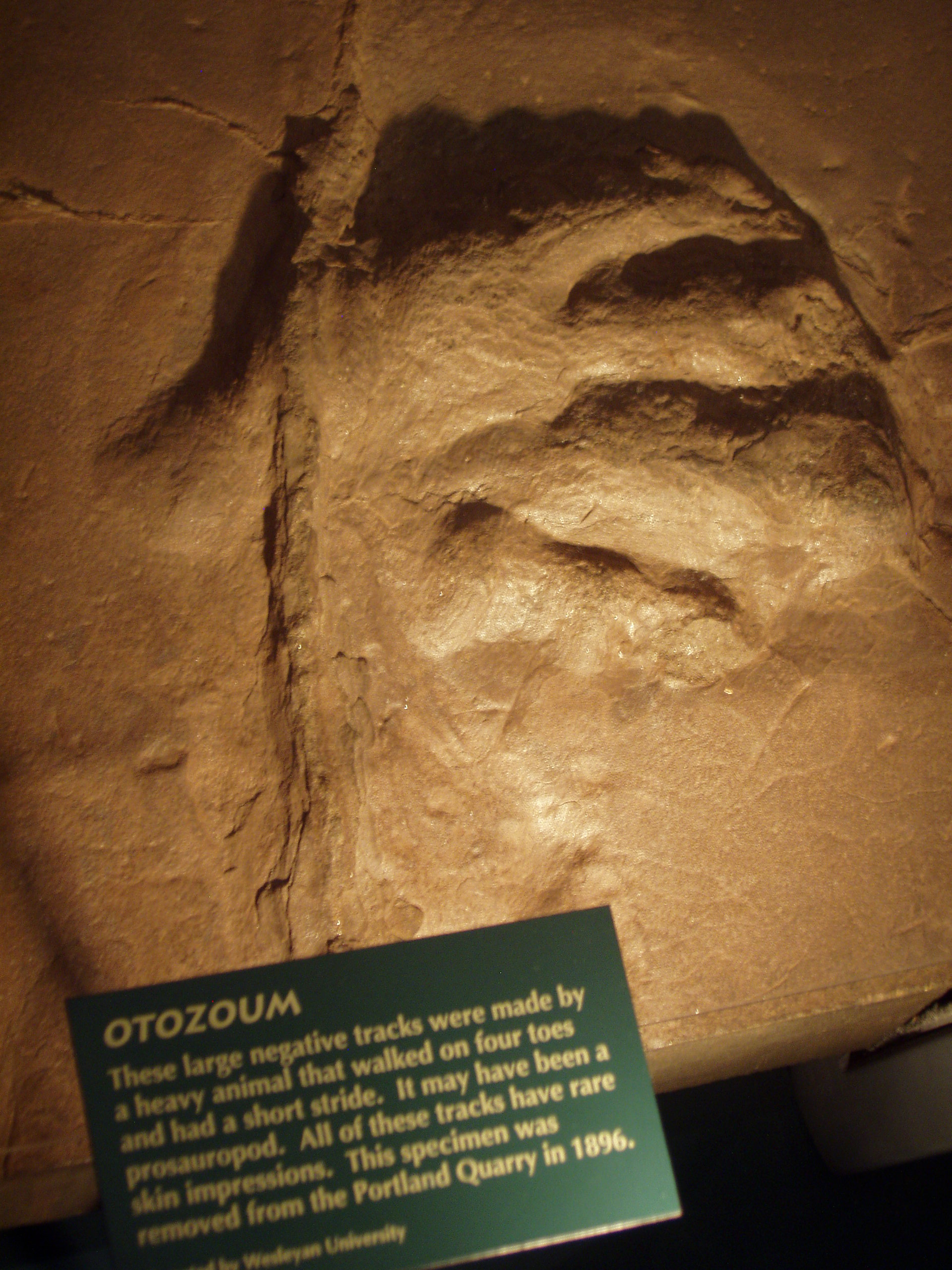
- Otozoum moodii footprint

Trace fossil classification
- Kingdom: Animalia
- Phylum: Chordata
- Class: Reptilia
- Clade: Dinosauria
- Clade: Saurischia
- Clade: †Sauropodomorpha
- Ichnofamily: †Otozoidae
- Ichnogenus: †Otozoum; Hitchcock, 1847

Ichnospecies
- †Otozoum caudatum Hitchcock, 1871; †Otozoum grandcombensis Gand et al. 2000; †Otozoum minus Lull, 1915; †Otozoum moodii Hitchcock, 1847 (type ichnospecies)

= Otozoum =

Otozoum Temporal range: Late Triassic - Middle Jurassic, 221–175 Ma

Dinosaur footprint

Otozoum ("giant animal") is an extinct ichnogenus (fossilized footprints and other markings) of sauropodomorph dinosaur from the Late Triassic-Middle Jurassic sandstones. Footprints were made by heavy, bipedal or, sometimes, quadrupedal animals with a short stride that walked on four toes directed forward. These footprints are relatively large, over 20 cm in pes length. Otozoum differs from Plateosaurus by having a notable homopody.

== Discovery and naming ==
Otozoum tracks were discovered by American paleontologist Edward Hitchcock, who described Otozoum as the "most extraordinary track yet brought to light in this valley [the Connecticut River] representing a bipedal animal... distinguished from all others... in the sandstone of New England". The ichnogenus was named by him in 1847, after the giant Otus.

Hitchcock noted the excellent preservation of some tracks, preserving details of the skin, pads, and even impressions of Jurassic raindrops. Excellent Otozoum specimens from the Portland Quarry may be seen in the Dinosaur State Park and Arboretum in Rocky Hill, Connecticut.

== Taxonomy ==
In 1953, Yale University paleontologist Richard Swann Lull revised Hitchcock's work, suggesting that the track maker might have been a prosauropod. Other sources have been proposed, including a crocodile-like animal (e.g. the phytosaur Rutiodon), or an ornithopod dinosaur, although later osteological comparisons support Lull's hypothesis that the track maker was indeed a prosauropod.

== Paleoenvironment ==
Otozoum grandcombensis from the Late Triassic ‘Grès supérieurs et Argilites bariolées’ Formation lived in a wide flood plain which also served as a habitat for theropod Grallator andeolensis.

== See also ==
- List of dinosaur ichnogenera
