= Hadrosaurichnoides =

Trace fossil classification
- Domain: Eukaryota
- Kingdom: Animalia
- Phylum: Chordata
- Clade: Dinosauria
- Ichnogenus: †Hadrosaurichnoides; Casanovas Cladellas et al., 1994

Dinosaur footprint

Hadrosaurichnoides is an Early Cretaceous ichnogenus of dinosaur footprint erected by María Lourdes Casanovas Cladellas. The original description attributed the ichnogenus to an ornithopod trackmaker, but in 2001 Lockley and Wright argued that they were actually left by theropods because the prints were longer and narrower than would be expected for ornithopod tracks.
