= Sauropus (ichnogenus) =

Sauropus Temporal range: Hettangian

Trace fossil classification
- Domain: Eukaryota
- Kingdom: Animalia
- Phylum: Chordata
- Clade: Dinosauria
- Clade: Saurischia
- Clade: Theropoda
- Ichnogenus: †Sauropus; Hitchcock, 1845

Dinosaur trace fossil

Sauropus is a dinosaur imprint. One imprint given this name may be from a sitting dinosaur, perhaps made by a dinosaur similar to Psittacosaurus. The authors of The Beginning of the Age of Dinosaurs: Faunal Change across the Triassic-Jurassic Boundary argue that the name should be abandoned, because the original type specimen (from a slab found in Middleton, Connecticut) is "so worn as to be indeterminate", a second specimen "shows no indication whatsoever of manus impressions" and is judged to be a mix of impressions from different animals, a third specimen is "a poor but typical Anomoepus sitting trackway", and "all other specimens cited as examples of Sauropus (E. Hitchcock, 1858) prove to be either very sloppy and indeterminate tracks ... or good specimens of Anomoepus".

== See also ==
- List of dinosaur ichnogenera
