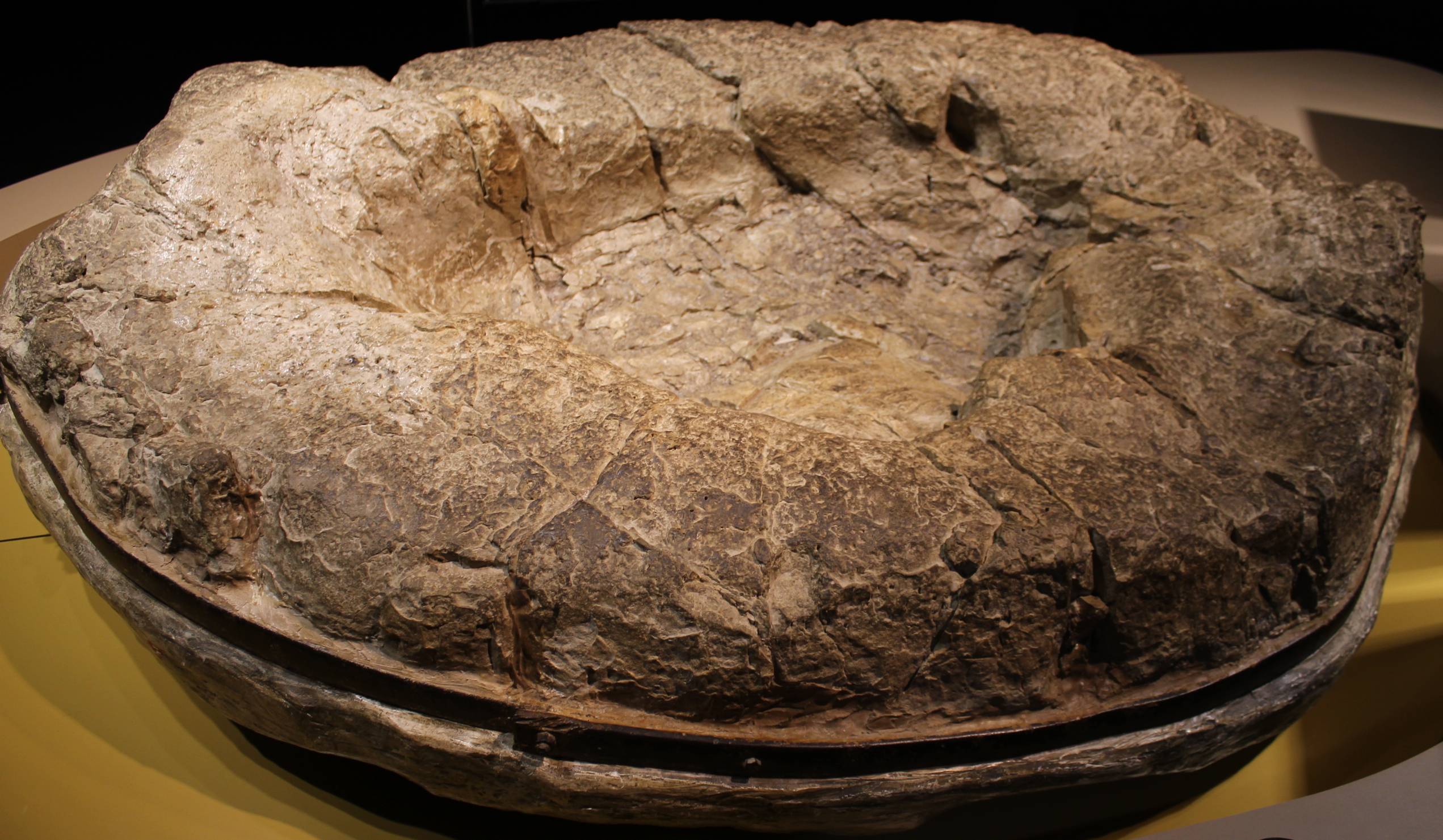
- Brontopodus birdi

Trace fossil classification
- Kingdom: Animalia
- Phylum: Chordata
- Class: Reptilia
- Clade: Dinosauria
- Clade: Saurischia
- Clade: †Sauropodomorpha
- Clade: †Sauropoda
- Ichnogenus: †Brontopodus; Farlow, Pillman & Hawthorne, 1989

Synonyms
- Chuxiongpus Chen & Huang, 1993

= Brontopodus =

Dinosaur footprint

Brontopodus is an ichnogenus of dinosaur footprint by sauropod trackmaker. This ichnogenus is mainly characterized by a wide-gauge trackway, which is distinguishable from narrow-gauge sauropod tracks like Breviparopus or Parabrontopodus. Sauropods with broad bodies, such as titanosaurs, are thought to be their trackmakers.

== See also ==
- List of dinosaur ichnogenera
