= Ornithomimipus =

Trace fossil classification
- Kingdom: Animalia
- Phylum: Chordata
- Class: Reptilia
- Clade: Dinosauria
- Clade: Saurischia
- Clade: Theropoda
- Clade: †Ornithomimosauria
- Ichnofamily: †Ornithomimipodidae
- Ichnogenus: †Ornithomimipus; Sternberg, 1926

Synonyms
- Irenichnites Sternberg, 1932

Dinosaur footprint

Ornithomimipus is an ichnogenus of dinosaur footprint.

== See also ==
- List of dinosaur ichnogenera
