= List of dinosaur ichnogenera =

This list of dinosaur ichnogenera is a comprehensive listing of all ichnogenera that have been attributed to dinosaurs, excluding class Aves (birds, both living and those known only from fossils) and purely vernacular terms. The list includes all commonly accepted ichnogenera, but also genera that are now considered invalid, doubtful (nomen dubium), or were not formally published (nomen nudum), as well as junior synonyms of more established names, and ichnogenera that are no longer attributed to dinosaurs.

== Scope and terminology ==
There is no official, canonical list of dinosaur ichnogenera. An extensive list can be found in an appendix to Donald F. Glut's third supplement to his series of dinosaur encyclopedias (2003). The vast majority of citations are based on Glut's list; exceptions, such as more recent ichnotaxa, are noted. Synonymies are also after Glut.

== A ==
Contents:	A B C D E F G H I J K L M N O P Q R S T U V W X Y Z – See also

Ichnogenus	Classification	Age Range	Location
Abelichnus	Carnosaur	99.6 - 93.5 Ma	Argentina
Amblydactylus	Iguanodontid	112.6 to 94.3 Ma	Australia Canada USA
Anatrisauropus	Saurischian?	201.6 to 189.6 Ma	Lesotho
Anomoepus	Ornithopod	221.5 to 94.3 Ma	Australia Canada China Italy Lesotho Poland USA
Anticheiropus	Saurischian	201.6 to 196.5 Ma	USA
Apatichnus	Ornithopod	201.6 to 196.5 Ma	USA
Argoides	Saurischian	221.5 to 196.5 Ma	USA

== B ==
Contents:	A B C D E F G H I J K L M N O P Q R S T U V W X Y Z – See also

Ichnogenus	Classification	Age Range	Location
Banisterobates	Dinosauria	237.0 to 227.3 Ma	United States
Bonaparteichnium	Iguanodont	99.7 to 94.3 Ma	Argentina
Bosiutrisauropus	Theropoda	227.3 to 205.7 Ma	Lesotho
Boutakioutichnium	Theropod	161.5 to 149.2 Ma	Morocco
Bressanichnus	Non-avian coelurosaur	99.7 to 94.3 Ma	Argentina
Breviparopus	Sauropod	167.7 to 150.8 Ma	Morocco Switzerland
Brontopodus	Sauropod	201.6 to 85.8 Ma	Australia Chile China Morocco Poland Portugal South Korea Spain Switzerland USA
Byakudansauripus	Theropod	140.2 to 125.45 Ma	Japan

== C ==
Contents:	A B C D E F G H I J K L M N O P Q R S T U V W X Y Z – See also

Ichnogenus	Classification	Age Range	Location
Camptosaurichnus	Ornithopod	150.8 to 145.5 Ma	Chile
Caririchnium	Ornithopod	125.45 to 70.6 Ma	Brazil China Japan South Korea Thailand USA
Carmelopodus	Theropod	167.7 to 164.7 Ma	England Morocco USA
Ceratopsipes	Ceratopsian	71 Ma	USA
Changpeipus	Carnosaur	175.6 to 112.6 Ma	Australia China
Characichnos	Theropod	205.6 to 99.7 Ma	China USA
Chuxiongpus	Sauropod (Junior synonym of Brontopodus)	94 to 90 Ma	China
Coelurosaurichnus	Theropod	235.0 to 145.5 Ma	France Germany Italy Slovakia Tajikistan USA
Columbosauripus	Non-avian coelurosaur	99.7 to 94.3 Ma	Canada
Corvipes	Ornithopod	201.6 to 196.5 Ma	USA

== D ==
Contents:	A B C D E F G H I J K L M N O P Q R S T U V W X Y Z – See also

Ichnogenus	Classification	Age Range	Location
Dakotasaurus	Ornithopod	112.6 to 94.3 Ma	USA
Defarrariischnium	Non-avian coelurosaur	99.7 to 94.3 Ma	Argentina
Delatorrichnus	Ornithischian	164.7 to 155.7 Ma	Argentina Poland
Deltapodus	Ornithischian	175.6 to 66 Ma	China England India Morocco Portugal Spain
Dilophosauripus	Theropod	196.5 to 183.0 Ma	France USA
Dinehichnus	Ornithopod	155.7 to 150.8 Ma	Poland Portugal USA
Dromaeopodus	Dromaeosaurid	130.0 to 70.6 Ma	Bolivia China
Dromaeosauriformipes	Dromaeosaurid	112.4 to 106.5 Ma	South Korea
Dromaeosauripus	Dromaeosaurid	130.0 to 106.5 Ma	China South Korea United States

== E ==
Contents:	A B C D E F G H I J K L M N O P Q R S T U V W X Y Z – See also

Ichnogenus	Classification	Age Range	Location
Elephantopoides	Sauropod?	155.7 to 150.8 Ma	Germany
Eubrontes	Theropod	Late Triassic to Early Jurassic	Australia China Czech Republic France India Italy Morocco Poland Slovakia Spain Sweden USA
Eutynichnium	Tetanuran	164.7 to 155.7 Ma	Morocco Portugal

== F ==
Contents:	A B C D E F G H I J K L M N O P Q R S T U V W X Y Z – See also

Ichnogenus	Classification	Age Range	Location
Farlowichnus	Theropod	Early Cretaceous (Berriasian–Hauterivian)	Brazil

== G ==
Contents:	A B C D E F G H I J K L M N O P Q R S T U V W X Y Z – See also

Ichnogenus	Classification	Age Range	Location
Garbina	Stegosaur	175.6 to 125.45 Ma	Australia
Gigantosauropus	Sauropod?	155.7 to 150.8 Ma	Spain
Grallator	Theropod	221.5 to 99.7 Ma	Algeria Australia Brazil Canada China England France Hungary India Iran Italy Lesotho Morocco Niger Poland Scotland Slovakia Sweden Tajikistan USA Zimbabwe
Gregaripus	Ornithischian	221.5 to 205.6 Ma	USA
Gypsichnites	Iguanodontid	112.6 to 99.7 Ma	Canada USA
Gyrotrisauropus	Ornithischian	~237–182 Ma Lesotho	

== H ==
Contents:	A B C D E F G H I J K L M N O P Q R S T U V W X Y Z – See also

Ichnogenus	Classification	Age Range	Location
Hadrosaurichnus	Hadrosaur	70.6 to 66.043 Ma	Argentina Peru Romania
Hadrosaurichnoides	Nomen dubium		Spain
Hamanosauripus	Sauropod	105.4 to 95.7 Ma	South Korea
Hispanosauropus	Theropod	155.7 to 150.8 Ma	Spain USA
Hopiichnus	Ornithomimid	196.5 to 183.0 Ma	USA
Huanglongpus	Ornithopod?	163.5 to 145 Ma	China
Hunanpus	Carnosaur	99.7 to 66.043 Ma	China
Hypsiloichnus	Ornithopod	125.45 to 112.6 Ma	USA

== I ==
Contents:	A B C D E F G H I J K L M N O P Q R S T U V W X Y Z – See also

Ichnogenus	Classification	Age Range	Location
Iberosauripus	Theropod	152 to 145 Ma	Spain
Iguanodonichnus	Sauropod	150.8 to 66.043 Ma	Chile Romania
Iguanodonopus	Theropod	125.45 to 89.3 Ma	China
Iguanodontipus	Ornithopod	155.7 to 125.45 Ma	Germany Spain
Iranosauripus	Theropod	201.6 to 183.0 Ma	Iran
Irenesauripus	Tetanuran	150.8 to 70.6 Ma	Canada Poland USA
Irenichnites	Non-avian coelurosaur	109.0 to 105.3 Ma	Canada USA

== J ==
Contents:	A B C D E F G H I J K L M N O P Q R S T U V W X Y Z – See also

Ichnogenus	Classification	Age Range	Location
Jialingpus	Theropod	161.2 to 145.5 Ma	China
Jurabrontes	Theropod	155.7 to 150.8 Ma	Switzerland

== K ==
Contents:	A B C D E F G H I J K L M N O P Q R S T U V W X Y Z – See also

Ichnogenus	Classification	Age Location	Location
Kayentapus	Theropod	221.5 to 155.7 Ma	Australia China Hungary Italy Japan Lesotho Morocco Poland Slovakia Sweden USA
Komlosaurus	Ornithischian	196.5 to 189.6 Ma	Hungary
Koreanosauripus	Sauropodomorph	Uncertain age	South Korea
Kuwajimasauropus	Theropod	145.5 to 140.2 Ma	Japan

== L ==
Contents:	A B C D E F G H I J K L M N O P Q R S T U V W X Y Z – See also

Ichnogenus	Classification	Age Range	Location
Ligabueichnium	Ankylosaur	84.9 to 70.6 Ma	Bolivia
Limayichnus	Iguanodontid	99.7 to 94.3 Ma	Argentina
Liujianpus	Sauropodomorph	201 to 174 Ma	China
Luluichnus	Stegosaur	140.2 to 125.45 Ma	Australia

== M ==
Contents:	A B C D E F G H I J K L M N O P Q R S T U V W X Y Z – See also

Ichnogenus	Classification	Age Range	Location
Macropodosaurus	Therizinosaur	105.3 to 70.6 Ma	Poland Tajikistan USA
Mafatrisauropus	Carnosaur	221.5 to 189.6 Ma	Lesotho
Magnoavipes	Non-avian coelurosaur	99.7 to 94.3 Ma	China USA
"Malakhelisaurus"	Nomen nudum	Middle Jurassic	Pakistan
Malutitrisauropus	Dinosauria?	182 to 180 Ma	South Africa
Megalosauripus	Theropod	201.6 to 125.45 Ma	Germany Morocco Portugal Spain Switzerland Tajikistan Turkmenistan USA
Megalosauropus	Carnosaur	125.45 to 99.7 Ma	Australia Croatia Portugal USA
Menglongipus	Theropod	145 Ma	China
Minisauripus	Theropod	125.45 to 99.7 Ma	China South Korea
Moraesichnium	Carnosaur	145.5 to 130.0 Ma	Brazil
Moyenisauropus	Ornithopod	201.6 to 196.5 Ma	Lesotho Poland

== N ==
Contents:	A B C D E F G H I J K L M N O P Q R S T U V W X Y Z – See also

Ichnogenus	Classification	Age Range	Location
Navahopus	Saurischian	189.6 to 175.6 Ma	USA
Neoanomoepus	Ornithopod	145.5 to 140.2 Ma	Canada Thailand
Neosauropus	Ornithopod	130 to 120 Ma	Portugal
Neotripodiscus	Non-avian coelurosaur	201.3 to 174.1 Ma	Lesotho

== O ==
Ichnogenus	Classification	Age Range	Location
Oobardjidama	Sauropod	140.2 to 125.45 Ma	Australia
Orcauichnites	Iguanodontid	70.6 to 66.043 Ma	Spain
Ornithomimipus	Non-avian coelurosaur	125.45 to 66.043 Ma	Canada Peru USA
Ornithopodichnites	Ornithopod	70.6 to 66.043 Ma	Spain
Ornithopodichnus	Iguanodontid	112.6 to 70.6 Ma	Poland South Korea
Otozoum	Sauropodomorph	221.5 to 175.6 Ma	Canada England Germany Lesotho USA

== P ==
Contents:	A B C D E F G H I J K L M N O P Q R S T U V W X Y Z – See also

Ichnogenus	Classification	Age Range	Location
Platysauropus	Saurischian?	201.4 to 192.9 Ma	Lesotho
Parabrontopodus	Sauropod	201.6 to 112.6 Ma	Chile China Croatia France Italy Poland Portugal Romania Spain Switzerland USA
Parachirotherium	Theropod	235.0 to 221.5 Ma	Germany
Paragrallator	Theropod	145.5 to 99.7 Ma	China
Pengxianpus	Theropoda	227.3 to 174.7 Ma	China
Platypterna	Saurischian	201.6 to 189.6 Ma	USA
Plesiornis	Theropod?	221.5 to 196.5 Ma	USA
Plesiothornipos	Theropod	235.0 to 201.6 Ma	England
Pseudotetrasauropus	Sauropodomorph	221.5 to 201.6 Ma	England Italy Lesotho USA
Pseudotrisauropus	Sauropodomorph?	196.5 to 189.6 Ma	Lesotho

== Q ==
Contents:	A B C D E F G H I J K L M N O P Q R S T U V W X Y Z – See also

Ichnogenus	Classification	Age Range	Location
Qomoqomosauropus	Dinosauria?	201.4 to 184.2 Ma	Lesotho

== R ==
Contents:	A B C D E F G H I J K L M N O P Q R S T U V W X Y Z – See also

Ichnogenus	Classification	Age Range	Location
Rotundichnus	Sauropod	145.5 to 140.2 Ma	Germany
Ruopodosaurus	Ankylosaurid	Cenomanian (Late Cretaceous)	Canada; South Korea

== S ==
Contents:	A B C D E F G H I J K L M N O P Q R S T U V W X Y Z – See also

Ichnogenus	Classification	Age Range	Location
Salfitichnus	Carnosaur	70.6 to 66.043 Ma	Argentina
Saltopoides	Theropoda	205.6 to 201.6 Ma	France
"Samanadrinda"	Nomen nudum	Middle Jurassic	Pakistan
Sarmientichnus	Ceratosaur?	164.7 to 155.7 Ma	Argentina
Satapliasaurus	Compsognathid?	175.6 to 130.0 Ma	England Georgia
Saurexallopus	Therizinosaur?	70.6 to 66.043 Ma	Poland USA
Saurichnium	Saurischian	201.6 to 175.6 Ma	Namibia
Sauropodichnus	Saurischian?	145.5 to 94.3 Ma	Argentina Spain
Sauropus	Theropod	201.6 to 196.5 Ma	USA
Seakatrisauropus	Sauropod?	201.6 to 189.6 Ma	Lesotho
Selenichnus	Theropod	201.6 to 196.5 Ma	USA
Senqutrisauropus	Sauropodomorph	237.0 to 205.7 Ma	Lesotho
Shenmuichnus	Ornithopod	201.6 to 175.6 Ma	China
Shiraminesauropus	Ornithopod	145.5 to 130.0 Ma	Japan
Siamopodus	Theropod	201.6 to 196.5 Ma	Thailand
Sillimanius	Saurischian?	201.6 to 189.6 Ma	USA
Sinoichnites	Saurischian?	175.6 to 161.2 Ma	China
Skartopus	Theropod	99.7 to 94.3 Ma	Australia
Sousaichnium	Iguanodontid	145.5 to 94.3 Ma	Argentina Brazil
Staurichnium	Ornithopod	145.5 to 130.0 Ma	Brazil
Stenonyx	Theropod	201.6 to 196.5 Ma	Poland USA
Stegopodus	Stegosaur	155 to 145 Ma	Denmark Morocco Poland Spain USA
Steropoides	Saurischian	201.6 to 196.5 Ma	USA

== T ==
Contents:	A B C D E F G H I J K L M N O P Q R S T U V W X Y Z – See also

Ichnogenus	Classification	Age Range	Location
Taponichnus	Hadrosaur	70.6 to 66.043 Ma	Argentina
Taupezia	Theropod	145.5 to 140.2 Ma	England
Telosichnus	Hadrosaur	70.6 to 66.043 Ma	Argentina
Teratopodus	Titanosaur	83.0 to 74.5 Ma	Argentina
Tetrapodium	Saurischian	201.6 to 175.6 Ma	Namibia
Tetrapodosaurus	Ankylosaur	112.6 to 94.3 Ma	Canada USA
Tetrasauropus	Sauropodomorph	235.0 to 217.9 Ma	Argentina Lesotho Switzerland USA
Therangospodus	Theropod	155.7 to 125.45 Ma	Argentina China Portugal Spain Turkmenistan USA
Titanopodus	Sauropod	74 to 70 Ma	Argentina
Tritotrisauropus	Saurischian?	237 to 227.3 Ma	Lesotho
Tuojiangpus	Theropod	175.6 to 161.2 Ma	China
Tyrannosauripus	Tyrannosaurid	70.6 to 66.043 Ma	USA
Tyrannosauropus	Hadrosaur	83.6 to 72.1 Ma	USA

== U ==
Contents:	A B C D E F G H I J K L M N O P Q R S T U V W X Y Z – See also

Ichnogenus	Classification	Age Range	Location
Ultrasauripus	Sauropod	121.4 to 113.2 Ma	South Korea

== V ==
Contents:	A B C D E F G H I J K L M N O P Q R S T U V W X Y Z – See also

Ichnogenus	Classification	Age Range	Location
Velociraptorichnus	Dromaeosaurid	125.45 to 70.6 Ma	China Poland

== W ==
Contents:	A B C D E F G H I J K L M N O P Q R S T U V W X Y Z – See also

Ichnogenus	Classification	Age Range	Location
Walmadanyichnus	Ornithischian	140.2 to 125.45 Ma	Australia
Wealdenichnites	Nomen dubium		Germany
Wildeichnus	Theropod	155.7 to 150.8 Ma	Argentina Poland
Wintonopus	Ornithopod	140.2 to 94.3 Ma	Australia

== X ==
Contents:	A B C D E F G H I J K L M N O P Q R S T U V W X Y Z – See also

Ichnogenus	Classification	Age Range	Location
Xiangxipus	Carnosaur	99.7 to 66.043 Ma	China
Xiuningpus	Compsognathid?	99.7 to 66.043 Ma	China

== Y ==
Contents:	A B C D E F G H I J K L M N O P Q R S T U V W X Y Z – See also

Ichnogenus	Classification	Age Range	Location
Yangtzepus	Theropod	140.2 to 125.45 Ma	Australia
Yunnanpus	Theropod?	94.3 to 85.8 Ma	China

== Z ==
Contents:	A B C D E F G H I J K L M N O P Q R S T U V W X Y Z – See also

== See also ==
- List of dinosaurs
- List of dinosaur oogenera
