= Trace fossil classification =

Systems for grouping fossilised evidence of biological activity

Trace fossils are classified in various ways for different purposes. Traces can be classified taxonomically (by morphology), ethologically (by behavior), and toponomically, that is, according to their relationship to the surrounding sedimentary layers. Except in the rare cases where the original maker of a trace fossil can be identified with confidence, phylogenetic classification of trace fossils is an unreasonable proposition.

== Taxonomic classification ==
The taxonomic classification of trace fossils parallels the taxonomic classification of organisms under the International Code of Zoological Nomenclature. In trace fossil nomenclature a Latin binomial name is used, just as in animal and plant taxonomy, with a genus and specific epithet. However, the binomial names are not linked to an organism, but rather just a trace fossil. This is due to the rarity of association between a trace fossil and a specific organism or group of organisms. Trace fossils are therefore included in an ichnotaxon separate from Linnaean taxonomy. When referring to trace fossils, the terms ichnogenus and ichnospecies parallel genus and species respectively.

The most promising cases of phylogenetic classification are those in which similar trace fossils show details complex enough to deduce the makers, such as bryozoan borings, large trilobite trace fossils such as Cruziana, and vertebrate footprints. However, most trace fossils lack sufficiently complex details to allow such classification.

== Ethologic classification ==
=== The Seilacherian System ===
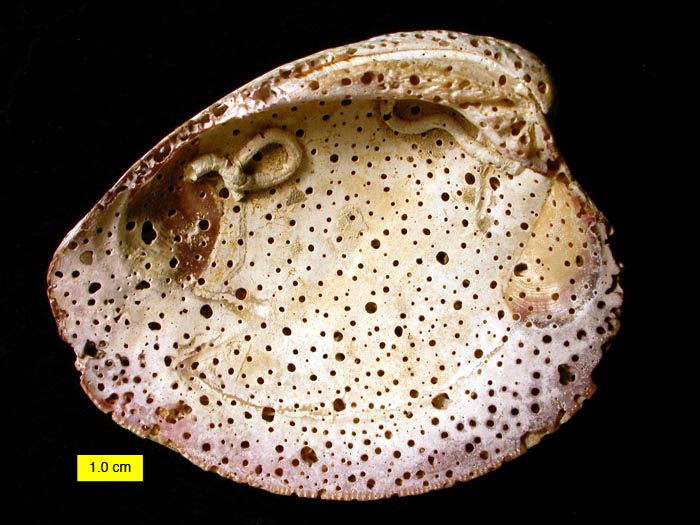
Sponge borings (Entobia) and encrusters on a modern bivalve shell, North Carolina; an example of Domichnia.

Adolf Seilacher was the first to propose a broadly accepted ethological basis for trace fossil classification. He recognized that most trace fossils are created by animals in one of five main behavioural activities, and named them accordingly:

- Cubichnia are the traces of organisms left on the surface of a soft sediment. This behaviour may simply be resting as in the case of a starfish, but might also evidence the hiding place of prey, or even the ambush position of a predator.
- Domichnia are dwelling structures that reflect the life positions of organisms, for example the burrows or borings of suspension feeders, and are perhaps the most common of the established ethological classes.
- Fodinichnia are feeding traces which are formed as a result of organisms disturbing the sediment in their search for food. They are normally created by deposit feeders as they tunnel through soft sediments, usually producing a 3D structure.
- Pascichnia are a different type of feeding trace for which the trophic guild responsible are grazers. They create 2D features as they scour the surface of a hard or soft substrate in order to obtain nutriment.
- Repichnia are locomotory tracks that show evidence of organisms moving from one station to another, usually in a near-straight to slightly curved line. Most of the very few traces to be verifiably assigned to a specific organism are in this category, such as various arthropod and vertebrate trackways.

=== Other ethological classes ===
Since the inception of behavioural categorization, several other ethological classes have been suggested and accepted, as follows:

- Aedificichnia: evidence of organisms building structures outside of the infaunal realm, such as termite mounds or wasp nests.
- Agrichnia: so called "gardening traces", which are systematic burrow networks designed to capture migrating meiofauna or perhaps even to culture bacteria. The organism would have continually inspected this burrow system to prey on any smaller organisms that strayed into it.
- Calichnia: structures that were created by organisms specifically for breeding purposes, e.g. bee cells.
- Equilibrichnia: burrows within the sediment that show evidence for organisms' responses to variations in sedimentation rate (i.e. the burrow moves upwards to avoid burial, or downwards to avoid exposure). Typically this evidence will be in the form of spreiten, which are small laminations in the sediment that reflect previous positions the organisms were in.
- Fugichnia: "escape traces" that are formed as a result of organisms' attempts to escape burial in sudden high-sedimentation events like turbidity currents. The burrows are often marked with chevron patterns showing the upward direction the organisms were tunnelling.
- Praedichnia: trace fossils that show evidence of predatory behaviour, such as the drill holes (borings) left in shells by carnivorous gastropods, or more dramatically, the bite marks found on some vertebrate bones.

Over the years several other behavioural groups have been proposed, but in general they have been quickly discarded by the ichnological community. Some of the failed proposals are listed below, with a brief description.

- Chemichnia: a type of agrichnia applied specifically to those instances of bacterial harvesting.
- Cecidoichnia: a plant trace in which a gall is left on the plant as a result of interaction with animals, bacteria, or other plants.
- Corrosichnia: traces that are left by plant roots as a result of their corrosive action on the sediments.
- Cursichnia: a subgroup of the repichnia, created by a crawling or walking habit.
- Fixichnia: traces left by sessile organisms that anchored themselves to a hard substrate.
- Mordichnia: a praedichnial subgroup that shows evidence of the prey's death as a result of the attack.
- Natichnia: a type of repichnia caused by disturbances to a soft sediment by a swimming organism, e.g. a benthic fish.
- Polychresichnia: traces that show an origin in the combination of two or more established trace-producing behaviours, e.g. domichnia that served as the feeding position of the organisms.
- Sphenoichnia: a plant trace created by the bioturbational action of roots.
- Taphichnia: fugichnia in which the organism failed to escape and was buried, often resulting in its body fossil being found in association with the trace.
- Volichnia: traces that show the position a flying organism (usually an insect) landed on a soft sediment.

Fixichnia is perhaps the group with the most weight as a candidate for the next accepted ethological class, being not fully described by any of the eleven currently accepted categories. There is also potential for the three plant traces (cecidoichnia, corrosichnia and sphenoichnia) to gain recognition in coming years, with little attention having been paid to them since their proposal.

== Toponomic classification ==
Another way to classify trace fossils is to look at their relation to the sediment of origin. Martinsson has provided the most widely accepted of such systems, identifying four distinct classes for traces to be separated in this regard:

- Endichnia are those traces that are found wholly within the casting medium, and therefore can only have been made by an infaunal organism.
- Epichnia are found on the tops of the strata of origin, being those ridges and grooves that were formed by benthic organisms or infaunal burrows that have been exposed by erosion.
- Exichnia are traces that are made of material that is different from the surrounding medium, having either been actively filled by an organism or eroded out and re-covered by an alien sediment.
- Hypichnia are ridges and grooves found on the soles of the beds of origin at their interfaces with other strata, representing the opposite of epichnia.

Other classifications have been proposed, but none stray far from the above.

== History ==
Early paleontologists originally classified many burrow fossils as the remains of marine algae, as is apparent in ichnogenera named with the -phycus suffix. Alfred Gabriel Nathorst and Joseph F. James both controversially challenged this incorrect classification, suggesting the reinterpretation of many "algae" as marine invertebrate trace fossils.

Several attempts to classify trace fossils have been made throughout the history of paleontology. In 1844, Edward Hitchcock proposed two orders: Apodichnites, including footless trails, and Polypodichnites, including trails of organisms with more than four feet.

== See also ==
- Ichnology
- Trace fossil
