= List of the prehistoric life of Massachusetts =

This list of the prehistoric life of Massachusetts contains the various prehistoric life-forms whose fossilized remains have been reported from within the US state of Massachusetts.

== Precambrian ==
The Paleobiology Database records no known occurrences of Precambrian fossils in Massachusetts.

== Paleozoic ==
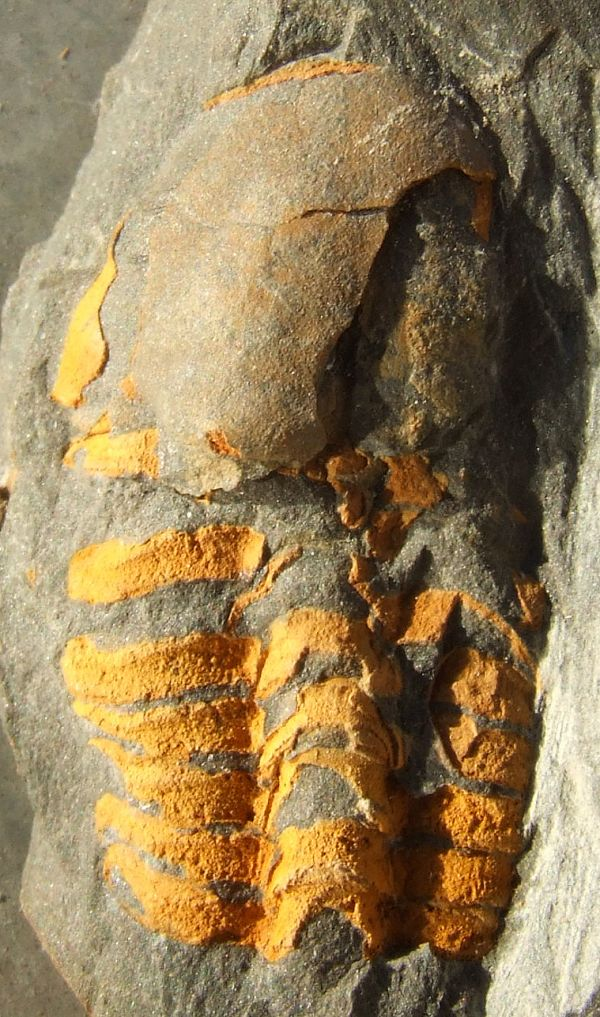
- Fossil of the Cambrian trilobite Agraulos
  †Agraulos – report made of unidentified related form or using admittedly obsolete nomenclature
  - †Agraulos quadrangularis
- †Aldanella
  - †Aldanella attleborensis
- †Allatheca – report made of unidentified related form or using admittedly obsolete nomenclature
  - †Allatheca degeeri – broadly construed
- †Anabarites
  - †Anabarites korobovi
- †Bemella
  - †Bemella bella
- †Braintreella
  - †Braintreella rogersi
- †Calodiscus
  - †Calodiscus lobatus
- †Camenella
  - †Camenella baltica – tentative report
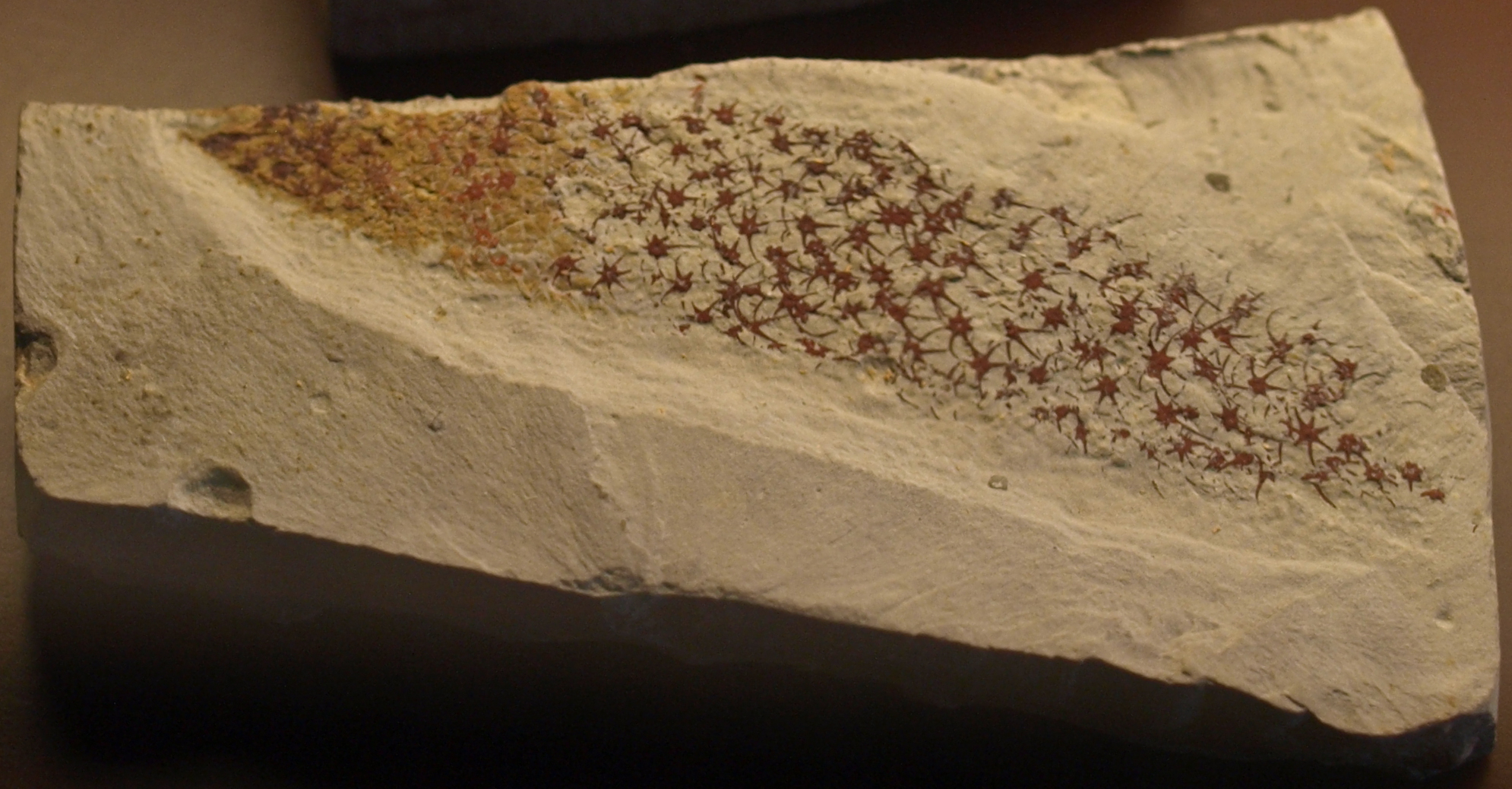
- Fossil of Chancelloria
  †Chancelloria
- †Coleoloides
  - †Coleoloides typicalis
- †Condylopyge
- †Conotheca
  - †Conotheca subcurvata
- †Dawsonia
  - †Dawsonia dawsoni – or unidentified comparable form
- †Dipharus
  - †Dipharus attleborensis
- †Dromopus – tentative report
  - †Dromopus woodworthi – type locality for species
- †Eccentrotheca
  - †Eccentrotheca kanesia
- †Fomitchella
  - †Fomitchella infundabiliformis
- †Gracilitheca
  - †Gracilitheca bayonet
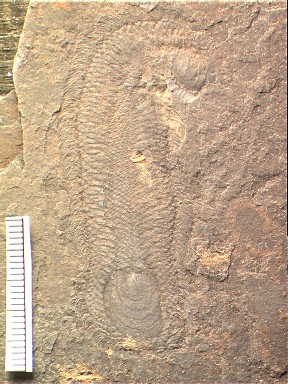
- Fossil of the Cambrian mollusc Halkieria.
  †Halkieria
- †Hyolithellus
  - †Hyolithellus micans – or unidentified related form
- †Hyolithes
  - †Hyolithes tenuistriatus – broadly construed
- †Kingaspis
  - †Kingaspis avalonensis
- †Ladatheca – report made of unidentified related form or using admittedly obsolete nomenclature
  - †Ladatheca cylindrica
- †Lapworthella
  - †Lapworthella laudvigseni
  - †Lapworthella ludvigseni
- †Leptostega
  - †Leptostega abrupta
- †Linguella
  - †Linguella viridis
- †Mellopegma – tentative report
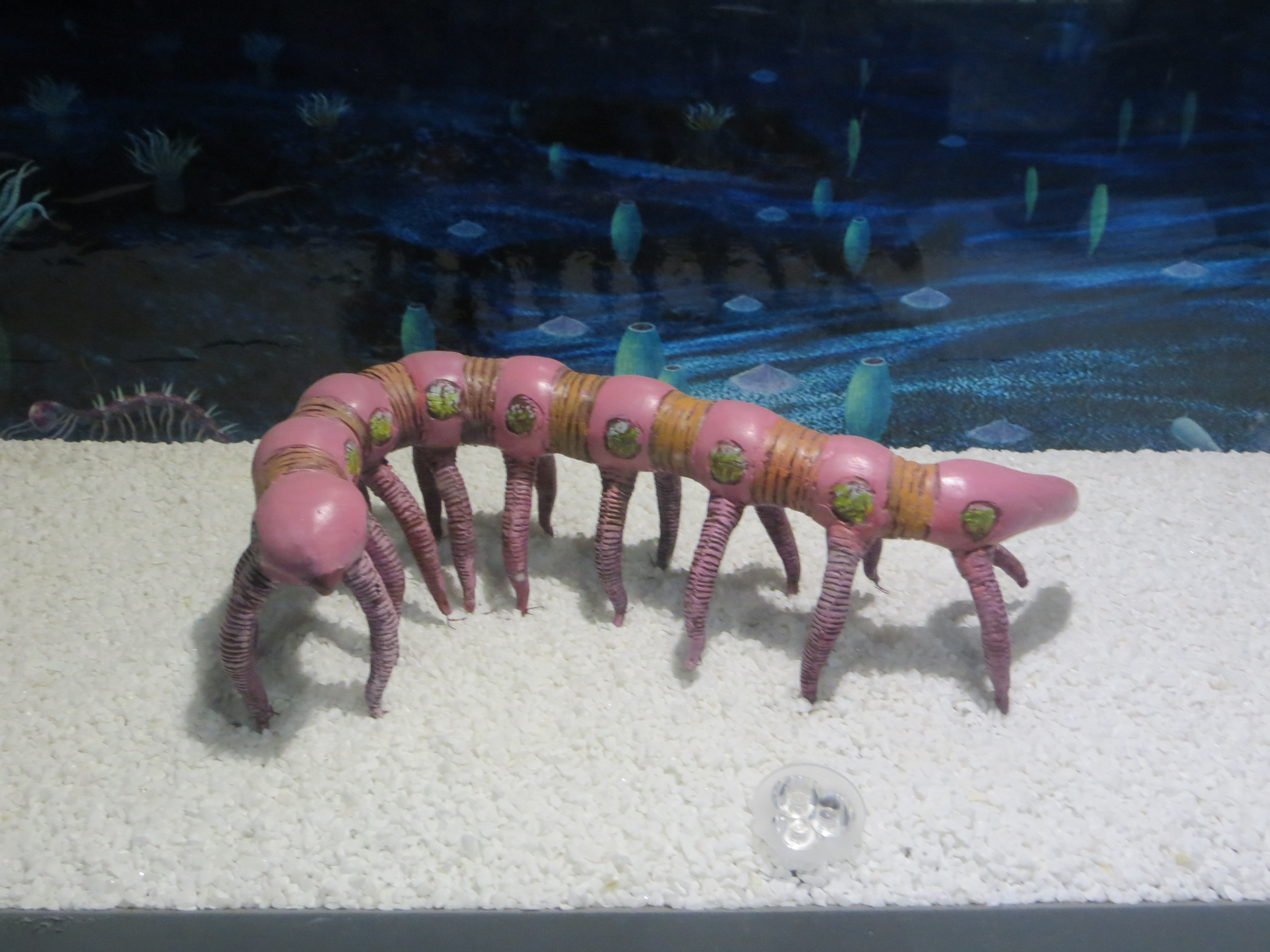
- Restorative model of Microdictyon.
  †Microdictyon
- †Obolella
  - †Obolella atlantica
- †Obolus
  - †Obolus parvulus – tentative report
- †Onchocephalites
  - †Onchocephalites permingeati
- †Paradoxides
  - †Paradoxides harlani
- †Pelagiella
- †Plinthokonion
  - †Plinthokonion arethion
- †Rhombocorniculum
  - †Rhombocorniculum cancellatum
- †Scenella
  - †Scenella reticulata
- †Serrodiscus
  - †Serrodiscus bellimarginatus
- †Sokolovitheca
  - †Sokolovitheca sokolovi
- †Stenotheca – report made of unidentified related form or using admittedly obsolete nomenclature
  - †Stenotheca acutacosta
- †Sunnaginia
  - †Sunnaginia imbricata
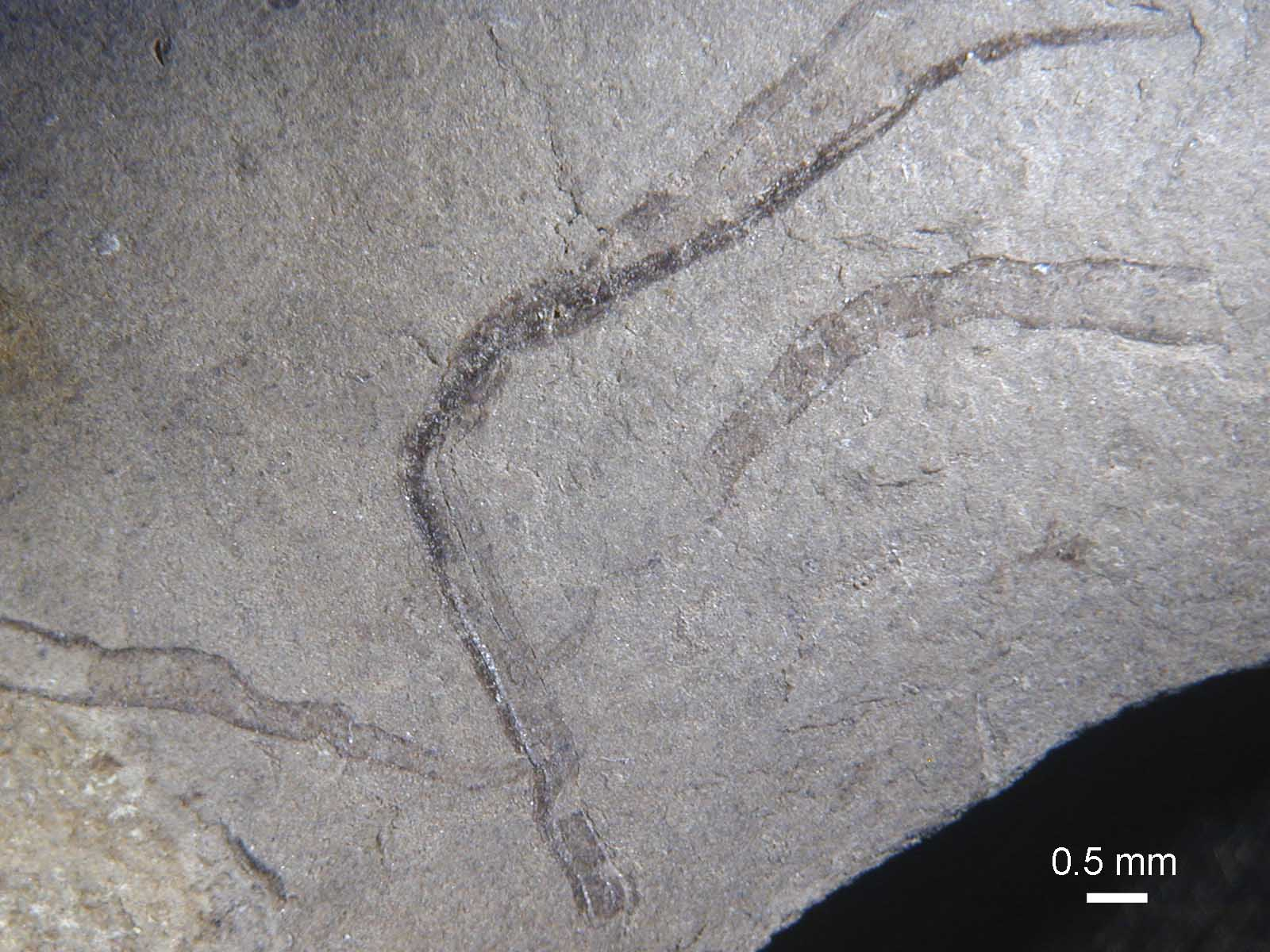
- Fossil of the mysterious Cambrian animal Torellella
  †Torellella
  - †Torellella laevigata
- †Watsonella
  - †Watsonella crosbyi

== Mesozoic ==
This list of the Mesozoic life of Massachusetts contains the various prehistoric life-forms whose fossilized remains have been reported from within the US state of Massachusetts and are between 252.17 and 66 million years of age.

=== A ===
- †Acanthichnus
  - †Acanthichnus aguineus – type locality for species
  - †Acanthichnus alternans – type locality for species
  - †Acanthichnus cursorius
  - †Acanthichnus saltatorius
  - †Acanthichnus trilinearis
- †Acteonella
- †Aenigmichnus
  - †Aenigmichnus multiformis
- †Amblonyx – type locality for genus
  - †Amblonyx giganteus – type locality for species
  - †Amblonyx lyellianus
- †Amblypus – type locality for genus
  - †Amblypus dextratus – type locality for species
- †Ammopus – type locality for genus
  - †Ammopus marshi – type locality for species
- †Ampelichnus
  - †Ampelichnus sulcatus
- †Anchisauripus
  - †Anchisauripus exsertus – type locality for species
  - †Anchisauripus hitchcocki – type locality for species
  - †Anchisauripus minusculum – type locality for species
  - †Anchisauripus minusculus
  - †Anchisauripus parallelus
  - †Anchisauripus sillimani
  - †Anchisauripus tuberosus – type locality for species
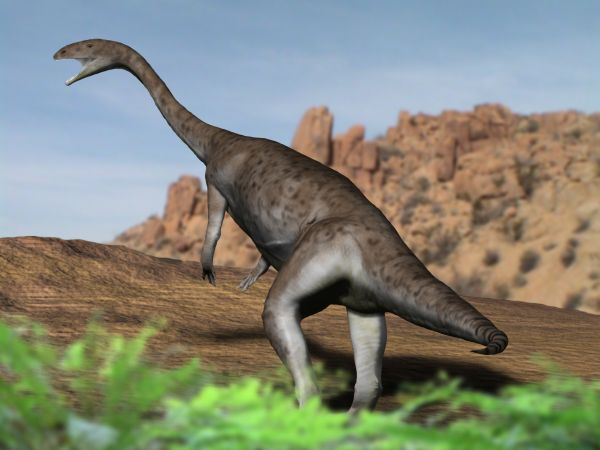
- Restoration of the Early Jurassic sauropodomorph dinosaur Anchisaurus
  †Anchisaurus – type locality for genus
  - †Anchisaurus polyzelus – type locality for species
- †Ancyropus
  - †Ancyropus heteroclitus
- †Anomoepus
  - †Anomoepus crassus
  - †Anomoepus cuneatus – type locality for species
  - †Anomoepus curvatus – type locality for species
  - †Anomoepus gracillimus – type locality for species
  - †Anomoepus intermedius – type locality for species
  - †Anomoepus isodactylus – type locality for species
  - †Anomoepus major – type locality for species
  - †Anomoepus minimus – type locality for species
  - †Anomoepus scambus – type locality for species
- †Anticheiropus – type locality for genus
  - †Anticheiropus hamatus – type locality for species
  - †Anticheiropus pilulatus – type locality for species
- †Antipus
  - †Antipus bifidus – type locality for species
- †Apatichnus – type locality for genus
  - †Apatichnus circumagens – type locality for species
- †Arachnichnus
  - †Arachnichnus dehiscens – type locality for species
- †Argoides
  - †Argoides macrodactylus
  - †Argoides minimus – type locality for species
  - †Argoides redfieldianum – tentative report
  - †Argoides redfieldii – type locality for species

=== B ===
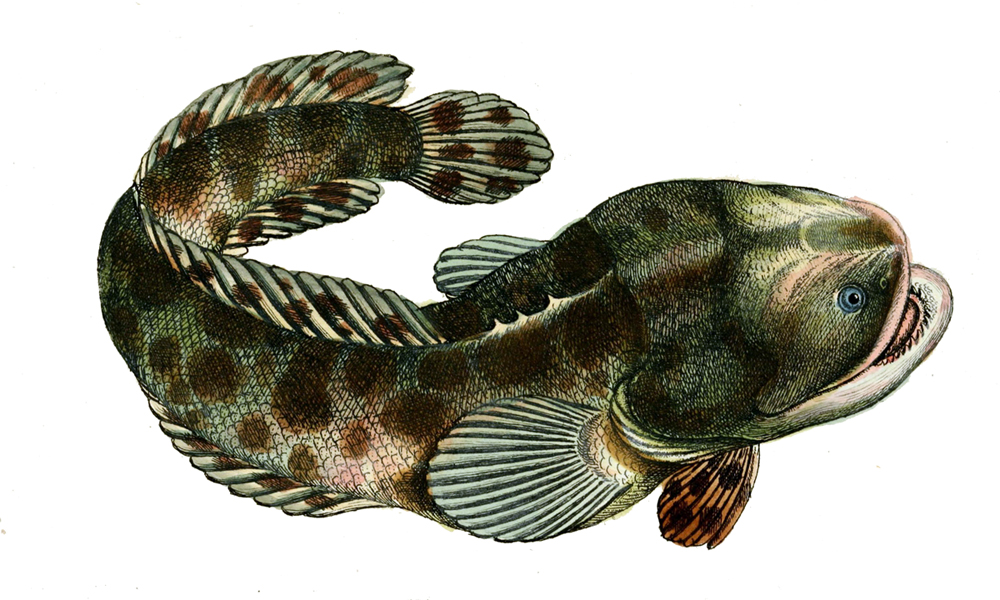
- Illustration of a living Batrachoides toadfish
  †Batrachoides
  - †Batrachoides nidificans
- †Batrachopus – type locality for genus
  - †Batrachopus bellus – type locality for species
  - †Batrachopus deweyi – type locality for species
  - †Batrachopus dispar – type locality for species
  - †Batrachopus gracilis – type locality for species
  - †Batrachopus vuigaris
- †Bifurculipes
  - †Bifurculipes curvatus
  - †Bifurculipes elachistotatus
  - †Bifurculipes laqueatus
  - †Bifurculipes scolopendroideus
- †Bisulcus
  - †Bisulcus undulatus – type locality for species
- †Brontozoum
  - †Brontozoum approximatum
  - †Brontozoum divaricatum – type locality for species
  - †Brontozoum giganteum – type locality for species
  - †Brontozoum isodactylum
  - †Brontozoum parallelum – type locality for species
  - †Brontozoum sillimanium
  - †Brontozoum tuberatum – type locality for species

=== C ===
- †Chalthropteris
- †Clathropteris
- †Climacodichnus
  - †Climacodichnus corrigatus – type locality for species
- †Cochlichnus
  - †Cochlichnus anguineus
- †Conopsoides
  - †Conopsoides curtus – type locality for species
  - †Conopsoides larvalis
- †Copeza
  - †Copeza archimedea
  - †Copeza cruscularis
  - †Copeza propinquata
  - †Copeza punctata
  - †Copeza triremus
- †Corvipes – type locality for genus
  - †Corvipes lacertoideus – type locality for species
- †Cunichnoides – type locality for genus
  - †Cunichnoides marsupialoideus – type locality for species
- †Cunicularius
  - †Cunicularius retrahens

=== E ===
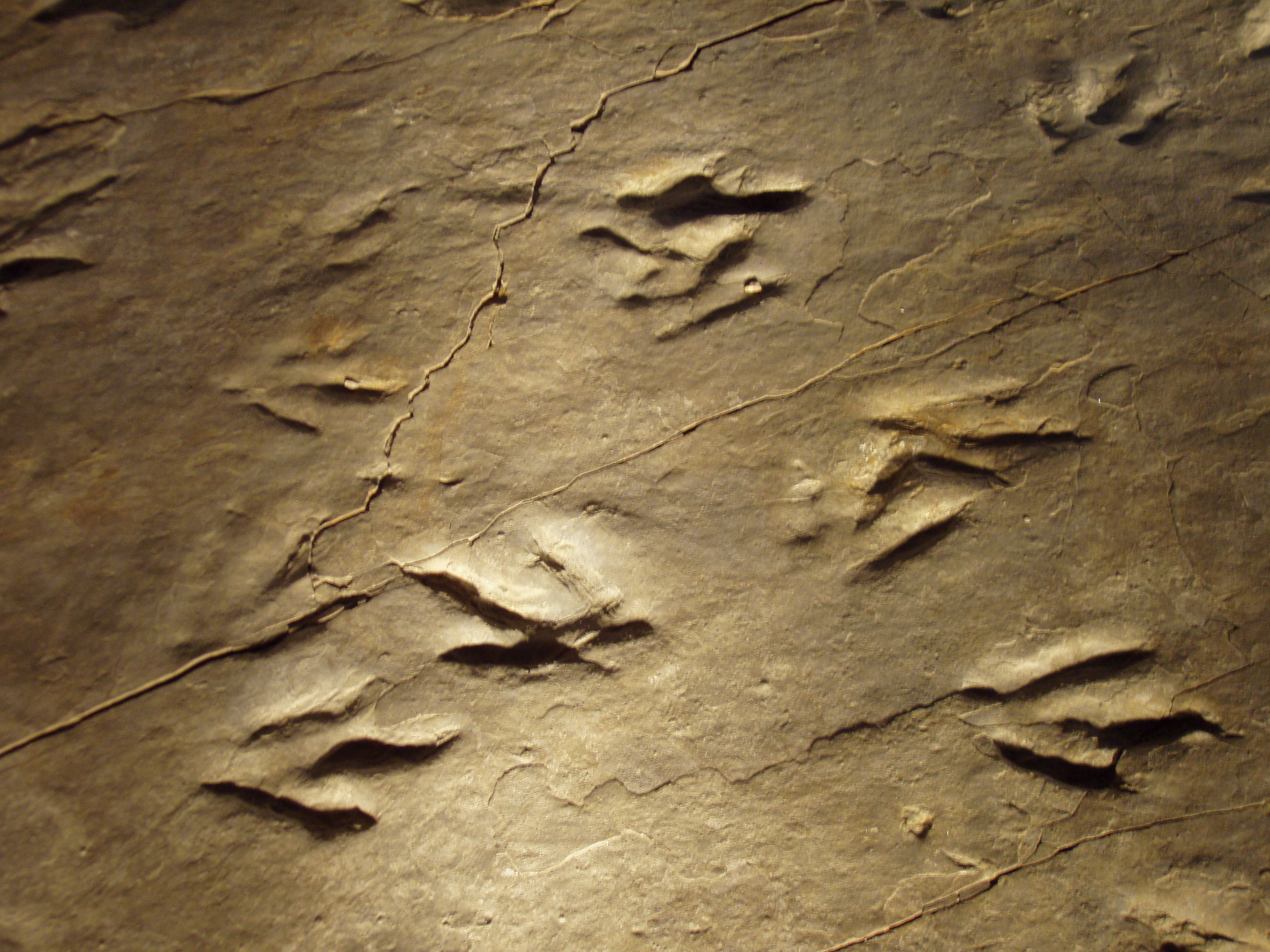
- Fossils of the large theropod dinosaur footprint ichnogenus Eubrontes
  †Eubrontes
  - †Eubrontes divaricatus
- †Eupalamopus – type locality for genus
  - †Eupalamopus dananus – type locality for species

=== G ===
- †Gigandipus – type locality for genus
  - †Gigandipus caudatus – type locality for species
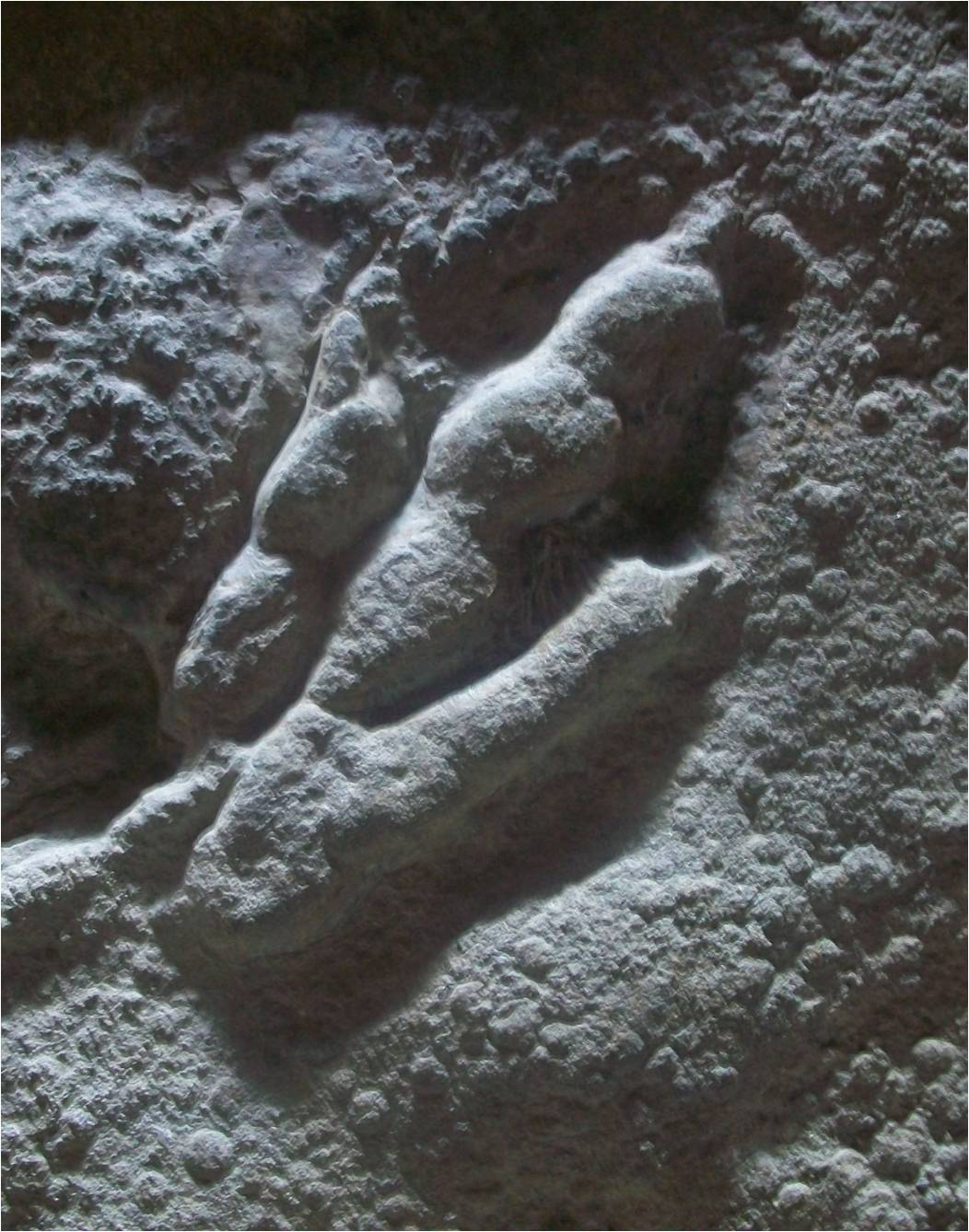
- Fossil negative with skin impressions of the theropod dinosaur footprint ichnogenus Grallator
  †Grallator – type locality for genus
  - †Grallator cuneatus – type locality for species
  - †Grallator cursorius – type locality for species
  - †Grallator formosus – type locality for species
  - †Grallator gracilis – type locality for species
  - †Grallator magnificus – type locality for species
  - †Grallator parallelus – type locality for species
  - †Grallator sillimaniium – tentative report
  - †Grallator tenuis – type locality for species
- †Grammepus
  - †Grammepus erismatus
  - †Grammepus uniordinatus
- †Grammichnus
  - †Grammichnus alpha

=== H ===
- †Halysichnus
  - †Halysichnus laqueatus
- †Harpagopus
  - †Harpagopus dubius
- †Harpedactylus
  - †Harpedactylus crassus – type locality for species
  - †Harpedactylus gracilior – type locality for species
  - †Harpedactylus tenuissimus – type locality for species
- †Harpepus
  - †Harpepus capillaris
- †Helcura
  - †Helcura anguinea – type locality for species
  - †Helcura littoralis – type locality for species
  - †Helcura surgens – type locality for species
- †Henrisporites
  - †Henrisporites angustus – type locality for species
- †Herpystezoum
  - †Herpystezoum intermedius
  - †Herpystezoum marshi
  - †Herpystezoum minutus
- †Hexapodichnus
  - †Hexapodichnus horreus
  - †Hexapodichnus magnus
- †Holcoptera
  - †Holcoptera giebeli
- †Hoplichnus – type locality for genus
  - †Hoplichnus equus – type locality for species
  - †Hoplichnus quadrupedans – type locality for species
- †Hyphepus – type locality for genus
  - †Hyphepus fieldi – type locality for species

=== I ===
- †Isocampe – type locality for genus
  - †Isocampe strata – type locality for species

=== K ===
- †Kayentapus
  - †Kayentapus minor – type locality for species

=== L ===
- †Lagunculapes – type locality for genus
  - †Lagunculapes latus – type locality for species
- †Lunula
  - †Lunula obscura

=== M ===
- †Mormolucoides – type locality for genus
  - †Mormolucoides articulatus – type locality for species

=== O ===
- †Ornithichnites – type locality for genus
  - †Ornithichnites giganteus – type locality for species
- †Ornithoidichnites
  - †Ornithoidichnites cuneatus – type locality for species
  - †Ornithoidichnites giganteus
  - †Ornithoidichnites lyellii – type locality for species
- †Ornithopus
  - †Ornithopus adamsanus – type locality for species
- †Otouphepus
  - †Otouphepus minor – type locality for species
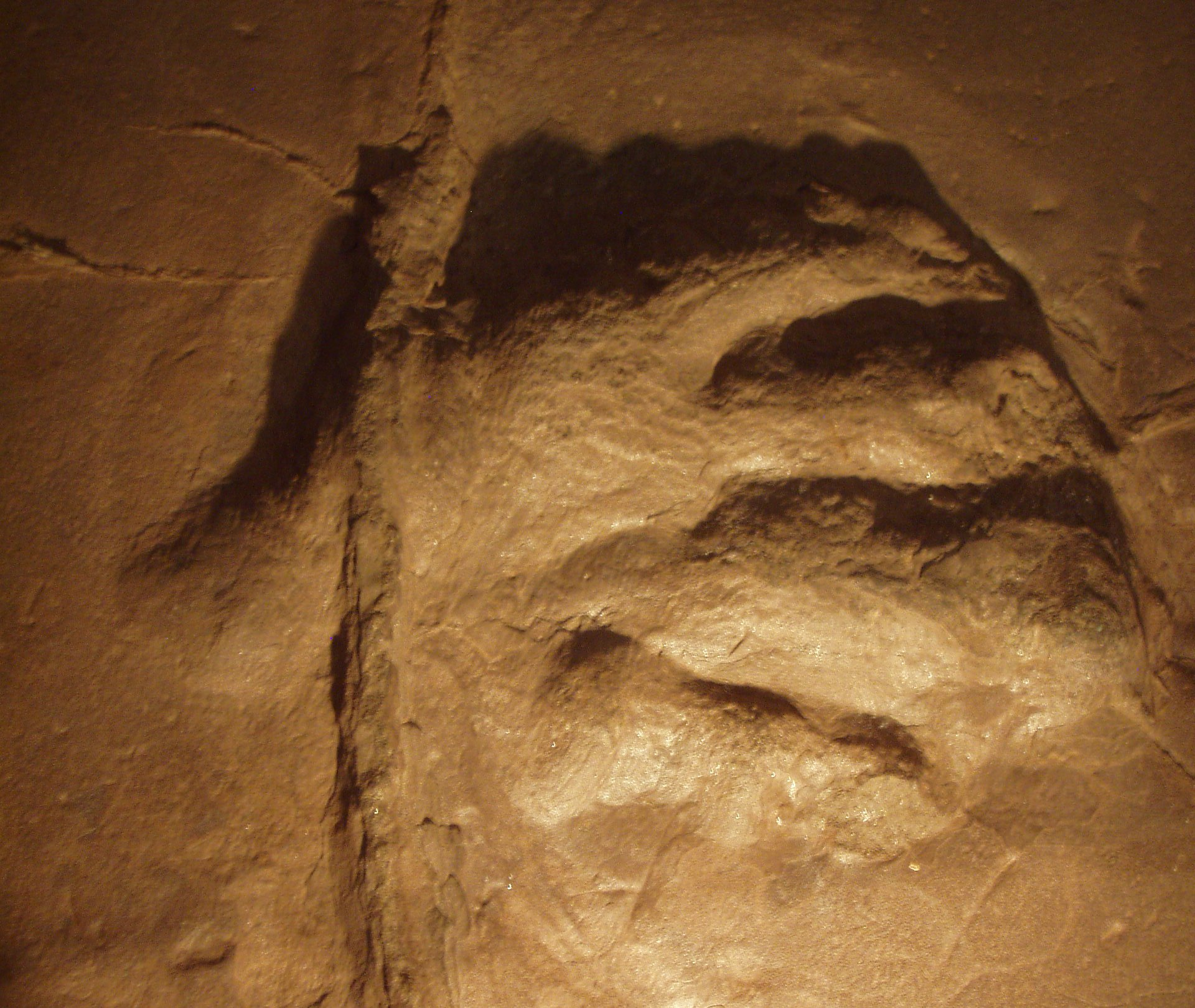
- Fossil from Dinosaur State Park and Arboretum of the Late Triassic-Middle Jurassic sauropodomorph dinosaur footprint ichnogenus Otozoum
  †Otozoum – type locality for genus
  - †Otozoum minus – type locality for species
  - †Otozoum moodii – type locality for species

=== P ===
- †Palaephemera
  - †Palaephemera mediaeva
- †Palamopus
  - †Palamopus divaricans
- †Paxillitriletes
  - †Paxillitriletes dakotaensis
- †Pityostrobus
  - †Pityostrobus kayei – type locality for species
- †Platypterna
  - †Platypterna concamerata – type locality for species
  - †Platypterna deanii
  - †Platypterna digitigrada – type locality for species
  - †Platypterna gracillima – type locality for species
  - †Platypterna recta – type locality for species
  - †Platypterna varica – type locality for species
- †Plectropterna
  - †Plectropterna gracilis – type locality for species
  - †Plectropterna lineans
  - †Plectropterna minitans
- †Plesiornis – type locality for genus
  - †Plesiornis pilulatus – type locality for species
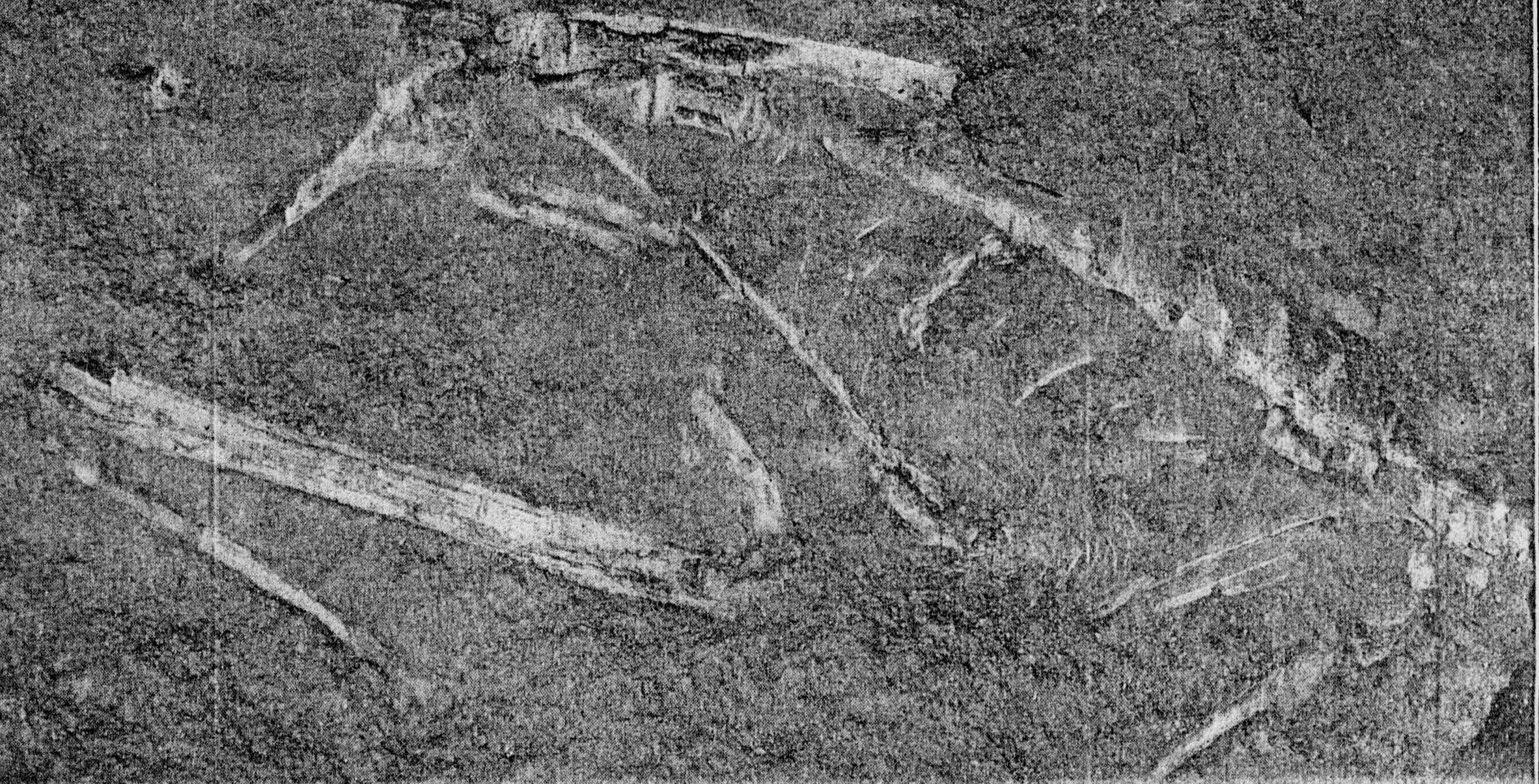
- Fossilized partial skeleton of the Early Jurassic theropod dinosaur Podokesaurus
  †Podokesaurus – type locality for genus
  - †Podokesaurus holyokensis – type locality for species
- †Polemarchus – type locality for genus
  - †Polemarchus gigas – type locality for species
- †Pseudoaraucaria
  - †Pseudoaraucaria arnoldii – type locality for species
- †Pterichnus
  - †Pterichnus centipes
- †Ptilichnus – type locality for genus
  - †Ptilichnus anomalus – type locality for species
  - †Ptilichnus hydrodromus – type locality for species
  - †Ptilichnus pectinatus – type locality for species
  - †Ptilichnus typographus – type locality for species

=== S ===
- †Sagittarius
  - †Sagittarius alternans
- †Saltator
  - †Saltator bipedatus – type locality for species
  - †Saltator caudatus – type locality for species
- †Sauropus
  - †Sauropus barrattii – type locality for species
- †Selenichnus
  - †Selenichnus breviusculus – type locality for species
  - †Selenichnus falcatus – type locality for species
- †Sillimanius
  - †Sillimanius gracilior
  - †Sillimanius tetradactylus
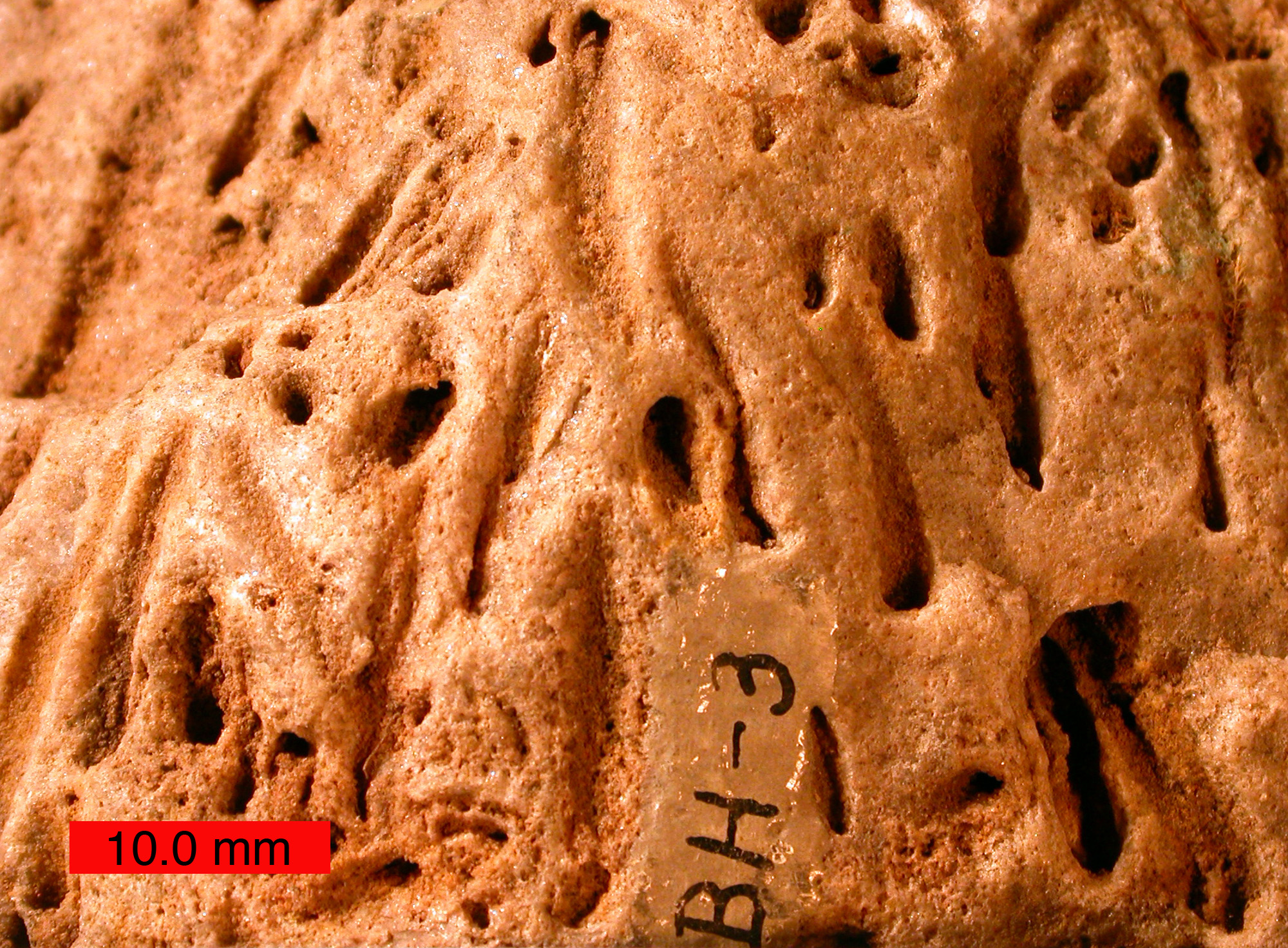
- Fossils of the Cambrian-modern worm burrow ichnogenus Skolithos
  †Skolithos
- †Sphaerapus
  - †Sphaerapus larvalis
  - †Sphaerapus magnus
- †Stegomus
  - †Stegomus longipes – type locality for species
- †Stenonyx
  - †Stenonyx lateralis – type locality for species
- †Steropezoum
  - †Steropezoum elegantius
- †Steropoides
  - †Steropoides divaricatus – type locality for species
  - †Steropoides diversus – type locality for species
  - †Steropoides elegans – type locality for species
  - †Steropoides infelix – type locality for species
  - †Steropoides ingens – type locality for species
  - †Steropoides loripes – type locality for species
  - †Steropoides uncus – type locality for species
- †Stratipes – type locality for genus
  - †Stratipes latus – type locality for species

=== T ===
- †Tarsodactylus – type locality for genus
  - †Tarsodactylus caudatus – type locality for species
  - †Tarsodactylus expansus – type locality for species
- †Tarsoplectrus
  - †Tarsoplectrus angustus – type locality for species
- †Toxichnus – type locality for genus
  - †Toxichnus inaequalis – type locality for species
- †Triaenopus
  - †Triaenopus baileyanus
- †Trihamus – type locality for genus
  - †Trihamus elegans – type locality for species
- Trisulcus
  - †Trisulcus laqueatus
- †Typopus – type locality for genus
  - †Typopus abnormis – type locality for species

=== X ===
- †Xiphopeza – type locality for genus
  - †Xiphopeza triplex – type locality for species

== Cenozoic ==
This list of the Cenozoic life of Massachusetts contains the various prehistoric life-forms whose fossilized remains have been reported from within the US state of Massachusetts and are between 66 million and 10,000 years of age.

=== A ===
- Aligena
  - †Aligena elevata
- Anadara
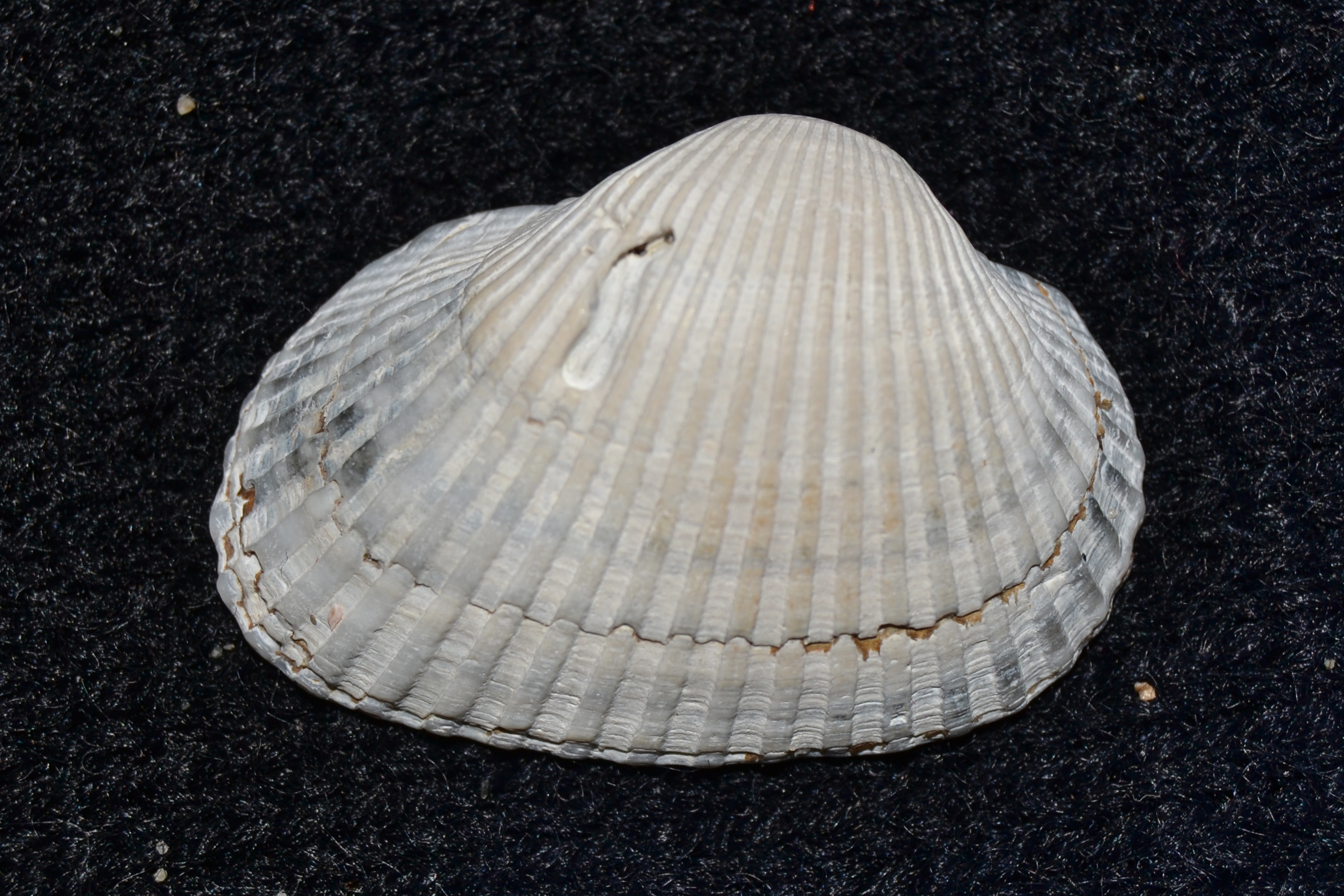
  - Shell of an Anadara transversa, or transverse ark clam
    †Anadara transversa
- Angulus
  - †Angulus agilis
- Anomia
  - †Anomia paucistriata
  - †Anomia simplexiformis
- Astarte
  - †Astarte castanea
  - †Astarte crenata
  - †Astarte undata
- Astyris
  - †Astyris lunata

=== B ===
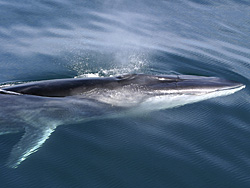
- Portrait of a living Balaenoptera baleen whale
  Balaenoptera
  - †Balaenoptera sursiplana – tentative report
- Balanus
  - †Balanus crenatus
- Boonea
  - †Boonea impressa
- Brachidontes
  - †Brachidontes vineyardensis
- Buccinum
  - †Buccinum undatum

=== C ===
- Callinectes
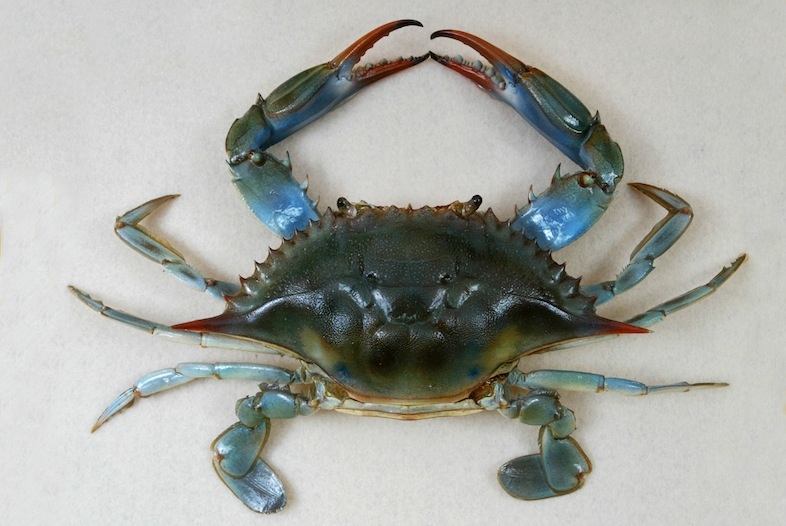
  - A living Callinectes sapidus, or Chesapeake blue crab
    †Callinectes sapidus
- †Callophoca
  - †Callophoca obscura
- Cardium
- Caryocorbula
  - †Caryocorbula contracta
- Cliona
  - †Cliona sulphurea
- Colus
  - †Colus stimpsoni
- Corymbites
  - †Corymbites aethiops
- Crassostrea
  - †Crassostrea virginica
- Crenella
  - †Crenella glandula
- Crepidula
  - †Crepidula fornicata
  - †Crepidula plana
- Cumingia
  - †Cumingia tellinoides
- †Cuneocorbula
  - †Cuneocorbula whitfieldi
- Cyclocardia
  - †Cyclocardia borealis
  - †Cyclocardia novangliae
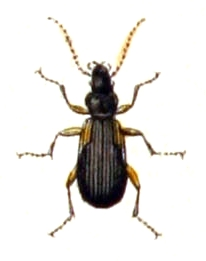
- Illustration of a living Cymindis ground beetle
  Cymindis
  - †Cymindis extorpescens – type locality for species

=== D ===
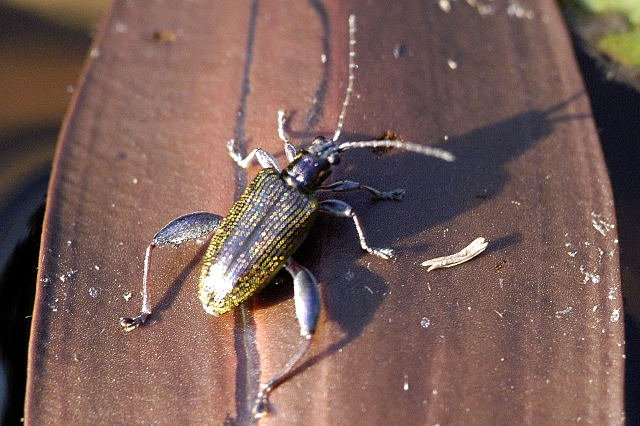
- A living Donacia leaf beetle
  Donacia
  - †Donacia elongatula – type locality for species

=== E ===
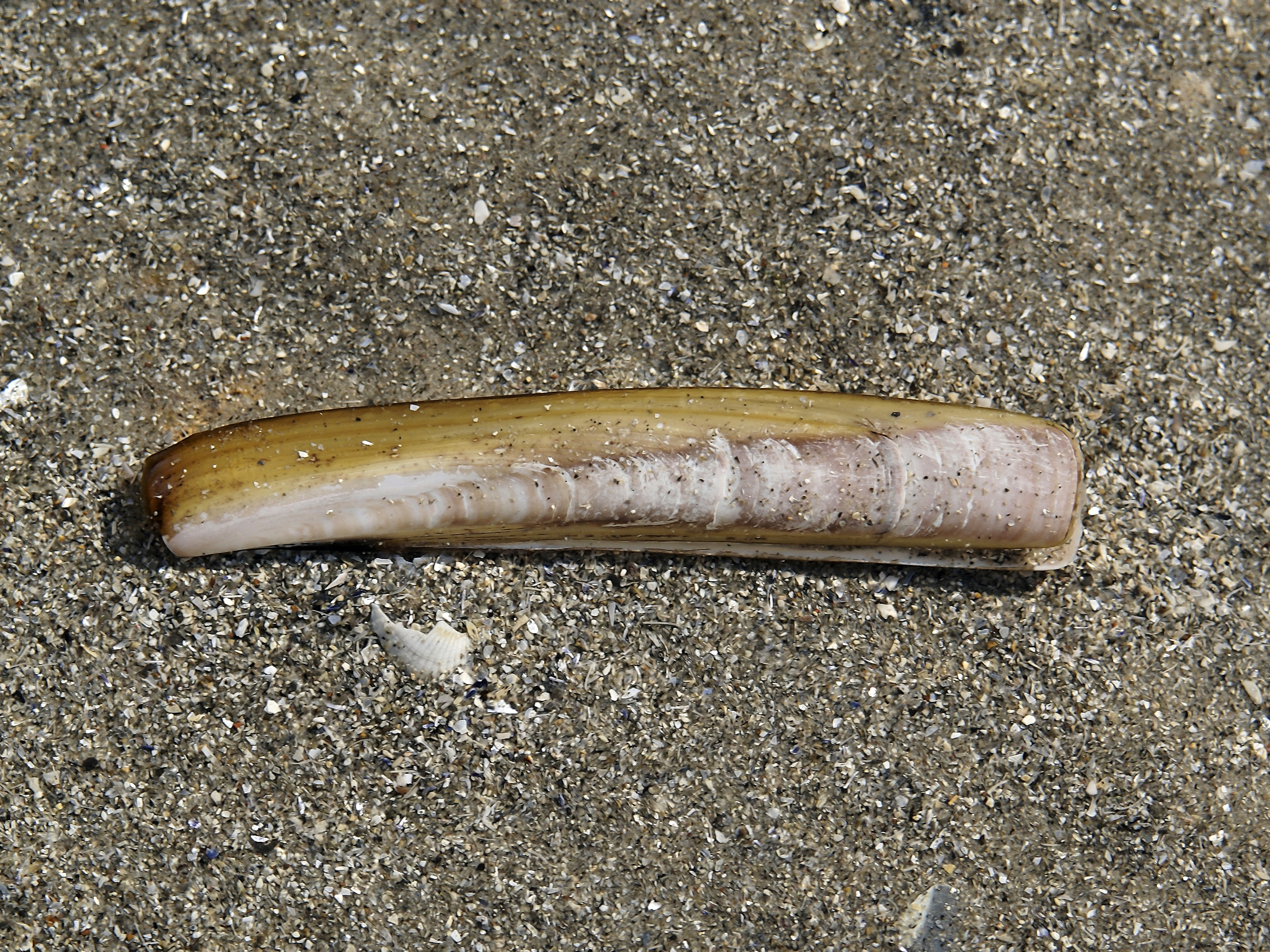
- Interior of the shell of an Ensis leei, or Atlantic jackknife clam
  Ensis
  - †Ensis directus
- Eontia
  - †Eontia ponderosa
- Equus
- Eupleura
  - †Eupleura caudata

=== G ===
- Gemma
  - †Gemma gemma
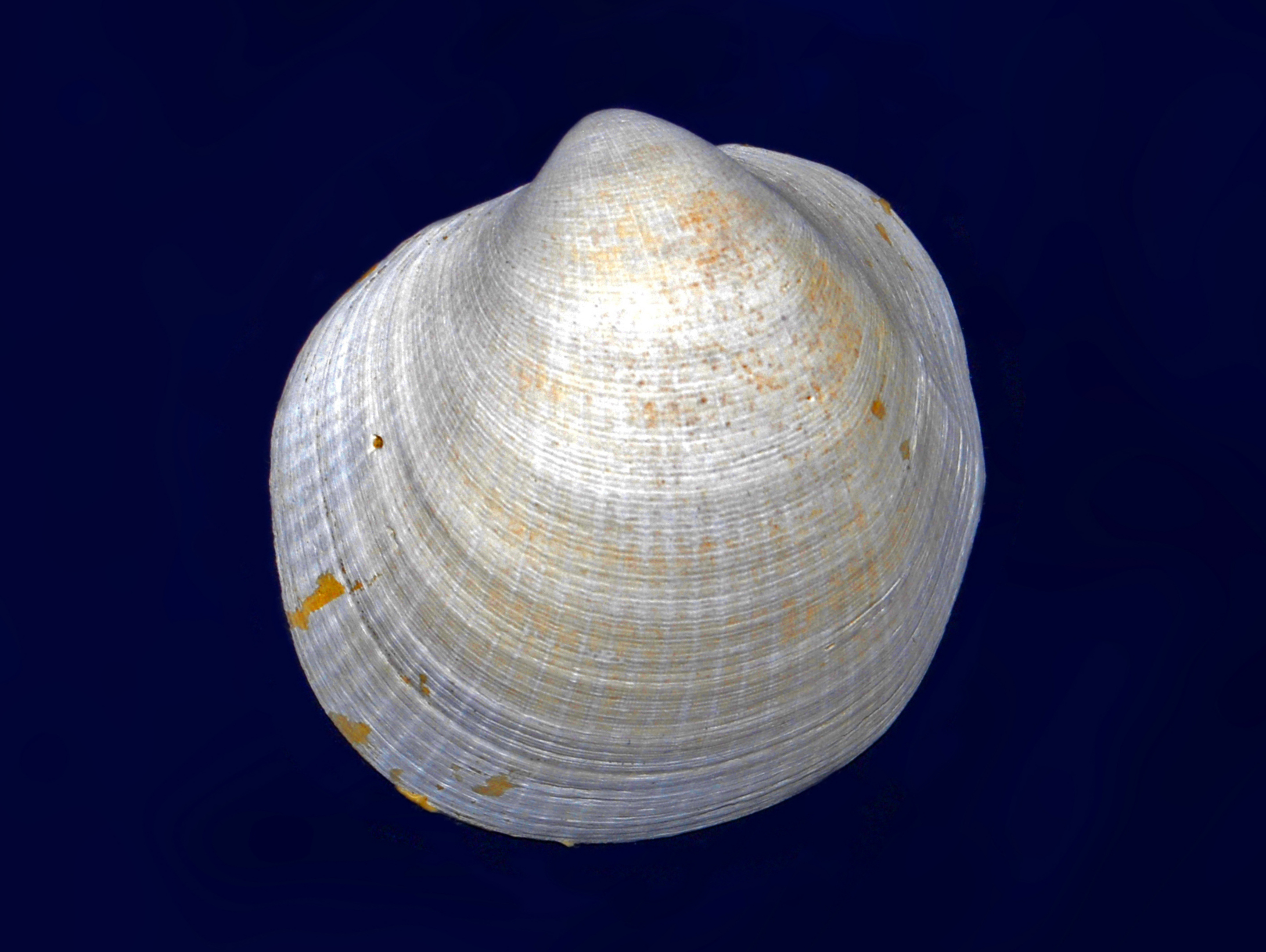
- Fossilized shell of a Glycymeris, or bittersweet clam
  Glycymeris
  - †Glycymeris wrigleyi – or unidentified related form

=== H ===
- Hemimactra
  - †Hemimactra solidissima

=== I ===
- Ilyanassa
  - †Ilyanassa obsoleta
  - †Ilyanassa trivittata
- Ischadium
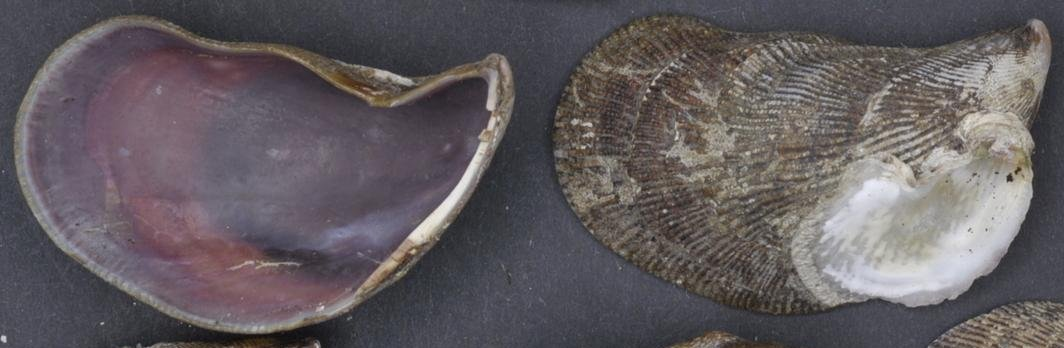
  - Shells of Ischadium recurvum, or hooked mussels
    †Ischadium recurvum

=== M ===
- Macoma
  - †Macoma balthica
- †Mammut
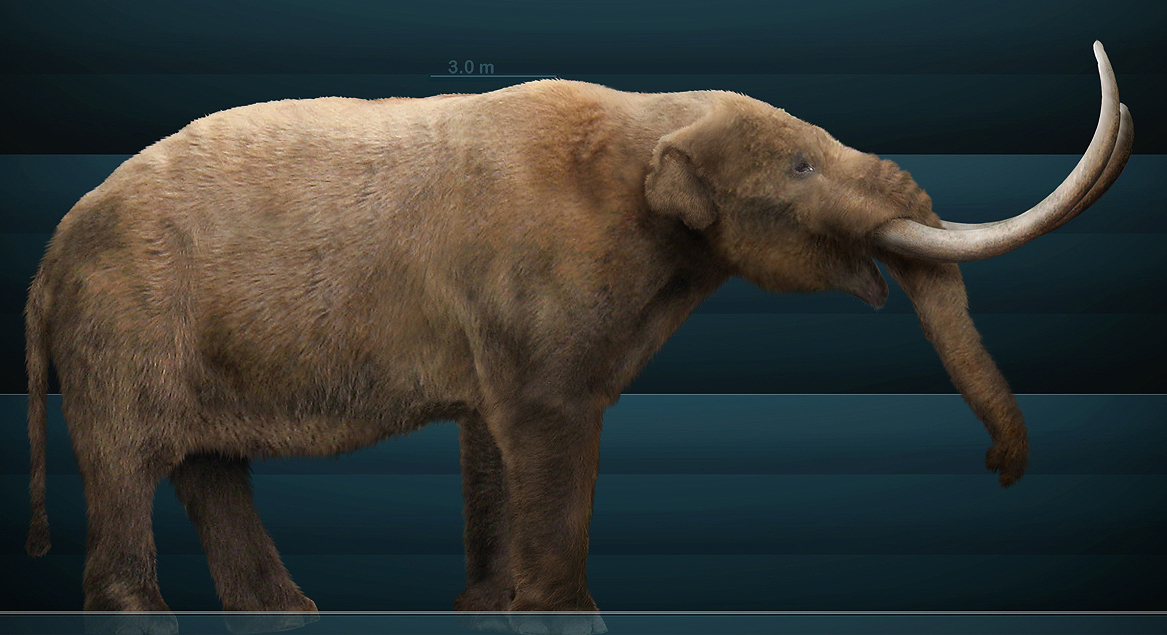
  - Restoration of a Mammut americanum, or American mastodon
    †Mammut americanum
- †Mammuthus
- Mercenaria
  - †Mercenaria campechiensis
  - †Mercenaria mercenaria
- Mesodesma
  - †Mesodesma arctatum
- Modiolus
  - †Modiolus hollicki
- †Monotherium
  - †Monotherium aberratum
- †Mya
  - †Mya arenaria
  - †Mya truncata
- Mytilus
  - †Mytilus edulis

=== N ===
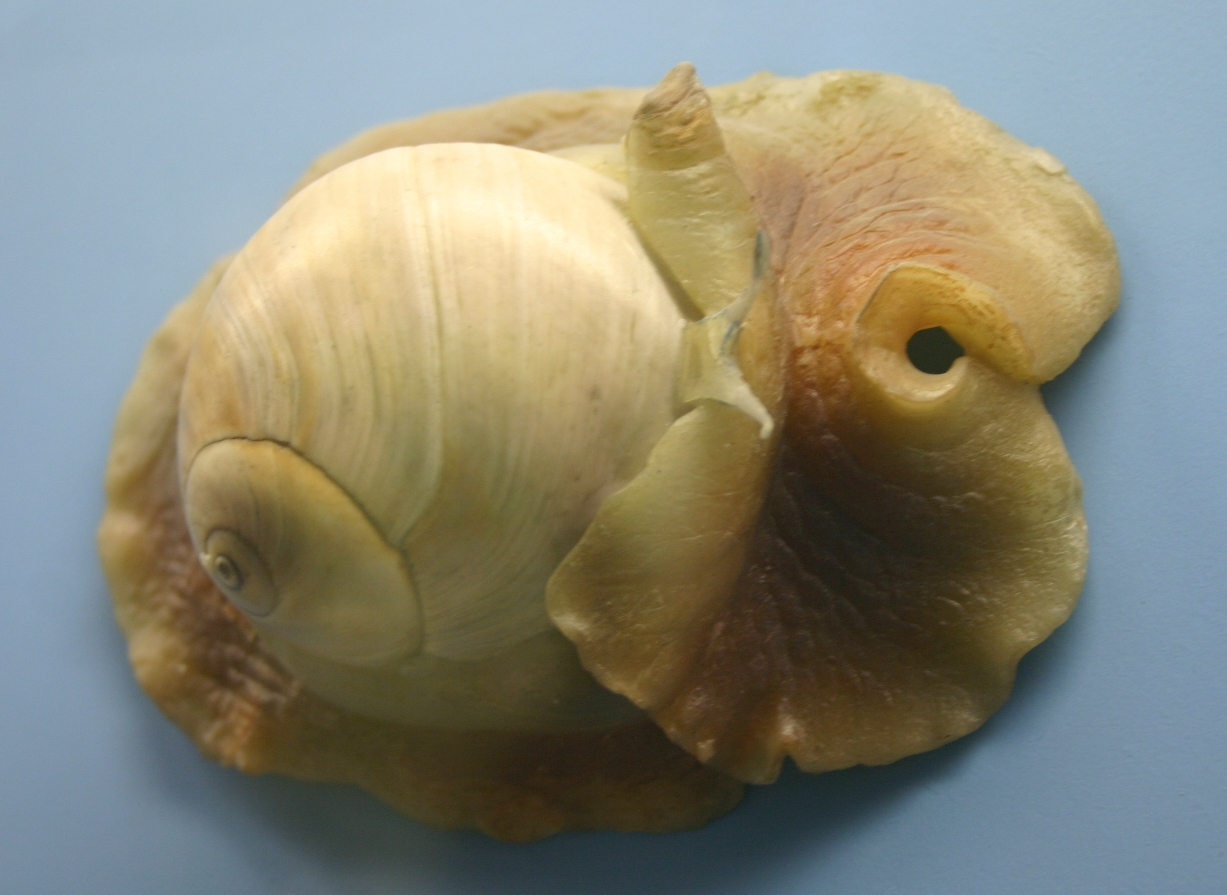
- Preserved Neverita moon sea snail
  Neverita
  - †Neverita duplicatus
- Nucula
  - †Nucula potomacensis – or unidentified related form

=== O ===
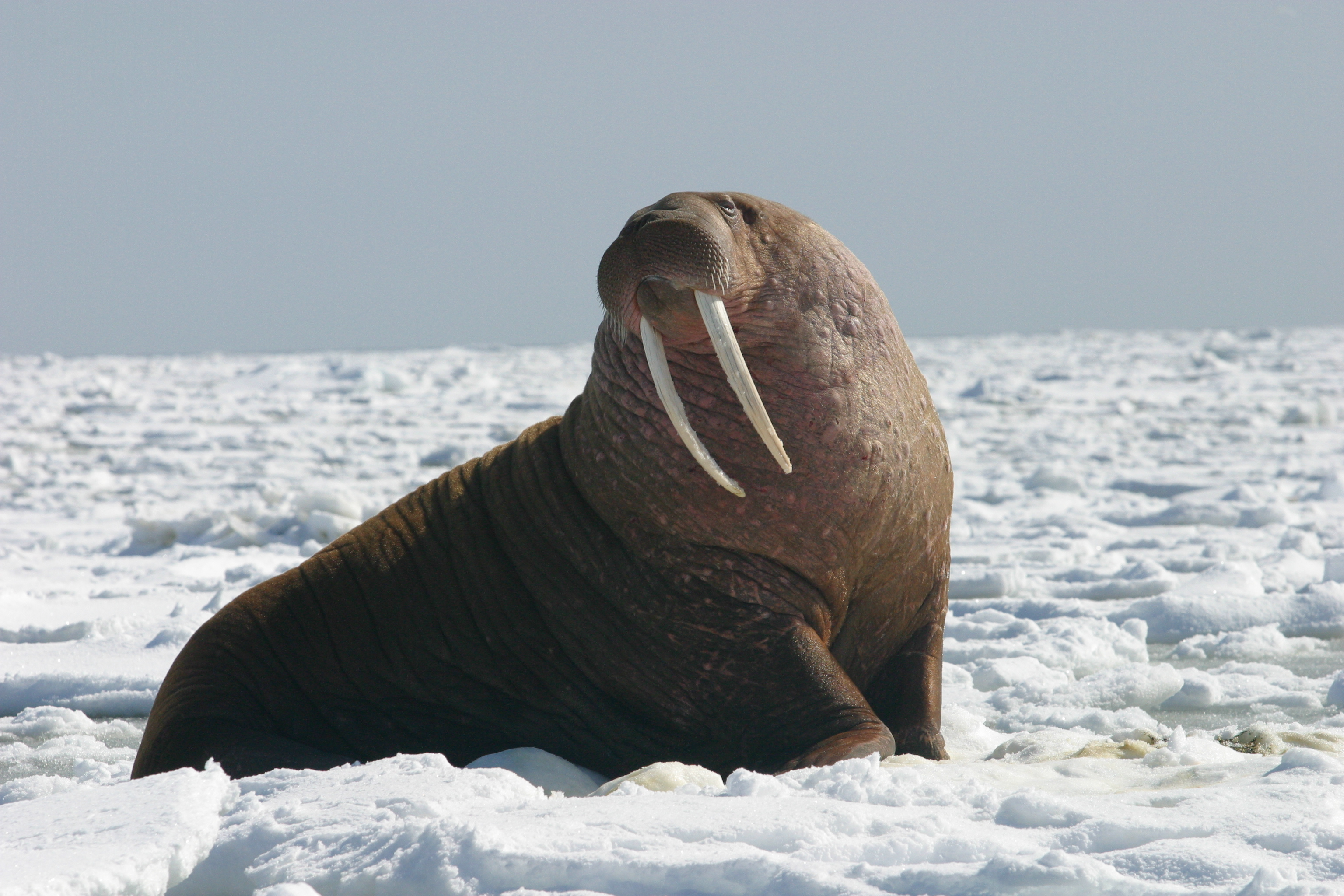
- A living Odobenus rosmarus, or walrus
  Odobenus
- Odostomia
  - †Odostomia crenulata
  - †Odostomia semicostata
- Ostrea

=== P ===
- Panomya
  - †Panomya norvegica
- Panopeus
  - †Panopeus herbstii
- Petricola
  - †Petricola pholadiformis
- †Pinguinus
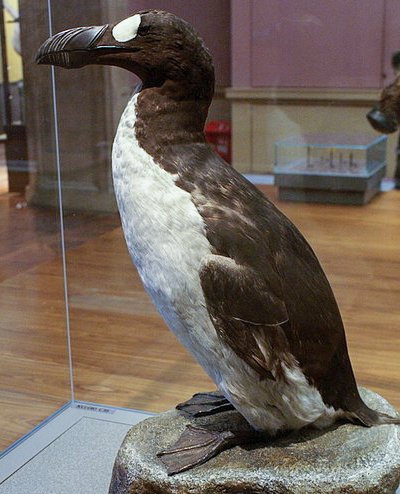
  - Taxidermied specimen of Pinguinus impennis, or the great auk
    †Pinguinus impennis
- Placopecten
  - †Placopecten magellanicus
- †Prophoca – or unidentified comparable form
  - †Prophoca rousseaui

=== S ===
- †Saxinis
  - †Saxinis regularis – type locality for species
- Serpula
  - †Serpula dianthus
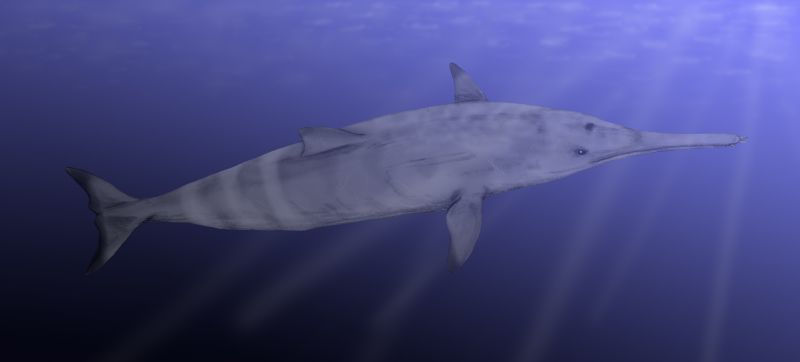
- Life restoration of the Oligocene-Miocene shark-toothed dolphin Squalodon
  †Squalodon
  - †Squalodon atlanticus

=== T ===
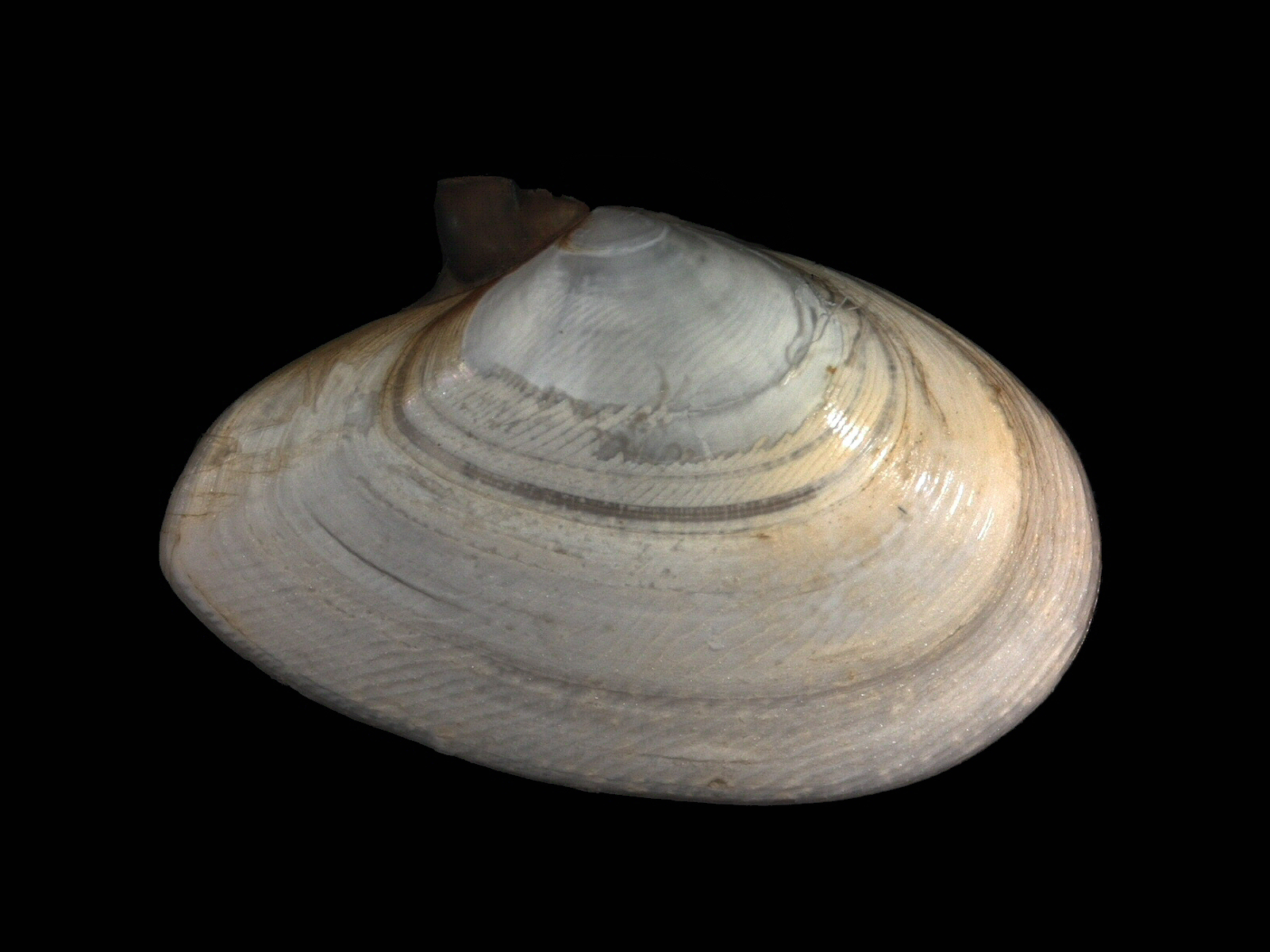
- Shell of a Tellina, or tellin
  Tellina
- Terebra
  - †Terebra juvenicostata
- Turbonilla
  - †Turbonilla interrupta
- Turritella

=== U ===
- Urosalpinx
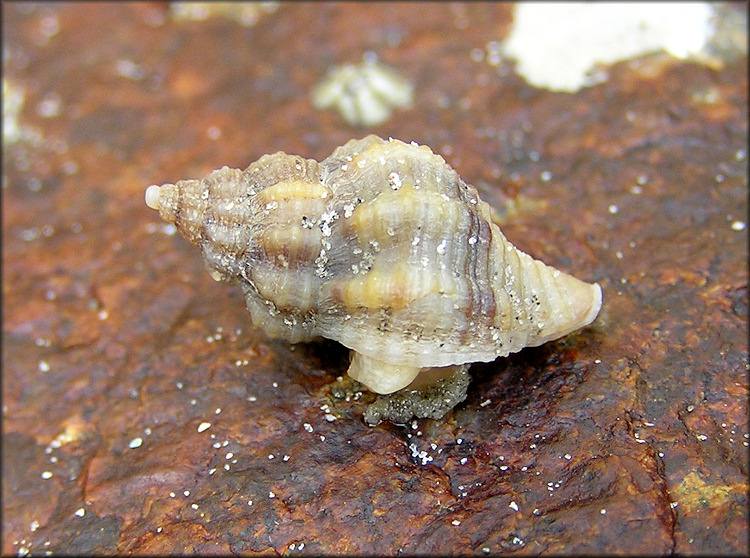
  - A living Urosalpinx sea snail, or oyster drill
    †Urosalpinx cinerea
