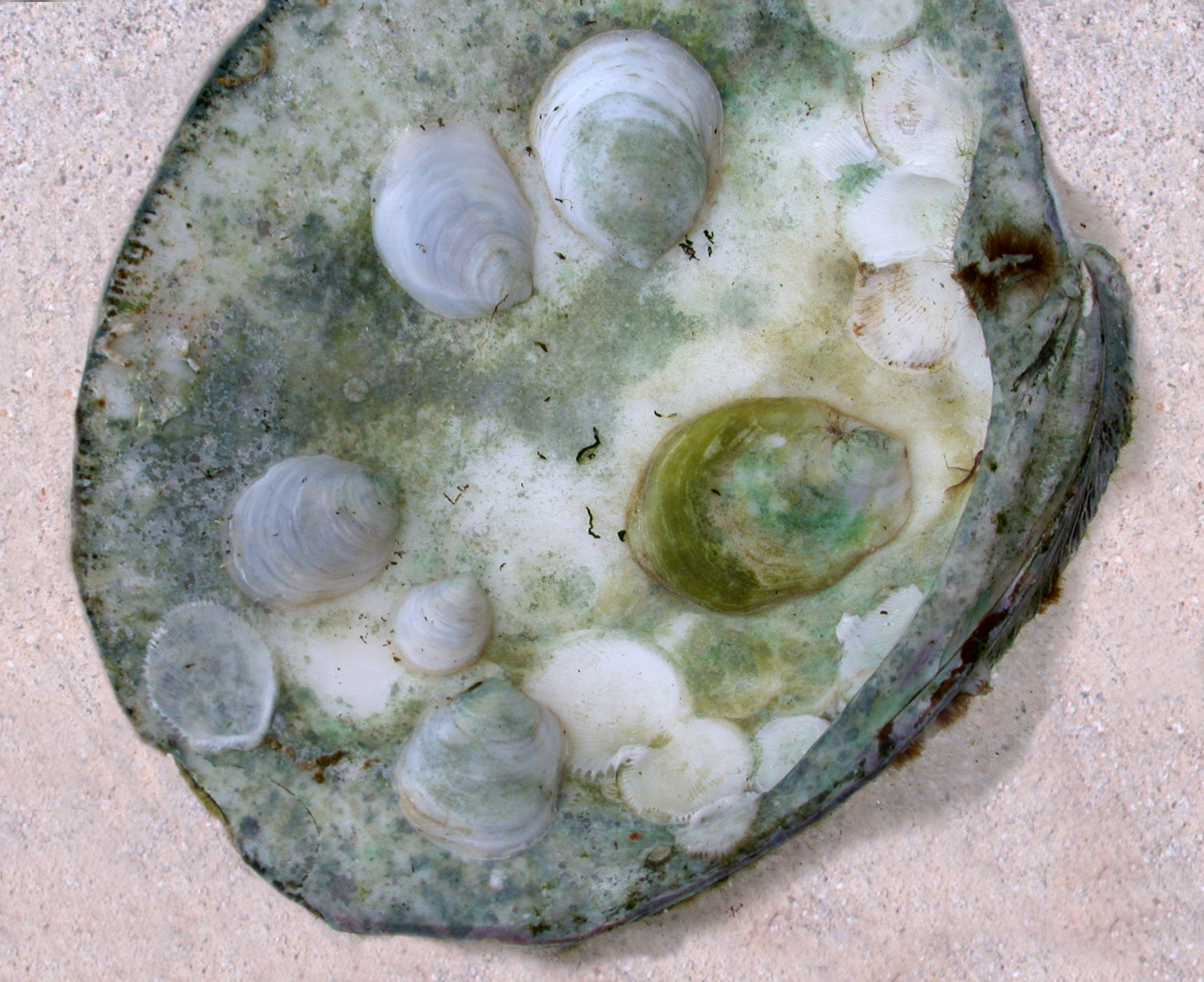

Scientific classification
- Kingdom: Animalia
- Phylum: Mollusca
- Class: Gastropoda
- Subclass: Caenogastropoda
- Order: Littorinimorpha
- Family: Calyptraeidae
- Genus: Crepidula
- Species: C. atrasolea

Binomial name
- Crepidula atrasolea Collin, 2000

= Crepidula atrasolea =

Species of gastropod

Crepidula atrasolea is a species of small sea snail, a slipper snail, a marine gastropod mollusk in the family Calyptraeidae, the slipper snails or slipper limpets, cup-and-saucer snails, and hat snails.

This species is similar to Crepidula plana and Crepidula depressa, but it can be distinguished from them on the basis of the dark pigment on the foot, and direct-developing embryos. DNA sequence data shows that these three species are closely related within the genus Crepidula, but are not closely related to other flat white species of Crepidula, which occur throughout the phylogeny of the genus.

A video showing the differences between the species is available CollinLab videos

== Distribution ==
This species occurs in the Western Atlantic Ocean. This species occurs in Florida, South Carolina, North Carolina. Flat white Crepidula occurring north of this range are almost certainly Crepidula plana. Old records often confuse Crepidula plana, Crepidula atrasolea and Crepidula depressa, and distribution data should be treated with caution, unless it includes observations of development type, body color, or genetic data.

== Description ==
The maximum recorded shell length is 15.8 mm. The maximum shell size of this species occurs in females; males are much smaller.

== Habitat ==
The minimum recorded depth for this species is 0 m; maximum recorded depth is 20 m. Crepidula atrasolea is particularly common living on dead oyster shells in shall reefs and seagrass beds in Florida.
