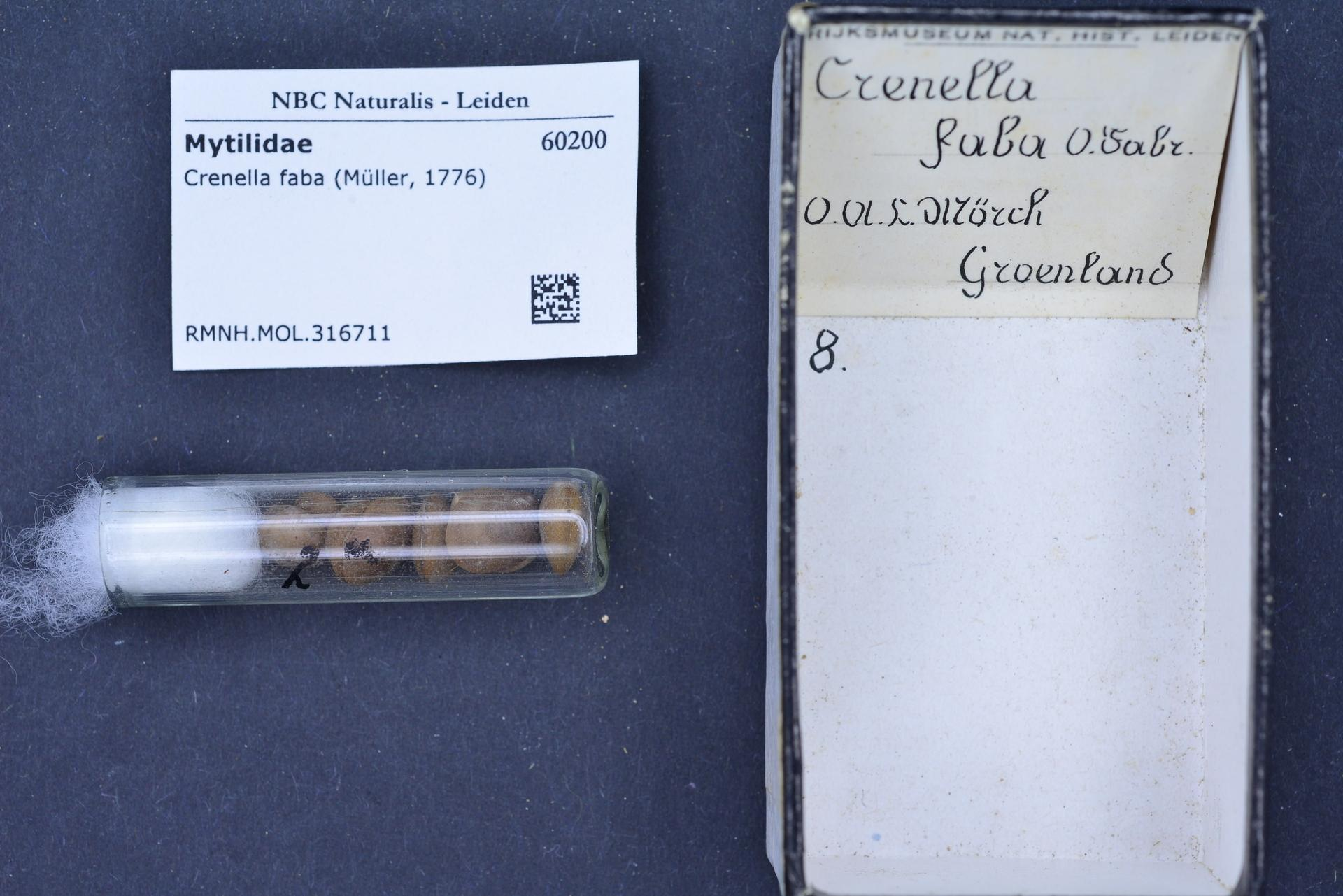
- Crenella faba

Scientific classification
- Domain: Eukaryota
- Kingdom: Animalia
- Phylum: Mollusca
- Class: Bivalvia
- Order: Mytilida
- Family: Mytilidae
- Genus: Crenella; Brown, 1827

= Crenella (bivalve) =

Genus of bivalves

Crenella is a genus of bean mussels in the family Mytilidae.

== Species ==
Species in the genus Crenella include:

- Crenella abbotti Altena, 1968
- Crenella adamsiana
- Crenella arenaria Martin Monterosato, 1875
- Crenella canariensis (Odhner, 1932)
- Crenella caudiva Olsson, 1961
- Crenella decussata (Montagu, 1808)
- Crenella divaricata (Orbigny in Sagra, 1853)
- Crenella ehrenbergi
- Crenella faba (O. F. Müller, 1776) - little bean mussel
- Crenella gemma Olsson & McGinty, 1958
- Crenella glandula (Totten, 1834) - glandular bean mussel
- Crenella magellanica Linse, 2002
- Crenella marionensis E. A. Smith, 1885
- Crenella minuta Thiele & Jaeckel, 1931
- Crenella pectinula (Gould, 1841)
- Crenella pellucida (Jeffreys, 1859)
- Crenella pura E. A. Smith, 1890
- Crenella skomma (McLean & Schwengel, 1944)

Fossil species

- †Crenella anterodivaricata Eames, 1951
- †Crenella cucullata Deshayes, 1861
- †Crenella cymbiola Vincent, 1930
- †Crenella depontaillieri Cossmann & Lambert, 1884
- †Crenella elegans Deshayes, 1861
- †Crenella humilis Vincent, 1930
- †Crenella scrobiculata von Koenen, 1883
- †Crenella striatina Deshayes, 1861
- †Crenella striatocostata Nagao, 1928
