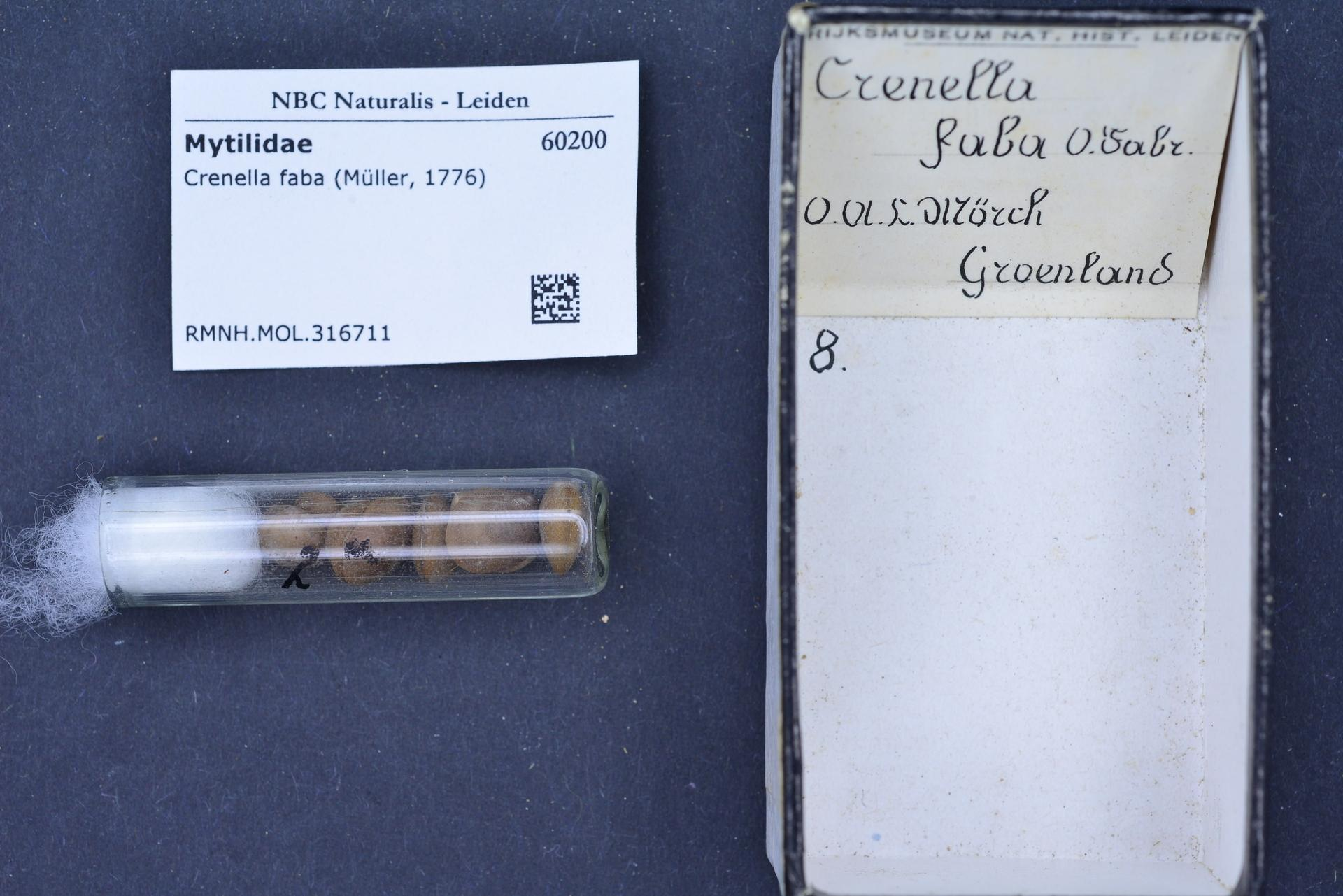

Scientific classification
- Kingdom: Animalia
- Phylum: Mollusca
- Class: Bivalvia
- Order: Mytilida
- Family: Mytilidae
- Genus: Crenella
- Species: C. faba

Binomial name
- Crenella faba (O. F. Müller, 1776)

Synonyms
- Arvella faba (O. F. Müller, 1776); Mytilus faba O. F. Müller, 1776

= Crenella faba =

Species of bivalve

Crenella faba, or the Little bean mussel, is a species of bivalve mollusc in the family Mytilidae. It can be found along the north Atlantic coast of North America, ranging from Greenland to Nova Scotia.
