= Argoides =

Argoides Temporal range: Late Triassic-Early Jurassic, 221.5–196.5 Ma

Trace fossil classification
- Domain: Eukaryota
- Kingdom: Animalia
- Phylum: Chordata
- Clade: Dinosauria
- Ichnogenus: †Argoides; Hitchcock, 1845

Type ichnospecies
- †Argoides minimus Hitchcock, 1836

Other ichnospecies
- †Argoides macrodactylus Hitchcock, 1841; †Argoides redfieldii Hitchcock, 1844; †Argoides robustus Hitchcock, 1837

Synonyms
- Argozoum Hitchcock, 1848; Ornithichnites? Hitchcock, 1836

Dinosaur footprint

Argoides is an ichnogenus of dinosaur footprint, originally named as an ichnospecies of Ornithichnites, left by what was possibly an ornithopod, although due to the age of the tracks (some of which predate the oldest known ornithopod fossils), they were probably instead made by theropods. A 2.8 cm long footprint from the lower Jurassic represents the holotype. The size of the track maker is estimated at 56 cm (1.84 ft) long and 185 grams (0.408 lbs) in weight. It has been found in the Portland, Passaic and Turners Falls Formations of Massachusetts, Connecticut and New Jersey.

== See also ==
- List of dinosaur ichnogenera
