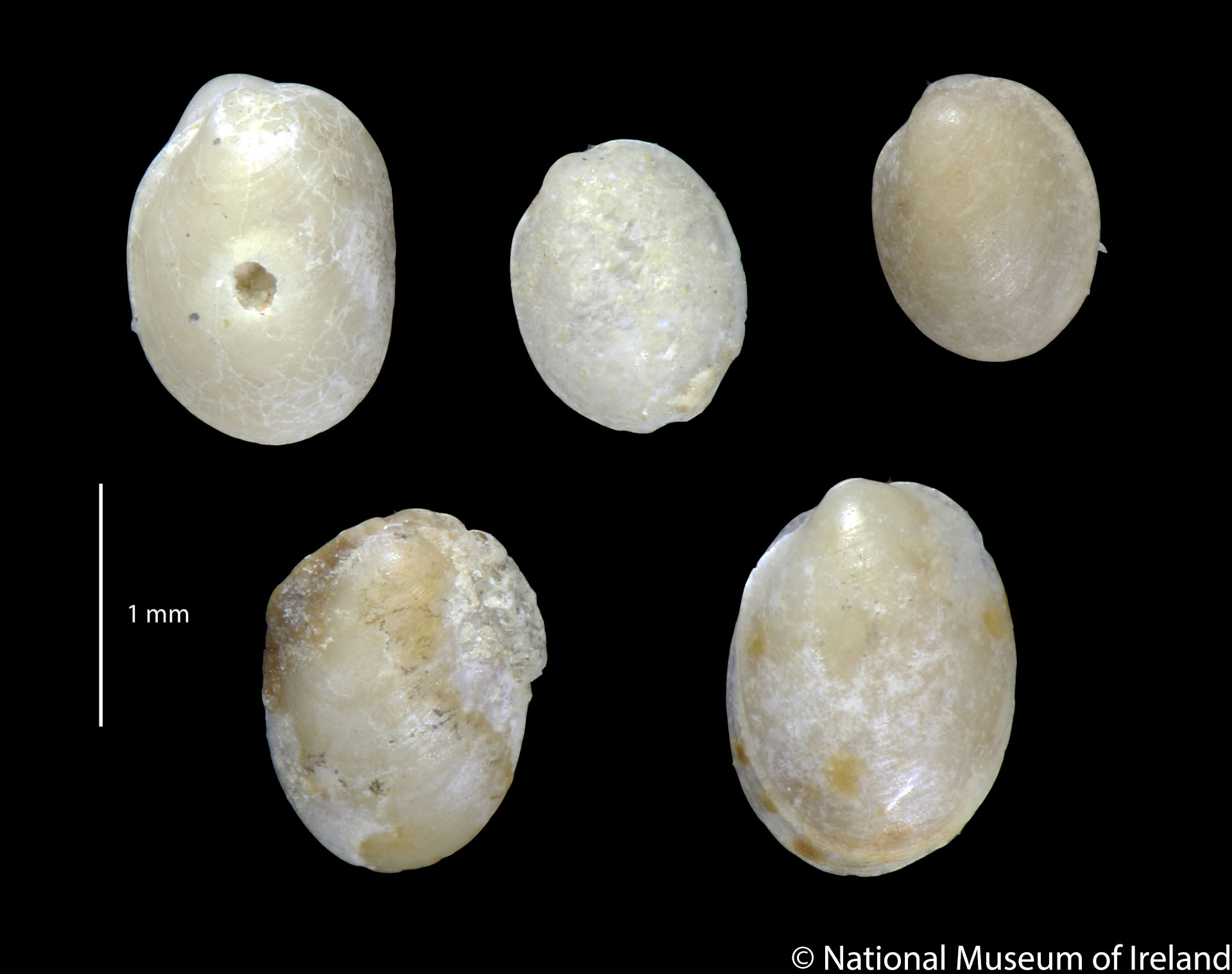

Scientific classification
- Domain: Eukaryota
- Kingdom: Animalia
- Phylum: Mollusca
- Class: Bivalvia
- Order: Mytilida
- Family: Mytilidae
- Genus: Crenella
- Species: C. arenaria

Binomial name
- Crenella arenaria Monterosato, 1875

= Crenella arenaria =

Species of mollusc

Crenella arenaria is a mussel in the genus Crenella. It is native to Azores, Alboran Sea, Adriatic Sea, Aegean Sea, Tyrrhenian Sea, and the Strait of Sicily.

== Appearance ==
They are bright white to whitish-yellow.
