= Sunnagyn Range =

Mountain range in Russia

- Алдан-Учур
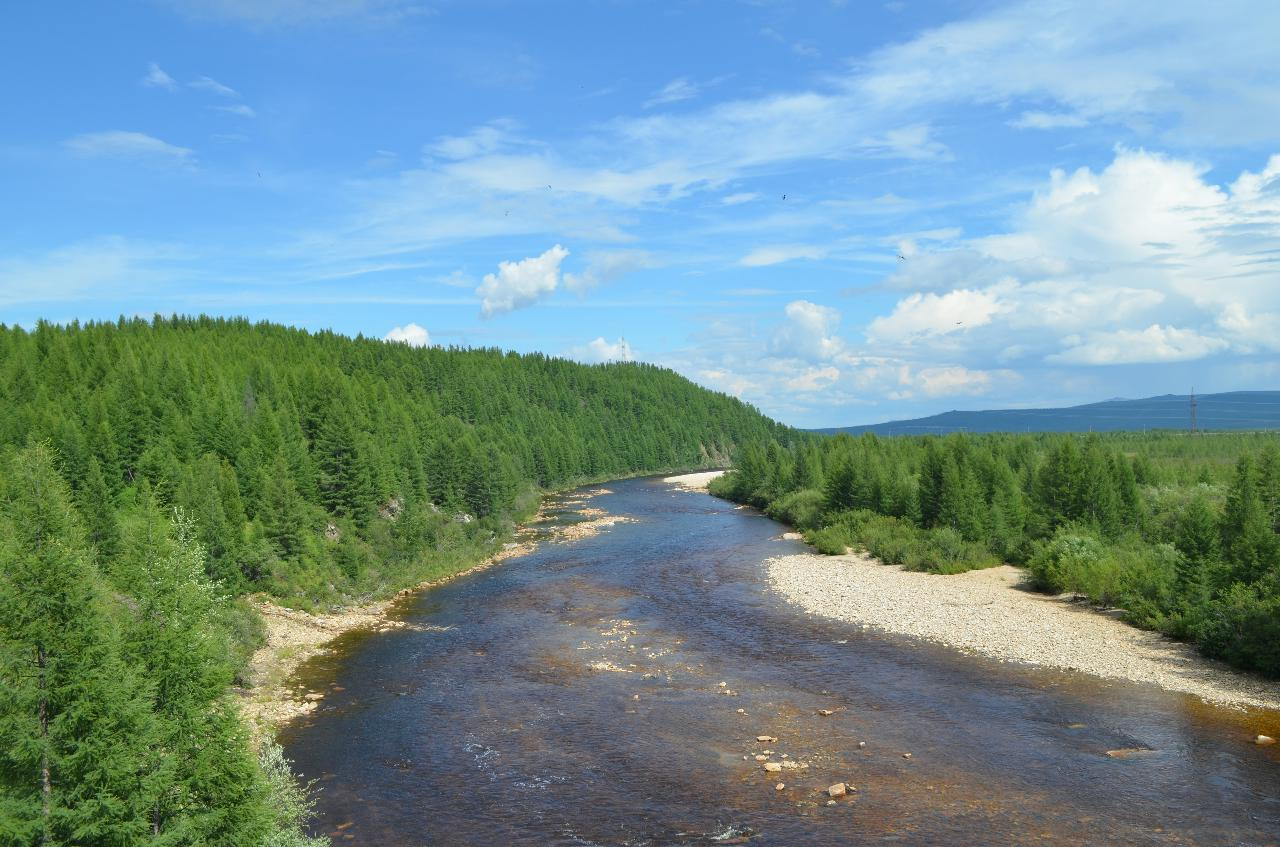
- River Timpton marks the western limit of the range.

Highest point
- Peak: Unnamed
- Elevation: 2,246 m (7,369 ft)
- Coordinates: 57°57′18″N 129°15′58″E

Dimensions
- Length: 250 km (160 mi) NE / SW
- Width: 160 km (99 mi) NW / SE

Geography
- Location within Sakha Republic
- Location: Yakutia, Far Eastern Federal District
- Range coordinates: 58°0′N 128°20′E
- Parent range: Aldan Highlands, South Siberian System

Geology
- Rock age: Precambrian
- Rock type(s): Crystalline schist, gneiss and granite

The Sunnagyn Range (Russian: Суннагын), also known as Aldan-Uchur (Russian: Алда́но-Учу́рский хребе́т; Yakut: Алдан-Учур, romanized: Aldan-Uçur), is a range of mountains in North-eastern Russia. Administratively the range is part of the Sakha Republic, Russian Federation.

== Geography ==
The Sunnagyn is the highest subrange of the Aldan Highlands of the South Siberian System. It rises at the northeastern edge of the highlands, south of the right bank of the Aldan River, between the valley of its tributary Timpton to the west, and the Uchur to the east. The Gynym, a tributary of the Uchur, marks the southern border of the range.

The mountaintops of the range are dome-shaped or flattened and the highest point of the Sunnagyn is an unnamed 2,246 metres (7,369 ft) high summit located in the central zone.

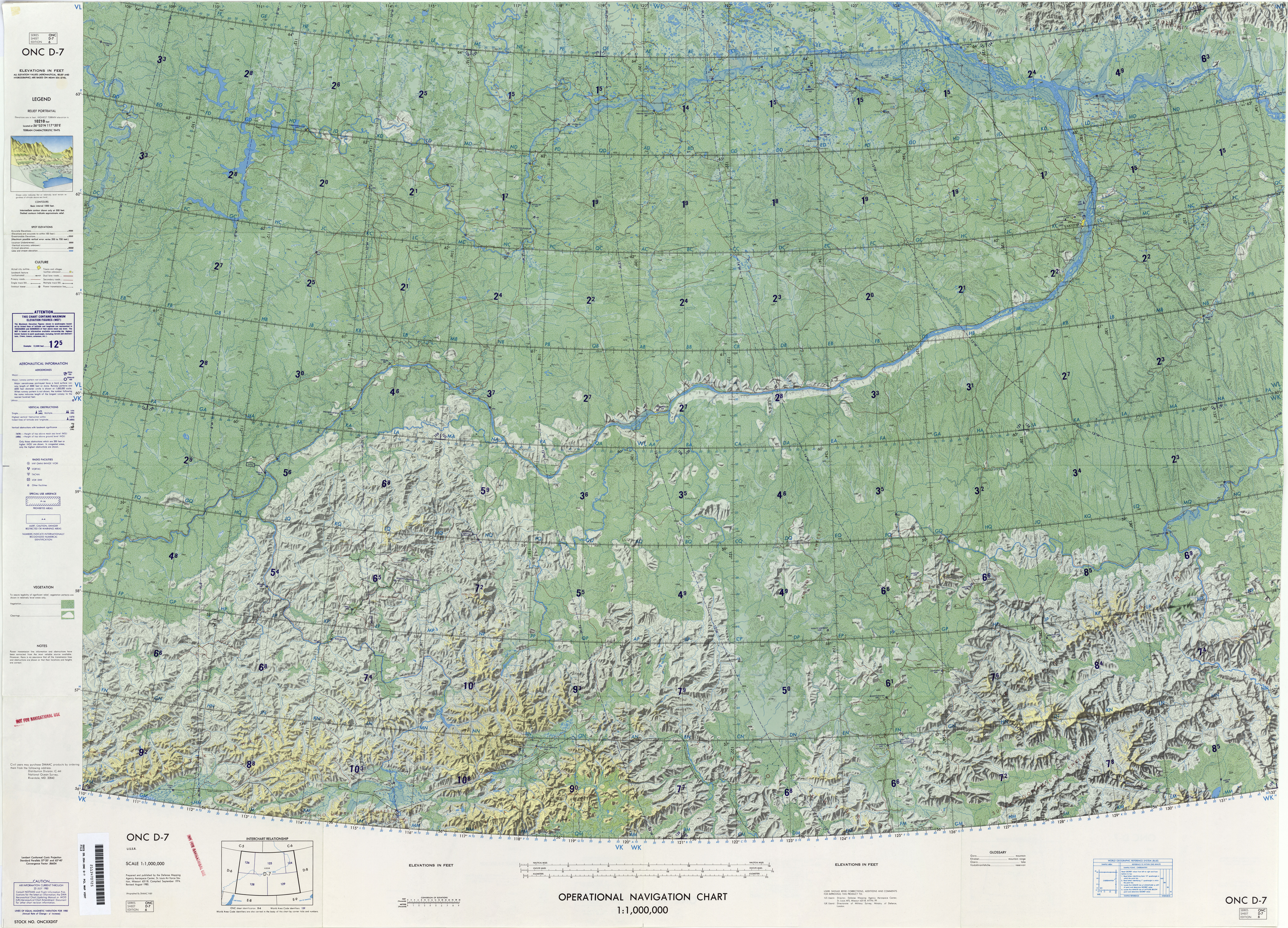
Defense Mapping Agency topographical map showing the Sunnagyn Range in the lower right.

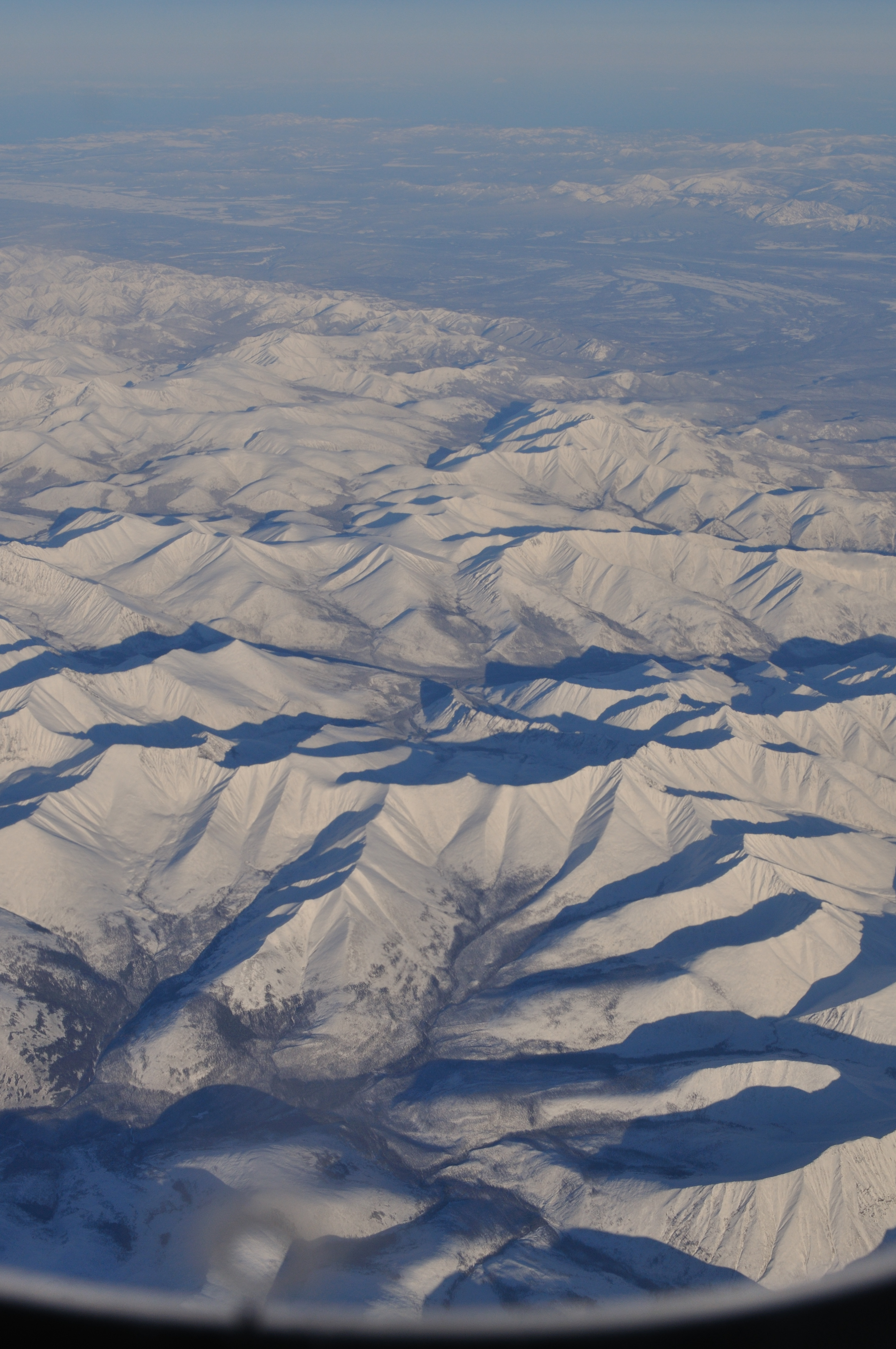
Sunnagyn Range from the air.

== Flora ==
The mountain slopes and the river valleys of the Sunnagyn Range are covered with larch forests. Thickets of dwarf cedar grow at higher altitudes and mountain tundra above the treeline.

== See also ==
- List of mountains and hills of Russia
- Sunnaginia
