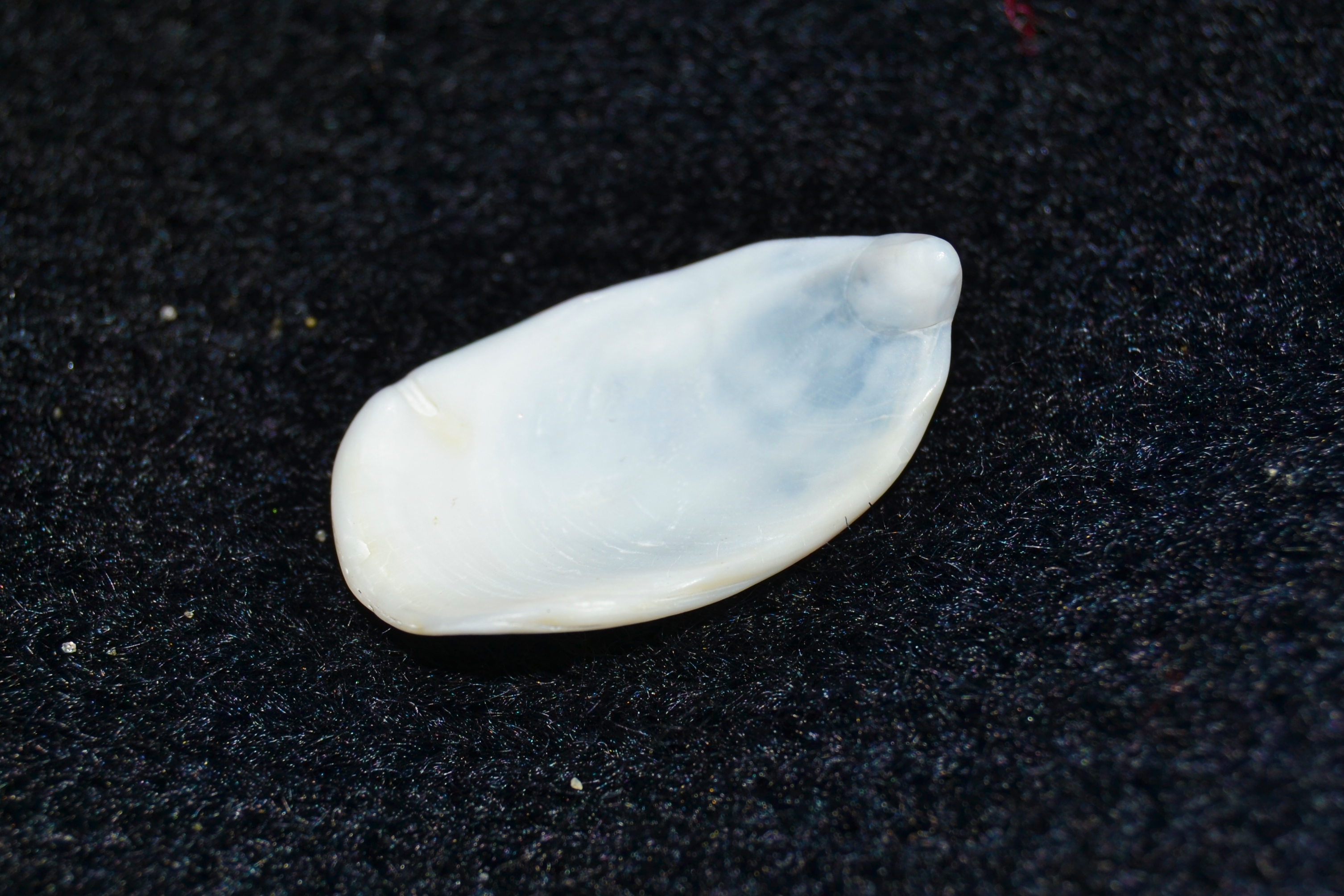

Scientific classification
- Kingdom: Animalia
- Phylum: Mollusca
- Class: Gastropoda
- Subclass: Caenogastropoda
- Order: Littorinimorpha
- Family: Calyptraeidae
- Genus: Crepidula
- Species: C. plana

Binomial name
- Crepidula plana Say, 1822

= Crepidula plana =

Species of gastropod

Crepidula plana, common names the eastern white slippersnail and the flat slipper shell, is a species of sea snail, a marine gastropod mollusk in the family Calyptraeidae, the slipper snails or slipper limpets, cup-and-saucer snails, and hat snails. This species is characterized by a flat white shell, a white body, and development that includes a planktotrophic larval stage. This species often occurs inside large gastropod shells that are inhabited by hermit crabs. In this case the shells are often extremely flat, and often recurved.

Like all slipper snails, Crepidula plana is a filter feeder. They brood their offspring in clusters of transparent capsules between the substrate, the propodium and the neck.

Crepidula plana is native to the East Coast of North America, where it ranges from Canada to North Carolina. It has also been reported as introduced into San Francisco Bay. Reports of this species in the Gulf of Mexico or south of North Carolina are incorrect, and result from taxonomic confusion with other flat white species of Crepidula, including Crepidula atrasolea, and Crepidula depressa.

== Distribution ==
In the past, Crepidula plana has been reported to range from 48°N to 38°S; 97.75°W to 34.9°W. Much of this distribution information is incorrect, because it has not been updated to reflect the current taxonomic understanding of this group of similar species.

The distribution has been reported to include:

- Canada: Nova Scotia, New Brunswick
- USA: Massachusetts, New York, New Jersey, Maryland, Virginia, North Carolina, South Carolina, Georgia, East Florida, West Florida, Louisiana, Flower Garden Banks (East & West), Texas
- Mexico: Tamaulipas, Tabasco, Veracruz, Campeche State, Cayo Arcas, Campeche, Yucatán State, Campeche Bank, Alacran Reef, Quintana Roo
- Costa Rica
- Panama
- Colombia
- Venezuela: Gulf of Venezuela, Sucre, Isla Margarita
- Bermuda
- Jamaica
- Virgin Islands: St. Croix
- St. Vincent & the Grenadines: Grenada
- Surinam
- Brazil: Amapa, Ceara, Pernambuco, Rio de Janeiro, São Paulo

However, since the 1980s, DNA sequence data, allozyme data and developmental data have provided evidence that the flat white Crepidula from Eastern North America is composed of at least three distinct species. C. plana actually ranges only from Nova Scotia and New Brunswick south to Georgia or northern Florida. Records of C. plana in Southern Florida and the Gulf of Mexico are almost certainly misidentified C. atrasolea or C. depressa. The identity of the flat white Crepidula species which occurs south of the Gulf of Mexico (in the Caribbean) needs to be re-examined, as it is certainly not C. plana.

== Description ==
The shell is flat and white, the internal septum is flat, and there are no muscle scars inside the shell. The length of the shell is 15 to 35 mm. The maximum recorded shell length is 43 mm.

Crepidula plana produces planktotrophic larvae.

== Habitat ==
The minimum recorded depth for this species is 0 m; the maximum recorded depth is 110 m.
