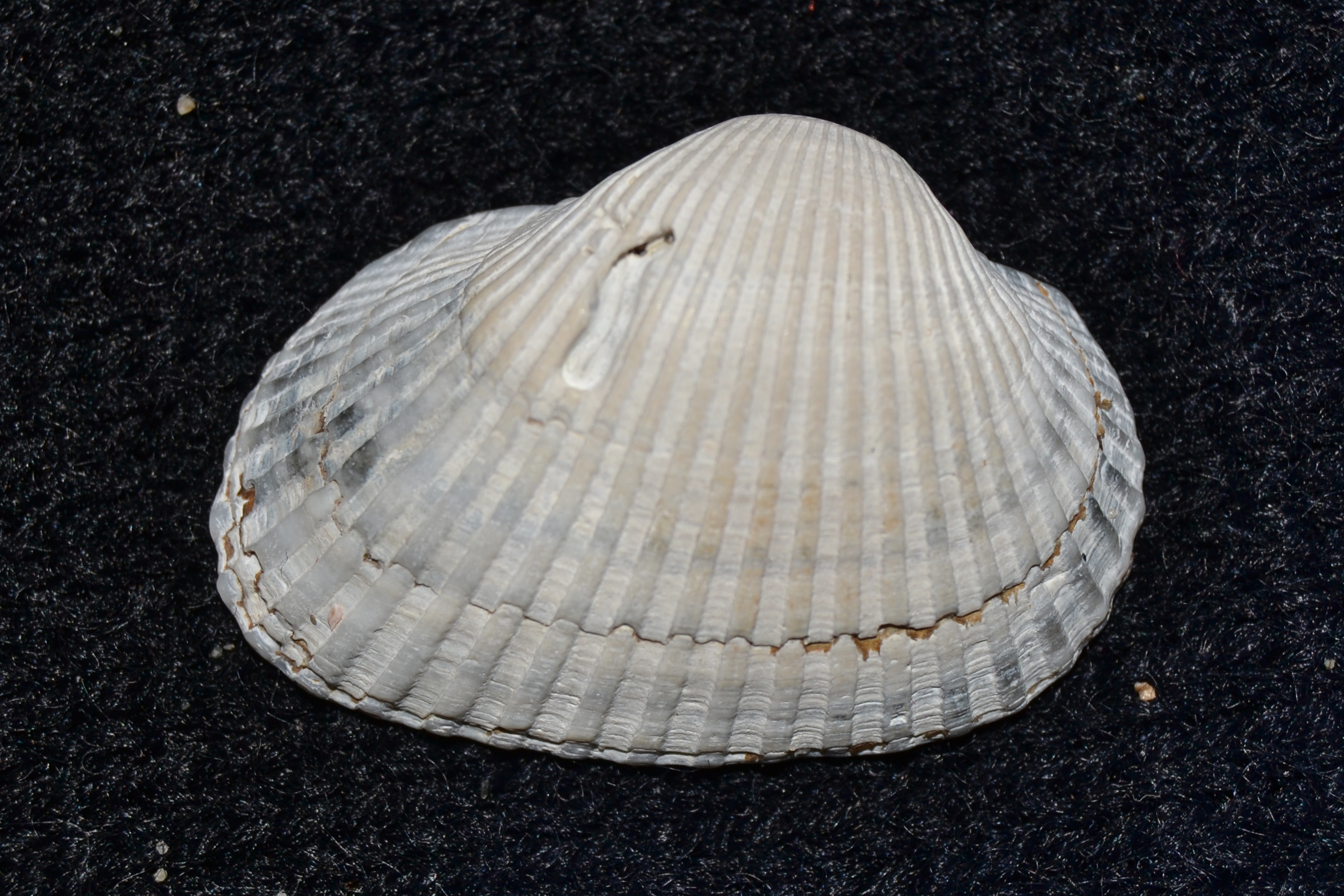

Scientific classification
- Kingdom: Animalia
- Phylum: Mollusca
- Class: Bivalvia
- Order: Arcida
- Family: Arcidae
- Genus: Anadara
- Species: A. transversa

Binomial name
- Anadara transversa (Say, 1822)

= Anadara transversa =

Species of bivalve

Anadara transversa, or the Transverse ark clam, is a clam in the family Arcidae. It can be found along the Atlantic coast of North America, ranging from Massachusetts to Texas, including the West Indies.

It is an invasive species in the eastern Mediterranean Sea. First found in Turkey in 1977, then Greece in 1993, and then the coast of Italy near Venice in 2000.

Right and left valve of the same specimen:

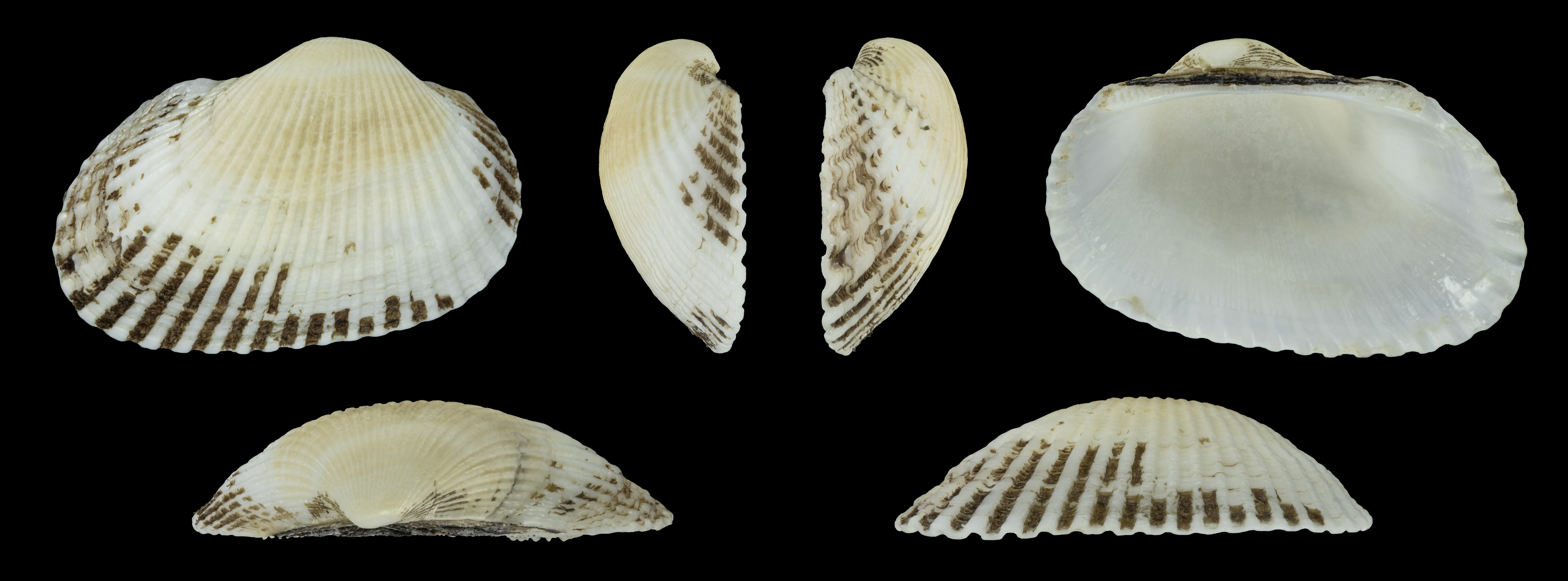
Right valve

Left valve
