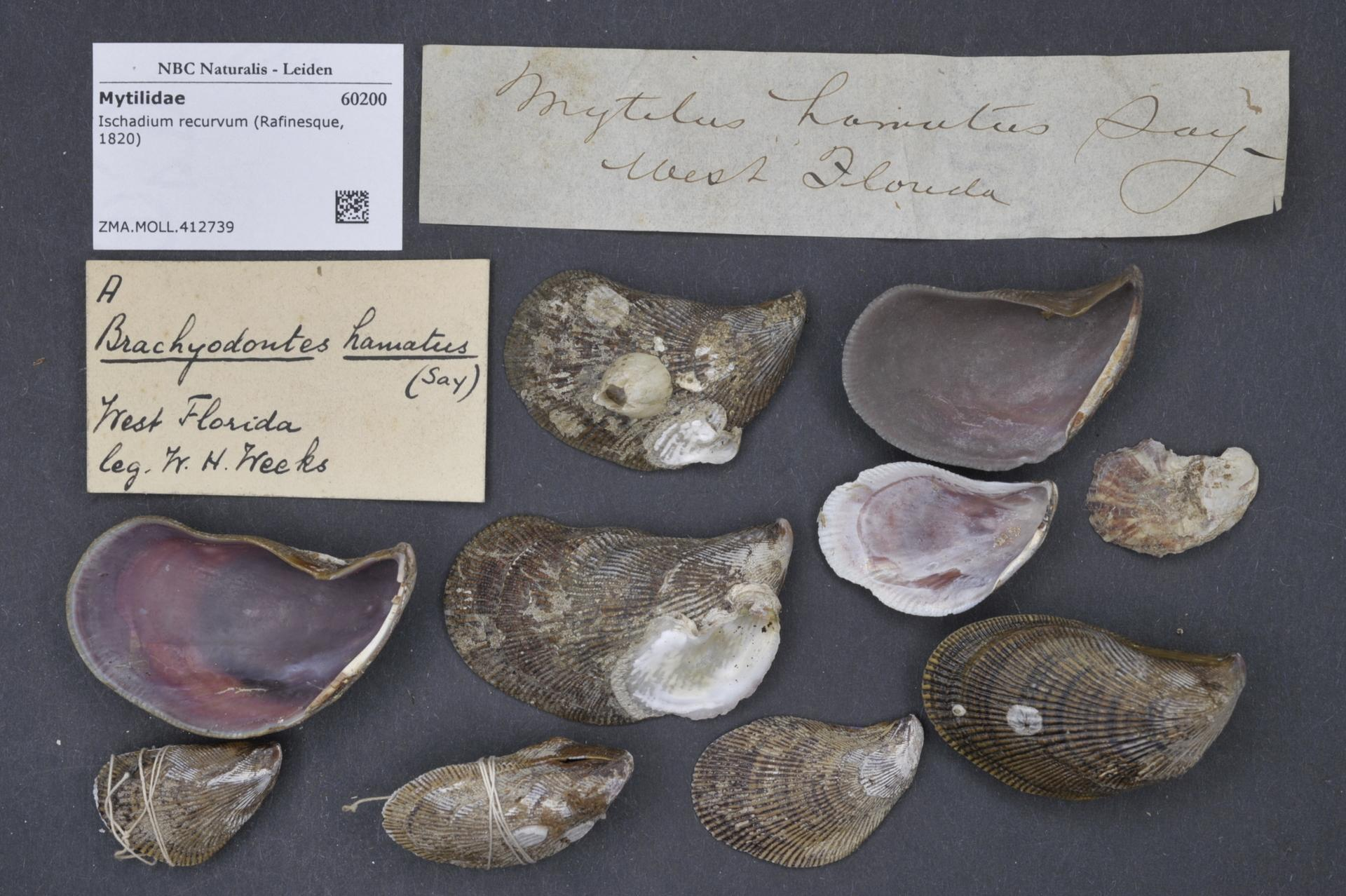

Conservation status
- Secure (NatureServe)

Scientific classification
- Kingdom: Animalia
- Phylum: Mollusca
- Class: Bivalvia
- Order: Mytilida
- Family: Mytilidae
- Genus: Ischadium; Jukes-Browne, 1905
- Species: I. recurvum

Binomial name
- Ischadium recurvum (Rafinesque, 1820)

= Ischadium =

Genus of bivalves

Ischadium is a monotypic genus of mussels in the family Mytilidae. The sole species is Ischadium recurvum, known as the hooked mussel or bent mussel. It can be found along the Atlantic coast of North America, ranging from Cape Cod to the West Indies. They are often found growing on eastern oysters, either intertidally (south of the Chesapeake Bay, where exposed oysters can survive the winter) or subtidally. They also attach to other hard substrates, including artificial reefs and dead shells of the brackish water clam Rangia cuneata.

Right and left valves of the same specimen:

Right valve

Left valve

== Predation ==
Ischadium detects predators primarily through scent—either that of the predator itself or of nearby dead bivalves. The primary predators of hooked mussels include the blue crab (Callinectes sapidus). Ischadium recurvum typically grows on eastern oyster (Crassostrea virginica) reefs, which are commonly found in estuarine conditions in the Gulf of Mexico.Ischadium is a favored prey item due to its macronutrient richness. Compared to other mussels, such as Mulinia lateralis, it contains larger amounts of crude proteins, lipids, ash, and gross energy regardless of the season. It also contains more magnesium, iron, zinc, copper, and manganese than other comparable mussels. The nutritional value of these mussels makes them valuable to predators.

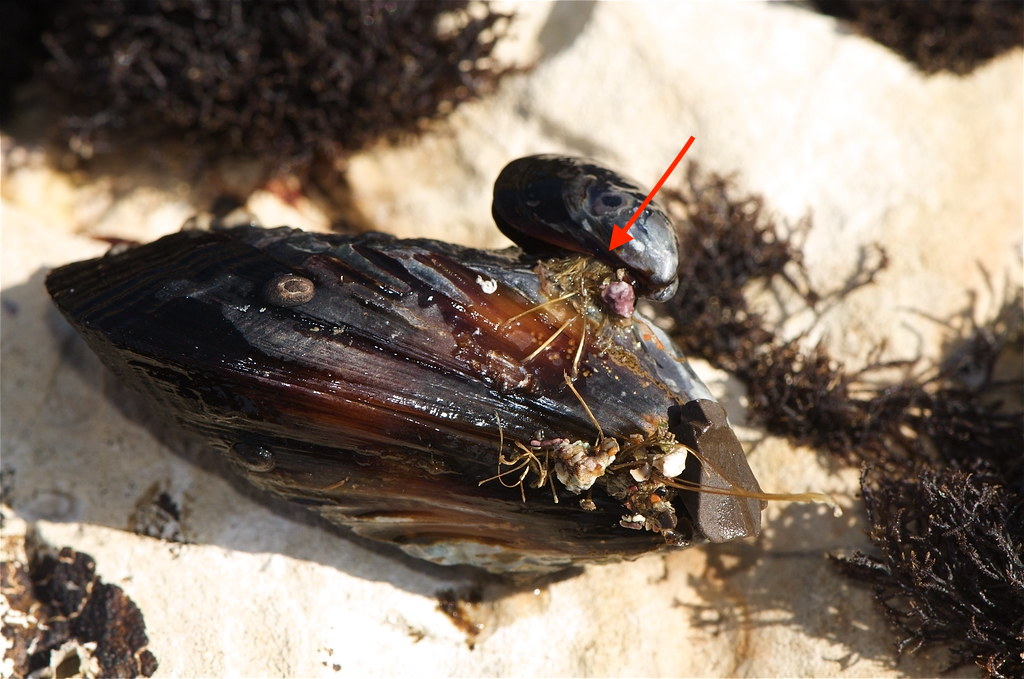
Byssal Threads Growing from a Mussel

=== Strategies to avoid Predation ===
To protect itself, Ischadium builds its defenses by creating a harder shell. Shell strength—the amount of force required to crack the shell—increases with the mussel's length. These mussels tend to survive better in clumps rather than as individuals due to the increased difficulty for predators to obtain them. In clumps, the mussels are not only harder to reach but also harder to detach. Mussels also defend themselves by producing byssal threads, which anchor them to their substrate. Creating more threads makes a mussel harder to remove. Because larger mussels produce a greater number of byssal threads, smaller mussels tend to be targeted by predators like the blue crab. Although smaller mussels expend a greater fraction of their energy to produce these threads, their smaller size and surface area leave them vulnerable.

== Habitat ==
Ischadium recurvum prefers to feed in environments with lower salinity. As salinity increases, the mussel's rates of clearance, filtration, organic ingestion, and absorption decrease. High salinity levels are stressful for this species and make its feeding inefficient. Because I. recurvum is dependent on oyster beds, its survival is directly linked to that of the oysters. In regions such as the Chesapeake Bay, where disease and over-harvesting have caused a decline in the oyster population, there has been a corresponding loss in the hooked mussel population. Although Ischadium can attach to other hard substrates, the decline in oyster populations leads to increased sedimentation rates, which bury available substrates. This makes the Ischadium population extremely susceptible to changes in the oyster population.
