= Sunnaginia =

Sunnaginia Temporal range: Lower Cambrian

Scientific classification
- Kingdom: Animalia
- Order: Tommotiida
- Genus: †Sunnaginia; Missarzhevsky, 1969

Extinct genus of brachiopods

Sunnaginia is a tommotiid known from the Comley Limestone and elsewhere, and appears to represent one of the closest relatives to the brachiopod crown group, in a more derived position than Eccentrotheca.

== See also ==
- Sunnagyn
