= Rhomboidella canariensis =

Scientific classification
- Kingdom: Animalia
- Phylum: Mollusca
- Class: Bivalvia
- Order: Mytilida
- Family: Mytilidae
- Genus: Rhomboidella
- Species: R. canariensis

Binomial name
- Rhomboidella canariensis (Odhner, 1932)

Synonyms
- Crenella canariensis Odhner, 1932

Species of bivalve

Rhomboidella canariensis is a species of mussel in the family Mytilidae that is native to Madeira and the Canary Islands.
