= Steropoides =

Trace fossil classification
- Domain: Eukaryota
- Kingdom: Animalia
- Phylum: Chordata
- Class: Mammalia
- Ichnogenus: †Steropoides; Hitchcock, 1845

Trace fossil

Steropoides is an ichnogenus of Prehistoric mammal footprint.
