= Crenella glandula =

Scientific classification
- Kingdom: Animalia
- Phylum: Mollusca
- Class: Bivalvia
- Order: Mytilida
- Family: Mytilidae
- Genus: Crenella
- Species: C. glandula

Binomial name
- Crenella glandula (Totten, 1834)

Species of bivalve

Crenella glandula, or the Glandular bean mussel, is a species of bivalve mollusc in the family Mytilidae. It can be found along the Atlantic coast of North America, ranging from Labrador to North Carolina.
