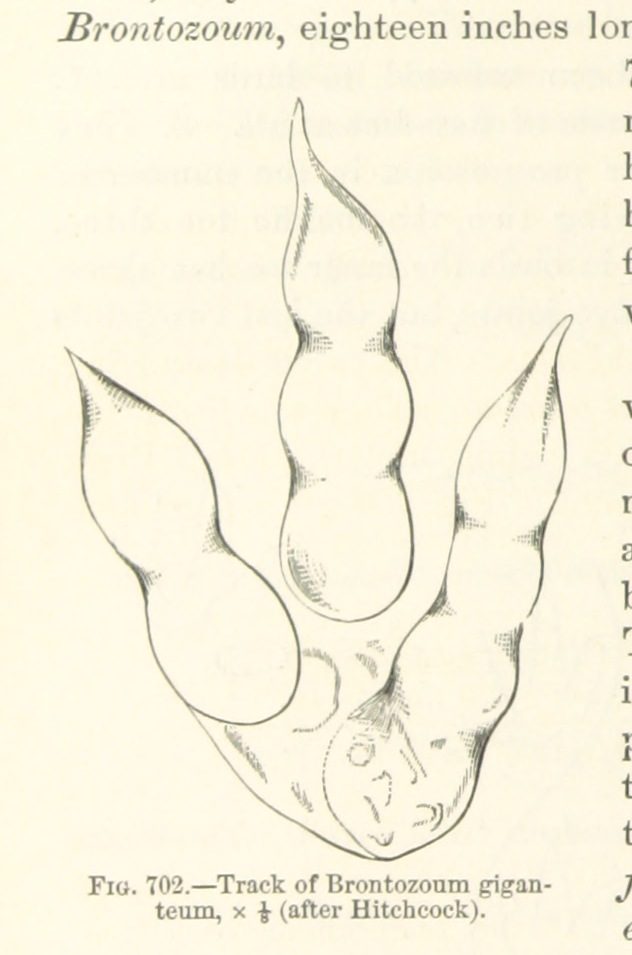
- Track of Brontozoum giganteum, × ⅛ (after Hitchcock)

Trace fossil classification
- Domain: Eukaryota
- Kingdom: Animalia
- Phylum: Chordata
- Clade: Dinosauria
- Clade: Saurischia
- Clade: Theropoda
- Ichnogenus: †Brontozoum; E. Hitchcock, 1847

= Brontozoum =

Dinosaur footprint

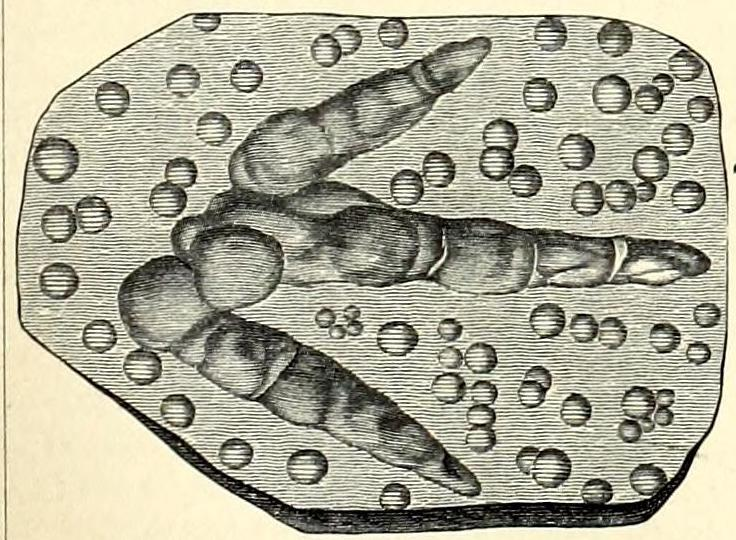
Another illustration of a Brontozoum giganteum footprint

Brontozoum is an ichnogenus of dinosaur footprint.

== See also ==
- List of dinosaur ichnogenera
