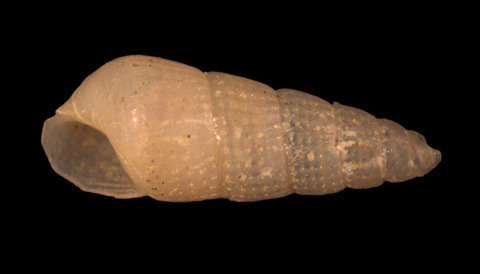

Scientific classification
- Kingdom: Animalia
- Phylum: Mollusca
- Class: Gastropoda
- Family: Pyramidellidae
- Genus: Turbonilla
- Species: T. interrupta

Binomial name
- Turbonilla interrupta (Totten, 1835)

Synonyms
- Chemnitzia interrupta (Totten, 1835); Pyrgiscus interrupta (Totten, 1835); Turbonilla fulvocincta auct. non Thompson, 1840; Odostomia fulvocincta auct. non Thompson, 1840; Pyrgiscus fulvocincta auct. non Thompson, 1840; Pyrgiscus acicula (Holmes, 1859); Turbonilla acicula Holmes, 1859; Pyrgiscus lineata (Holmes, 1859); Turbonilla lineata Holmes, 1859; Pyrgiscus quinquestriata (Holmes, 1859); Turbonilla quinquestriata Holmes, 1859; Pyrgiscus subulata (Holmes, 1859); Turbonilla subulata Holmes, 1859; Pyrgiscus areolata (A. E. Verrill, 1873); Turbonilla areolata A. E. Verrill, 1873; Pyrgiscus lineolata (Bush, 1899); Turbonilla lineolata Bush, 1899; Pyrgiscus cascoensis (Bartsch, 1909); Turbonilla cascoensis Bartsch, 1909; Turbonilla pseudointerrupta Bush, 1909; Pyrgiscus senilis (Bartsch, 1909); Turbonilla senilis Bartsch, 1909; Turbonilla vineae Bartsch, 1909; Pyrgiscus vineae (Bartsch, 1909); Turbonilla winkleyi Bartsch, 1909

= Turbonilla interrupta =

Species of gastropod

Turbonilla interrupta, common name the interrupted turbonille, is a species of sea snail, a marine gastropod mollusk in the family Pyramidellidae, the pyrams and their allies.

== Description ==
The shell grows to a length of 8 mm.

== Distribution ==
This species occurs in the following locations:

- Caribbean Sea: Cuba, Venezuela
- Gulf of Mexico: Mexico
- Lesser Antilles
- Atlantic Ocean: Gulf of Maine, Gulf of St Lawrence (Canada), Azores, Argentina
- Puerto Rico
- United Kingdom Exclusive Economic Zone
- Mediterranean Sea.

== Notes ==
Additional information regarding this species:

- Diet: generally for group, planktonic and minute detrital food items through either suspension or deposit feeding
- Dimensions: maximum size of 6 to 8 mm
- Distribution: Range: 47°N to 41.7°S; 97.7°W to 37°W. Distribution: Canada; Canada: Gulf of St. Lawrence, Nova Scotia; USA: Massachusetts, Rhode Island, New York, New Jersey, Georgia, Florida; Florida: East Florida, West Florida; USA: Louisiana, Texas; Mexico; Mexico: Tabasco, Veracruz, Campeche State, Yucatán State, Quintana Roo; Venezuela; Venezuela: Falcon; St. Vincent & the Grenadines: Grenada; Barbados, Brazil; Brazil: Amapa, Para, Ceara, Rio Grande do Norte, Rio de Janeiro, São Paulo, Parana; Uruguay, Argentina; Argentina: Buenos Aires, Rio Negro
- Habitat: infralittoral of the Gulf and estuary
- Reproduction: sexes are separate but are seldom conspicuously different externally, simultaneous hermaphrodites yet self-fertilization is prevented due to various morphological, physiological, or behavioral mechanisms; generally, marine gastropods shed their eggs
