= Ornithichnites =

Ornithichnites Temporal range: Early Jurassic, 201–190 Ma

Trace fossil classification
- Kingdom: Animalia
- Phylum: Chordata
- Class: Mammalia
- Ichnogenus: †Ornithichnites; Hitchcock, 1836

Type ichnospecies
- †Ornithichnites crassus Hitchcock, 1837

Other ichnospecies
- †Ornithichnites argenterae Portis, 1879

Trace fossil

Ornithichnites is an ichnotaxon of mammal footprint that was originally classified as a dinosaur. The name was originally used by Edward Hitchcock in 1836 as a higher group name rather than a specific ichnogenus, and thus the name does not have priority over specific ichnogeneric names even if they were first identified as Ornithichnites. Only two ichnospecies exist: O. crassus and O. argenterae.

== History and classification ==
The name Ornithichnites was introduced by American geologist Edward Hitchcock in 1836 in his study of fossil footprints from the Connecticut River Valley in Massachusetts. Hitchcock interpreted the footprints as those of birds, reflecting the early state of knowledge about fossil trackways before dinosaurs were scientifically recognized as a distinct group.

Some footprints originally assigned to Ornithichnites were later reclassified as dinosaur tracks. For example, the ichnospecies Ornithichnites giganteus was subsequently named Eubrontes giganteus.

The nomenclatural history of Ornithichnites is complicated because Hitchcock initially used the name for a broader group of fossil footprints rather than as a conventional, formally established ichnogenus.
