= Crepidula depressa =

Scientific classification
- Kingdom: Animalia
- Phylum: Mollusca
- Class: Gastropoda
- Subclass: Caenogastropoda
- Order: Littorinimorpha
- Family: Calyptraeidae
- Genus: Crepidula
- Species: C. depressa

Binomial name
- Crepidula depressa Say, 1822

Species of gastropod

Crepidula depressa is a species of sea snail, a marine gastropod mollusk in the family Calyptraeidae, the slipper snails or slipper limpets, cup-and-saucer snails, and hat snails.

== Distribution ==
Crepidula depressa occurs along the Gulf coast of Texas and the Yucatán Peninsula, both the Gulf and Atlantic coasts of Florida at least as far north as Lake Worth on the Atlantic coast.

== Description ==
The shell of C. depressa is generally flat and white, ranging from extremely recurved to somewhat convex depending on the habitat of the individual. Those from exposed substrates are often oval and convex. The septum is flat in convex shells and convex in recurved shells, with a notch on the right side where it attaches to the shell. There is also a depression in the center of the septal margin. Muscle scars are absent. The shell is white inside and out, rarely with pinkish-brown streaks. Length up to 4 cm. The translucent white body has opaque white on the tips on the tentacles and the lips and some white spots in the mantle and neck lappets. There is no black pigment on the foot and very little hint of yellow.

The maximum recorded shell length is 20 mm.

== Development ==
The small eggs produce typical planktotrophic veliger larvae with a smooth, almost planospiral shell at hatching. There are usually at least 100 eggs/capsule, but the number of eggs increases with female size. Average shell length at hatching is 255 μm. The larvae take 3–4 weeks to grow to metamorphosis.

== Habitat ==
Minimum recorded depth is 0 m. Maximum recorded depth is 3 m. This species lives on shells and inside shells inhabited by hermit crabs. Low intertidal to subtidal.
