= Riker Hill Art Park =

Coordinates: 40.8109°N 74.3181°W

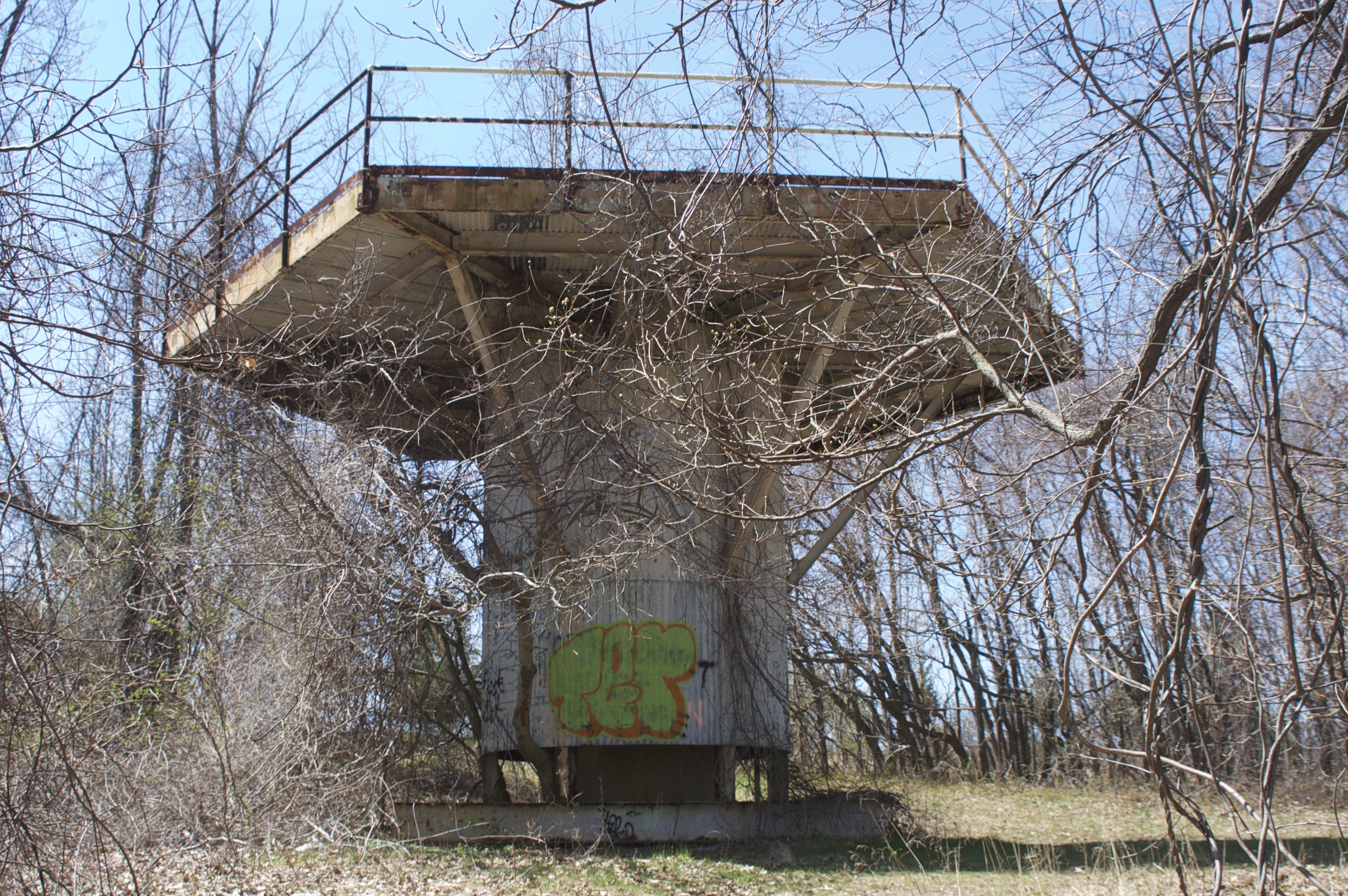
NY-79/80 Radar platform

Riker Hill Art Park is a former Nike Missile base which has become an artistic community in Livingston, Essex County, New Jersey. Together with the Walter Kidde Dinosaur Park and Becker Park, it is a part of the Riker Hill Complex. The Art Park provides studio space for working artists in various medias including painting, ceramics, glass blowing, woodworking, and sculpture. It also has a collection of outdoor sculpture.

== History ==
The Army closed the NY-79/80 Nike base in the mid 1970s and sold the 42 acres (17 ha) site to the county in 1974 for $1.

Dinosaurs and Colonial Squatters

Riker Hill, in western Essex County, has a history rich with Mesozoic monsters, colonial-era witchcraft, and 20th century defense. Two-Hundred-million years ago tiny dinosaurs left their footprints nearby, to be discovered in the late 1960s. In the middle of the 1700s the place was a concern to local landowners. As the tale goes, the wooded hill was occupied by a squatter, Peter Riker, and his mother, rumored to be a witch. Whether or not the stories about the Rikers were true, today the hill still bears their name. During the Cold War, Riker Hill became a vital link in the country's air defenses. Today it belongs to the Essex County Parks Department and the resident artists who sustain it.

The Cold War

Amid the peaceful rolling hills of Livingston, Cold War weapons made casual neighbors to suburban sub-developments from 1954 to 1974. The United States Army's Nike Air Defense System comprised a chain of anti-aircraft missile sites encircling major US cities, intended to intercept Soviet transcontinental nuclear bomber aircraft. Each Nike site consisted of a radar tracking and a missile launch facility. Riker Hill's elevation, one of the highest in the county, provided the optimal location for one of the project's radar installations with a clear line of sight for the defense of the New York Metro area. Dubbed "Control Area, Nike Battery NY-80," the radar station was responsible, in the event of an air attack, for tracking enemy aircraft and transmitting guidance information to missiles after launch. By the 1970s, advances in weapons systems made bomber aircraft, and countermeasures against them, obsolete, replaced instead with space-age intercontinental missiles.

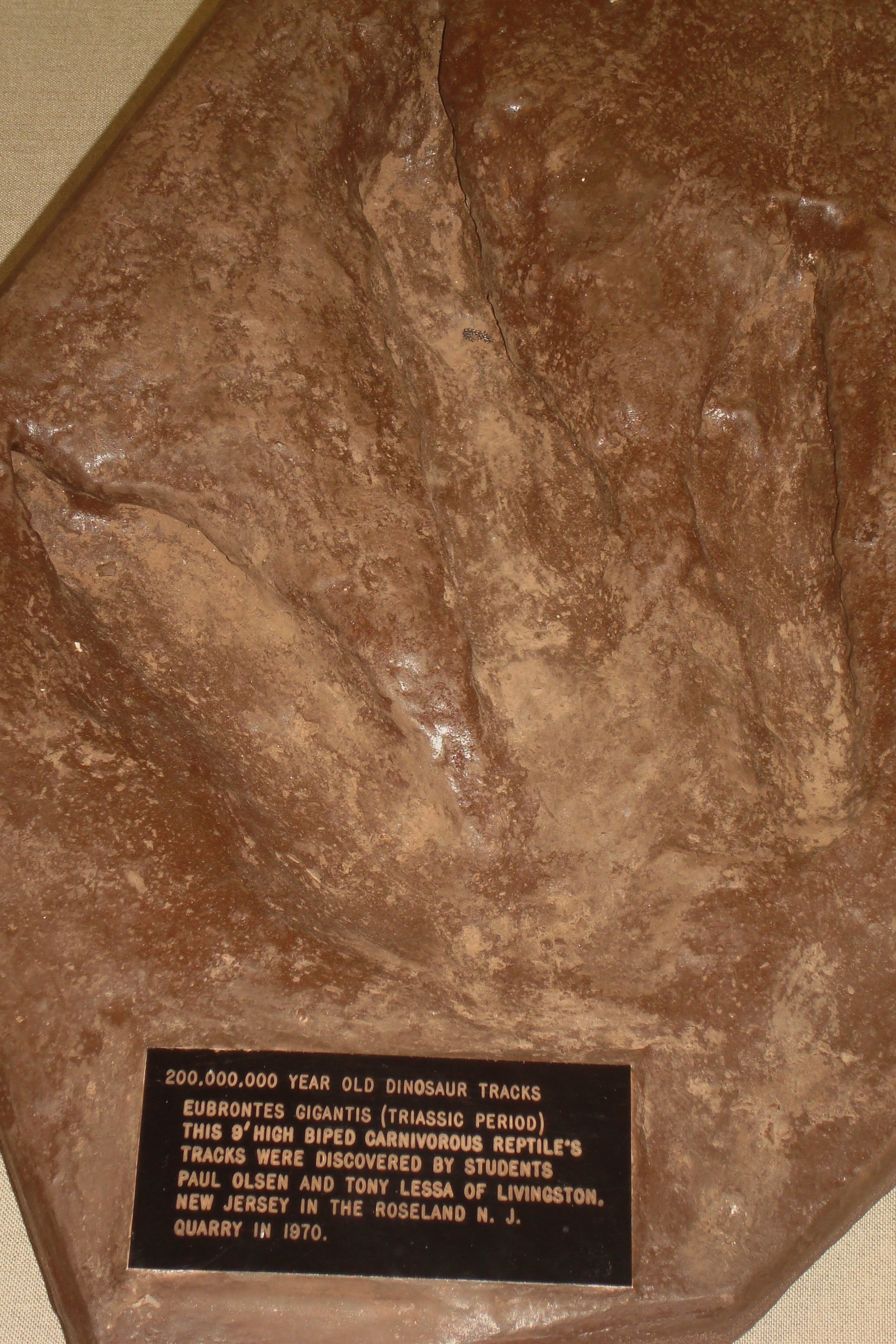
Cast of Eubrontes giganteus track made by Paul E. Olsen at the fossil site in 1970

Property Ownership Transfers from Federal to County

The Riker Hill Nike Battery Control Area NY-80 was decommissioned in 1974 and listed as surplus federal property. Essex County Parks entered a competitive application process for the land which drew the interest of other state and local agencies. The county's ownership of the 43 acre former Nike site was finalized in early 1977 with the recording of the deed. For the first few years Essex County operated a geology museum on the site, showcasing the dinosaur footprints and fossils discovered at the nearby quarry, but budget constraints and poor attendance at the small and isolated museum resulted in its closure.

Essex County Parks Department Creates the Art Park

The underused former military installation, with its squat cinderblock buildings, otherworldly half-deconstructed radar towers, and legacy of the Cold War, had inspired a different purpose. Local artists, and heads of the Essex County Parks Department, proposed the creation of a "self-sustaining complex of artists studios or craft facilities at Riker Hill." IN 1982, the Parks Department gave charge of Riker Hill to its Division of Cultural Affairs—but with no budget. Artists would self-support the Art Park by teaching classes to the public and selling their artwork, When the artists arrived, most of the buildings on the site had no heat, water, electric, roofs, windows, or doors. A tremendous amount of resourceful work would need to be undertaken to transform the barren and ascetic facility built for destructive war into a lively place of creative expression.

The Artists and the Community Build the Park

At Riker Hill Art Park, Building #509, was the first requisitioned by the nascent colony- because it was the only heated structure. Local corporations, such as NJ Bell Telephone and PSE&G, helped by donating lighting and electrical materials, furniture, and even windows and doors. Artists worked together to renovate the facility. In the first three years five outdoor sculptures were donated to Riker Hill ("Urban Bones," "Graceful Stones," 'Creation," "Colored Landscape," "Bicycle Flute"), giving it a true art park atmosphere. By the summer of 1986 all the buildings were occupied by a thriving arts community and the celebrated Summer Performing Arts Series began. The series was so popular that a stage had to be built the following year to accommodate more and larger performances such as Livingston Symphony Orchestra's first ever outdoor concert.

1990's The Park Continues to Evolve

Riker Hill Art Park continued to host several popular and ground breaking events such as Jazz Under the Stars, Shakespeare in the Park, the annual arts open house, architects consortium, and public group visits to the studios. In 1991 the park's three iconic, twenty-foot tall, stainless steel, "Whale Tail" outdoor sculptures were donated by the Livingston Mall. Also added that year were the graphics arts studio and the ceramics studio. By the mid-1990s Riker Hill was a fully functioning and comprehensive art facility featuring 35 studios including glass blowing, clay, photography, jewelry, weaving, steel sculpting, painting, and woodworking.

Riker Hill Today

Riker Hill Continues to evolve under the efforts of its resident artists and Essex County Department of Parks Recreation and Cultural Affairs to offer unique experiences through art. One of the founders of Riker Hill Art Park captured the spirit of the art park when he wrote of the experience at Riker Hill, "One of the magical charms of Riker Hill is the ability of the artists to work with each other. The jewelry artist began working with the potter. Soon the jewelry was appearing in the pottery designs and the pottery in the jewelry designs." (Ben Schaffer, "Annual Report, RHAP Assoc., 1991)

Essex County Department of Parks, Recreation, and Cultural Affairs Archivist - Park Records Management and Archives 115 Clifton Avenue Newark, New Jersey
