= Riker Hill Fossil Site =

Paleontological site in New Jersey, US

- Walter Kidde Dinosaur Park
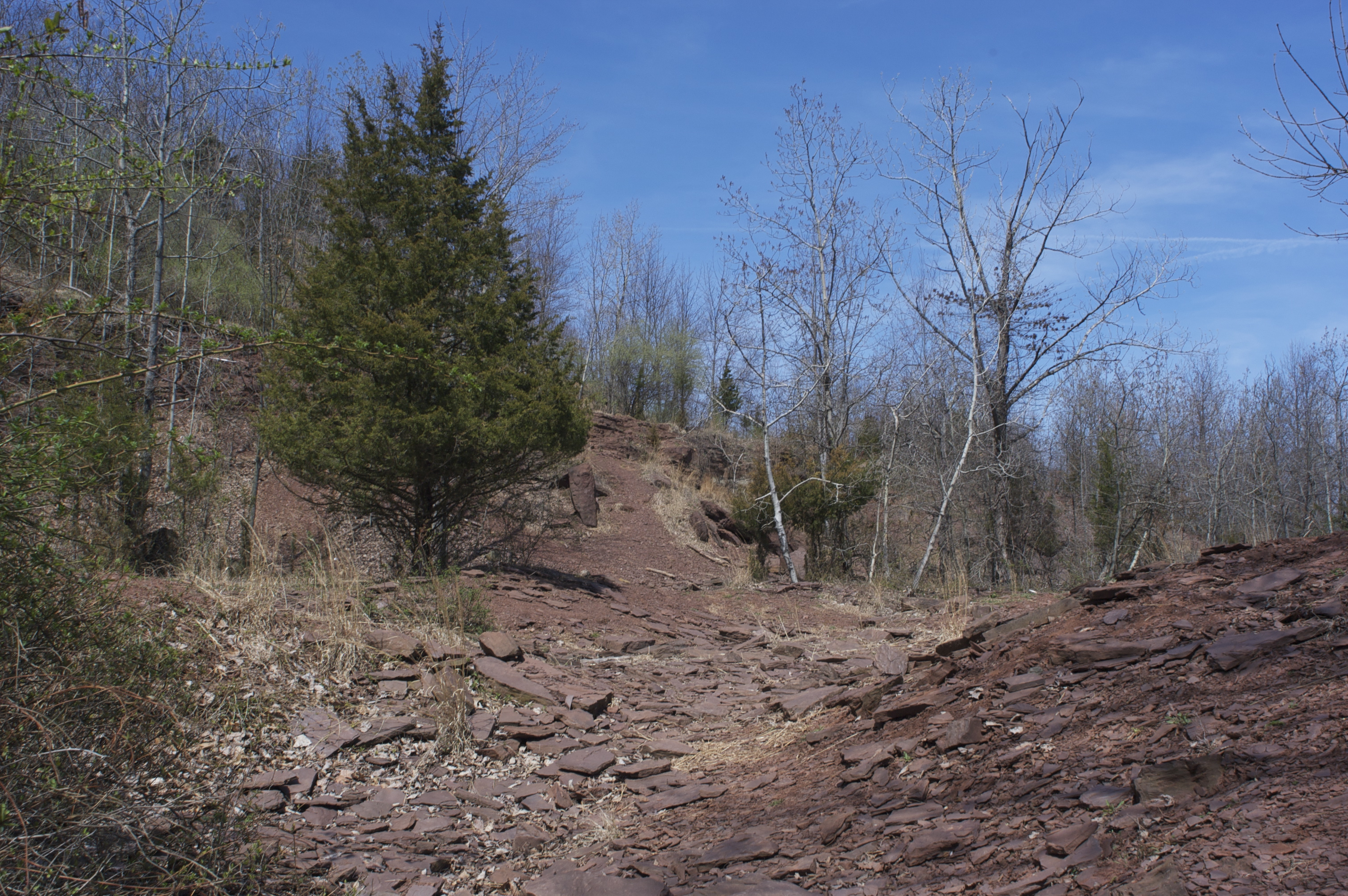

- Location within Essex County, New Jersey
- Location: Essex County, New Jersey
- Nearest city: Livingston
- Coordinates: 40°48′57″N 74°19′36″W
- Area: 16 acres (6.5 ha)
- Established: 1970

U.S. National Natural Landmark
- Designated: 1971

Riker Hill Fossil Site (also referred to as Walter Kidde Dinosaur Park) is a 16-acre (6.5 ha) paleontological site in Roseland in Essex County, New Jersey, United States, located at the south western side of the borough at the border between Roseland and Livingston. It is one of the major sites in United States where a large number of dinosaur tracks are preserved. It was declared a National Natural Landmark in June 1971.

== History ==
Originally, the site was part of a 55 acres (22 ha) stone quarry owned by the Kidde company called Roseland Quarry. In 1968, there was a discovery of dinosaur tracks on the quarry. With the news, a 14-year-old, Paul E. Olsen who lived in Livingston, and his friend Tony Lessa started visiting the quarry to study them. Over a period of a few years, they uncovered more than one thousand dinosaur, animal and insect tracks from the Late Triassic and Early Jurassic period.

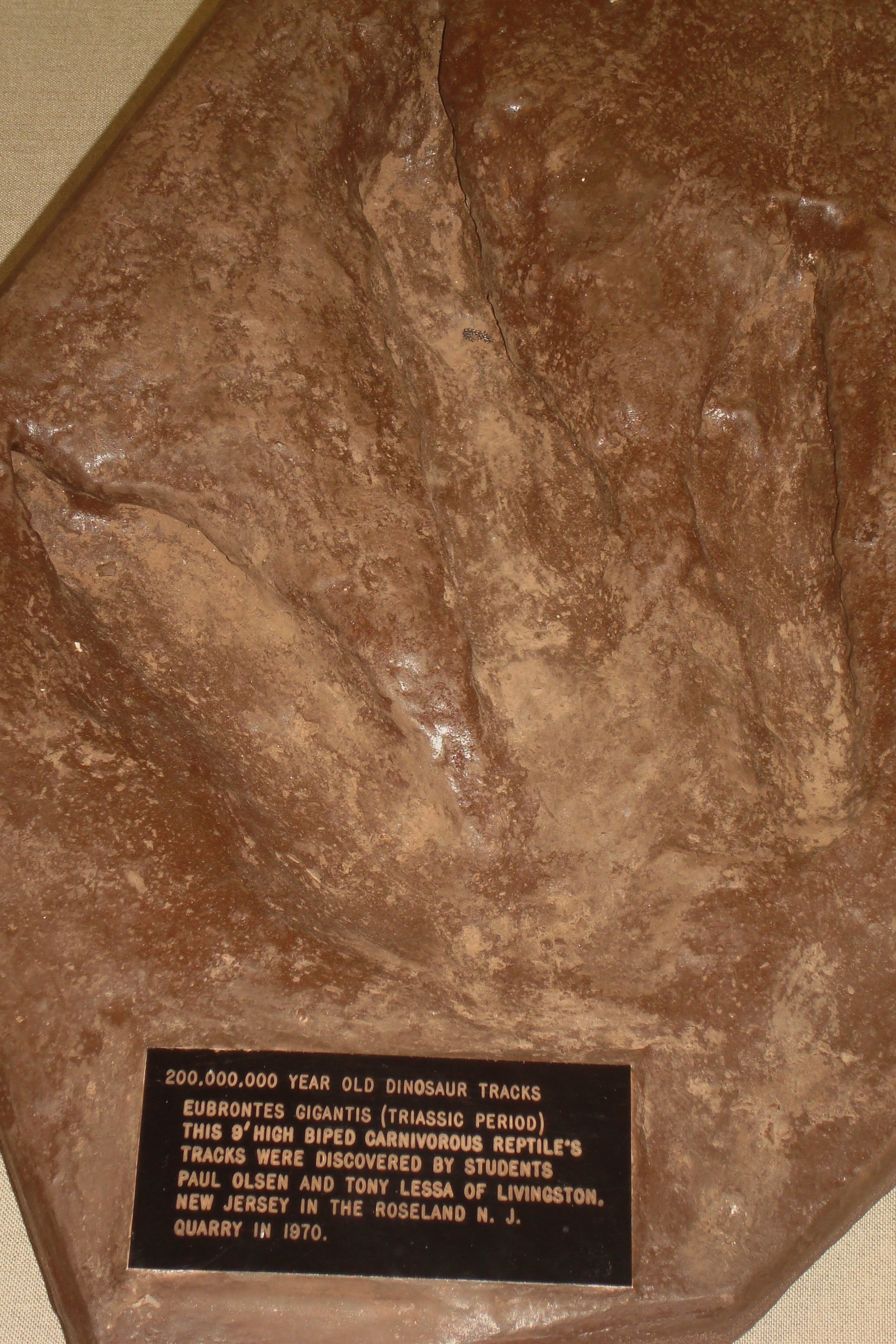
Cast of Eubrontes giganteus track made by Paul Olsen in 1970

When the fate of the quarry site became uncertain, the two teenagers came up with a plan to prevent the site from being developed. They made a cast from a footprint of Eubrontes giganteus and sent that to President Richard Nixon to get support. Eventually, the quarry was split. The most productive portion was preserved and donated to the Essex County Park Commission and named after Walter Kidde. The rest of the quarry was later developed into Nob Hill apartments. In June 1971, the preserved site was registered as a National Natural Landmark.

Currently, the site is now part of the Riker Hill Complex along with Riker Hill Art Park and Becker Park. For many years, the public was allowed to collect fossils at the site, but now access to the site is restricted.
