= Livingston, New Jersey =

Township in Essex County, New Jersey, US

- Township
- Montage: Livingston Town Center (top row), Town Hall (left row 2), street sign (right row 2), St. Barnabas Medical Center (row 3), Historic Force Homestead (left row 4) and Livingston Mall (right row 4)

- Township Logo

- Location of Livingston in Essex County highlighted in red (right). Inset map: Location of Essex County in New Jersey highlighted in orange (left).

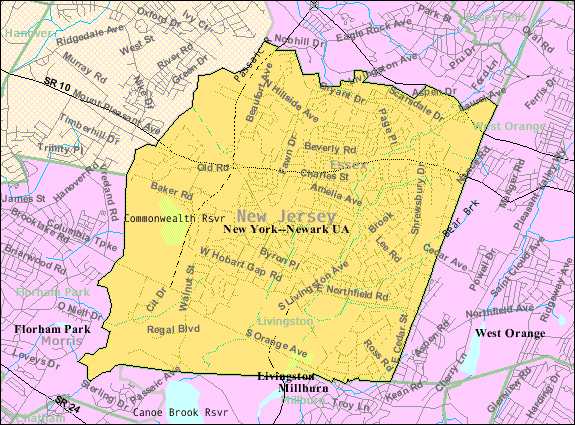
- Census Bureau map of Livingston, New Jersey

- Location in Essex County Location in New Jersey Location in the United States
- Coordinates: 40.785828°N 74.3291°W
- Country: United States
- State: New Jersey
- County: Essex
- Incorporated: February 5, 1813
- Named for: William Livingston

Government
  - Type: Faulkner Act (council–manager)
  - Body: Township Council
  - Mayor: Edward Meinhardt (D, term ends December 31, 2026)
  - Manager: Barry R. Lewis Jr.
  - Municipal clerk: Carolyn Mazzucco

Area
  - Total: 14.12 sq mi (36.57 km^{2})
  - Land: 13.78 sq mi (35.70 km^{2})
  - Water: 0.33 sq mi (0.86 km^{2}) 2.37%
  - Rank: 177th of 565 in state 2nd of 22 in county
- Elevation: 289 ft (88 m)

Population (2020)
  - Total: 31,330
  - Estimate (2025): 32,223
  - Rank: 75th of 565 in state 9th of 22 in county
  - Density: 2,272.8/sq mi (877.5/km^{2})
  - Rank: 275th of 565 in state 17th of 22 in county
- Time zone: UTC−05:00 (EST)
  - Summer (DST): UTC−04:00 (Eastern (EDT))
- ZIP Code: 07039
- Area code: 973
- FIPS code: 3401340890
- GNIS feature ID: 0882219
- Website: www.livingstonnj.org

Livingston is a township in Essex County, in the U.S. state of New Jersey. As of the 2020 United States census, the township's population was 31,330, its highest decennial count ever and an increase of 1,964 (+6.7%) from 29,366 recorded at the 2010 census, which in turn reflected an increase of 1,975 (+7.2%) from the 27,391 counted in the 2000 census. In 2025, the Population Estimates Program by the United States Census Bureau calculated that the township had a population of 32,223.

Livingston was incorporated as a township by an act of the New Jersey Legislature on February 5, 1813, from portions of Caldwell Township (now Fairfield Township) and Springfield Township (now in Union County). Portions of the original township were later taken to form Fairmount (March 11, 1862, now part of West Orange) and Roseland (March 10, 1908).

The township was named for William Livingston, the first Governor of New Jersey; his family's coat of arms served as the township's seal for many years.

The community has been one of the state's highest-income communities. Based on data from the American Community Survey for 2013–2017, township residents had a median household income of $153,381, ranked 14th in the state among municipalities with more than 10,000 residents, more than double the statewide median of $76,475.

== History ==
Livingston's history dates back to 1699 when 101 settlers from Newark wanted to move westward. They set up a committee to negotiate with Lenni Lenape Native Americans for the purchase of the Horseneck Tract which today includes Livingston and eight other municipalities in northern Essex County. Between 1698 and 1702, the rules for property ownership were unclear. There were many disputes between settlers and the English proprietors. For some unknown reasons, the Newark settlers did not obtain a grant from the proprietors before negotiating with the native tribes. They finally obtained the deed directly from Lenni Lenape in 1702 for £130. The settlements began until around the 1740s as the dispute between the proprietors and the settlers continued.

The dispute came to a breaking point in September 1745 when the East Jersey proprietors began to evict a settler only six months after a house fire in Newark completely destroyed the original deed, which was the only evidence of the purchase. During that period, William Livingston who was one of the few landed aristocrats joined the settlers against the proprietors. Livingston owned land around today's south western corner of the Township of Livingston. His land, like other settlers, was levied with quit rents in the amount 40 shillings per acre. He defended many settlers who were jailed for refusing to pay the quit rents.

This series of events caused the settlers, led by Timothy Meeker, to form a group to riot against the British government. The Horseneck Riots lasted for 10 years from 1745 to 1755. The group was also one of the first colonial militia which had periodic battles for 32 years leading up to the Revolutionary War as the group joined the Continental Army in 1776.

After the American Revolutionary War, more permanent settlements took place with the first school built in 1783. In 1811, a petition was filed to incorporate the township from about 100 people who lived in seven distinct areas: Centerville (separated to become Roseland, in 1908), Cheapside (now Livingston Mall), Morehousetown (now Livingston Circle), Northfield (now Northfield Center), Squiretown (now the Cerebral Palsy Institute of New Jersey on Old Road), Teedtown (now Livingston Center), and Washington Place (now near the border with Millburn). On February 5, 1813, the township was officially incorporated. The first town meeting was held on the same day and they decided to run the township by a Township Committee system.

During the 1800s, lumber and farming were major industries in the town. Shoemaking and dairy farming became major industries during and after the Civil War. However, the population grew slowly because it was not easily accessible. Mt. Pleasant Avenue—which was one of the first turnpikes in New Jersey—was the only primary access to the town through stagecoaches.

The population grew quickly after the 1920s when automobiles became more accessible. As a suburb of Newark, the town experienced many housing developments especially after World War II with its peak in 1970 of more than thirty thousand residents. During this growth period, many services were organized including public library in 1916, volunteer Fire Department in 1922, first regular police chief in 1923, an ambulance unit in 1937 which became first aid squad in 1949. Some major relocations took place during this period of growing population shift. Cooperman Barnabas Medical Center (formerly Saint Barnabas Medical Center) and Newark Academy moved from Newark to Livingston in 1964.

The last surviving Harrison Cider Apple tree, the most famous of the 18th-century Newark cider apple trees, was rescued from extinction in 1976 in Livingston.

Today, around 30,000 people live in this suburban community, which lies around an hour's drive from New York City. Its school system—which has been nationally recognized since 1998—and other programs have been drawing new residents to the town. Its population has maintained a level of diversity while the residents continue the tradition of community volunteerism.

== Geography ==
According to the U.S. Census Bureau, the township had a total area of 14.12 square miles (36.57 km^{2}), including 13.79 square miles (35.7 km^{2}) of land and 0.33 square miles (0.86 km^{2}) of water (2.37%). Livingston is in the New York metropolitan area. It is in southwestern Essex County. Within Essex County it is bordered by Roseland to the north, West Orange to the east, and Millburn (including Short Hills) to the south. To the west it is bordered by Morris County communities Florham Park and East Hanover. The western border is the Passaic River.

Localities and place names located partially or completely within the township include Cedar Ridge, Cheapside, Moorehoustown, Northfield, Washington Place and West Livingston.

== Demographics ==
Historical population
| Census | Pop. | Note | %± |
|---|---|---|---|
| 1820 | 1,056 | | — |
| 1830 | 1,150 | | 8.9% |
| 1840 | 1,081 | | −6.0% |
| 1850 | 1,151 | | 6.5% |
| 1860 | 1,323 | | 14.9% |
| 1870 | 1,157 | * | −12.5% |
| 1880 | 1,401 | | 21.1% |
| 1890 | 1,197 | | −14.6% |
| 1900 | 1,412 | | 18.0% |
| 1910 | 1,025 | * | −27.4% |
| 1920 | 1,126 | | 9.9% |
| 1930 | 3,476 | | 208.7% |
| 1940 | 5,972 | | 71.8% |
| 1950 | 9,932 | | 66.3% |
| 1960 | 23,124 | | 132.8% |
| 1970 | 30,127 | | 30.3% |
| 1980 | 28,040 | | −6.9% |
| 1990 | 26,609 | | −5.1% |
| 2000 | 27,391 | | 2.9% |
| 2010 | 29,366 | | 7.2% |
| 2020 | 31,330 | | 6.7% |
| 2025 (est.) | 32,223 | | 2.9% |
Population sources: 1820–1920; 1840 1850–1870 1850; 1870 1880–1890; 1890–1910 1910–1930; 1940–2000 2000; 2010 2020 * = Lost territory in previous decade.

According to the 2002 results of the National Jewish Population Survey, there were 12,600 Jews in Livingston, approximately 46% of the population, one of the highest percentages of Jews in any American municipality. The neighboring towns of South Orange and Millburn also have high Jewish populations.

In a report performed by the United Way of Northern New Jersey based on 2012 data, around 14% of Livingston households were classified as "Asset Limited, Income Constrained, Employed" households (below a threshold of $50,000 for households below 65, below $35,000 for those over 65), struggling with basic necessities, such as housing, childcare, food, health care, and transportation, compared to 38% statewide and 47% in Essex County.

=== 2020 census ===
Livingston Township, Essex County, New Jersey – Racial and ethnic composition Note: the US Census treats Hispanic/Latino as an ethnic category. This table excludes Latinos from the racial categories and assigns them to a separate category. Hispanics/Latinos may be of any race.
| Race / Ethnicity (NH = Non-Hispanic) | Pop 2010 | Pop 2020 | % 2010 | % 2020 |
|---|---|---|---|---|
| White alone (NH) | 21,535 | 18,812 | 73.33% | 60.04% |
| Black or African American alone (NH) | 632 | 953 | 2.15% | 3.04% |
| Native American or Alaska Native alone (NH) | 9 | 12 | 0.03% | 0.04% |
| Asian alone (NH) | 5,609 | 9,014 | 19.10% | 28.77% |
| Pacific Islander alone (NH) | 5 | 4 | 0.02% | 0.01% |
| Some Other Race alone (NH) | 43 | 177 | 0.15% | 0.56% |
| Mixed Race or Multi-Racial (NH) | 341 | 775 | 1.16% | 2.47% |
| Hispanic or Latino (any race) | 1,192 | 1,583 | 4.06% | 5.05% |
| Total | 29,366 | 31,330 | 100.00% | 100.00% |

=== 2010 census ===
The 2010 United States census counted 29,366 people, 9,990 households, and 8,272 families in the township. The population density was 2,132.8 per square mile (823.5/km^{2}). There were 10,284 housing units at an average density of 746.9 per square mile (288.4/km^{2}). The racial makeup was 76.17% (22,367) White, 2.26% (663) Black or African American, 0.07% (20) Native American, 19.21% (5,642) Asian, 0.02% (5) Pacific Islander, 0.86% (254) from other races, and 1.41% (415) from two or more races. Hispanic or Latino of any race were 4.06% (1,192) of the population.

Of the 9,990 households, 41.5% had children under the age of 18; 73.5% were married couples living together; 6.8% had a female householder with no husband present and 17.2% were non-families. Of all households, 15.2% were made up of individuals and 10.3% had someone living alone who was 65 years of age or older. The average household size was 2.91 and the average family size was 3.24.

27.0% of the population were under the age of 18, 4.7% from 18 to 24, 21.2% from 25 to 44, 30.3% from 45 to 64, and 16.8% who were 65 years of age or older. The median age was 43.3 years. For every 100 females, the population had 94.6 males. For every 100 females ages 18 and older there were 90.1 males.

The Census Bureau's 2006–2010 American Community Survey showed that (in 2010 inflation-adjusted dollars) median household income was $129,208 (with a margin of error of +/− $6,377) and the median family income was $143,429 (+/− $10,622). Males had a median income of $100,075 (+/− $11,306) versus $71,213 (+/− $7,102) for females. The per capita income for the township was $60,577 (+/− $3,918). About 1.1% of families and 2.3% of the population were below the poverty line, including 0.6% of those under age 18 and 1.7% of those age 65 or over.

=== 2000 census ===
As of the 2000 United States census there were 27,391 people, 9,300 households, and 7,932 families residing in the town. The population density was 1,973.1 inhabitants per square mile (761.8/km^{2}). There were 9,457 housing units at an average density of 681.2 per square mile (263.0/km^{2}). The racial makeup of the township was 82.64% White, 14.54% Asian, 1.20% African American, 0.05% Native American, 0.01% Pacific Islander, 0.69% from other races, and 0.87% from two or more races. Hispanic or Latino of any race were 2.54% of the population.

There were 9,300 households, out of which 41.8% had children under the age of 18 living with them, 76.0% were married couples living together, 7.0% had a female householder with no husband present, and 14.7% were non-families. 13.0% of all households were made up of individuals, and 8.4% had someone living alone who was 65 years of age or older. The average household size was 2.93 and the average family size was 3.21.

In the township the age distribution of the population shows 26.6% under the age of 18, 4.6% from 18 to 24, 26.6% from 25 to 44, 26.8% from 45 to 64, and 15.4% who were 65 years of age or older. The median age was 41 years. For every 100 females, there were 94.7 males. For every 100 females age 18 and over, there were 90.3 males.

The median income for a household in the township was $98,869, and the median income for a family was $108,049. Males had a median income of $77,256 versus $41,654 for females. The per capita income for the town was $47,218. 1.8% of the population and 1.1% of families were below the poverty line. Out of the total people living in poverty, 1.2% are under the age of 18 and 3.2% are 65 or older.

== Economy ==
=== Shopping and dining ===
Although largely a bedroom community, there are many stores and restaurants located in Livingston, in three main shopping areas. The first area is located in the center of the town. It stretches along Livingston Avenue from Route 10 to Northfield Avenue. Historically, the area has been dominated by small local stores, but retains some national chain stores. With the addition of Livingston Town Center, classified as mixed-use development, new restaurants have opened as well, adding to the large number of locally owned establishments.

The second area is the Livingston Mall located at the south-western corner of the town. Macy's occupies one of the original three wings the mall. Sears, the original anchor in the second wing, announced its closure in February 2020, while Lord & Taylor, the third original anchor, shut down on December 29, 2020. The fourth wing, added in 2008, is home of Barnes & Noble. Still open in February 2026, but with the numbers of shoppers diminishing and key anchors Macy's and Barnes & Noble planning to close, the mall has been described as a "zombie mall" that was "quiet, dim and stripped of the crowds" during the holiday shopping season, making the mall seem "basically dead".

The third shopping area begins the Route 10 shopping corridor that extends to East Hanover.

=== Corporate residents ===
Many office parks are located along Eisenhower Parkway on the western side of the town. There are a few headquarters of major companies including former CIT Group corporate headquarters, CoreWeave, Inteplast Group, The Briad Group, and customer service and support center of Verizon New Jersey.

There are varieties of other services in the township. The Westminster Hotel is located on the western side of the town. Fitness facilities include West Essex YMCA. A Jewish Community Center with fitness center also exists just over the border in West Orange.

Cooperman Barnabas Medical Center, a 597-bed hospital established in 1865, is located in the southern side of the town near West Orange and Millburn.

Livingston also has a local Public-access television station (Livingston TV on Comcast TV-34 and Verizon FiOS 26), which is maintained by Livingston High School Students as well as the LPBC (Livingston Public Broadcasting Committee).

== Arts and culture ==
=== Performing arts ===
Livingston is home of several performing arts organizations:

- Livingston Symphony Orchestra is a group of community-based performers which was formed in 1960. The symphony orchestra is currently directed by Anthony LaGruth. It holds limited performances during each season.
- Livingston Community Players is a community-based theatre organization. There has been many productions in the recent years. The performers are from local community and other places in New Jersey. Past productions, including The Sound of Music, Oliver!, and Annie, received Perry Awards from New Jersey Association of Community Theatres.
- Children's Theatre of Livingston is a local organization that provides performance opportunities for Livingston children grades 2 to 8. The children are trained in acting roles and staging staff. It has annual performance since the first season in 2007.
- New Jersey Ballet is a major ballet company based in Livingston. The company is recognized nationally and internationally with tours in many countries in Europe, Asia and North America. Livingston is also the headquarters of New Jersey School of Ballet which offers many classes in Ballet, Jazz and Tap.

=== Fine arts ===
Livingston has many local artists in varied forms. Local artists have support from Livingston Arts Association, an organization formed in 1959 to promote art in the community including large scale exhibitions, demonstrations, and workshops. The organization is also a member of Arts Council of Livingston which has a gallery at Livingston Town Center. The Arts Association includes numerous organizations in addition to the Arts Council of Livingston, including the NJ State Opera Guild—West Essex Chapter and Livingston Camera Club. The Arts Council of Livingston regularly exhibits art at the Livingston Town Hall.

There are many studios at Riker Hill Art Park with more than 40 working artists in various media including pottery, fine metalwork, glass, jewelry, paintings, fine arts, sculpture and photography. Many studios offer art classes for adults and children.

== Sports ==
From 1984 to 1989, Livingston was the site of the Grand Prix tennis circuit tournament, the Livingston Open, held at Newark Academy. The Grand Prix was the only professional circuit since 1985 before it was succeeded by the ATP Tour in 1990. The tournament was won by Andre Agassi in 1988, earning him the seventh title in his career.

== Parks and recreation ==
=== Parks ===
There are more than 470 acres (1.9 km^{2}) of wooded parks with passive hiking trails in Livingston. Additional 1,817 acres (7.35 km^{2}) are zoned to be preserved in its natural state without public access. This brings to about 25% of total land in the town that is in its natural conditions with habitats of eight threatened or endangered species.

There are smaller parks and open space areas dedicated to recreation and sports, mostly centered around the town's public schools. These include two swimming pools, one of which, Northland Pool, is no longer open to the public, ten little league baseball diamonds, four full baseball diamonds, eight full soccer/lacrosse fields, one full football field, three basketball courts, sixteen tennis courts, eleven playgrounds, a jogging track, a dog park, and a fishing/ice skating pond. The township is planning to build inter-connected mixed-use paths, biking and hiking trails to connect those parks and open space throughout the township.

Livingston has an active open space trust fund that continues to acquire more lands for preservation and recreation. As of 2003, there were 842 acres (9% of total land) that were protected from development. There were additional 2,475 acres (10.02 km^{2}) that could be protected by the fund.

=== Riker Hill Complex ===
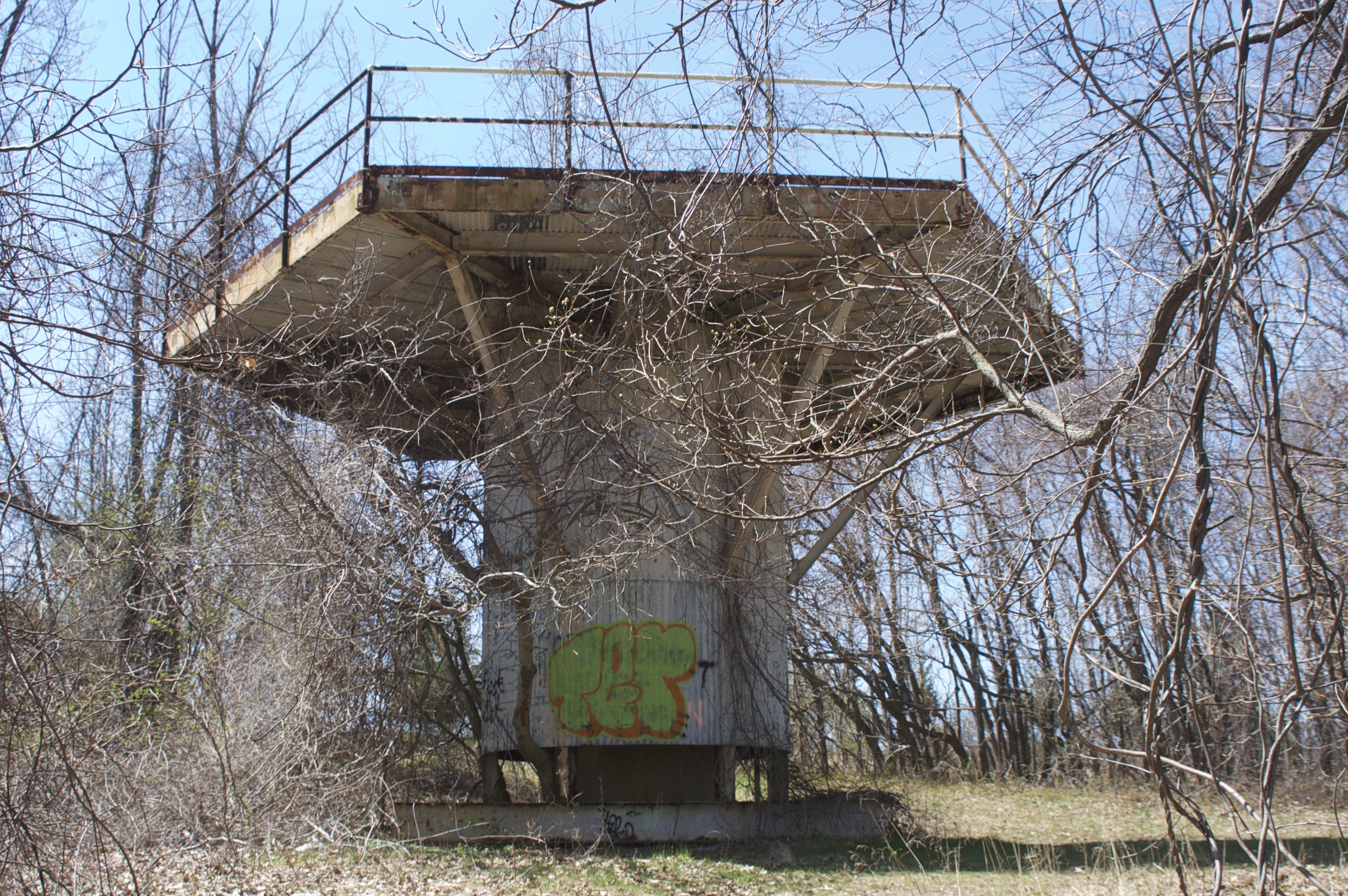
A radio tower in the Riker Hill Complex

Riker Hill Complex (also referred to as Riker Hill Art Park) is a 204-acre (0.83 km^{2}) parkland located along the border of Livingston and Roseland, which was acquired between 1969 and 1977 through county funds and the state's Green Acres program. The complex is managed by the Essex County Department of Parks, Recreation, and Cultural Affairs. It comprises three parks, Riker Hill Art Park—a former Nike Missile control area site on 42 acres (17 ha), Walter Kidde Dinosaur Park—a National Natural Landmark on 16 acres (6.5 ha) that is not publicly accessible, and the undeveloped Becker Park on 147 acres (59 ha). Although a large portion of the complex is located within Roseland, the county designated Livingston as the host community as the Riker Hill Art Park is the only functional and publicly accessible park at the present time. The art park located atop of the hill is home of many studios in multiple disciplines of art and craft.

=== Recreation ===
The recreation department under the Senior, Youth and Leisure Services program offers programs for residents ranging from pre-school courses, children games, crafts, and dance to youth and adult sports programs to special programming for seniors. Programming also grew during Covid to include various virtual exercise, meditation, and other types of programs and virtual events. The recreation department's variety of services and programs for adults ages 62+ includes educational, sports, special events, concerts, and locally available transportation via several new vans. The recreation department has proven innovative in working to provide programs and services safely throughout the pandemic. Prior to 2020, residents enjoyed two pools, Haines Pool and Northland Pool. Since then, Northland Pool has been mainly closed to residents. There are many independent sports organizations such as Livingston Little League, Livingston Jr. Lancers (football and cheerleading), Livingston Lacrosse Club, and Livingston Soccer Club.

== Government ==
=== Local government ===
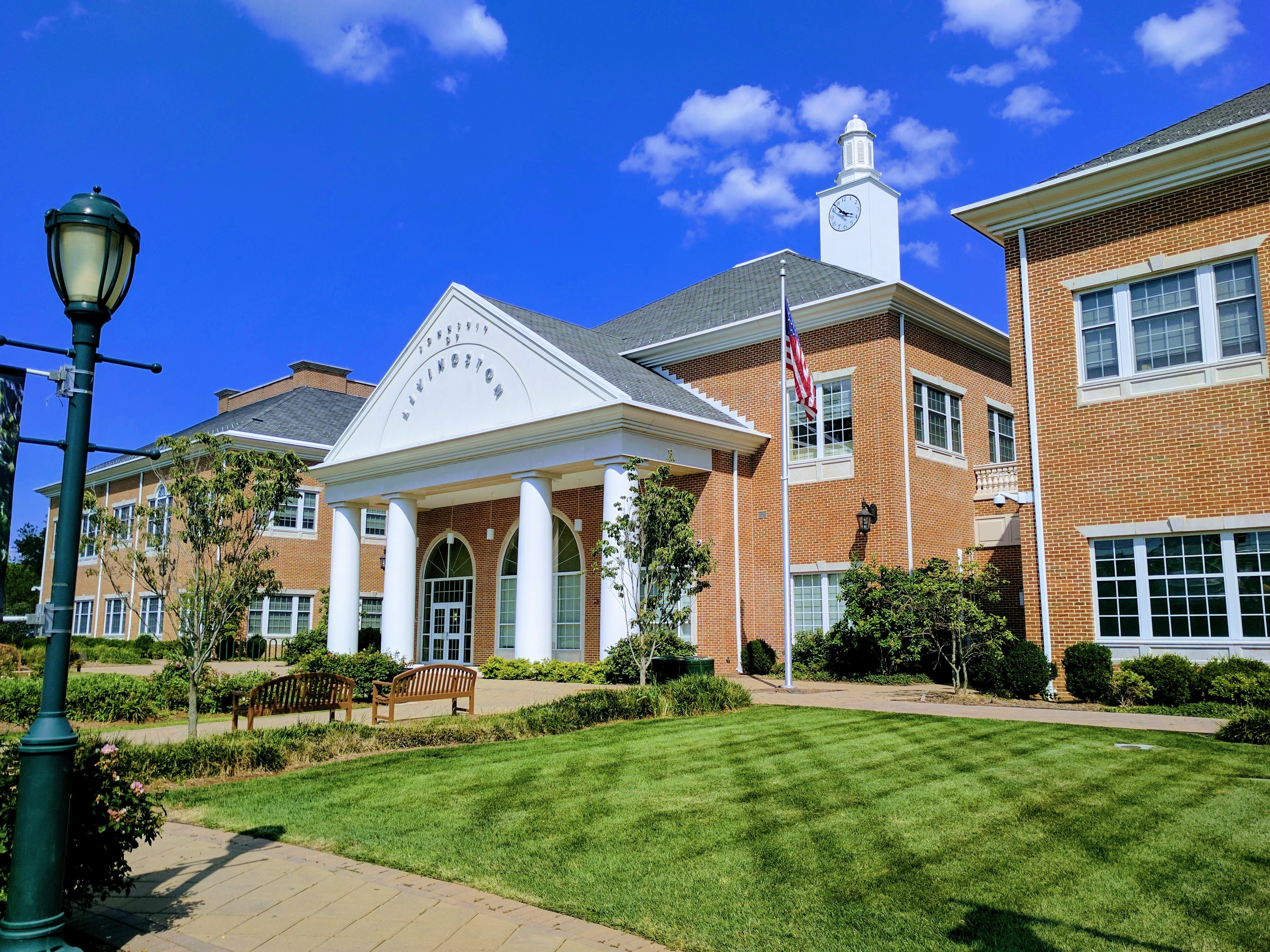
Livingston Town Hall

Livingston has operated since 1957 within the Faulkner Act, formally known as the Optional Municipal Charter Law, under the Council-Manager form of municipal government. The township is one of 42 municipalities (of the 564) statewide that use this form of government. Livingston's Township Council is comprised of five members, elected to four-year terms of office on a staggered basis, with either two or three seats coming up for election in even-numbered years. A Mayor and Deputy Mayor are selected by the Council from among its members at a reorganization meeting held after each election.

As of 2025, members of the Township Council are Mayor Edward Meinhardt (D, term on council and as mayor ends December 31, 2026), Deputy Mayor Shawn R. Klein (D, term on council and as deputy mayor ends 2026), Alfred M. Anthony (D, 2028), Ketan K. Bhuptani (D, 2026; elected to serve an unexpired term) and Michael M. Vieira (D, 2028).

In February 2024, Ketan Bhuptani, the township's first Asian-American councilmember, was sworn in to fill the seat expiring in December 2026 that became vacant after Rosy Bagolie stepped down from council and took office in the New Jersey General Assembly the previous month. Bhuptani served on an interim basis until the November 2024 general election, when he was chosen a candidate to serve the balance of the term of office.

In February 2019, after the Township Council failed to choose a candidate, the Democratic municipal committee selected Michael Vieira to fill the seat expiring in December 2020 that became vacant following the resignation of Michael M. Silverman. Vieira served on an interim basis until the November 2019 general election, when voters elected him to serve the balance of the term of office.

The Township Manager is Barry R. Lewis Jr., whose tenure began on March 1, 2018. The previous Township Managers were Robert H. Harp (1954–1985), Charles J. Tahaney (1985–2005), and Michele E. Meade (2005–2016). Gregory J. Bonin served for a single week in 2017 before resigning, and Deputy Township Manager Russell A. Jones Jr. served as Acting Township Manager for the rest of the interval between Meade and Lewis.

During the Covid-19 pandemic in March 2020, meetings for local governance were being held through Zoom and Facebook livestream; meetings continue to be broadcast over Facebook livestream, offering broader public access.

==== Police Department ====
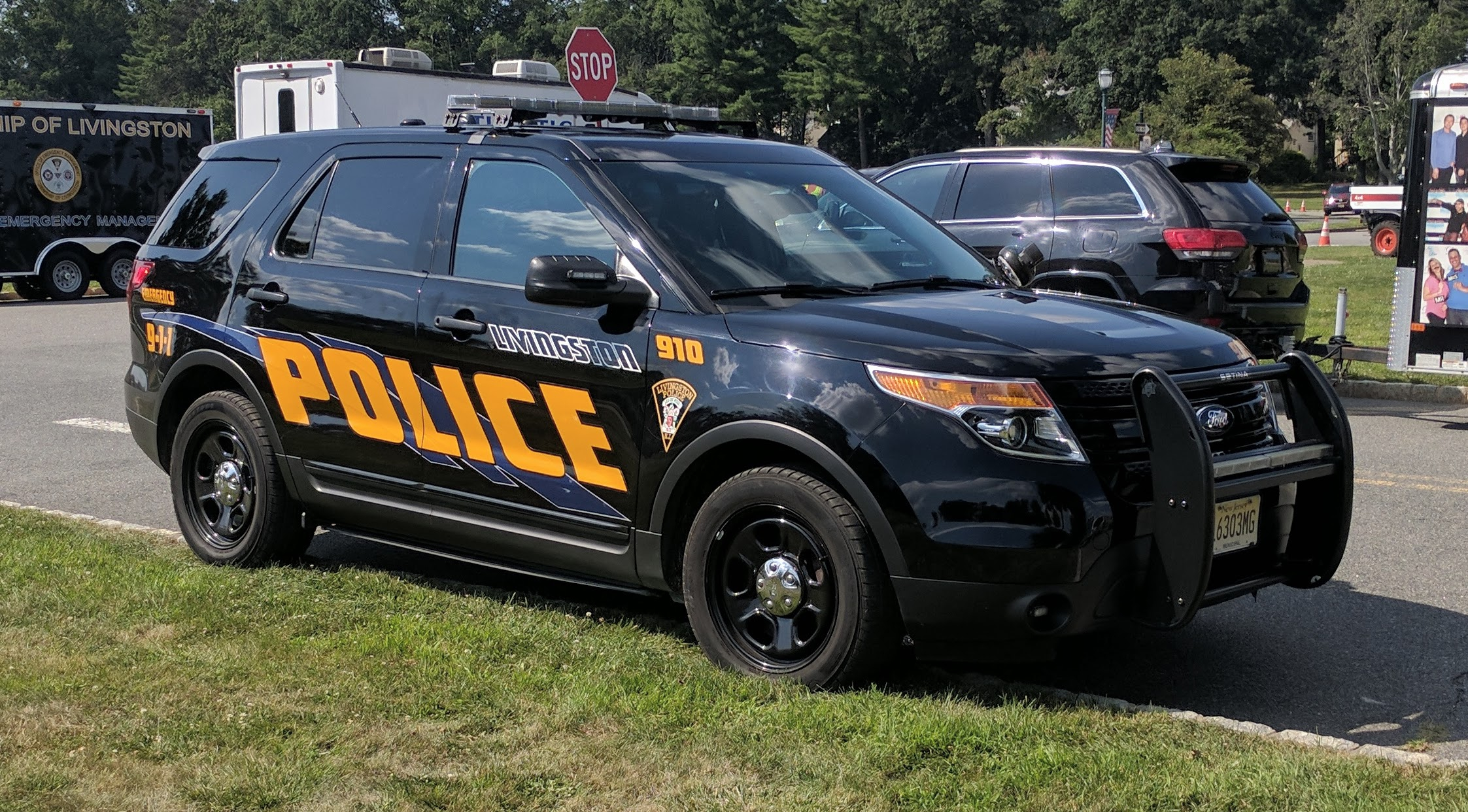
An SUV of the Livingston Police Department

The Livingston Police Department (LPD) was established in 1813. It consists of the following divisions: Patrol, Traffic, Communications (911 dispatch), Police Records, Internal Affairs, and Community Policing. Bureaus include the Detective and Juvenile bureaus.

==== Volunteer organizations ====
There are more than 40 volunteer committees and boards operated by the Township, including Livingston Municipal Alliance Committee (LMAC), Holiday Committees, Consumer Affairs Office, Planning Board, Zoning Board of Adjustment, and Committee for Diversity & Inclusion.

Volunteer-based public safety organizations include the Livingston Auxiliary Police, Livingston Fire Department and Livingston First Aid Squad.

=== Federal, state, and county representation ===
Livingston is located in the 11th Congressional District and is part of New Jersey's 27th state legislative district. Prior to the 2010 Census, Livingston had been split between the 8th Congressional District and the 11th Congressional District, a change made by the New Jersey Redistricting Commission that took effect in January 2013, based on the results of the November 2012 general elections.

For the 119th United States Congress, New Jersey's 11th congressional district is represented by Analilia Mejia (D, Glen Ridge) who was elected in a 2026 special election to serve for the remainder of the Congress following the resignation Mikie Sherrill (D, Montclair), who was elected Governor of New Jersey in 2025. New Jersey is represented in the United States Senate by Democrats Cory Booker (Newark, term ends 2027) and Andy Kim (Moorestown, term ends 2031).

For the 2026–2027 session, the 27th legislative district of the New Jersey Legislature is represented in the State Senate by John F. McKeon (D, West Orange) and in the General Assembly by Rosy Bagolie (D, Livingston) and Alixon Collazos-Gill (D, Montclair).

Essex County is governed by a directly elected county executive, with legislative functions performed by the Board of County Commissioners. As of 2025, the County Executive is Joseph N. DiVincenzo Jr. (D, Roseland), whose four-year term of office ends December 31, 2026. The county's Board of County Commissioners is composed of nine members, five of whom are elected from districts and four of whom are elected on an at-large basis. They are elected for three-year concurrent terms and may be re-elected to successive terms at the annual election in November. Essex County's Commissioners are:

Robert Mercado (D, District 1 – Newark's North and East Wards, parts of Central and West Wards; Newark, 2026), A'Dorian Murray-Thomas (D, District 2 – Irvington, Maplewood and parts of Newark's South and West Wards; Newark, 2026), Vice President Tyshammie L. Cooper (D, District 3 - Newark: West and Central Wards; East Orange, Orange and South Orange; East Orange, 2026), Leonard M. Luciano (D, District 4 – Caldwell, Cedar Grove, Essex Fells, Fairfield, Livingston, Millburn, North Caldwell, Roseland, Verona, West Caldwell and West Orange; West Caldwell, 2026), President Carlos M. Pomares (D, District 5 – Belleville, Bloomfield, Glen Ridge, Montclair and Nutley; Bloomfield, 2026), Brendan W. Gill (D, at large; Montclair, 2026), Romaine Graham (D, at large; Irvington, 2026), Wayne Richardson (D, at large; Newark, 2026), Patricia Sebold (D, at-large; Livingston, 2026).

Constitutional officers elected countywide are: Clerk Christopher J. Durkin (D, West Caldwell, 2025), Register of Deeds Juan M. Rivera Jr. (D, Newark, 2029), Sheriff Amir Jones (D, Newark, 2027), and Surrogate Alturrick Kenney (D, Newark, 2028).

=== Politics ===
As of October 2022, there were a total of 23,689 registered voters in Livingston, of which 9,221 (39%) were registered as Democrats, 4,140 (17%) were registered as Republicans and 10,217 (43%) were registered as Unaffiliated. There were 49 voters registered as Libertarians or Greens.

United States presidential election results for Livingston
| Year | Republican | | Democratic | | Third party(ies) | |
| Year | No. | % | No. | % | No. | % |
|---|---|---|---|---|---|---|
| 2024 | 6,381 | 39.90% | 9,378 | 58.65% | 232 | 1.45% |
| 2020 | 6,307 | 34.66% | 11,773 | 64.70% | 117 | 0.64% |
| 2016 | 5,475 | 37.23% | 9,052 | 61.56% | 178 | 1.21% |
| 2012 | 6,863 | 48.05% | 7,303 | 51.13% | 116 | 0.81% |
| 2008 | 6,920 | 45.26% | 8,244 | 53.92% | 124 | 0.81% |
| 2004 | 6,657 | 44.82% | 8,101 | 54.54% | 96 | 0.65% |

In the 2016 presidential election, Democrat Hillary Clinton received 60.8% of the vote (9,052 cast), ahead of Republican Donald Trump with 36.8% (5,475 votes), and other candidates with 2.5% (367 votes), among the 15,235 ballots cast by the township's 22,664 registered voters (341 ballots were spoiled), for a turnout of 67.2%. In the 2012 presidential election, Democrat Barack Obama received 51.1% of the vote (7,303 cast), ahead of Republican Mitt Romney with 48.1% (6,863 votes), and other candidates with 0.8% (116 votes), among the 14,371 ballots cast by the township's 21,225 registered voters (89 ballots were spoiled), for a turnout of 67.7%. In the 2008 presidential election, Democrat Barack Obama received 53.4% of the vote here (8,244 cast), ahead of Republican John McCain with 44.8% (6,920 votes) and other candidates with 0.8% (122 votes), among the 15,433 ballots cast by the township's 20,367 registered voters, for a turnout of 75.8%.

Gubernatorial election results for Livingston
| Year | Republican | | Democratic | | Third party(ies) | |
| Year | No. | % | No. | % | No. | % |
|---|---|---|---|---|---|---|
| 2025 | 4,982 | 39.72% | 7,526 | 60.01% | 34 | 0.27% |
| 2021 | 3,722 | 38.28% | 5,956 | 61.26% | 44 | 0.45% |
| 2017 | 2,872 | 37.60% | 4,671 | 61.15% | 95 | 1.24% |
| 2013 | 4,860 | 62.73% | 2,799 | 36.13% | 89 | 1.15% |
| 2009 | 4,863 | 49.26% | 4,386 | 44.42% | 624 | 6.32% |
| 2005 | 3,817 | 40.24% | 5,510 | 58.09% | 158 | 1.67% |

In the 2017 gubernatorial election, Democrat Phil Murphy received 61.2% of the vote (4,671 cast), ahead of Republican Kim Guadagno with 37.6% (2,872 votes), and other candidates with 1.2% (95 votes), among the 7,722 ballots cast by the township's 22,280 registered voters (84 ballots were spoiled), for a turnout of 34.7%. In the 2013 gubernatorial election, Republican Chris Christie received 62.7% of the vote (4,860 cast), ahead of Democrat Barbara Buono with 36.1% (2,799 votes), and other candidates with 1.1% (89 votes), among the 7,905 ballots cast by the township's 21,260 registered voters (157 ballots were spoiled), for a turnout of 37.2%. In the 2009 gubernatorial election, Republican Chris Christie received 48.8% of the vote here (4,863 ballots cast), ahead of Democrat Jon Corzine with 44.0% (4,386 votes), Independent Chris Daggett with 5.7% (563 votes) and other candidates with 0.6% (61 votes), among the 9,961 ballots cast by the township's 20,405 registered voters, yielding a 48.8% turnout.

United States Senate election results for Livingston1
| Year | Republican | | Democratic | | Third party(ies) | |
| Year | No. | % | No. | % | No. | % |
|---|---|---|---|---|---|---|
| 2024 | 5,944 | 38.41% | 9,234 | 59.67% | 297 | 1.92% |
| 2018 | 4,194 | 40.56% | 5,940 | 57.45% | 205 | 1.98% |
| 2012 | 5,394 | 42.09% | 7,135 | 55.67% | 287 | 2.24% |
| 2006 | 4,105 | 41.98% | 5,571 | 56.97% | 102 | 1.04% |

United States Senate election results for Livingston2
| Year | Republican | | Democratic | | Third party(ies) | |
| Year | No. | % | No. | % | No. | % |
|---|---|---|---|---|---|---|
| 2020 | 6,366 | 35.87% | 11,233 | 63.30% | 147 | 0.83% |
| 2014 | 2,869 | 39.91% | 4,244 | 59.04% | 75 | 1.04% |
| 2013 | 2,063 | 37.71% | 3,380 | 61.79% | 27 | 0.49% |
| 2008 | 5,737 | 42.04% | 7,733 | 56.67% | 176 | 1.29% |

Livingston was the home of one of New Jersey's most prominent political families, the Keans. Robert Kean served in the U.S. House of Representatives from 1939 to 1958, when he ran for U.S. Senator; his son, Thomas Kean, who served in the New Jersey General Assembly from 1968 to 1978 (and as Assembly Speaker in 1972–1973, and Minority Leader 1974–1977), as Governor of New Jersey from 1982 to 1990, and as President of Drew University from 1990 to 2004. Thomas Kean Jr., elected to the State Assembly in 2001 and the State Senate in 2003, was the Republican nominee for United States Senator in 2006.

When Robert Kean ran for the Senate, losing to Harrison A. Williams in 1958, Livingston's Congressman became George M. Wallhauser, a Republican. In redistricting after the 1960 census, Livingston was moved into the district of Republican Congresswoman Florence P. Dwyer. After redistricting following the 1970 census, Livingston went into Congressman Peter Frelinghuysen Jr.'s district. He was the father of Livingston's Congressman until 2019 Rodney P. Frelinghuysen. When Peter Frelinghuysen retired in 1974, he was succeeded by Millicent Fenwick, who beat Tom Kean in a Republican primary by about 80 votes. After the 1980 census, Livingston was moved to Congressman Joseph G. Minish's district. Minish was defeated by Dean Gallo in 1984 and served until his death in 1994. Rodney Frelinghuysen took his seat. The 2000 Census split the town between the 8th and 11th districts; as of the 2010 Census, the entire township is in the 11th district.

== Education ==
=== Public schools ===
The Livingston Public Schools serves students in pre-kindergarten through twelfth grade. The district consists of six elementary schools, grades Pre-K/K–5; one middle school for grade 6 and another middle school for grades 7 and 8, and one four-year high school. As of the 2019–20 school year, the district, comprised nine schools, had an enrollment of 6,151 students and 500.6 classroom teachers (on an FTE basis), for a student–teacher ratio of 12.3:1. Schools in the district (with 2019–20 enrollment data from the National Center for Education Statistics) are Burnet Hill Elementary School (488 students in grades Pre-K–5), Collins Elementary School (462; K–5), Amos W. Harrison Elementary School (449; K–5), Hillside Elementary School (397; K–5), Mount Pleasant Elementary School (434; K–5), Riker Hill Elementary School (400; K–5), Mount Pleasant Middle School (507; Grade 6), Heritage Middle School (1,008; 7–8) and Livingston High School (1,945; 9–12).

For the 1997–98 school year, Livingston High School received the National Blue Ribbon Schools Award from the United States Department of Education, one of the highest honors that an American school can achieve. Livingston High School was ranked 24th in New Jersey in New Jersey Monthly's 2012 rankings, 9th in New Jersey high schools in Newsweek's 2013 rankings of "America's Best High Schools", and is ranked 605th in US News' 2020 national high school rankings.

Approximately 26.7% of the township's population 25 years and older have attained professional, Masters or Doctorate degrees. During 2007–2008 budget year, Livingston allocated 59.96% of local property tax toward the Livingston Public Schools. Additionally, a separate budget of 7% of all municipal services went toward the operation of its public library. According to library statistics collected by Institute of Museum and Library Services, Livingston Public Library was ranked 22 out of 232 municipal libraries in New Jersey based on total circulation in 2006.

=== Private schools ===
Founded as Saint Philomena School in 1952 and renamed in 1987, Aquinas Academy was a private coeducational Roman Catholic school that served students from preschool through eighth grade and operates under the auspices of the Roman Catholic Archdiocese of Newark.On June 13, 2025, the school permanently closed.

Joseph Kushner Hebrew Academy is a private coeducational Jewish day school that serves preschool through eighth grade, while Rae Kushner Yeshiva High School is a four-year yeshiva high school for grades 9–12. The Tzedek School is a non-sectarian co-educational school of Jewish Heritage and Hebrew Language serving the communities of Livingston and the surrounding area for students in grades K–12.

Newark Academy is a private coeducational day school founded in 1774, that serves grades 6–8 in its middle schools and 9–12 in the upper school.

Livingston Chinese School and Livingston Huaxia Chinese School are two weekend Chinese-language schools in Livingston which use facilities of Heritage Middle School and Mount Pleasant school.

== Historic sites ==
The Ward–Force House and Condit Family Cook House are two building structures located at 366 South Livingston Avenue. These structures were jointly registered in the National Register of Historic Places in 1981, commonly known as the Old Force Homestead. Originally, Ward-Force House and Condit Family Cook House were built in separate properties. Ward-Force House was built as early as 1745 by Theophilus Ward. It was later purchased by Samuel Force for his son, Thomas Force. During the Revolutionary War, Thomas served as a patriot and was captured by the British. Thomas came back to live with his wife and children after the war and expanded the house. It was sold to the township in 1962. The Condit Family Cook House was built as a stand-alone summer kitchen of a farm home near the current location of Livingston Mall. When the mall was built during the 1970s, the Cook House was donated to the township and was moved to the current location at the rear of Ward-Force House. Currently, the Old Force Homestead is the headquarters of Livingston Historical Society and the Force Homestead Museum.

Dickinson House and Washington Place Schoolhouse are two other sites in the township that are registered in the New Jersey State Historic Site Program. Dickinson House is located at 84 Dickinson Lane. It was once visited by U.S. President Theodore Roosevelt for a hunting trip. Washington Place Schoolhouse is located at 122 Passaic Avenue. It was a school house that was built around 1800.

== Transportation ==
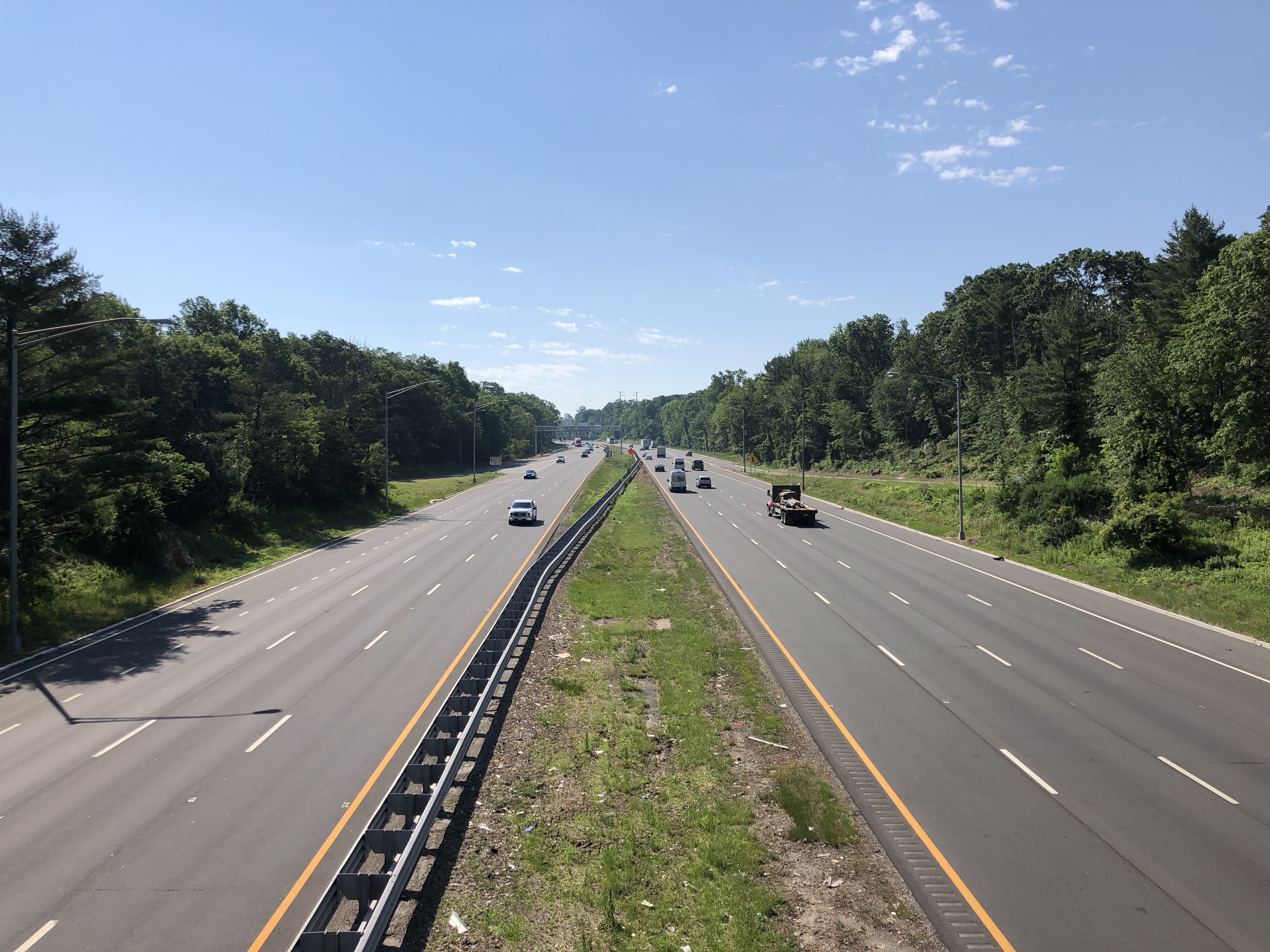
Interstate 280 eastbound in Livingston

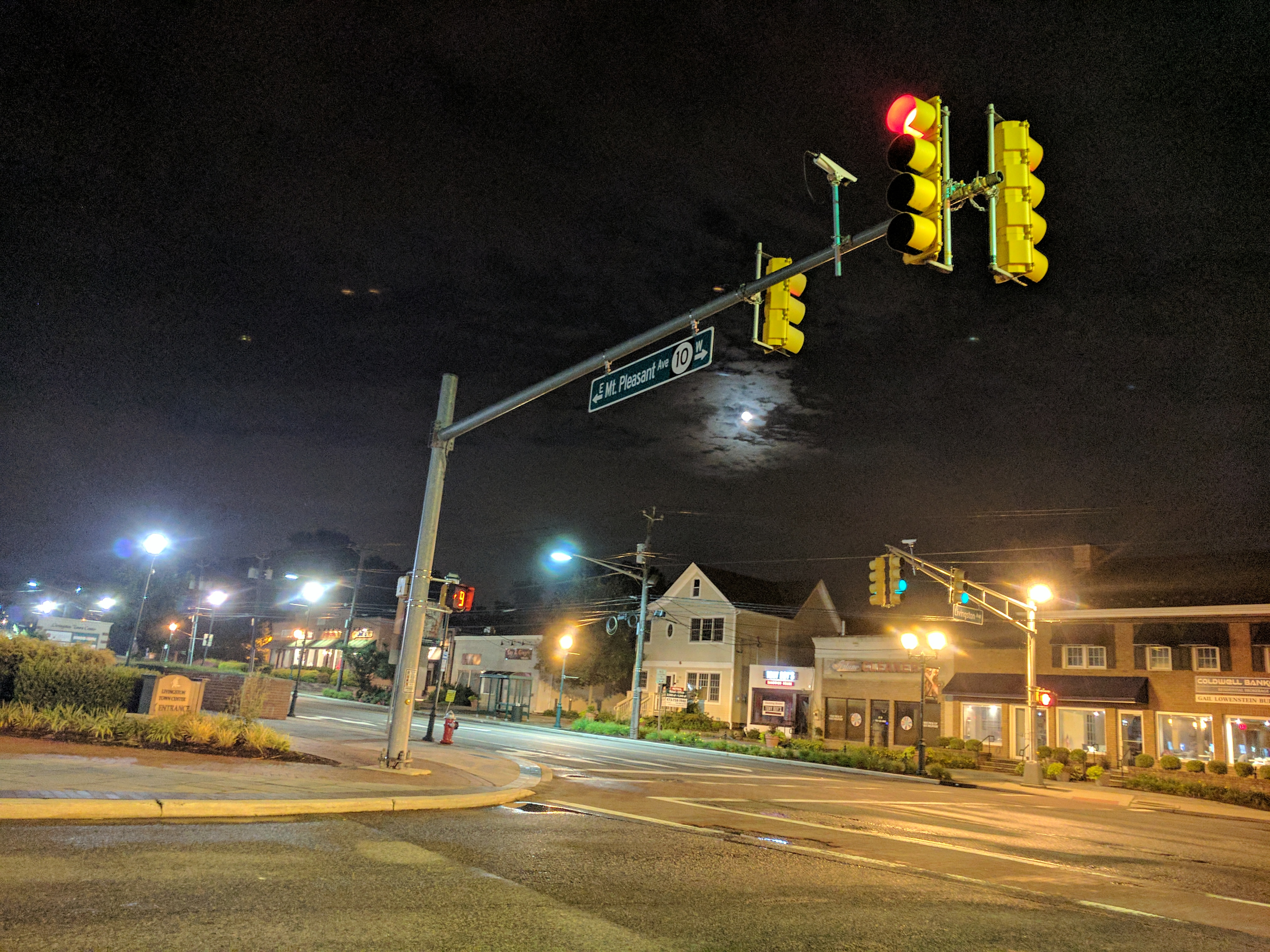
The intersection of Livingston Avenue and Route 10 at night

=== Roads and highways ===
As of 2010, The township had a total of 136.05 miles (218.95 km) of roadways, of which 105.43 miles (169.67 km) are maintained by the municipality, 26.05 miles (41.92 km) by Essex County and 4.57 miles (7.35 km) by the New Jersey Department of Transportation.

Livingston is located 21.9 miles (35.2 km) from New York City. Roads directly serving Livingston include Eisenhower Parkway (County Route 609), CR508, CR 527, CR 607, County Route 608, CR 634, CR 635, CR 649, CR 661, I-280 and Route 10. I-80, the Garden State Parkway and the New Jersey Turnpike (I-95) are all accessible via I-280.

=== Public transportation ===
Bus service to the Port Authority Bus Terminal is available on the Community Coach #77 bus route. OurBus company also operates a commuter route to New York City serving Livingston and West Orange. NJ Transit offers bus service to Newark on the 70, 71 and 73 routes, with local service available on the 873 route.

Rail service is accessible via the NJ Transit Morristown Line, which has several stops in adjacent communities such as Short Hills, Millburn, and South Orange. The stations are about 5 to 7 miles (8.0 to 11.3 km) from most of Livingston, accessible by car or taxi. The township provides a fee-based direct shuttle service called Livingston Express Shuttle for a 15-minute ride between Livingston Mall and South Orange Station for Morristown Line trains to New York Penn Station and Hoboken.

Amtrak's Northeast Corridor, for inter-city rail transit in the Northeastern United States, and the Port Authority's PATH service local rapid transit system are available 10 miles away at Newark Penn Station.

== Notable events ==
- On May 22, 1992, Democratic Presidential candidate and eventual Presidential elect Bill Clinton visited Livingston High School on a campaign stop to announce his support for Governor James Florio's NJ welfare proposal.
- On June 18, 1996, the Olympic Torch made a stop in Livingston while en route to Atlanta, Georgia.
- On November 16, 1999, Livingston High School hosted sitting Governor Christine Todd Whitman and her cabinet for a town hall meeting with a conversation focusing on the state's diversity.
- On January 13, 2008, Livingston High School hosted a crowd of 900 at the first of New Jersey Governor Jon Corzine's all-state county forum tour of Jersey to promote and explain his new toll hike proposal to finance state road maintenance. The town hall meeting featured a PowerPoint by Corzine and then a Q and A session where many attendees inquired about a new school financing proposal more so than the toll issue.
- On June 30, 2015, Chris Christie launched his campaign for the 2016 Republican presidential nomination at Livingston High School.

== Notable people ==
People who were born in, residents of, or otherwise closely associated with Livingston include:

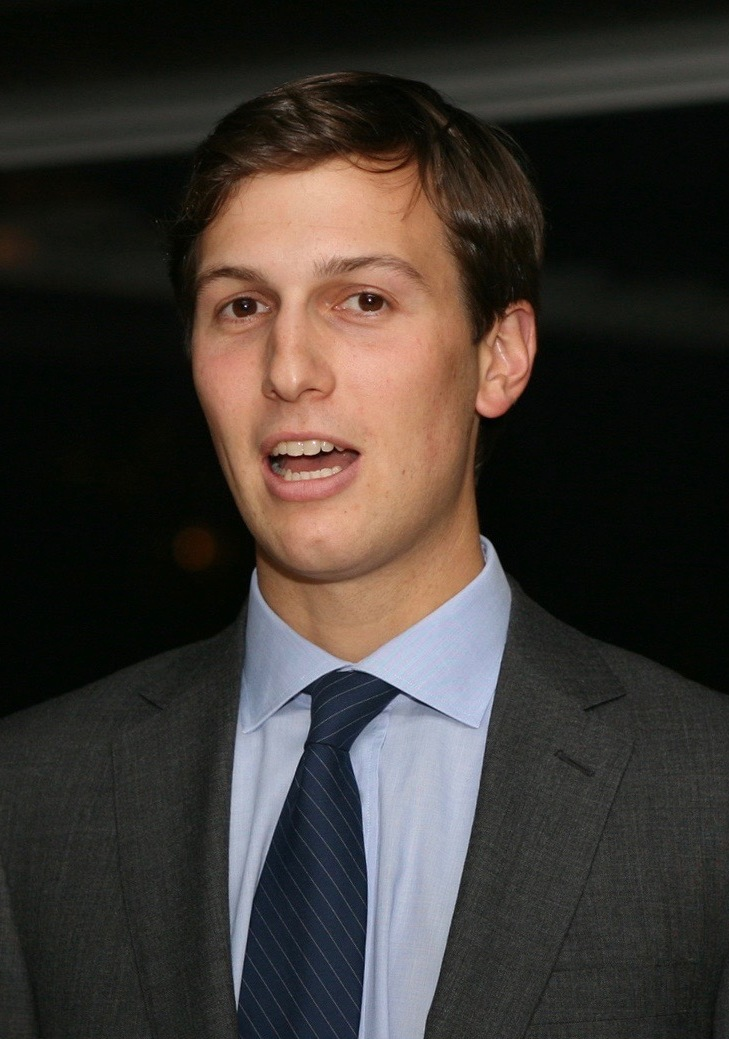
Jared Kushner

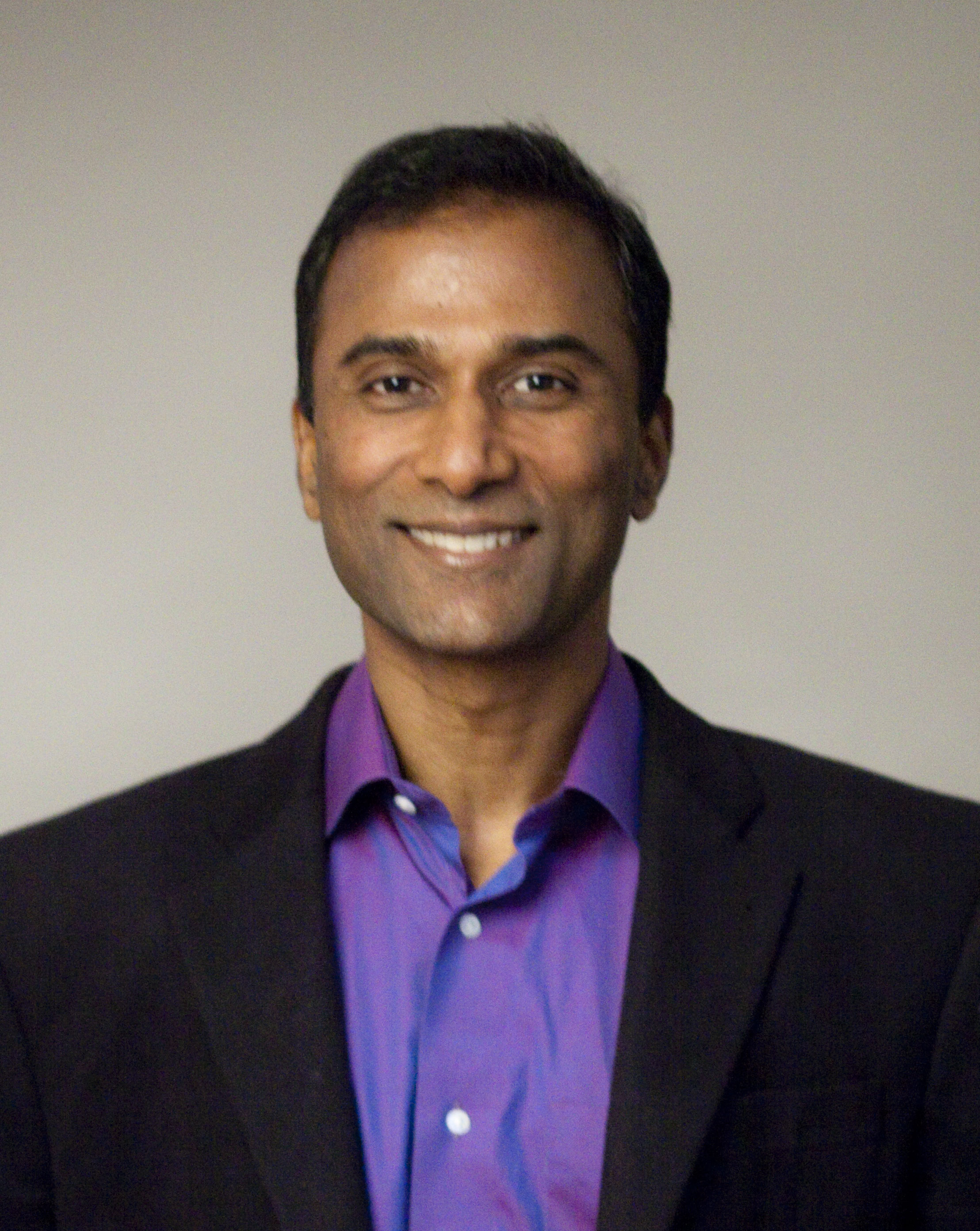
Shiva Ayyadurai

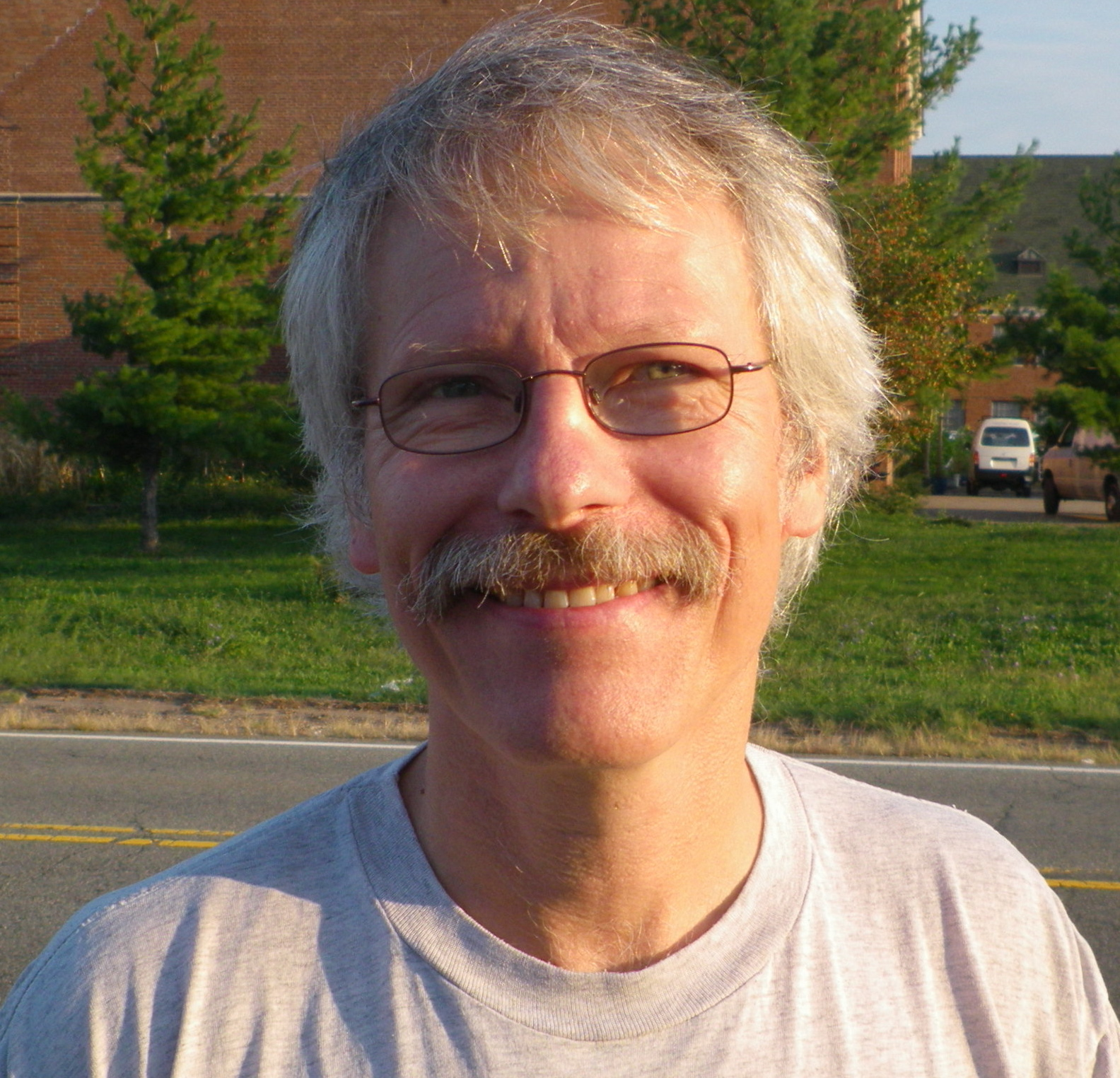
Paul E. Olsen

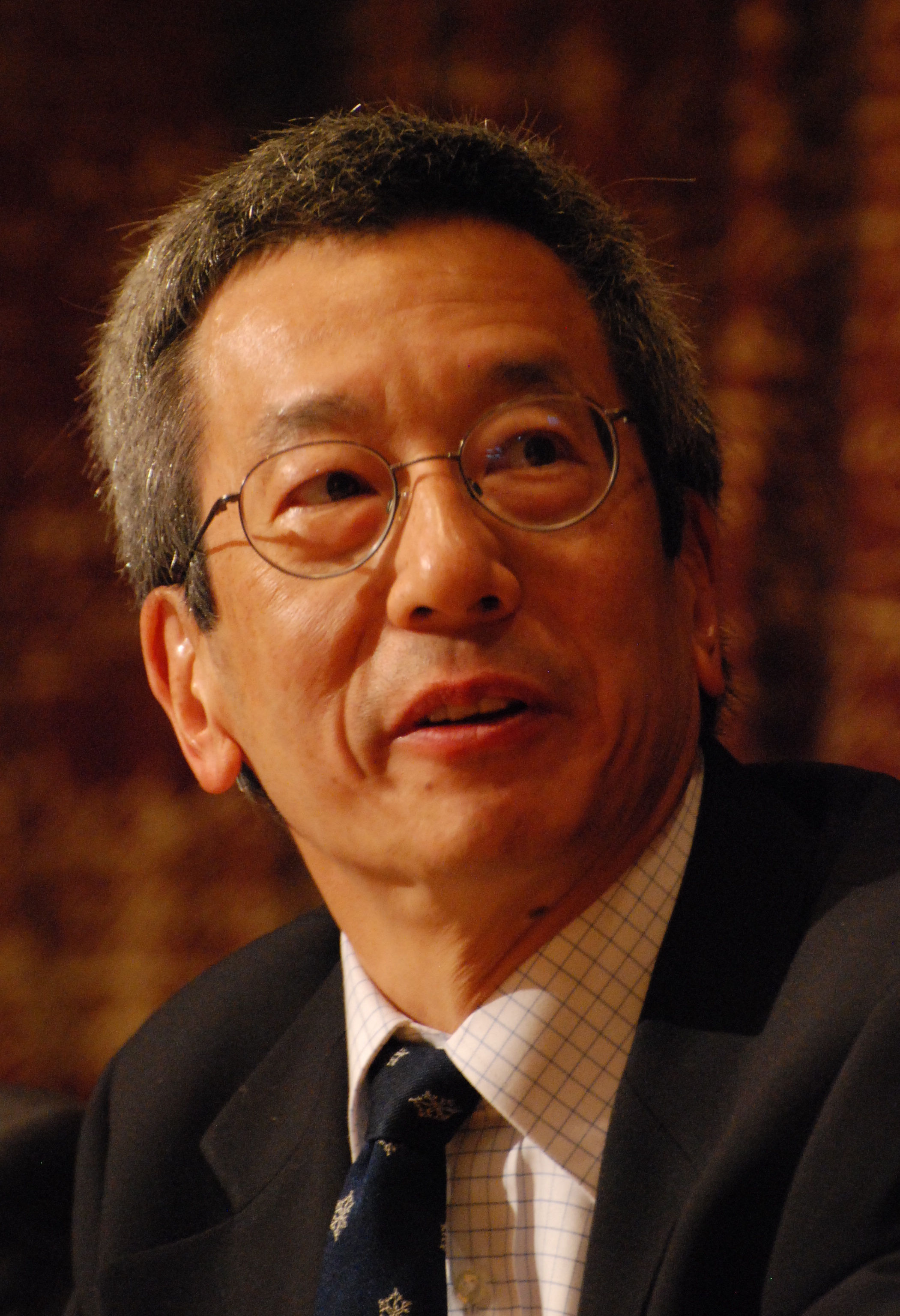
Roger Tsien

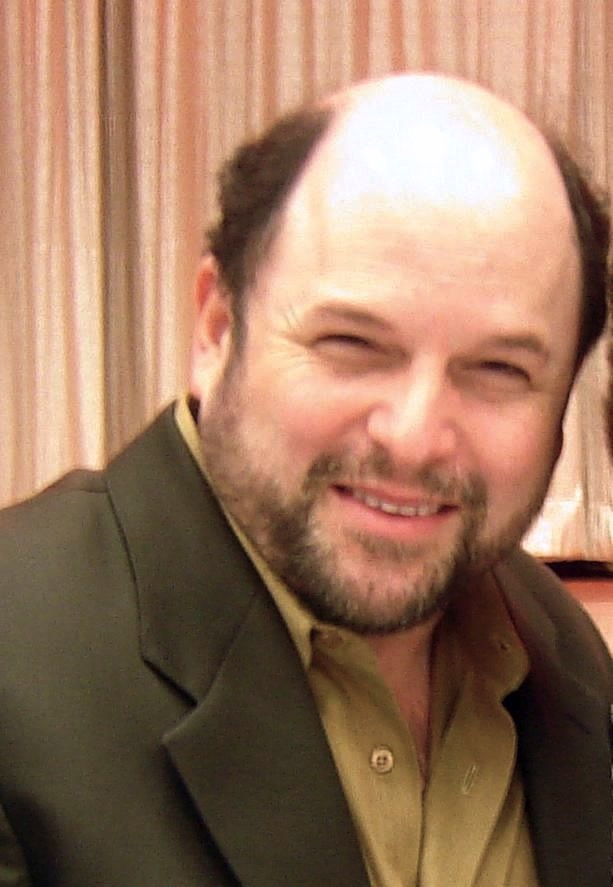
Jason Alexander

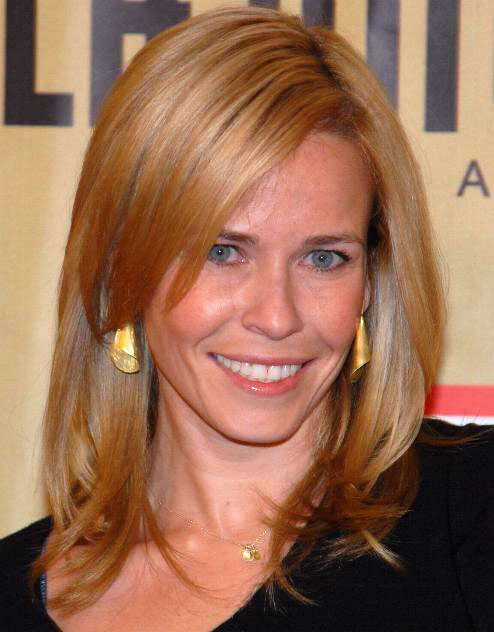
Chelsea Handler

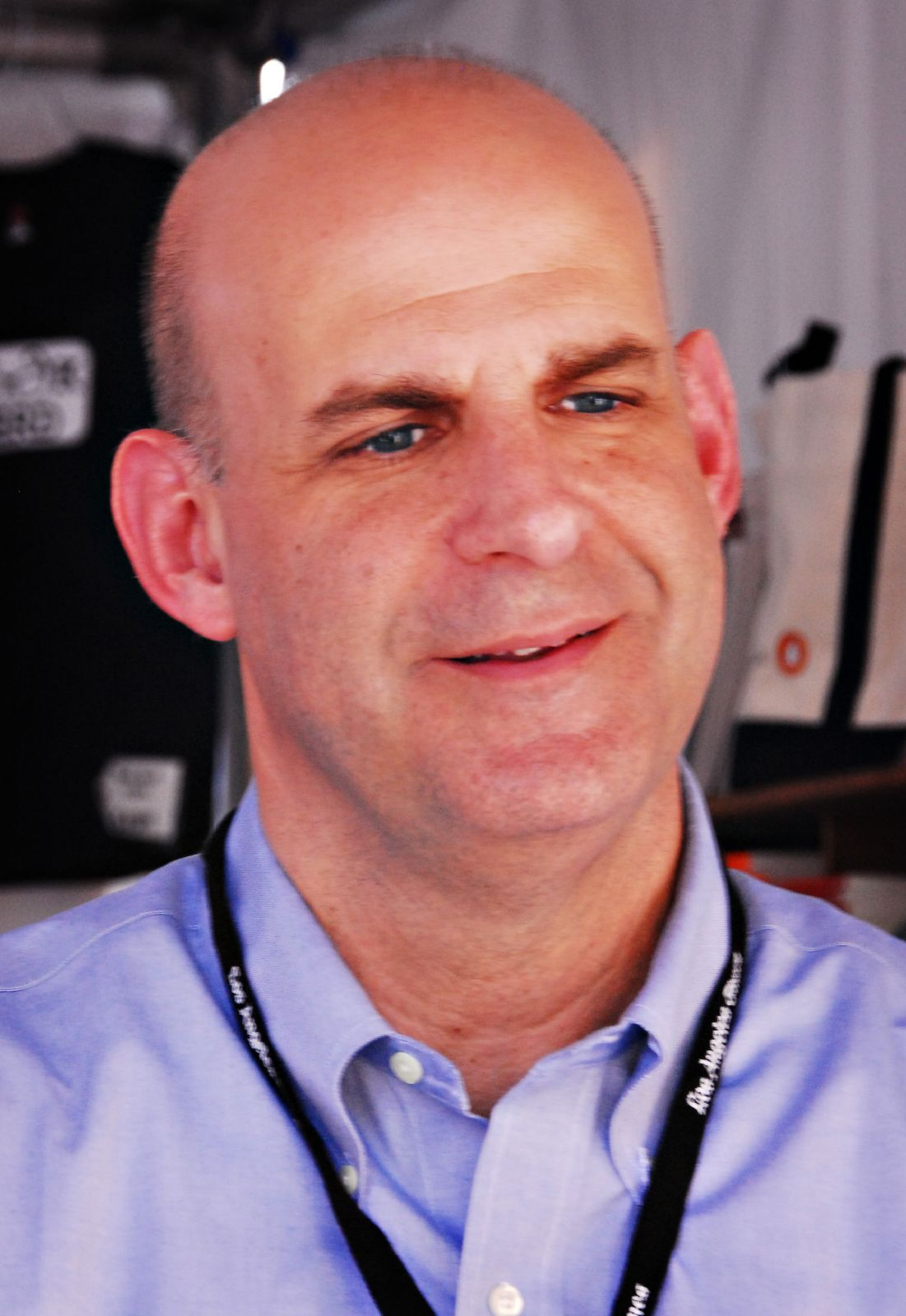
Harlan Coben

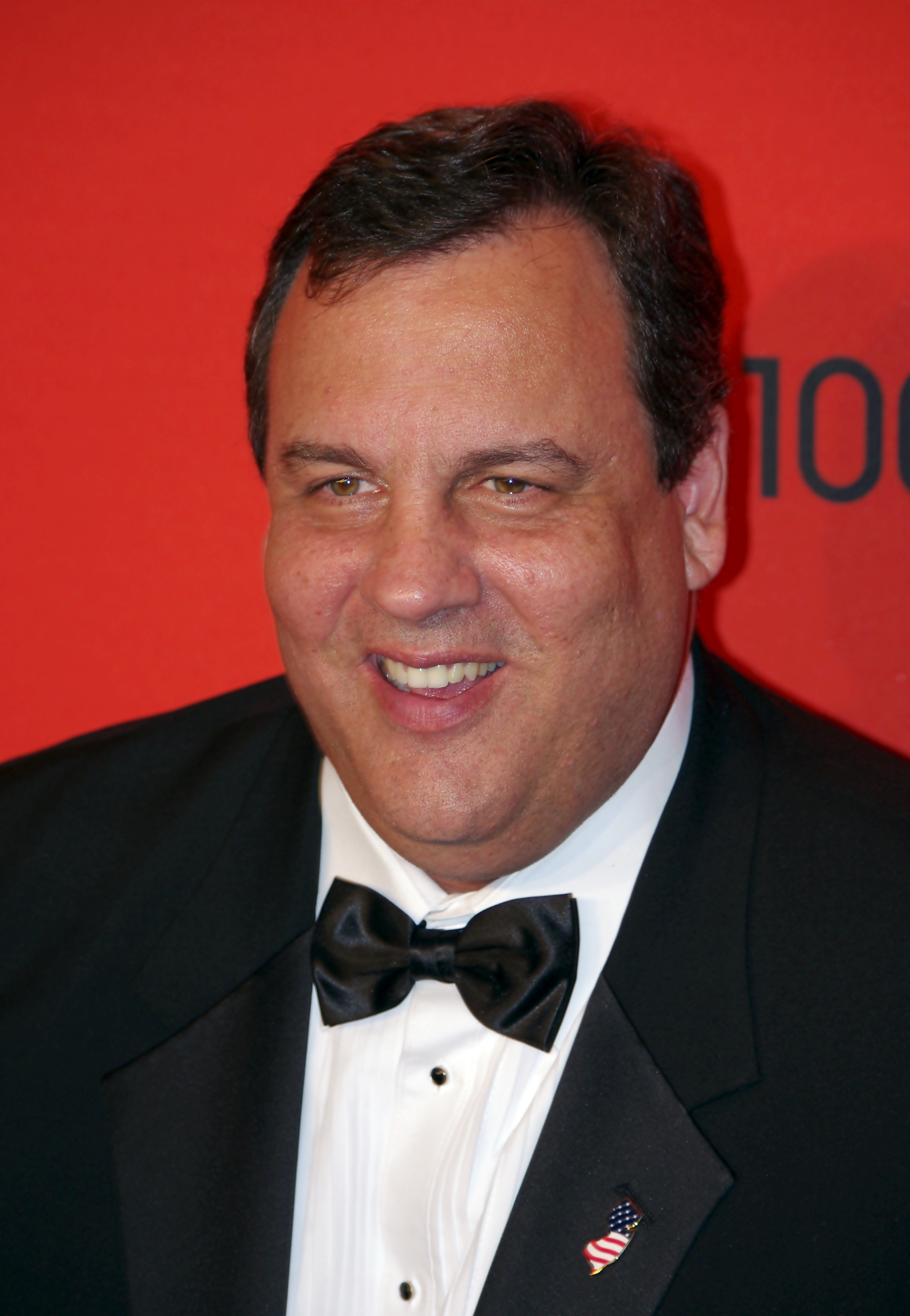
Chris Christie

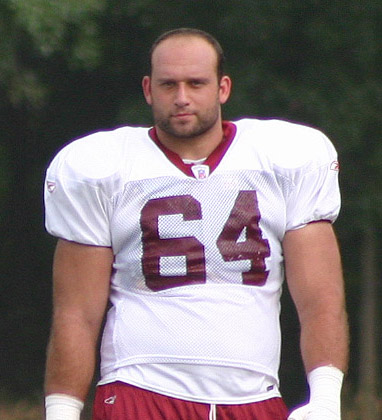
Lennie Friedman

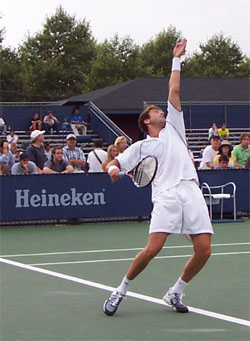
Justin Gimelstob

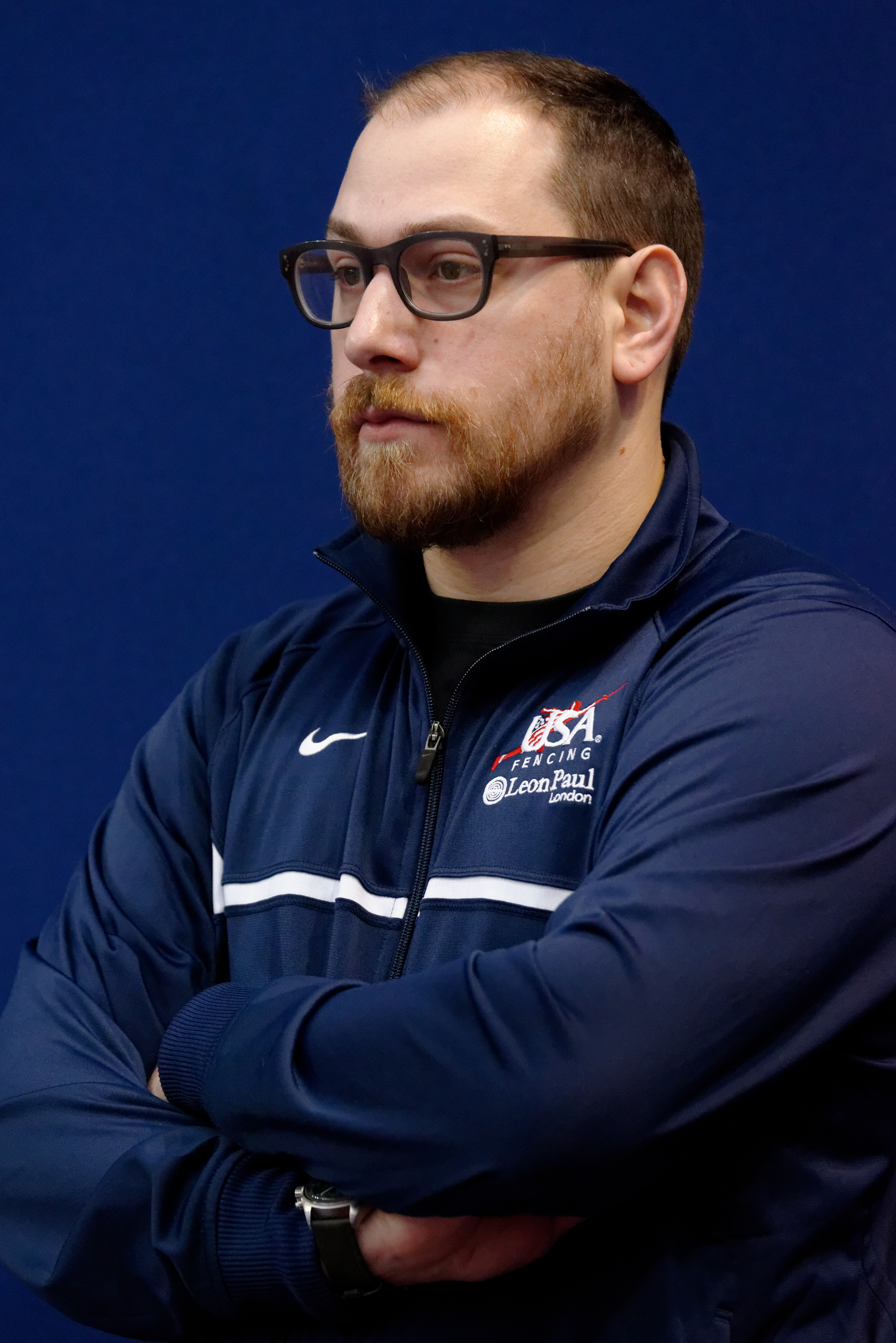
Dan Kellner

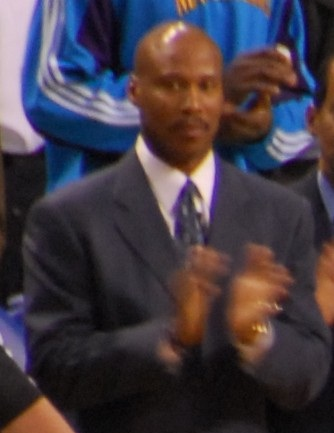
Byron Scott

=== Academia ===
- Shiva Ayyadurai (born 1963), MIT systems scientist and entrepreneur who controversially claims to have developed email in 1979 when he was a student at Livingston High School
- Denise J. Jamieson (born c. 1965), gynecologist who is the James Robert McCord Chair in Gynecology and Obstetrics at Emory University and former medical officer in the United States Public Health Service
- Pamela Nadell (born 1951), historian, researcher, author and lecturer focusing on Jewish history
- Paul E. Olsen (born 1953), paleontologist, elected to the United States National Academy of Sciences, helped in getting Riker Hill Fossil Site in Roseland registered as a National Natural Landmark when he was a teenager
- Suzanne Steinbaum (born c. 1968), cardiologist and director of Women's Heart Health at the Heart and Vascular Institute at Lenox Hill Hospital
- Roger Y. Tsien (1952–2016), chemist who was awarded the 2008 Nobel Prize in Chemistry He also won first prize in the Westinghouse talent search at age 16 when he attended Livingston High School with a project investigating how metals bind to thiocyanate

=== Artists ===
- Val Britton (born 1977), artist known for her collage work

=== Business ===
- Elvina Beck (born 1985), founder of the co-living company PodShare
- Frank Biondi (1945–2019), former president and CEO of Viacom, and former chairman and CEO of Universal Studios
- Robert E. Grady (born 1959), venture capitalist, investment banker and government official
- Barry Halper (1939–2005), baseball memorabilia collector and businessman, who was once a limited partner in the Yankees' ownership with George Steinbrenner
- Charles Kushner (born 1954), real estate mogul and Democratic fundraiser who pleaded guilty in 2004 to tax violations and charges related to witness tampering
- Joshua Kushner (born 1985), businessman and investor
- David Tepper (born 1957), founder of the hedge fund Appaloosa Management

=== Entertainment ===
- Jason Alexander (born 1959, originally Jay Greenspan), actor best known for his role as George Costanza of the long-running television show, Seinfeld
- Benjamin August (born c. 1979), casting director and screenwriter
- Bruce Beck (born 1956), sportscaster on WNBC
- Bobbi Kristina Brown (1993–2015), daughter of 6-time Grammy winning pop/R&B singer/actress Whitney Houston, reality television personality, media personality, and singer
- Alan Cooper (born c. 1949), founding member of Sha-Na-Na and biblical scholar
- Joe Dante (born 1946), film director whose work includes Gremlins, The Howling and Twilight Zone: The Movie
- Wally Feresten (born 1965/66), cue card handler and supervisor known for his work on Saturday Night Live
- Rob Fusari (born c. 1968), music producer and songwriter who discovered Lady Gaga
- Dana Gaier (born 1997), actress and singer-songwriter known for her role as "Edith" in the Despicable Me franchise
- Gary Ginstling, music executive who serves as the executive director of the New York Philharmonic
- Rachel Grae (born 2002), pop artist, singer and songwriter
- Chelsea Handler (born 1975), stand-up comedian, author, television personality and star of Chelsea Lately on E!
- Nikki M. James (born 1981), Tony-Award-winning actress and singer who won a 2011 Tony Award for Best Featured Actress in a musical for her role as Nabulungi in The Book of Mormon
- Jeff Janiak (born 1976), vocalist of the punk rock band Discharge
- Myq Kaplan (born 1978), comedian
- Leslie Kritzer (born 1977), Broadway actress in Legally Blonde: The Musical, The Great American Trailer Park Musical, and A Catered Affair with Harvey Fierstein
- Sophia Lin, film producer
- MIKE (born 1998), rapper, songwriter and record producer
- Stephen Oremus (born 1971), music supervisor, music director, orchestrator and vocal arranger who won a 2011 Tony Award for Orchestration for The Book of Mormon
- Ralph Pagano (born 1968), chef, restaurateur and television personality
- Adam Pally (born 1982), comedian and actor who appears in the ABC series Happy Endings
- Todd Solondz (born 1959), director, whose films include Welcome to the Dollhouse, Happiness and Life During Wartime
- Richard Tanne (born 1985), filmmaker who wrote and directed Southside With You and Chemical Hearts
- Thea White (born 1953), voice actress, best known for her role as Muriel in Courage the Cowardly Dog
- Wendy Williams (born 1964), radio personality, television host, actress, producer, author and comedian who has been host of The Wendy Williams Show
- Danny Zuker (born 1963), Emmy award-winning writer and producer for Modern Family

=== Literature ===
- Mona Charen (born 1957), conservative political columnist who grew up in Livingston, where she was close friends with future Washington Post journalist Ruth Marcus
- Harlan Coben (born 1962), The New York Times best-selling author of Promise Me, Tell No One and No Second Chance
- Susie Fishbein (born 1968), author of the best-selling Kosher By Design kosher cookbook series published by ArtScroll
- Ariel Horn (born c. 1979), novelist and teacher
- Jack Ketchum (pseudonym of Dallas Mayr, 1946–2018), author of The Girl Next Door and Off Season, who is a five-time winner of the Bram Stoker Award for Fiction
- Ruth Marcus (born 1958), liberal op-ed columnist for The Washington Post who grew up in Livingston, where she was close friends with future political (and politically-opposite) columnist Mona Charen
- Wendy Mass (born 1967), author of books for children, including A Mango-Shaped Space

=== Government, politics, and military ===
- Hannah August, press secretary for the First Lady Michelle Obama
- Rosy Bagolie, school administrator and politician who has represented the 27th legislative district in the New Jersey General Assembly since January 2024
- Steven C. Bondy, diplomat who has served as United States Ambassador to Bahrain since 2022
- Brendan Byrne (1924–2018), former Governor of New Jersey and Essex County Prosecutor, lived and died in Livingston
- Megan Coyne, political communications specialist who served as the White House Deputy Director of Platforms, where she managed the Twitter account for the White House
- Chris Christie (born 1962), Governor of New Jersey, a former United States Attorney for the United States District Court for the District of New Jersey who served on the Morris County Board of Chosen Freeholders
- Lucille Davy, former Commissioner of the New Jersey Department of Education and a graduate of Livingston High School
- Josh Gottheimer (born 1975), U.S. representative for New Jersey
- Christine Grady (born 1952), nurse and bioethicist who serves as the head of the Department of Bioethics at the National Institutes of Health Clinical Center
- Deborah Gramiccioni, lawyer who served as deputy executive director of the Port Authority of New York and New Jersey
- Nathan L. Jacobs (1905–1989), Justice of the New Jersey Supreme Court in 1948 and from 1952 to 1975
- The Keans: Hamilton Fish Kean (1862–1941, Congress 1929–1935), Robert Kean (1893–1980, Congress 1939–1950), Thomas Kean (Assembly 1968–1978, Speaker 1971–1972, Governor, 1982–1990) and Tom Kean Jr. (Assemblyman 2001–2003; State Senate 2003-2022; 2006 G.O.P. failed nominee for U.S. Senate)
- Robert Kirsch (born 1966), lawyer who serves as a United States district judge of the United States District Court for the District of New Jersey
- Alan B. Krueger (born 1960), economist nominated to serve on the Council of Economic Advisers
- Jared Kushner (born 1981), senior presidential adviser to Donald Trump
- Glenn K. Rieth (born 1957), who was the Adjutant General of New Jersey in Governor Jon Corzine's cabinet
- Michael Schlossberg (born 1983), member of the Pennsylvania House of Representatives, who has represented the 132nd district since 2013
- Mike Weinstein (born 1949), member of the Florida House of Representatives
- Nina Mitchell Wells, former Secretary of State of New Jersey Her husband, Ted Wells, is a prominent criminal attorney
- David Wildstein (born 1961), former mayor of Livingston and central figure in the Bridgegate scandal

=== Sports ===
- Jozy Altidore (born 1989), striker for the USA Senior Men's Soccer Team who plays for Toronto F.C.
- Tashawn Bower (born 1995), defensive end for the Minnesota Vikings of the National Football League (NFL). He played college football at LSU
- Joan Brody, World Champion bridge player who won the Women's Team event in Wrocław in 2022
- Mike Chernoff (born c. 1981), baseball General Manager for the Cleveland Indians
- Hazel Clark (born 1977), runner who represented the US at the Summer Olympics in 2000, 2004 and 2008 competing in the 800 meters event
- Chris Corbo (born 2004), college football tight end for the Georgia Tech Yellow Jackets
- Tom Courtney (1933–2023), athlete and winner of two gold medals in the 1956 Summer Olympics
- Andrea Davidovich (born 1997), figure skater who represented Israel in the 2014 Winter Olympics
- Tommy DeVito (born 1998), quarterback for the New York Giants
- Boubacar Diallo (born 2002), soccer player who plays as a midfielder for FC Tulsa in the USL Championship
- Bob Dukiet (1948–2009), college basketball coach
- Monica Flores (born 1996), American-born Mexican footballer who plays as a left back for Notre Dame Fighting Irish and for the Mexico women's national team
- Sabrina Flores (born 1996), American-born Mexican footballer who plays as a midfielder for Spanish Primera División club Sevilla FC and was a member of the Mexico women's national team
- Lennie Friedman (born 1976), NFL offensive lineman
- Justin Gimelstob (born 1977), professional tennis player who won 13 doubles titles and reached 1 final in singles
- Jarryd Goldberg (born 1985), former professional soccer player who played for Miami FC
- Chris Jacobs (born 1964), swimming medalist at the 1988 Summer Olympics
- Brian Jamieson (born 1969), rower who won a silver medal at the 1996 Summer Olympics in the quad scull event
- Sheldon Karlin (1950–2000), distance runner who won the New York City Marathon in 1972
- Dan Kellner (born 1976), Olympic foil fencer
- Brandin Knight (born 1981), former professional basketball player
- Brevin Knight (born 1975), professional basketball player on the Charlotte Bobcats
- Connor Lade (born 1989), professional soccer player for the New York Red Bulls
- Brendan Mahon (born 1995), guard for the Carolina Panthers of the NFL
- Steve Nisenson, basketball player
- Larry Ogunjobi (born 1994), defensive tackle for the Cleveland Browns
- Deonna Purrazzo (born 1994), professional wrestler for World Wrestling Entertainment
- Claudio Reyna (born 1973), professional soccer player who played for European premier teams and was on the World Cup squad from 1994 until 2006
- Frank Schwindel (born 1992), first baseman for the Chicago Cubs
- Byron Scott (born 1961), lived here while he was coach of the New Jersey Nets
- Elizabeth Tartakovsky (born 2000), Olympic saber fencer
- David Tyree (born 1980), NFL wide receiver who played for the Super Bowl XLII champion New York Giants
- Stan Yagiello (born 1963), former professional football quarterback
- Richie Zisk (born 1949), outfielder and designated hitter who played for the Pittsburgh Pirates and other MLB teams

=== Others ===
- Ruggiero "Richie The Boot" Boiardo (1890–1984), alleged capo of the Genovese crime family and mafioso of Newark, New Jersey, in the early 1900s
