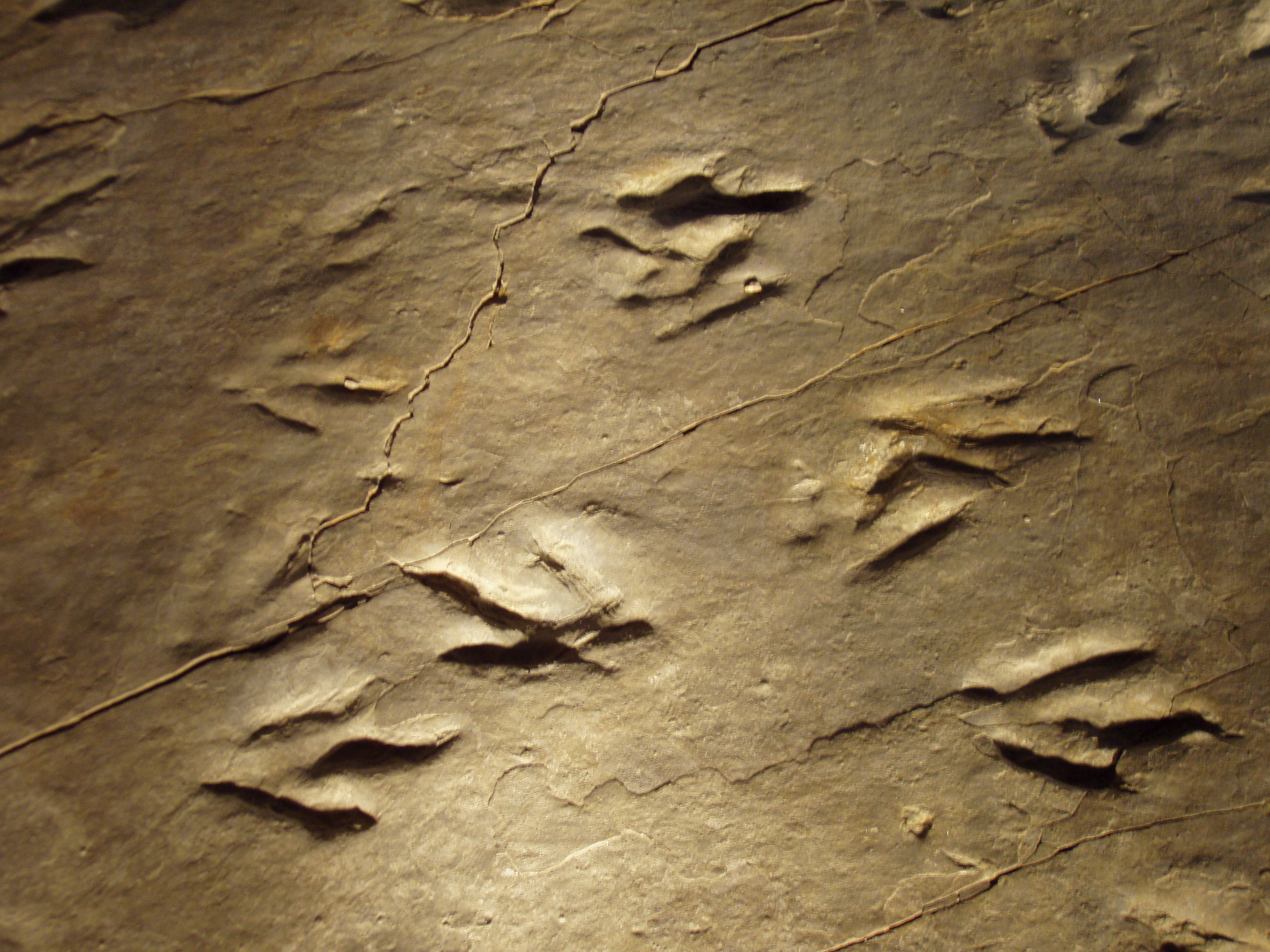

Trace fossil classification
- Ichnofamily: Eubrontidae
- Ichnogenus: Eubrontes; Hitchcock, 1845

Type ichnospecies
- †Eubrontes giganteus (Hitchcock, 1836)

Ichnospecies
- †Eubrontes approximatus (Hitchcock, 1865); †Eubrontes divaricatus (Hitchcock, 1865); †Eubrontes euskelosauroides Huene, 1932; †Eubrontes giganteus (Hitchcock, 1836); †Eubrontes nobitai Xing et al, 2020; †Eubrontes platypus Lull, 1904; †Eubrontes tatricus Michalik & Sýkora, 1976; †Eubrontes thianschanicum (Roman); †Eubrontes tuberatus (Hitchcock, 1858); †Eubrontes veillonensis Lapparent & Monetnat, 1967

= Eubrontes =

Fossilised dinosaur footprints

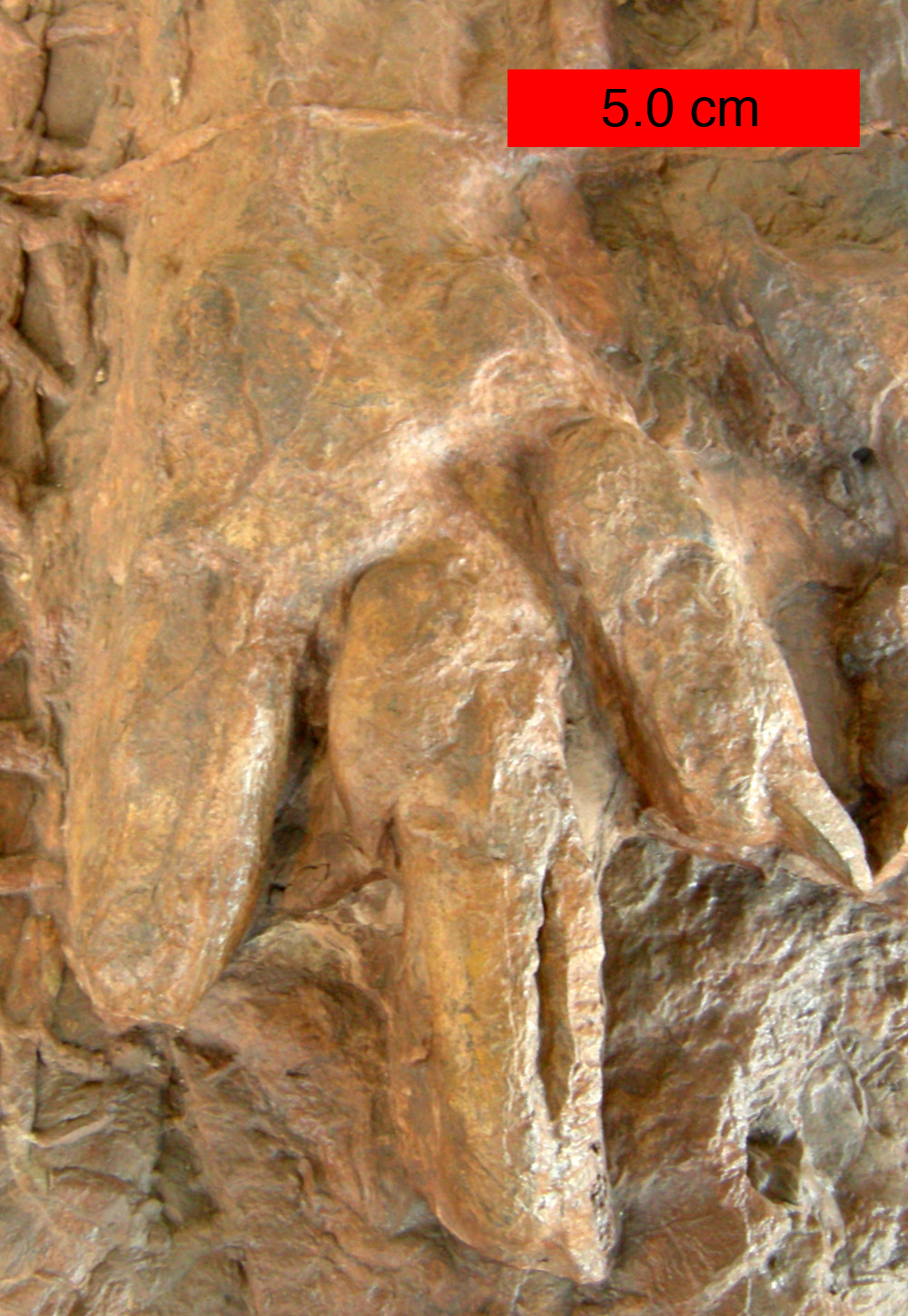
Eubrontes in the Lower Jurassic Moenave Formation at the St. George Dinosaur Discovery Site at Johnson Farm, southwestern Utah.

Eubrontes is the name of fossilised dinosaur footprints dating from the Late Triassic and Early Jurassic. They have been identified from France, Poland, Slovakia, Czech Republic, Italy, Spain, Sweden, Australia (Queensland), US, India, China and Brazil (South).

Eubrontes is the name of the footprints, identified by their shape, and not of the genus or genera that made them, which is as yet unknown but is presumed to be similar to Coelophysis or Dilophosaurus. They are most famous for their discovery in the Connecticut River Valley of Massachusetts in the early 19th century. They, among other footprints, were the first known non-avian dinosaur tracks to be discovered in North America, though they were initially thought to have been made by large birds.

== Discovery and identity ==
The footprints were first described by Edward Hitchcock, a professor of Amherst College, who thought they were made by a large bird. He originally assigned them to ichnotaxon Ornithichnites in 1836, then Ornithoidichnites in 1841, before coining Eubrontes in 1845. The name means "true thunder," probably referring to the supposed weight of the animal impacting on the ground.

in 1858 Hitchcock still described the tracks as those of "a thick-toed bird," since there was no evidence of tail drag marks. But by the time that Richard Swann Lull began working on the tracks in 1904, they were thought to belong to a dinosaur. Lull originally thought they were from a herbivore, but by 1953 he concluded they were from a carnivorous theropod. Many later authors have agreed with this interpretation, but some have suggested that they are from a prosauropod. Regardless, they are almost certainly saurischian.

A typical Eubrontes print is from 25–50 cm long, with three toes that terminate in sharp claws. It belongs to a biped that must have been over one metre high at the hip and from 5–6 metres long. In the 1960s Edwin Colbert and others supposed that a large heavy carnivore like Teratosaurus (then considered to be a dinosaur) made the track, but a possible candidate is Dilophosaurus, a large theropod related to Coelophysis, or a close relative such as Podokesaurus. However no Dilophosaurus fossil material is associated with Eubrontes tracks. The tracks may also be from a plateosaurid. In 2016 Molina-Perez and Larramendi based on the 45 cm (1.48 ft) long footprint estimated the size of the animal at 8.4 meters (27.5 ft) and 600 kg (1.323 lbs). Another 60.5 cm (1.98 ft) long footprint belongs to an 8.1 meter (26.6 ft), 1.1 tonne (2.425 lbs) individual, that was very similar to Sinosaurus triassicus.

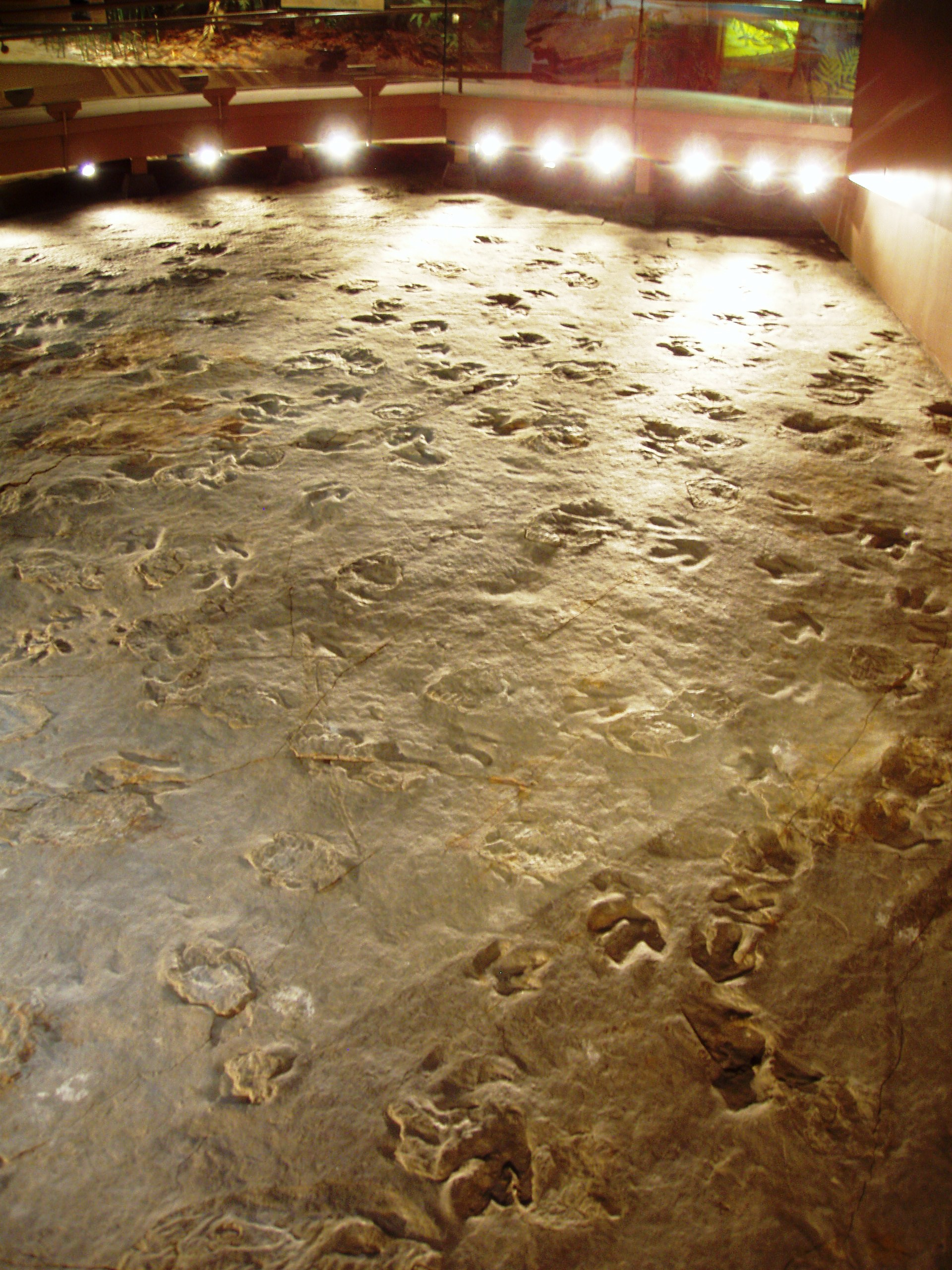
Eubrontes prints. Dinosaur State Park and Arboretum

Another major find occurred at Rocky Hill, Connecticut in 1966. Nearly 600 prints are preserved there in an area now designated Dinosaur State Park.

The paleontologist Robert E. Weems proposed in 2003 that Eubrontes tracks were not produced by a theropod, but by a sauropodomorph similar to Plateosaurus, excluding Dilophosaurus as a possible trackmaker. Instead, Weems proposed Kayentapus hopii, another ichnotaxon named by Welles in 1971, as the best match for Dilophosaurus. The attribution to Dilophosaurus was primarily based on the wide angle between digit impressions three and four shown by these tracks, and the observation that the foot of the holotype specimen shows a similarly splayed-out fourth digit. Also in 2003, paleontologist Emma Rainforth argued that the splay in the holotype foot was merely the result of distortion, and that Eubrontes would indeed be a good match for Dilophosaurus. The paleontologist Spencer G. Lucas and colleagues stated in 2006 that virtually universal agreement existed that Eubrontes tracks were made by a theropod like Dilophosaurus, and that they and other researchers dismissed Weems' claims.

In 2006, Weems defended his 2003 assessment of Eubrontes, and proposed an animal like Dilophosaurus as the possible trackmaker of numerous Kayentapus trackways of the Culpeper Quarry in Virginia. Weems suggested rounded impressions associated with some of these trackways to represent hand impressions lacking digit traces, which he interpreted as a trace of quadrupedal movement. Milner and colleagues used the new combination Kayentapus soltykovensis in 2009, and suggested that Dilophosauripus may not be distinct from Eubrontes and Kayentapus. They suggested that the long claw marks that were used to distinguish Dilophosauripus may be an artifact of dragging. They found that Gigandipus and Anchisauripus tracks may likewise also just represent variations of Eubrontes. They pointed out that differences between ichnotaxa may reflect how the trackmaker interacted with the substrate rather than taxonomy. They also found Dilophosaurus to be a suitable match for a Eubrontes trackway and resting trace (SGDS 18.T1) from the St. George dinosaur discovery site in the Moenave Formation of Utah, though the dinosaur itself is not known from the formation, which is slightly older than the Kayenta Formation.

Weems stated in 2019 that Eubrontes tracks do not reflect the gracile feet of Dilophosaurus, and argued they were instead made by the bipedal sauropodomorph Anchisaurus. In a 2024 review of Jurassic tracks, the paleontologist John R. Foster and colleagues stated that few other ichnologists had accepted Weems' sauropodomorph interpretation of Eubrontes, partially because such tracks are abundant in places where no sauropodomorph fossils have been found.

In 1975, two paleontologists in Tichá Dolina discovered several tracks originally named "Coelurosaurichnus Tatricus" and later it was renamed to Eubrontes Tatricus, because the original name was considered "invalid" but no evidence was given to support this claim i.e. one of the paleontologists who found it randomly decided to change the name. At the Slovak National Museum - Natural Museum, there is a life reconstruction of Eubrontes Tatricus.

== Paleopathology ==
A trackway attributed to the ichnogenus Eubrontes had a missing second digit on the right foot. The animal could have either lost the toe due to injury or it was malformed.

== In popular culture ==
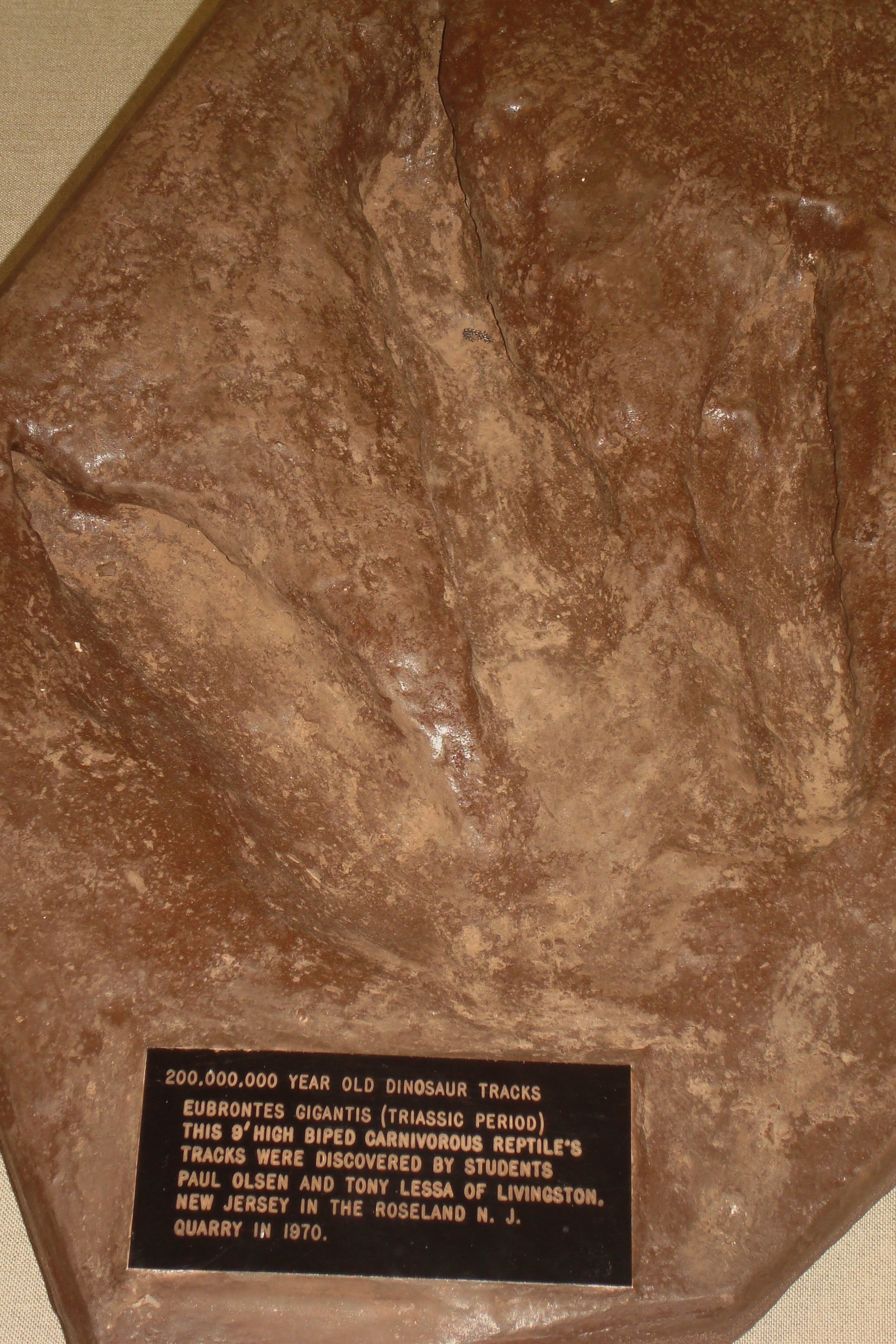
Cast of Eubrontes giganteus footprint by Paul Olsen

In early 1970s, a fiberglass cast of an Eubrontes giganteus footprint was made by Paul E. Olsen, then 14 years old, and his friend Tony Lessa. On June 29, 1972, it was sent by Olsen and Lessa to President Richard Nixon to get his support for registering the Riker Hill Fossil Site in Roseland, New Jersey as a National Natural Landmark.

In 1991, Eubrontes was named the state fossil of Connecticut.

An ichnospecies of dinosaur footprint from the Early Cretaceous of Gulin County, Sichuan, China was discovered and named as Eubrontes nobitai. The epithet of scientific name commemorate Nobita Nobi, a fictional character in the Doraemon series, for the movies Doraemon: Nobita's Dinosaur and Doraemon: Nobita's New Dinosaur, which have inspired children's love for dinosaurs.

== See also ==
- List of dinosaur ichnogenera
- Connecticut River Valley trackways
- List of Australian and Antarctic dinosaurs
- Grallator
- Anomoepus
- Dilophosaurus
- Edward Hitchcock
