= Ward–Force House and Condit Family Cook House =

Historic house in New Jersey, United States

- U.S. National Register of Historic Places
- New Jersey Register of Historic Places
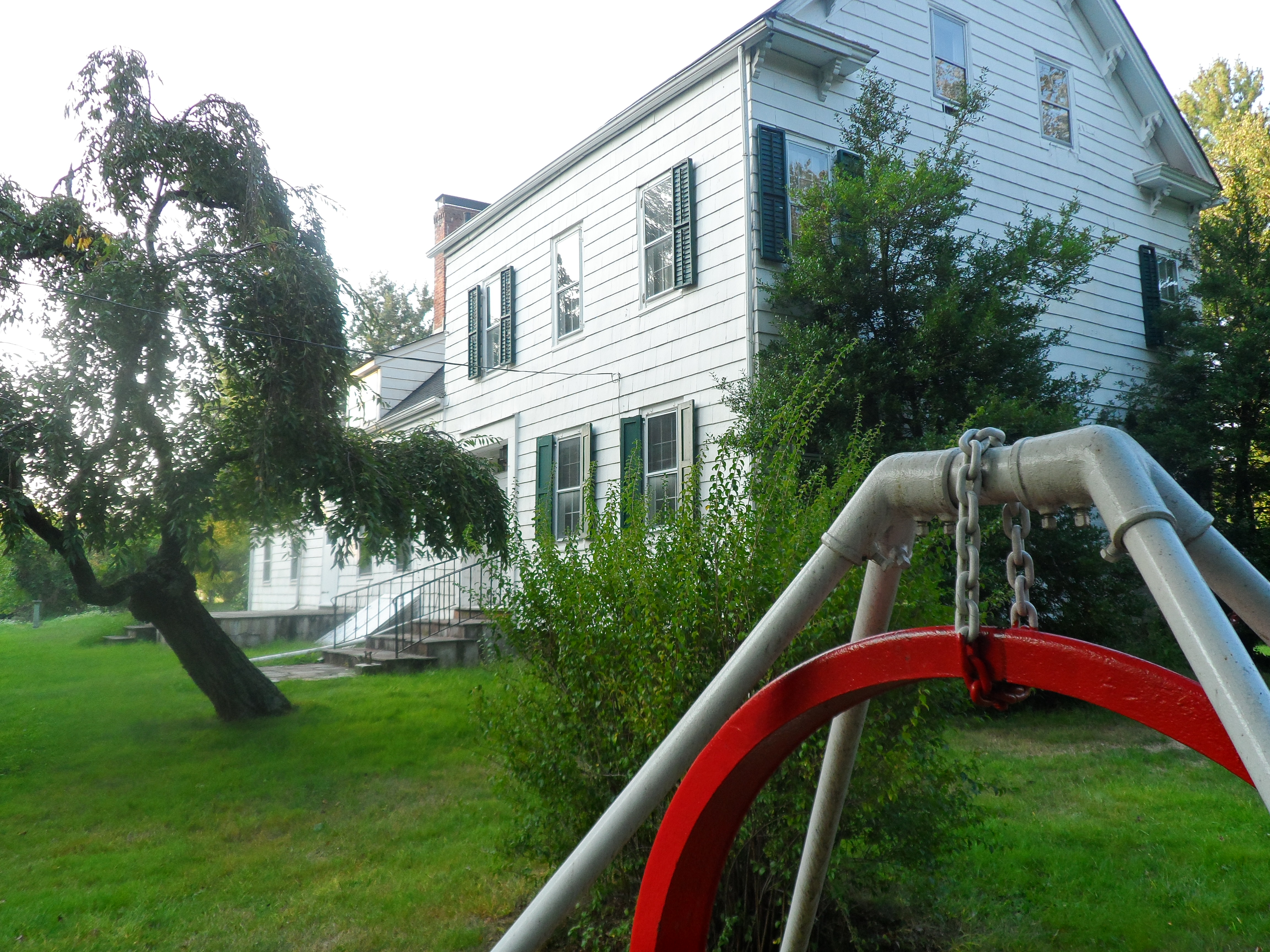

- Location within Essex County, New Jersey Location within New Jersey Location within the United States
- Location: 366 South Livingston Avenue, Livingston, New Jersey
- Coordinates: 40°46′54″N 74°19′0″W
- Area: 0.5 acres (0.20 ha)
- Built: 1745
- Architects: Ward, Theophilus
- NRHP reference No.: 81000391
- NJRHP No.: 1095

Significant dates
- Added to NRHP: December 29, 1981
- Designated NJRHP: November 12, 1981

Ward–Force House and Condit Family Cook House is located in Livingston, Essex County, New Jersey, United States. The house was built in 1745 and was added to the National Register of Historic Places on December 29, 1981.

== See also ==
- National Register of Historic Places listings in Essex County, New Jersey
