= Paul E. Olsen =

American paleontologist

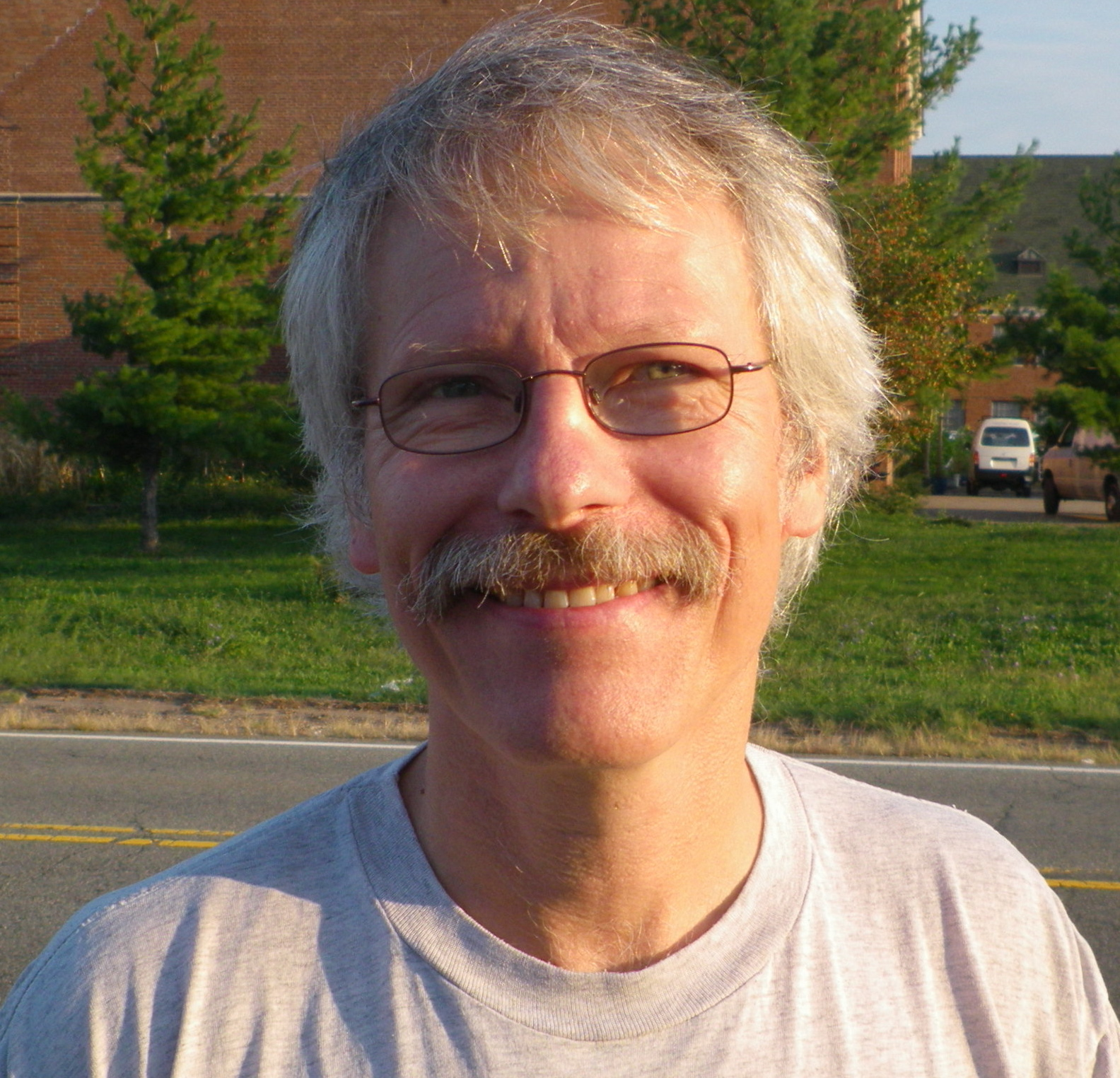
- Born: 4 August 1953 (age 73); New Jersey, USA
- Education: Yale University
- Known for: Newark Supergroup
- Scientific career
- Fields: paleontology, geology
- Workplaces: Lamont Doherty Earth Observatory

Paul E. Olsen (born August 4, 1953) is an American paleontologist and author and co-author of a large number of technical papers.

== Biography ==
As a teenager in Livingston, New Jersey, he helped get the Riker Hill Fossil Site named a National Natural Landmark by sending President Richard Nixon a dinosaur footprint cast from the site. He received a B.A. in Geology, M. Phil. and a Ph.D. in Biology at Yale University in 1984. His thesis was on the Newark Supergroup.

His interests and research examine patterns of ecosystem evolution and extinction as a response to climate change over geological time, and Triassic and Jurassic continental ecosystems. His research methods include paleoclimatology, structural geology, paleontology, palynology, geochemistry, and geophysics.

Olsen is the Arthur D. Storke Memorial Professor of Earth and Environmental Sciences, Department of Earth and Environmental Sciences, Lamont–Doherty Earth Observatory at Columbia University, and a Research Associate at the Carnegie Museum of Natural History, Pittsburgh, the American Museum of Natural History and the Virginia Natural History Museum, from which he received the Thomas Jefferson Medal for Outstanding Contributions to Natural Science in 2015. He was elected to the National Academy of Sciences in 2008.

Below is a list of taxa that Olsen has contributed to naming:

Year	Taxon	Authors
2008	Postosuchus alisonae sp. nov.	Peyer, Carter, Sues, Novak, & Olsen
2001	Hypuronector limnaios gen. et sp. nov.	Colbert & Olsen
1999	Plinthogomphodon herpetairus gen. et sp. nov.	Sues, Olsen, & Carter
1994	Clevosaurus bairdi sp. nov.	Sues, Shubin, & Olsen
1993	Xenodiphyodon petraios gen. et sp. nov.	Sues & Olsen
1993	Gomphiosauridion baileyae gen. et sp. nov.	Sues & Olsen

== Recent publications ==
- Olsen, Paul E.; Sha, Jingeng; Fang, Yanan; Chang, Clara; Whiteside, Jessica H.; Kinney, Sean; Sues, Hans-Dieter; Kent, Dennis; Schaller, Morgan; Vajda, Vivi (July 2022). "Arctic ice and the ecological rise of the dinosaurs". Science Advances. 8 (26) eabo6342. Bibcode:2022SciA....8O6342O. doi:10.1126/sciadv.abo6342. PMC 10883366. PMID 35776799. S2CID 250218588.
- Olsen, P.E., Laskar, J., Kent, D.V., Kinney, S.T., Reynolds, D.J., Sha, J., Whiteside, J.H., 2019, Mapping Solar System chaos with the Geological Orrery. PNAS, May 28, 2019 116 (22) 10664-10673.
- Peter LeTourneau and Paul Olsen (ed.), (2003) The Great Rift Valleys of Pangea in Eastern North America, vol. 1-2, published by Columbia University Press. Volume 1: Tectonics, Structure, and Volcanism (ISBN 0-231-11162-2), Volume 2: Sedimentology, Stratigraphy, and Paleontology (ISBN 0-231-12676-X)

== In production ==
- Olsen, Paul E., Dinosaur and Other Fossil Tracks of Eastern North America: Columbia University Press
