= Theropod paleopathology =

Theropod paleopathology is the study of injury and disease in theropod dinosaurs. In 2001, Ralph E. Molnar published a survey of pathologies in theropod dinosaur bone that uncovered pathological features in 21 genera from 10 theropod families. Pathologies have been seen on most theropod body parts, with the most common sites of preserved injury and disease being the ribs and tail vertebrae. The least common sites of preserved pathology are the weight-bearing bones like the tibia, femur and sacrum. Most pathologies preserved in theropod fossils are the remains of injuries, but infections and congenital deformities have also been documented. Pathologies are less frequently documented in small theropods, although this may simply be because the larger bones of correspondingly larger animals would be more likely to fossilize in the first place.

== Identification ==
Paleontologist Ralph Molnar has observed that genuine injuries and illnesses in theropod remains can be distinguished from scavenging traces because pathological bones should show signs of healing, while damage to a carcass after death would not. He also notes that the location of a potential pathology on the body can help determine whether the apparent injury was inflicted before or after death. He reasons that body parts like hands and feet lacked enough soft tissue to be attractive to scavengers, so apparent injuries to sites like digits and metapodials were more likely to be injuries received in life than to be traces of post mortem feeding. Molnar also cautioned fellow researchers that when unusual fusions between, or asymmetry of the skull bones are found it means the individual in question was probably just suffering from advanced age rather than specific illness.

== History of research ==
Scientific documentation of pathologies in theropod bones goes all the way back to the first description of a large theropod. Nevertheless, Ralph Molnar contends that despite the long history of recognized pathologies in theropod dinosaurs the topic had been almost completely overlooked in the scientific literature. For most of the ensuing 200 years paleopathologies were only noted when scientists describing new species were concerned that such abnormalities would complicate comparisons between different kinds of theropod for classification purposes. Even when paleontologists mentioned pathologies in their research they typically didn't try to ascertain their causes. This inattention towards theropod paleopathology kept science in the dark about the subject and many pathological specimens probably went completely unnoticed. By 2001, 13 species in 13 genera had reported pathologies. That year, Ralph Molnar performed a comprehensive review of the subject and found pathologies in 21 genera from 10 families.

== Affected taxa ==
=== Primitive saurischians ===
The Herrerasaurus ischigualastensis specimen PVSJ 407 had a pit in a skull bone, with two more pits on the lower jaw. Paul Sereno and Novas thought that they were obtained in a fight with another Herrerasaurus due to their size and differing directions of penetration. A short-lived non-fatal infection left the bone around these puncture wounds swollen and porous.

=== Primitive theropods ===
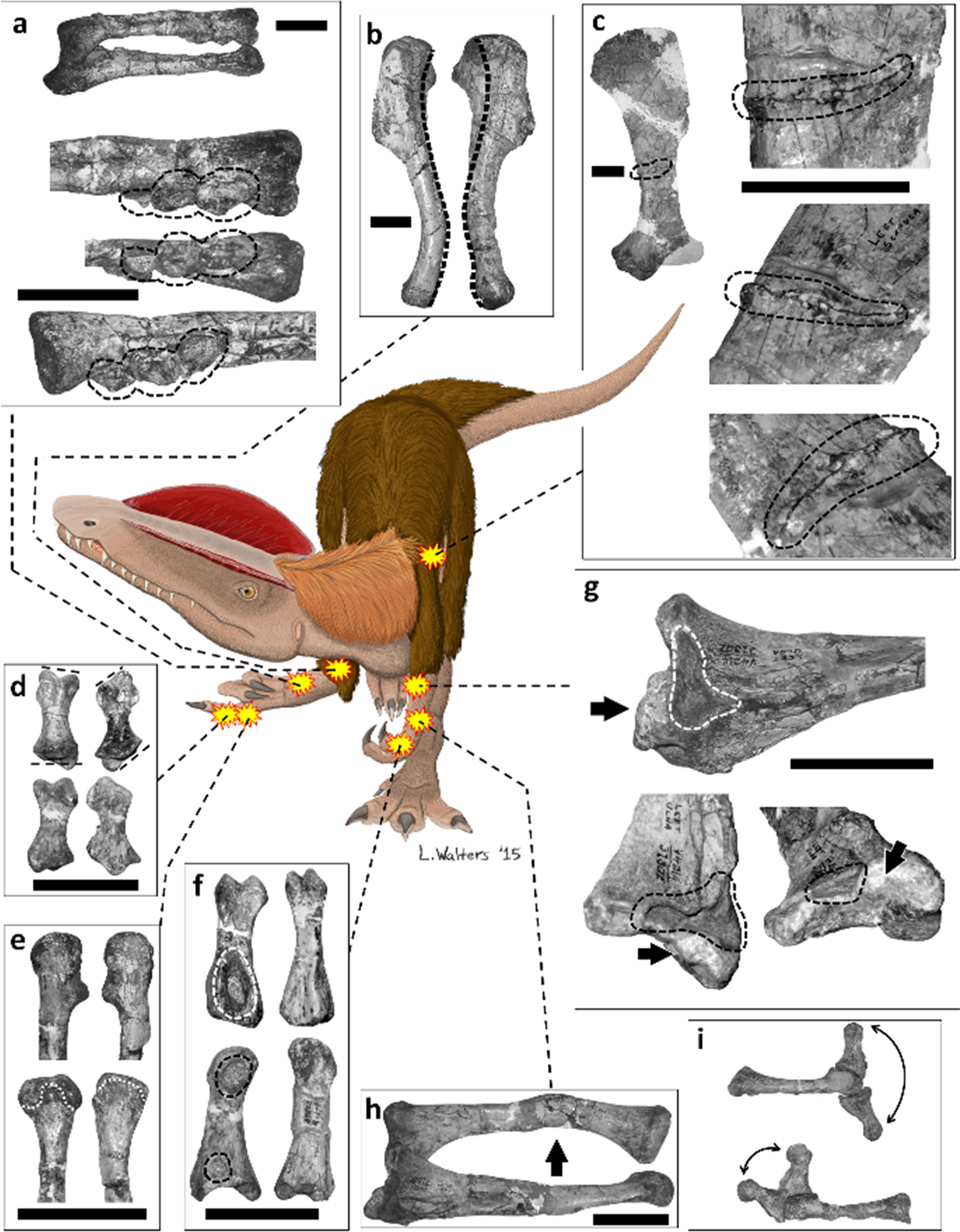
Paleopathologies in bones of a Dilophosaurus specimen, plotted onto a life restoration

One Dilophosaurus wetherilli specimen has a left humerus that is smaller than its right one. This asymmetry may have been a congenital deformity brought on by environmental stress during development. Another specimen bears both a possible abscessed humerus and injured vertebra.

Coelophysis rhodesiensis specimens, on very rare occasions, show signs of healed fractures in the tibia and metatarsus. An asymmetrical sacral rib has also been documented in this species. Like the D. wetherilli specimen mentioned above, this asymmetry was likely a congenital deformity caused by stress experience during development.

=== Ceratosaurs ===
The holotype specimen of Ceratosaurus nasicornis, USMN 4735, was found with its second, third, and fourth left metatarsals fused. Whether or not this fusion was pathological or normal for the species became controversial when Baur in 1890 speculated that the fusion was the result of a healed fracture. A later analysis by Darren Tanke and Bruce Rothschild supported Baur's contention. An unidentified species of Ceratosaurus preserved a broken and subsequently further worn tooth. A stress fracture in a single Ceratosaurus toe bone has also been discovered.

=== Megalosauroids ===
A Megalosaurus rib figured in 1856 and 1884 publications by Sir Richard Owen is swollen at the point where it would have articulated with its vertebra.

The Monolophosaurus jiangi specimen IVP 84019 had its 10th and possibly 11th neural spines fractured. The tenth neural spine is fused to the eleventh. A series of parallel ridges on one of the specimens' dentaries may represent tooth marks.

=== Allosauroids ===
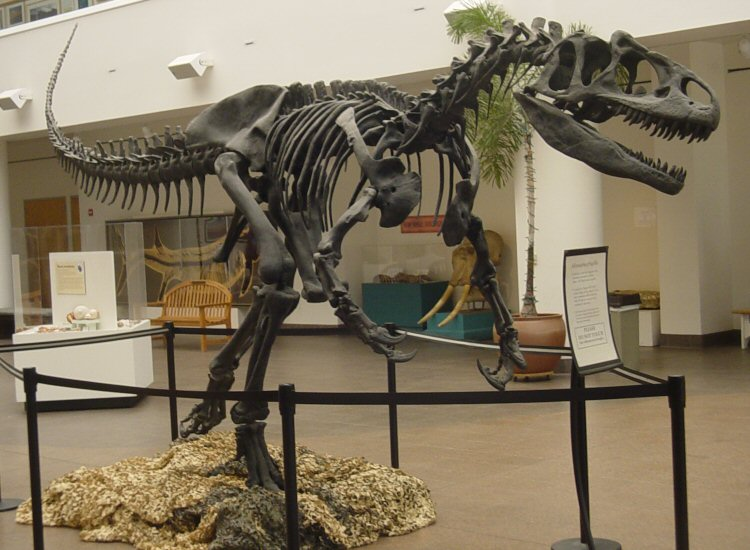
Allosaurus fragilis was found to have the highest number of stress fractures of any theropod examined in a 2001 study.

A Poekilopleuron bucklandii individual preserves three different kinds of documented pathologies. The first is a tail vertebra with an exostosis ankylosing the chevron of one vertebra to the centrum of the next. The second is a phalanx, probably belonging to the animal's foot, that shows three low, irregular exostoses. Lastly, a phalanx that probably belong to the animal's hand exhibits a short round callus. A British bombing raid near the end of the Second World War destroyed the specimen, thus it is impossible to study the causes of these pathologies.

The Allosaurus jimmadseni specimen MOR 693 exhibits at least 14 separate bone pathologies. The animal had multiple broken bones in its hands and feet, including fractures in the first phalanx of the first finger, first and third segments of the first and third toes and the third and fifth metatarsals. The head of the first phalanx of the third toe also contained a possible involucrum. Multiple pathologies were also observed in five ribs and cervical vertebrae 6, thoracics (3rd, 8th, 13th) and chevron of the second tail vertebra. The right scapula, gastralia and ilium were also affected, with the ilial fracture suggesting overhead impact.

The left scapula and fibula of an Allosaurus fragilis specimen catalogued as USNM 4734 both have healed fractures. The specimen USNM 8367 preserved several pathological gastralia which preserve evidence of healed fractures near their middle. Some of these fractures produced false joints because they didn't heal well.

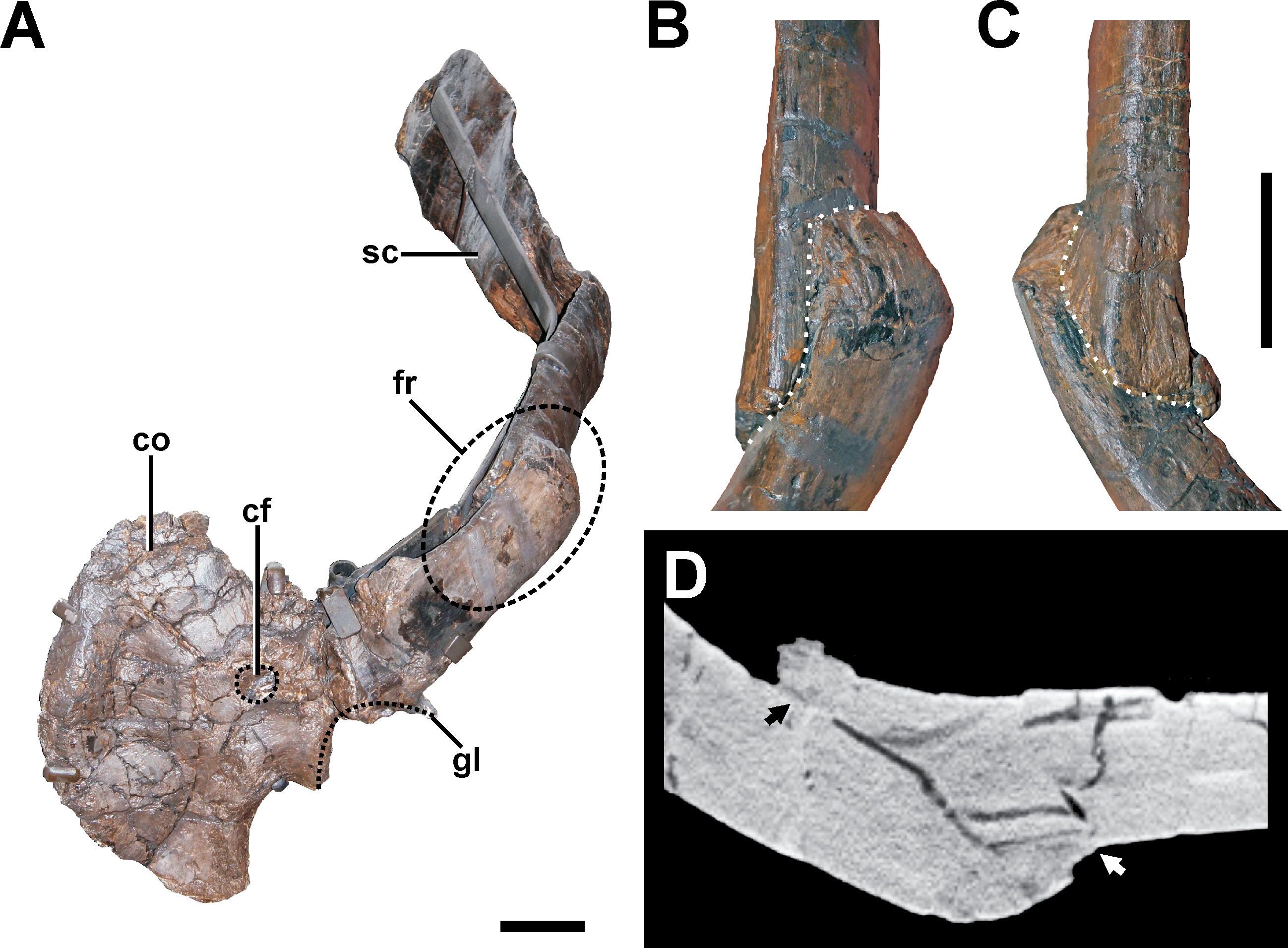
Fractured Allosaurus scapula

The Cleveland-Lloyd Dinosaur Quarry has produced pathological A. fragilis specimens; one had a vertebral fusion near the end of the tail fractured ribs while the other just had a fractured rib.

In 2001, Bruce Rothschild and others published a study examining evidence for tendon avulsions and stress fractures in theropod dinosaurs and the implications for their behavior. Allosaurus was one of only two theropods found to show evidence of an avulsion injury, with the second being Tyrannosaurus. Rothschild and the other researchers observed that seventeen of the 281 toe bones referred to Allosaurus examined showed signs of stress fractures. Three of the forty-seven finger bones also examined were likewise found to have stress fractures. Allosaurus had a significantly greater number of bumps on the shafts of its bones (a sign of stress fractures) than the tyrannosaurid Albertosaurus or the ornithomimids Ornithomimus and Archaeornithomimus.

Other pathologies reported in Allosaurus include:

- Willow breaks in two ribs.
- Healed fractures in the humerus and radius.
- Lesions similar to those caused by osteomyelitis in two scapulae.
- Distortion of joint surfaces in the foot possibly due to osteoarthritis or complications in the animal's development.
- Similar distortions in the tail vertebrae.
- "[E]xtensive 'neoplastic' ankylosis of caudals," possibly due to physical trauma as well as the fusion of chevrons to centra.
- Split carinae.
- Amputation of a chevron and part of a foot, both possibly a result of bites.
- "[E]xtensive exostoses" of the first phalanx of the third toe.
- Coossification of centra in the vertebrae near the end of the tail.
- Bone spurs in a premaxilla, claw, and two metacarpals.
- Exostosis in a toe bone possibly attributable to an infectious disease.
- A metacarpal with a round depressed fracture.

The species Labrosaurus ferox was purportedly distinguishable from A fragilis by having a toothless region at the front of the mouth. Some experts have thought this toothlessness was the result of physical trauma, rather than being a natural feature distinguishing different species. Both erupted and replacement teeth were removed. The area they previously occupied formed a concavity as bone surrounding the alveoli was reabsorbed by the animal's body.

The holotype of Neovenator salerii had many pathologies, including; a fractured scapula, bone spurs in its toes, vertebral fusions near the middle of the tail, healed fractures of vertebral transverse processes in the same region, and healed gastralia fractures (some of which formed false joints).

The Sinraptor dongi skull IVPP 10600 exhibits a lesion that fully penetrated the bone, gouges, punctures and drag marks left by the teeth of another dinosaur. One rib was broken and later healed by lengthening the shaft connecting it to its vertebra.

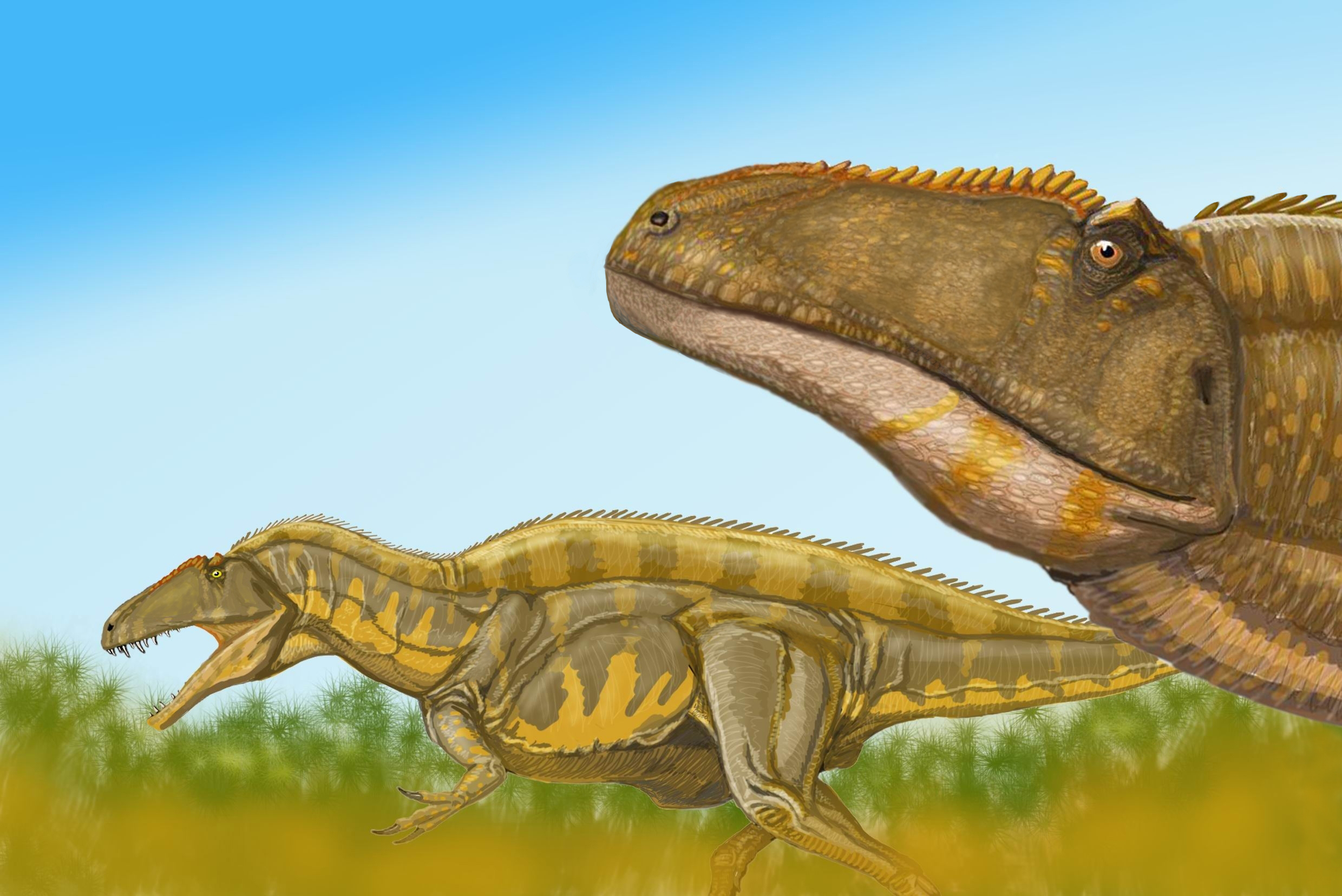
Acrocanthosaurus atokensis

The skull of the Acrocanthosaurus atokensis holotype shows some exostosis on the squamosal. Additionally, the neural spine of the eleventh vertebra was fractured and healed. The third tail vertebra bears a strange hook-shaped projection.

More recent research has uncovered another specimen with an even greater number of pathologies. The broken and displaced 16th tail vertebrae has a pit which may be from a bite wound. A thick boney mass at the flexure probably originated with an infection. Healed fractures on five ribs were interpreted by the original describer of the specimens as originating in a single incident. One rib has evidence of a false joint whose components later reconnected. This rib injury occurs at a different location along the length of the rib than the afore mentioned five and probably originated in a separate incident. The five were at the far end and the rejoined pseudoarthoritic pathology near the middle.

The near end of the 13th rib was fractured and bore a pit possible originating with a bite. The specimen has other potential pathologies including a belly rib with a false joint and a deviation to the right of the third and fourth neural spines of the neck vertebrae. Harris suggested that the neural spines were curved in life because only the third and fourth ones were curved and the rest were straight. However, Ralph Molnar observed that Harris had an additional vertebra figured with a curved neural spine.

Larson reported that a third specimen housed at the North Carolina State Museum of the Natural Sciences had several ribs that had all been broken and later healed. A pathology marking its scapula was either a puncture wound or an area of infection.

SGM-Din 1, a Carcharodontosaurus saharicus skull has a circular puncture wound in the nasal and a pathological bony projection on the rim of its eye socket facing the front of its body.

The top third of three Becklespinax altispinax back vertebrae from Sussex have irregular rugosities. The two spines closest to the skull are ankylosed. The single closest spine is only about two-thirds the height of the others.

Injury has deformed one right ilium of a Marshosaurus bicentesimus. Another M. bicentesimus specimen has a pathological rib.

=== Tyrannosaurids ===
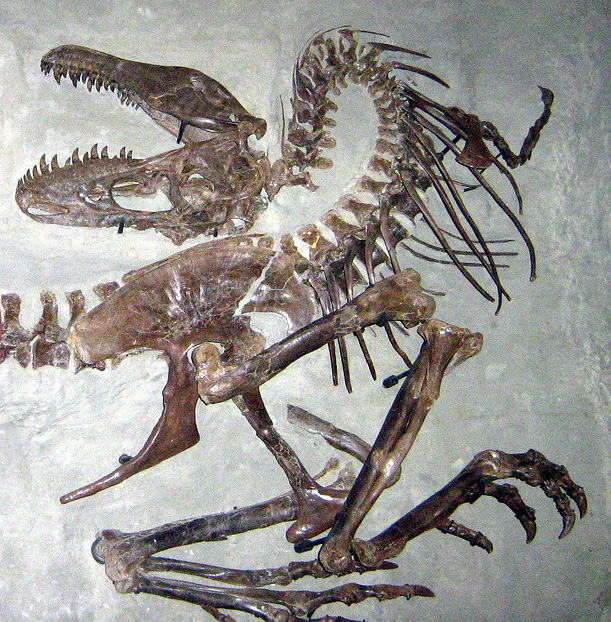
Gorgosaurus libratus

Tyrannosaurids are one of the few theropod families with pathologies reported in multiple well known genera. In 2001, Bruce Rothschild and others published a study examining evidence for stress fractures in theropod dinosaurs. Three of the 105 toe bones from indeterminate tyrannosaurids were found to have stress fractures. One of the five finger bones also examined were found to have stress fractures. An undescribed tyrannosaur stored in the Museum of the Rockies has a fractured humerus that healed in such a way leaving it shorter and with a more pronounced curve than a healthy specimen. Three of its ribs also seem to have been fractured and healed. The specimen TMP97.12.229 had a fractured and healed gastralium. The first phalanx of the first toe in an unidentified tyrannosaur individual is eroded in a manner resembling that attributed to gout in a T. rex specimen by earlier researchers. In Dinosaur Provincial Park, 29% of collected tyrannosaur teeth were broken and worn after the break, although the abundance of such teeth in the park may be higher than it would have been among living tyrannosaurs.

Several pathologies are known from the genus Albertosaurus. Toothmarks have been discovered on the skull of a specimen from an unidentified Albertosaurus species. Split carinae are also known in Albertosaurus teeth. Cuts and striation marks in parallel series etched into Albertosaurus teeth have been interpreted as bite marks. In the Rothschild and others survey of theropod stress fractures, they found that one of the 319 toe bones referred to Albertosaurus had a stress fracture. None of the four finger bones also examined had any stress fractures. This was significantly fewer than was found in Allosaurus.

Two of the five Albertosaurus sarcophagus specimens with humeri in 1970 were reported by Russel as having pathological damage to them. The holotype of "A. arctunguis", ROM 807, now referred to Albertosaurus sarcophagus had a 2.5 by 3.5 cm deep hole in the ilium. At the time this now deprecated species was described, however, the author did not recognize the hole as pathological. The specimen also contains some exostosis on the fourth left metatarsal.

In the Gorgosaurus libratus holotype NMC 2120 the third right back rib, 13th and 14th gastralia, and left fibula all have healed fractures. The fourth left metatarsal bore rough exostoses at its midpoint and near the far end. The third phalanx of the third right toe is deformed and the claw on the digit is "quite small and amorphous". All three pathologies may have been received in a single encounter with another dinosaur.

Another specimen catalogued as TMP94.12.602 bears multiple pathologies. A 10 cm fracture runs down the long axis at the midlength of the right fibula. Multiple ribs bear healed fractures and the specimen had a pseudoarthortic belly rib. Lesions from a bite received to the face were present and showed evidence of healing.

TMP91.36.500 is another Gorgosaurus with preserved face bite injuries and a thoroughly healed fracture in the right fibula. Also present was a healed fracture on the skull and what the authors describing the specimen described as a "mushroom-like" swelling on a right toe. Molnar speculates this may be the same kind of pathology afflicting an unidentified ornithomimid specimen.

Another Gorgosaurus specimen has a poorly healed fracture of the right fibula, which left a large callus on the bone.

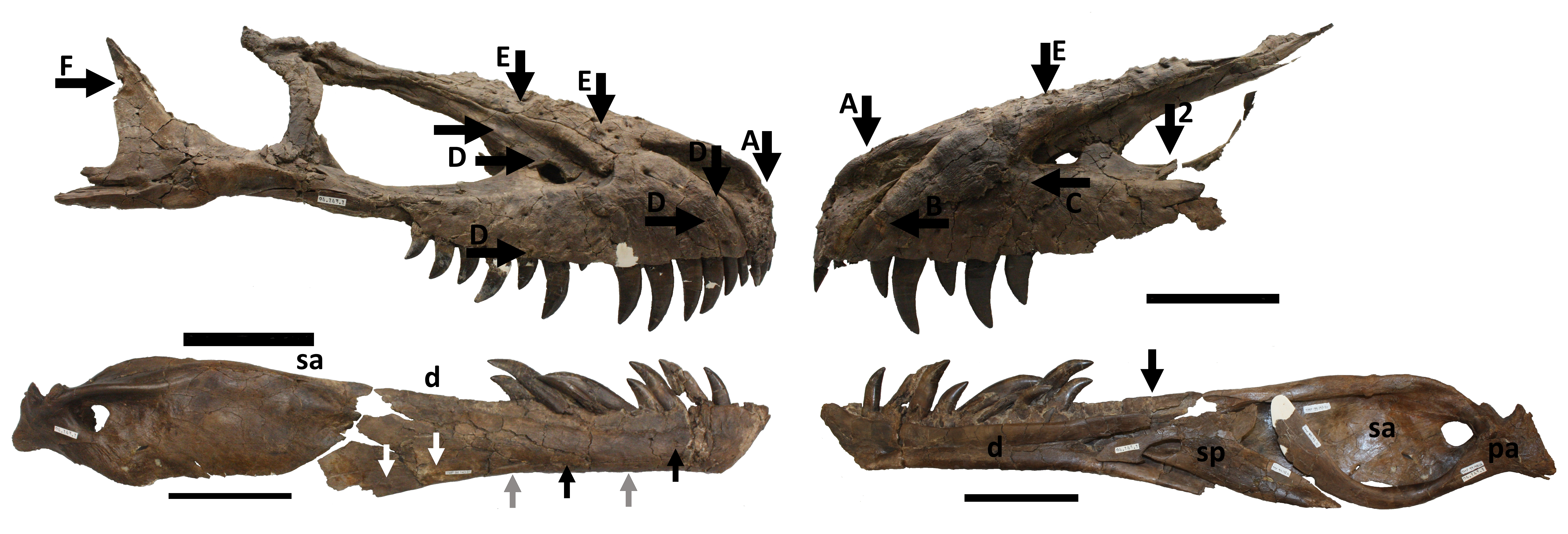
Daspletosaurus skull with bite marks from another tyrannosaur

A pathological specimen from a possible species of Daspletosaurus, according to Williamson and Carr, was discovered New Mexico's Kirtland Formation. One of its skull bones received an infection in a puncture wound sustained from a bite. One of its ribs shows signs of a healed fracture. Split carinae are also known from Daspletosaurus.

The holotype of Daspletosaurus torosus, NMC 8506, has a pathology on the far end of its humerus.

The Rothschild and others stress fracture survey found no stress fractures in any of the eighteen toe bones referred to Tarbosaurus. One of the ten finger bones also examined were found to have stress fractures.

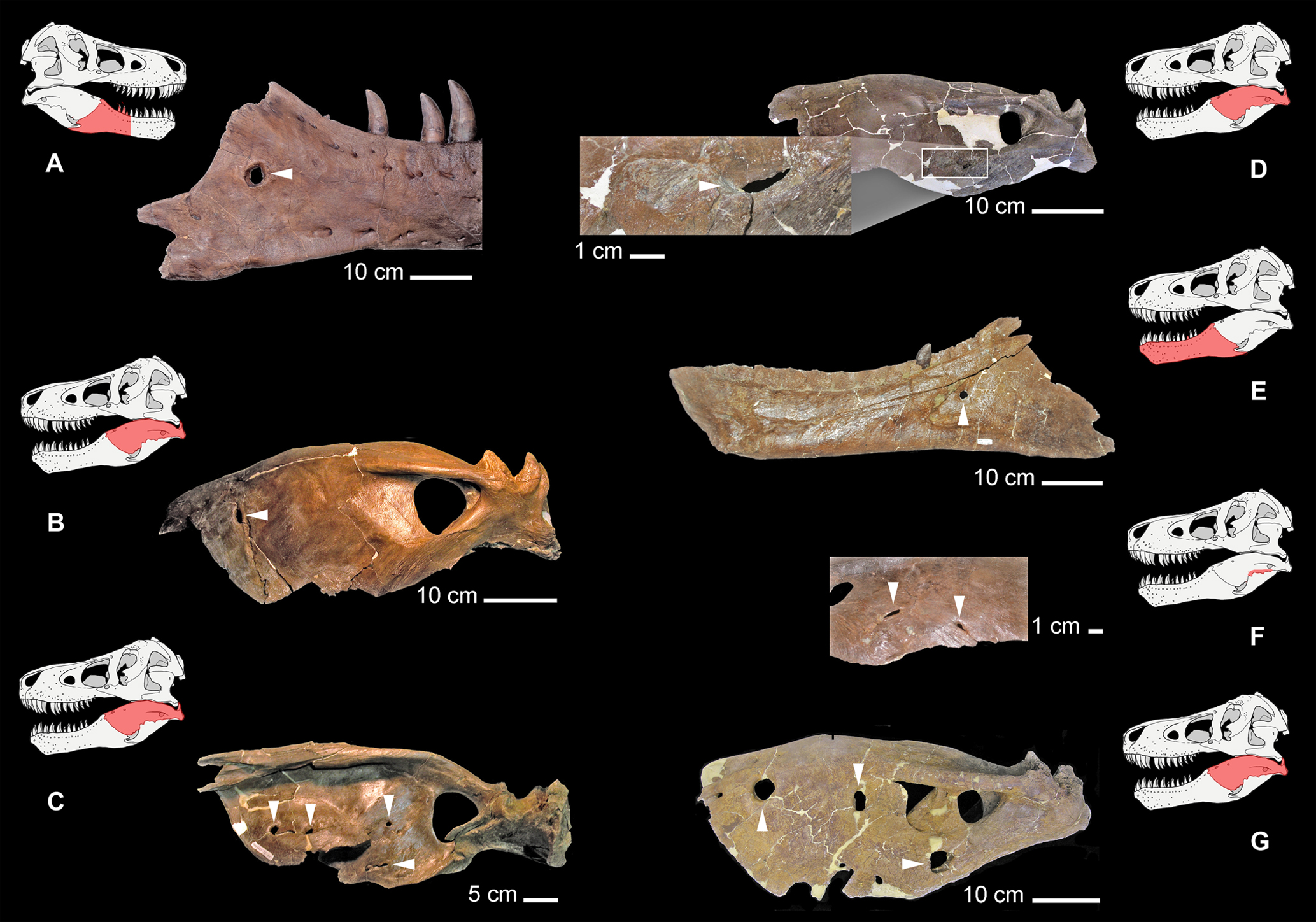
Lessions and pathologies in several Tyrannosaurus rex specimens

Bruce Rothschild and others' 2001 survey for stress fractures found that one of the eighty-one toe bones referred to Tyrannosaurus had a stress fracture. None of the ten finger bones also examined were found to have stress fractures. Pathological holes occur in the skulls of some specimens. A T. rex has a punctured skull with wrinkly-textured bone possibly caused by an infection. This wound may have been received from a bite. Broken and subsequently worn teeth are known from Tyrannosaurus. One preserved T. rex jaw bears a strongly tilted tooth crown. This may be the result of the animal biting something hard, like bone, although Molnar says the specimen needs to be examined to rule out post mortem damage to the carcass. Split carinae are also known from T. rex. Some experts have wondered if the split was due to damage to the dentigerous tissue, but paleontologists have generally concluded that the condition was genetic. Extraneous tooth cusps are documented in Tyrannosaurus. Some teeth show evidence of bite marks by other Tyrannosaurus.

The Tyrannosaurus rex specimen AMNH 5027 has a deformity fusing the centra of the seventh and eighth back vertebrae. The centra of the tenth neck and first back vertebrae are fused in a similar fashion. In 1923 Moodie reported a T. rex specimen as having spondylitis deformans, probably referring to the fused vertebrae of this specimens. Molnar still maintains that this is a congenital block vertebra. It had fractured ribs, too.

Bruce Rothschild and others also examined the evidence for tendon avulsions during their survey of theropod stress fractures. Tyrannosaurus was one of only two theropods found to have suffered avulsion injuries, with the second being Allosaurus. Sue the T. rex, also known as FMNH PR2081, suffered an avulsion that left a divot and hook-shaped bone spur on "her" right humerus. The divot appears to be located at the origin of the deltoid or teres major muscles. Some experts have hypothesized that gout caused the formation of small patches of eroded bone discovered on Sue's first and second metacarpals. Five other pathologies have been documented in Sue; a pathology on each side of its skull, a twisted and discolored tooth, two pathological tail vertebrae in series, and a broken and healed fibula with associated abnormal bone growth.

The specimen Stan BHI-3033 has pathologies like broken ribs and ankylosed neck vertebrae. Another account mentions the specimen having unnatural holes on the right side of its skull.

=== Ornithomimosaurs ===
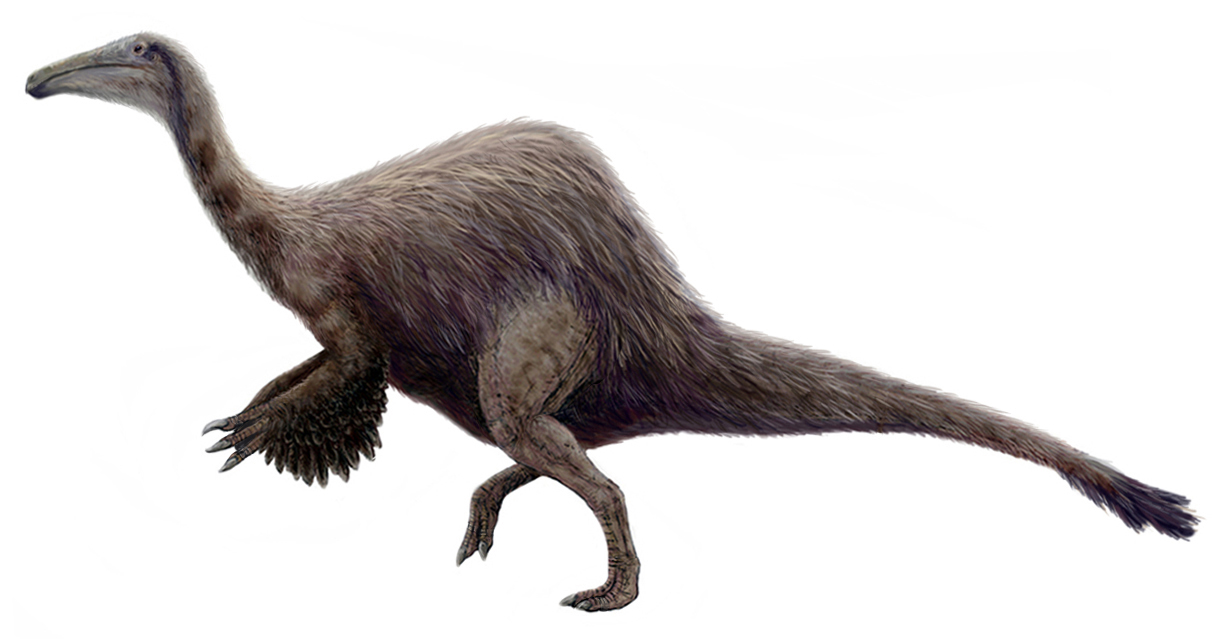
Artistic restoration of Deinocheirus mirificus.

In the holotype of Deinocheirus mirificus, ZPALNo.Mgd-I/6, an injury to the joint between the first and second phalanges of its third finger may be responsible for pits scientists have observed there.

A toe bone from an unidentified ornithomimid has a pathology on its far end, causing the joint to appear "mushroomed" compared to healthy specimens. The same pathology may have been found in a specimen of the tyrannosaurid Gorgosaurus.

Remains of an unidentified theropod, which may one day turn out to be Timimus hermani or a relative, were recovered from the Strzelecki Group near Inverloch, Victoria. This specimen had a depressed fracture on the bottom of the first phalanx of its third toe.

In a 2001 survey of stress fractures in theropods, one toe bone from indeterminate ornithomimids out of fifteen examined was found to have a stress fracture. None of the eight finger bones examined was found to have a stress fracture. Ornithomimus and Archaeornithomimus showed a significantly lower number of stress fractures than Allosaurus.

In the arms of a specimen referred to "Struthiomimus currelli", the right radius is only about 80% as long as the left. The right ulna is shorter than the left ulna by a similar amount.

=== Oviraptorosaurs ===
The brooding oviraptorid specimen IGM 100/979 showed a callus and possible longitudinal groove left over from a healed fracture of the right ulna. Other oviraptorids have had pathological features reported in their phalanges but by 2001 these had not been described in detail for the scientific literature.

In 2001, Bruce Rothschild and others published a study examining evidence for stress fractures in theropod dinosaurs. They found one phalanx referred to Chirostenotes was found to have a stress fracture out of the fifteen they examined.

=== Deinonychosaurs ===
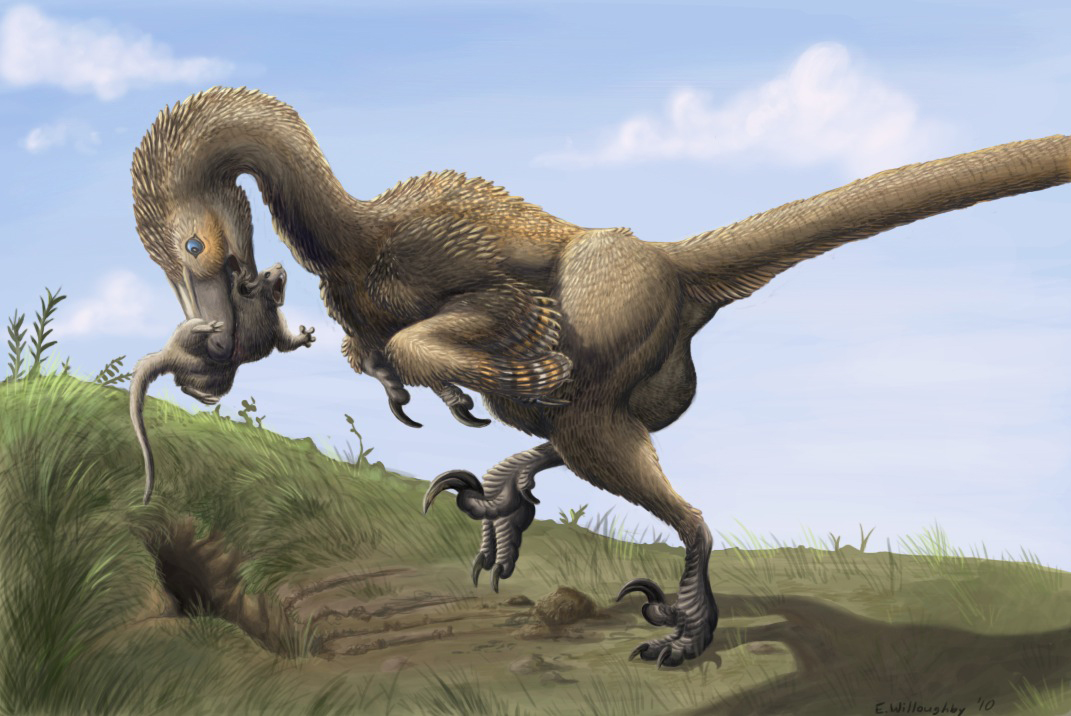
Restoration of a Saurornitholestes langstoni digging a multituberculate out of a burrow

A specimen of Troodon formosus bears a pathological opening. Competing explanations for this pathology include a cyst or bite wound. One hatchling specimen may have suffered from a congenital defect resulting in the front part of its lower jaw being twisted.

An undescribed immature dromaeosaurid from Tugrugeen Shireh has been reported with a split belly rib.

In 2001, Bruce Rothschild and others published a study examining evidence for stress fractures in theropod dinosaurs. They found four toe bones from unidentifiable dromaeosaurids out of seventeen examined had stress fractures. Four of the twelve finger bones they also examined were likewise found to have stress fractures. Dromaeosaurids were the only theropods in Ralph Molar's 2001 survey to have pathologies of their claws. Fifty percent of lesions in dromaeosaurid's hands were such pathologies of the claws.

The second phalanx of the second toe of YPM 5205, a Deinonychus antirrhopus specimen, has a healed fracture.

A Velociraptor mongoliensis skull bears two parallel rows of small punctures matching the spacing of teeth in Velociraptor, so the injury was probably received in combat with another V. mongoliensis. Because there was no sign of healing, the researchers who first reported the injury concluded it killed the afflicted animal.

Two of the eighty-two toe bones referred to Saurornitholestes were found to have stress fractures in the Rothschild and others study mentioned above. Two of the nine finger bones also examined were found to have stress fractures.

== Documented conditions ==
Molnar's 2001 review found that most theropod pathologies reported in the scientific literature had not or could not be attributed to a specific cause. Most pathologies preserved in theropod fossils are the remains of injuries, even taking into consideration gaps in paleontology's knowledge of most pathologies' causes, but some provide evidence of infections or congenital deformities. Injuries found on theropod dinosaur bones tended to be fractures, pits, and punctures, often likely originating with bites. Damage left by infections tended to be concentrated in relatively small areas.

- Abscesses
- Amputations
- Ankylosis
- Asymmetrically sized body parts.
- Avulsion injuries
- Block vertebrae
- Broken teeth
- Bone spurs
- Co-Ossification
- Cysts
- Exostosis
- Fractured bones
- Fused bones
- Gout
- Greenstick fractures
- Holes in bones
- Infections
- Involucra
- Lesions
- Osteoarthritis
- Osteomyelitis
- Pseudoarthrosis
- Puncture wounds
- Split carinae in teeth
- Spondylitis
- Stress fractures
- Supernumerary tooth crowns
- Twisted body parts

== Trace fossil pathologies ==
Fossil tracks can be informative about theropod pathologies but apparently pathological traits may also be due to unusual behaviors. Pathologies observed in foot bones are similar those reported from track fossils.

An Anchisauripus trackway preserved in Norian aged sandstone was discovered in southern Wales that had its third toe consistently flexed throughout the trackway. The bend in the toe may have been a deformity, but this apparent pathology could also have been caused by the animal rotating the tip of that digit when lifting the foot with each step.

A trackway attributed to the ichnogenus Eubrontes had a missing second digit on the right foot. The animal could have either lost the toe due to injury or it was deformed.

A Sauroidichnites abnormis trackway has been found with one toe consistently in an abnormal position. This could be a result of physical injury or represent the effect of behavior on the way the foot is positioned or lifted from the substrate.

A small theropod track from Jurassic Morocco shows a specimen with a limp inferable from its alternating step length. Its third and fourth toe were held unusually close to each other, possibly because of the injury that caused the limp. However, several non-pathological causes for alternating step length are possible.

== Anatomical distribution ==
The most common sites of preserved injury and disease in theropod dinosaur in the ribs and tail vertebrae. The least common sites of preserved injury are the cranium and forelimb in about equal frequency. The least common sites of preserved pathology are the weight-bearing bones like the tibia, femur and sacrum. The lack of preserved injuries in skeletal elements like femora suggests that they were selected by evolution for resistance to breakage.

Forelimb pathologies tended to be close to the body, occurring in bones like the scapula or humerus. Toe bone fractures were usually located near the base of toes, but occurred across all three major digits in a roughly equal frequency. Pathologies of the claws were only noted among dromaeosaurids, where they represented 50% of lesions afflicting one or more hands. Pathological vertebrae were most common in the tail.

- Head: 18%
- Forelimb: 17%
- Vertebrae and ribs: 40%
- Hindlimb: 25%

== Implications ==
=== Anatomical ===
Preserved pathologies are less common among small theropods. This may be due to the tendency of larger animals to leave better preserved and more complete remains. Fractures, specifically, are less than a fifth as common in small theropods as large ones. Molnar has tentatively speculated that size may be a factor in determining which theropods suffered fractures. The location of avulsion injuries in theropod scapulae as evidenced by the tendon avulsion in Sue the T. rex suggests that theropods may have had a musculature more complex and functionally different from those of birds.

=== Developmental ===
The presence of pathologies attributable to congenital deformities offers science a powerful tool for inferring the evolutionary history of the processes involved in animal development. For instance, the presence of a congenital block vertebra in T. rex suggests that the basic development pattern of vertebrae goes at least as far back as the most recent common ancestor of archosaurs and mammals.

Fluctuating asymmetry is a congenital deformity that results from developmental disturbances and is more common in populations under stress. Consequently, it can be informative about the quality of conditions the animals lived under. Examples of fluctuating asymmetry are too rare among theropod fossils to observe any patterns, but during periods of extinction, if the cause was gradual and sustained, asymmetries should be seen more frequently.

=== Behavioral ===
In 2001, Bruce Rothschild and others published a study examining evidence for stress fractures in theropod dinosaurs and the implications for their behavior. Stress fractures are more useful than other paleopathologies for providing evidence for theropod behavior because they are caused by repeated strain rather than individual injuries. The lower end of a theropod's third metatarsal would contact the ground first while a theropod was running, which means it would have borne the most stress and should be most predisposed to suffer stress factors. The lack of such a bias in the examined fossils indicates an origin for stress fractures from a source other than running. The authors concluded that these fractures occurred during interaction with prey. They suggested that such injuries could occur as a result of the theropod trying to hold struggling prey with its feet.

Unlike injuries in the feet, which could be caused by running or migration, injuries to the hand are most likely be due to prey items resisting attack. The presence of stress fractures or tendon avulsions provide evidence for very active predatory rather than scavenging diets in the theropods. Crocodilians like Crocodylus niloticus or Crocodylus porosus show more extensive injuries than theropod dinosaurs and so may have been more aggressive with other members of the same species than theropods were. Ralph Molnar has speculated that depressed fractures on the feet may be a result of toe biting, a behavior common in modern parrots.

=== Evolutionary ===
Congenital deformities can be used to infer the evolutionary history of developmental processes.

=== Extinctionary ===
Fluctuating asymmetry results from developmental disturbances and is more common in populations under stress. Therefore, it can be informative about the quality of conditions the animals lived under. Examples of fluctuating asymmetry occur too infrequently to have provided much information to science so far, but during periods of extinction if the cause was gradual and sustained they should be more frequently.

== See also ==
- Paleopathology
- Osteology
- List of pathological dinosaur specimens
- List of pathological conditions reported in Mesozoic dinosaurs
