= List of pathological conditions reported in Mesozoic dinosaurs =

This list of pathological conditions reported in Mesozoic dinosaurs enumerates the various types of injury, disease, deformity or parasite infection identified among Mesozoic dinosaur fossils.

== The list ==
Pathology	Description	Taxa	Paleobiological significance	Images
Abscesses		Dilophosaurus wetherilli		
Amputations		Allosaurus and Eubrontes (ichnotaxon)		
Ankylosis				
Asymmetrically sized body parts.				
Avulsion injuries				
Block vertebrae				
Broken teeth				
Bone spurs				
Co-Ossification				
Cysts				
Exostosis				
Fractured bones				
Fused bones				
Gout				
Greenstick fractures				
Holes in bones				
Infections				
Involucra				
Lesions				
Osteoarthritis				
Osteomyelitis				
Pseudoarthrosis				
Puncture wounds				
Split carinae in teeth				
Spondylitis				
Stress fractures				
Supernumerary tooth crowns				
Twisted body parts				

== See also ==
- List of pathological dinosaur specimens
- Theropod paleopathology
