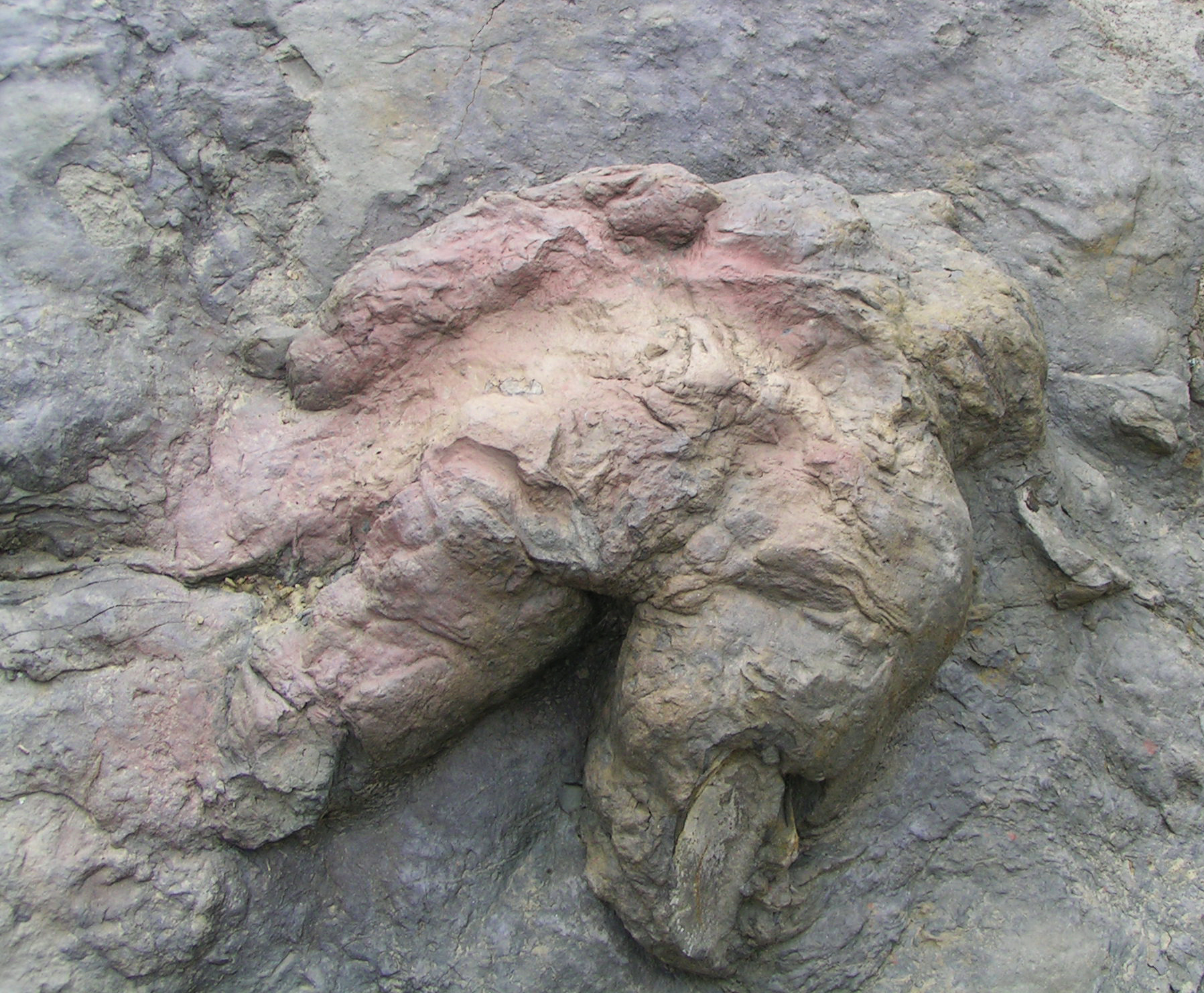
- Tyrannosauripus pillmorei

Trace fossil classification
- Ichnofamily: Tyrannosauripodidae; McCrea et al., 2014

Ichnogenera
- Bellatoripes; Tyrannosauripus

= Tyrannosauripodidae =

Ichnofamily of dinosaur footprints

Tyrannosauripodidae is an ichnofamily of dinosaur footprints.
