= Richard A. Thulborn =

British paleontologist

Richard Anthony (Tony) Thulborn (1940–2025) was a British-born Australian paleontologist known for his pioneering research on dinosaur tracks and the palaeobiology of prehistoric vertebrates. He is recognized as one of the most productive paleontologists of his time and a leading expert in vertebrate ichnology.

== Career ==
In 1976, Thulborn joined Dr Mary Wade and a team of volunteers to excavate the Lark Quarry dinosaur tracksite, located near Winton, Queensland. Their work uncovered what remains the world’s only known evidence of a dinosaur stampede, published in 1984, which captivated scientists and the public alike. He later critically reassessed these findings in Lark Quarry Revisited (2013), demonstrating rigorous methods in ichnological interpretation. His work helped secure the site’s inclusion on the Australian National Heritage List in 2004, ensuring its preservation for research and public education.

In 1982, Thulborn debunked the purported plesiosaur embryos discovered by Harry Govier Seeley. Thulborn concluded that Seeley's supposed embryos were actually nodules of mudstone and shale derived from sediments that once filled in a crustacean burrow system and were not even animal body fossils.

Thulborn’s research also included dinosaur locomotion, thermoregulation, tooth wear, jaw action, reproduction, and palaeobiology across diverse taxa. He investigated the evolutionary relationships of birds and theropods, including studies on Archaeopteryx, digit homology, and flight mechanics.

Thulborn also made important contributions to understanding Australia’s prehistoric vertebrate diversity, including mammal-like reptiles, dicynodonts, Triassic vertebrate faunas, plesiosaurs, and coprolites. His critical approach and publications influenced both Australian and international palaeontology.

== Honours ==
Thulborn was instrumental in securing recognition for Australia’s fossil heritage. He was widely respected for his scholarship and mentorship.

== Death ==
Richard Anthony Thulborn died on 22 July 2025, aged 81.

== Selected publications ==
Thulborn, R.A., & Wade, M. (1984). Dinosaur trackways in the Winton Formation (Mid-Cretaceous) of Queensland. Memoirs of the Queensland Museum, 21, 123–141.

Thulborn, R.A. (1984). Preferred gaits of bipedal dinosaurs. Historical Biology, 2(1), 17–32.

Thulborn, R.A. (1990). Dinosaur Tracks. Chapman & Hall.

Thulborn, R.A. (2007). Dinosaur Stampede in the Cretaceous of Queensland. Historical Biology, 19(1), 95–106.

Thulborn, R.A. (2013). Lark Quarry revisited: a critique of methods used to identify a large dinosaurian track-maker, Winton Formation. Historical Biology, 25, 203–219.

Thulborn, R.A. (2009). Tooth wear and jaw action in the Triassic ornithischian dinosaur Fabrosaurus. Historical Biology, 21, 19–33.

Thulborn, R.A. (2008). The avian relationships of Archaeopteryx, and the origin of birds. Journal of Vertebrate Paleontology, 28, 1–16.

Thulborn, R.A., & Turner, S. (2003). The last dicynodont: an Australian Cretaceous relict. Palaeontology, 46, 1–14.

Thulborn, R.A. (1973). Thermoregulation in dinosaurs. Lethaia, 6, 225–230.
