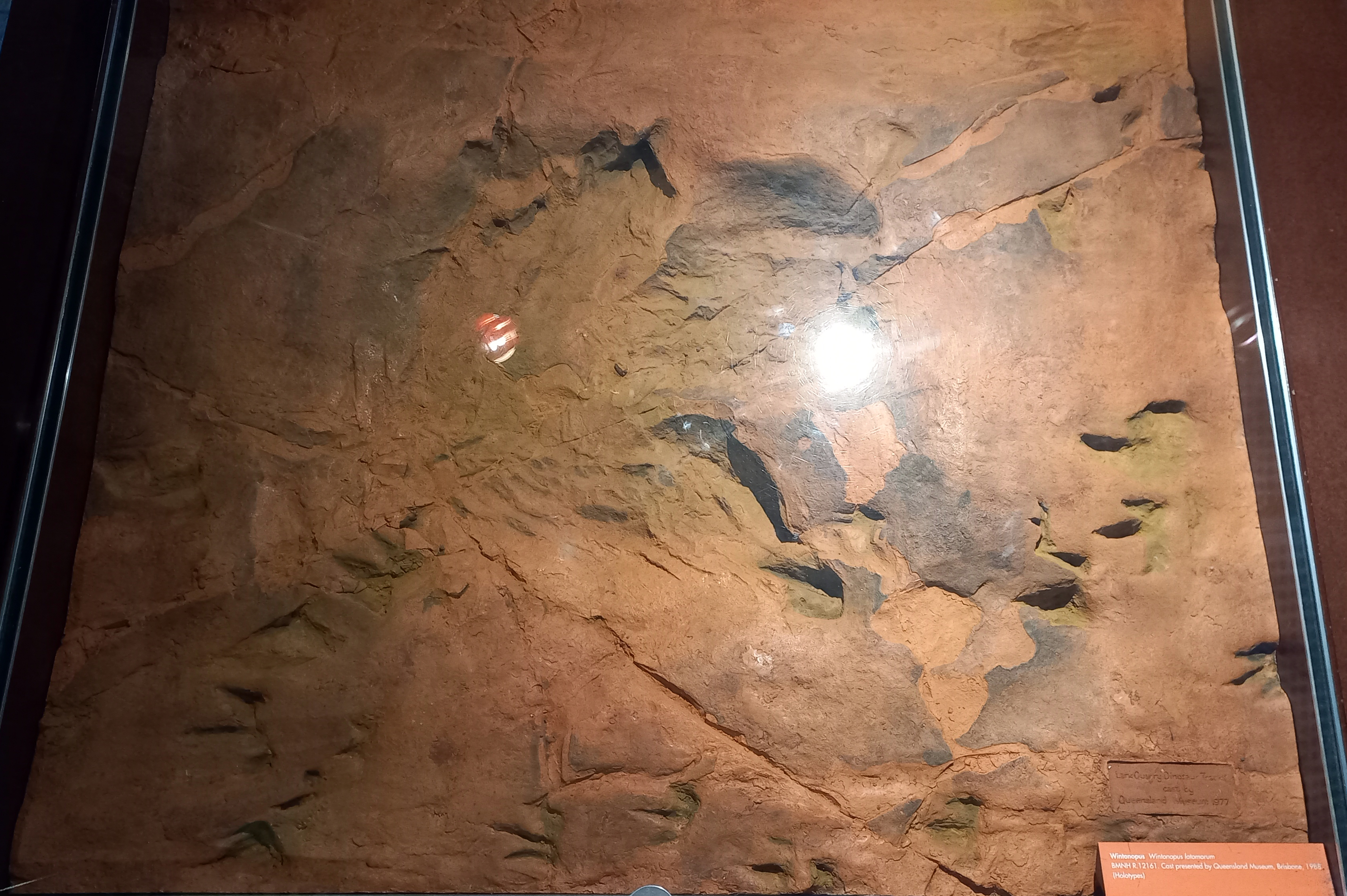
- W. latomorum holotype cast in Natural History Museum, London

Trace fossil classification
- Kingdom: Animalia
- Phylum: Chordata
- Class: Reptilia
- Clade: Dinosauria
- Clade: †Ornithischia
- Clade: †Ornithopoda
- Ichnogenus: †Wintonopus; Thulborn & Wade 1984

Ichnospecies
- †Wintonopus latomorum Thulborn & Wade 1984; †Wintonopus middletonae Salisbury et al. 2016

= Wintonopus =

Wintonopus Temporal range: Barremian-Cenomanian ~140–94 Ma

Dinosaur footprint

Wintonopus is an ichnogenus of dinosaur footprint. Its footprints have been found at Lark Quarry in Queensland Australia. The genus is named after the Winton Formation in which the tracks were found. Other tracks were found in the Broome Sandstone of Dampier Peninsula, Western Australia.

== See also ==
- List of dinosaur ichnogenera
