= Tyrannosauropus =

Tyrannosauropus Temporal range: Late Cretaceous, Campanian

Trace fossil classification
- Domain: Eukaryota
- Kingdom: Animalia
- Phylum: Chordata
- Clade: Dinosauria
- Clade: †Ornithischia
- Clade: †Ornithopoda
- Family: †Hadrosauridae
- Ichnogenus: †Tyrannosauropus; Haubold, 1971

Type ichnospecies
- †Tyrannosauropus petersoni Haubold, 1971

Dubious ichnogenus of a dinosaur footprint

Tyrannosauropus is a dubious ichnogenus of tridactyl dinosaur footprint from the Campanian of the Late Cretaceous of North America. Tyrannosauropus was named for a collection of footprints discovered on the ceiling of a cave in Utah which were suggested to have been made by Tyrannosaurus and informally labelled as "Tyrannosauripus" in 1924 (not to be confused with the separate, later ichnogenus Tyrannosauripus). These footprints would later be named by Haubold in 1971 as Tyrannosauropus petersoni, and attributed to Tyrannosaurus rex. However, Tyrannosauropus are Campanian in age, pre-dating the Maastrichtian age for Tyrannosaurus, and the morphology of the footprints more closely resembles those of hadrosaurid dinosaurs than those of theropods. Furthermore, in 1994 another footprint was described as likely belonging to Tyrannosaurus that matched it in both age and morphology and was named Tyrannosauripus. In the same publication, the description of Tyrannosauropus was deemed inadequate, with the holotype damaged and lost, and the ichnotaxon was declared undiagnostic and thus a nomen dubium.

In 1984, large tridactyl footprints discovered at the Lark Quarry trackway from the Winton Formation, Australia, were interpreted as most similar to Tyrannosauropus and were attributed to a large theropod trackmaker as cf. Tyrannosauropus. However, due to the likely hadrosaurid affinity of Tyrannosauropus, the identity of the cf. Tyrannosauropus track maker has been re-interpreted as a probable ornithopod, and suggested to belong to the ichnogenus Amblydactylus instead, itself likely made by the genus Muttaburrasaurus.

== See also ==
- List of dinosaur ichnogenera
- Ichnology
