= Lark Quarry Dinosaur Trackways =

Conservation park in Queensland, Australia

Coordinates: 23.0161°S 142.4114°E

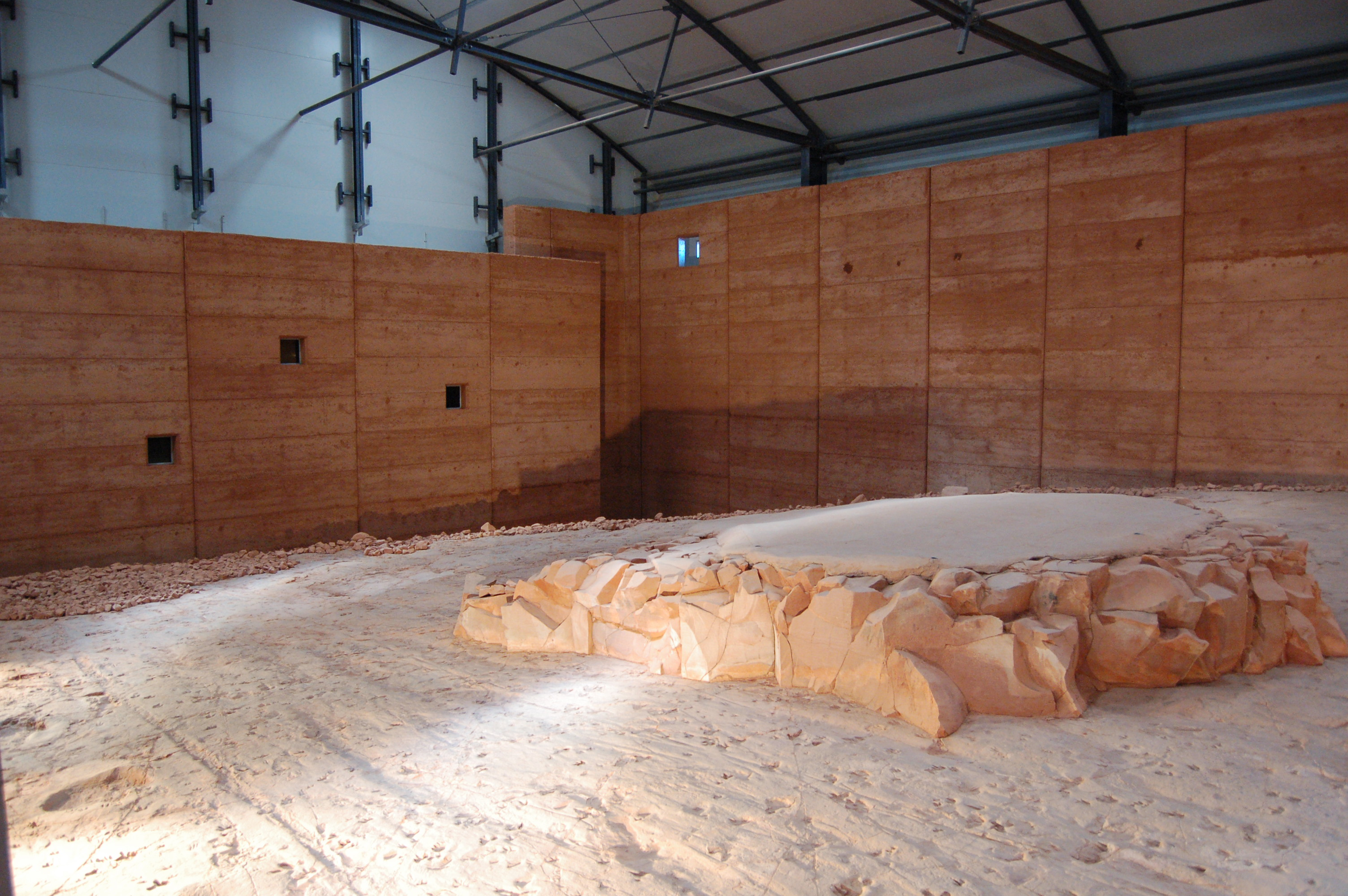
Therapod or potential Ornithopod sp., Wintonopus, and Skartopus dinosaur tracks at Lark Quarry.

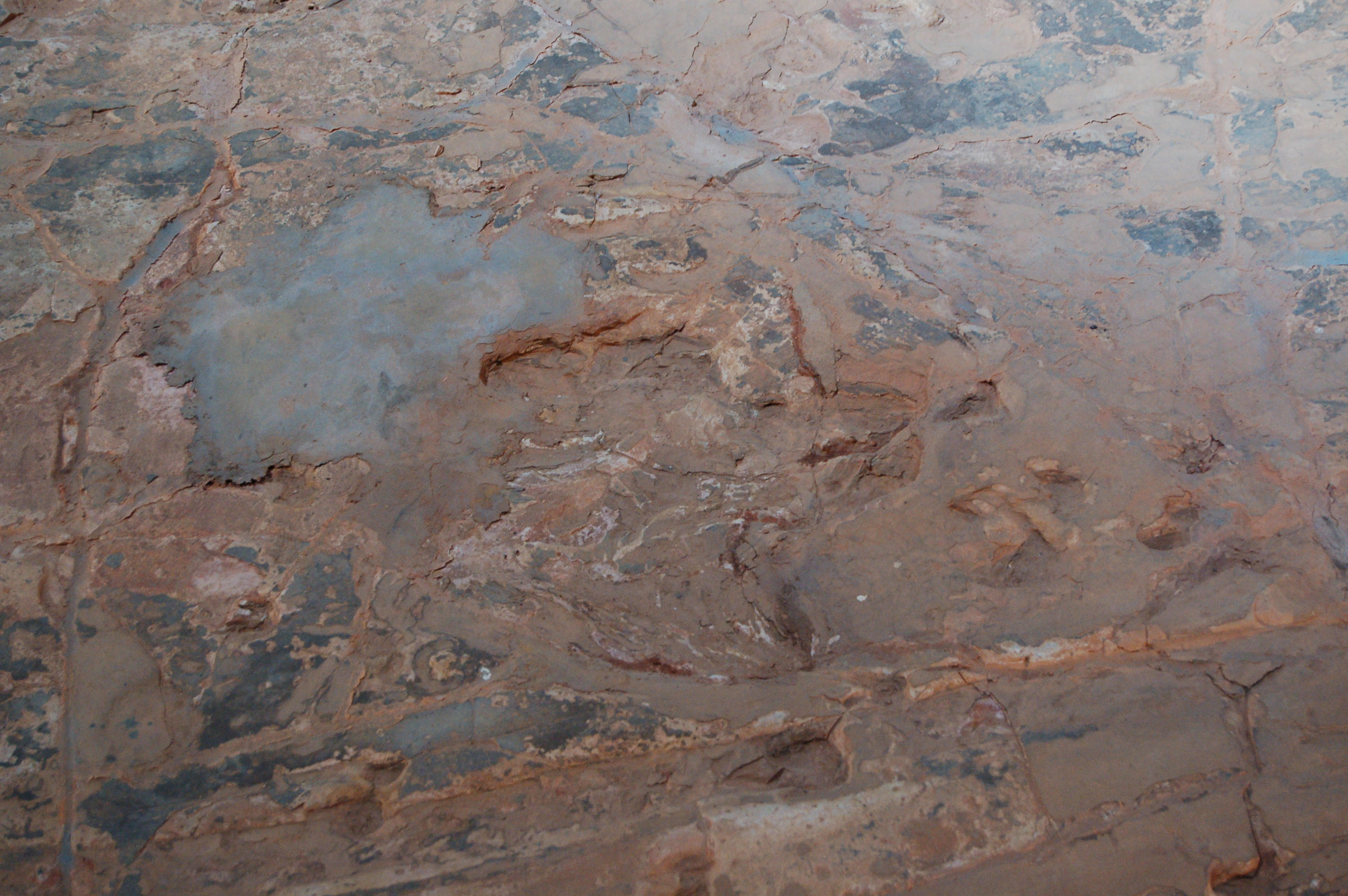
Close-up digital image of Dinosaur Tracks at Lark Quarry.

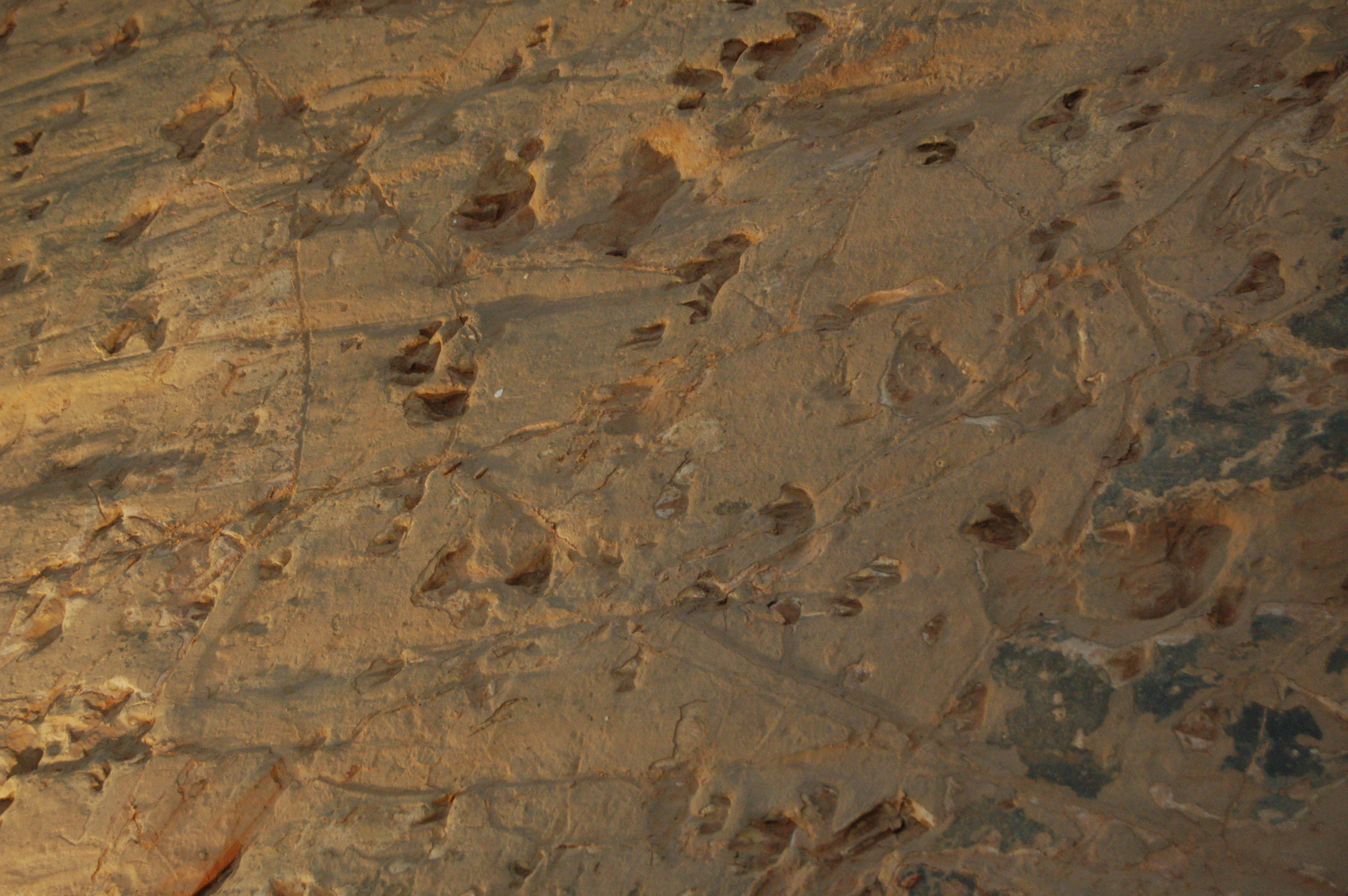
Close-up digital image of Dinosaur Tracks at Lark Quarry.

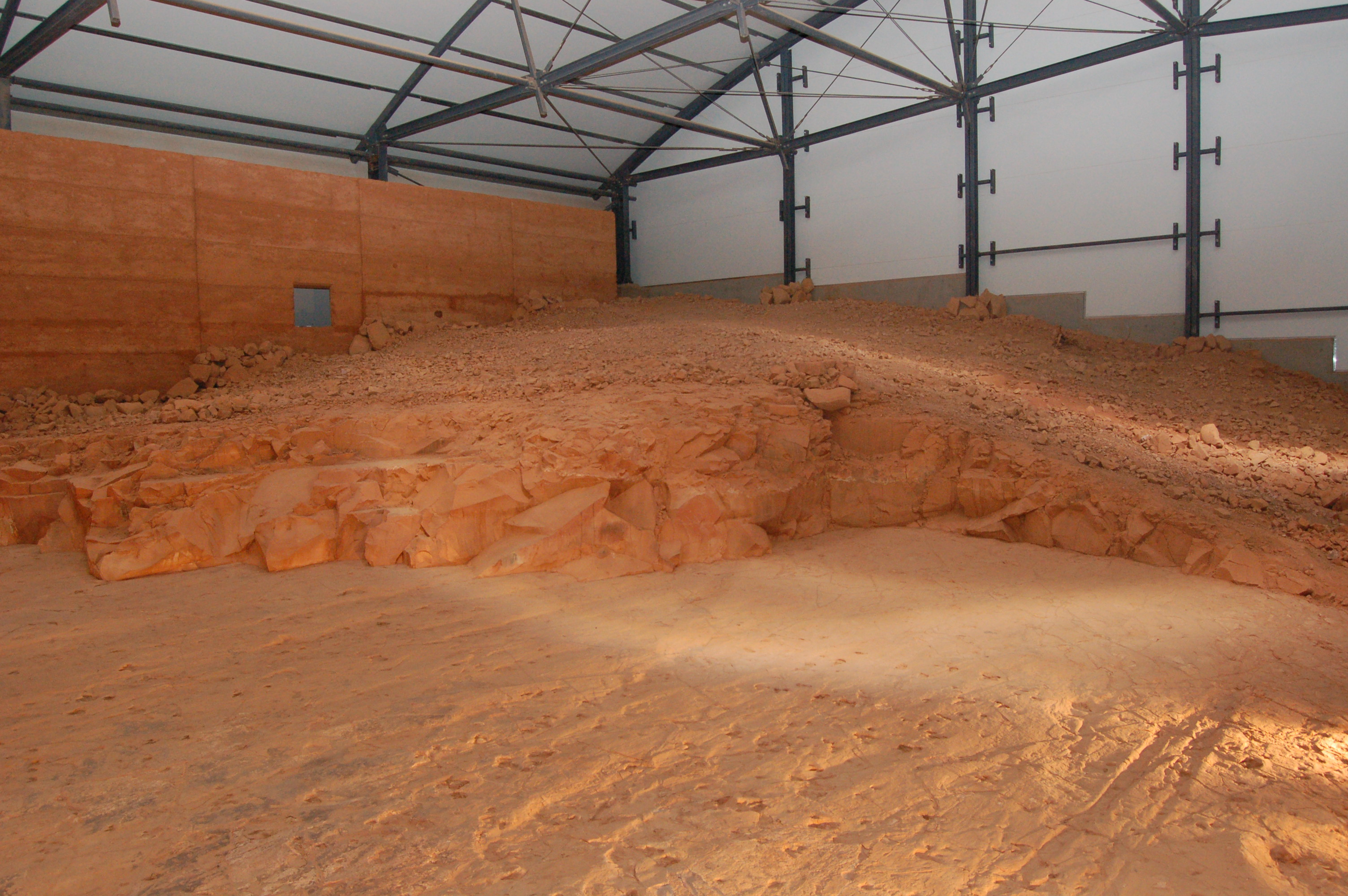
Wide-angle photo showing some of the overburden which has been cleared and in the foreground are the dinosaur tracks.

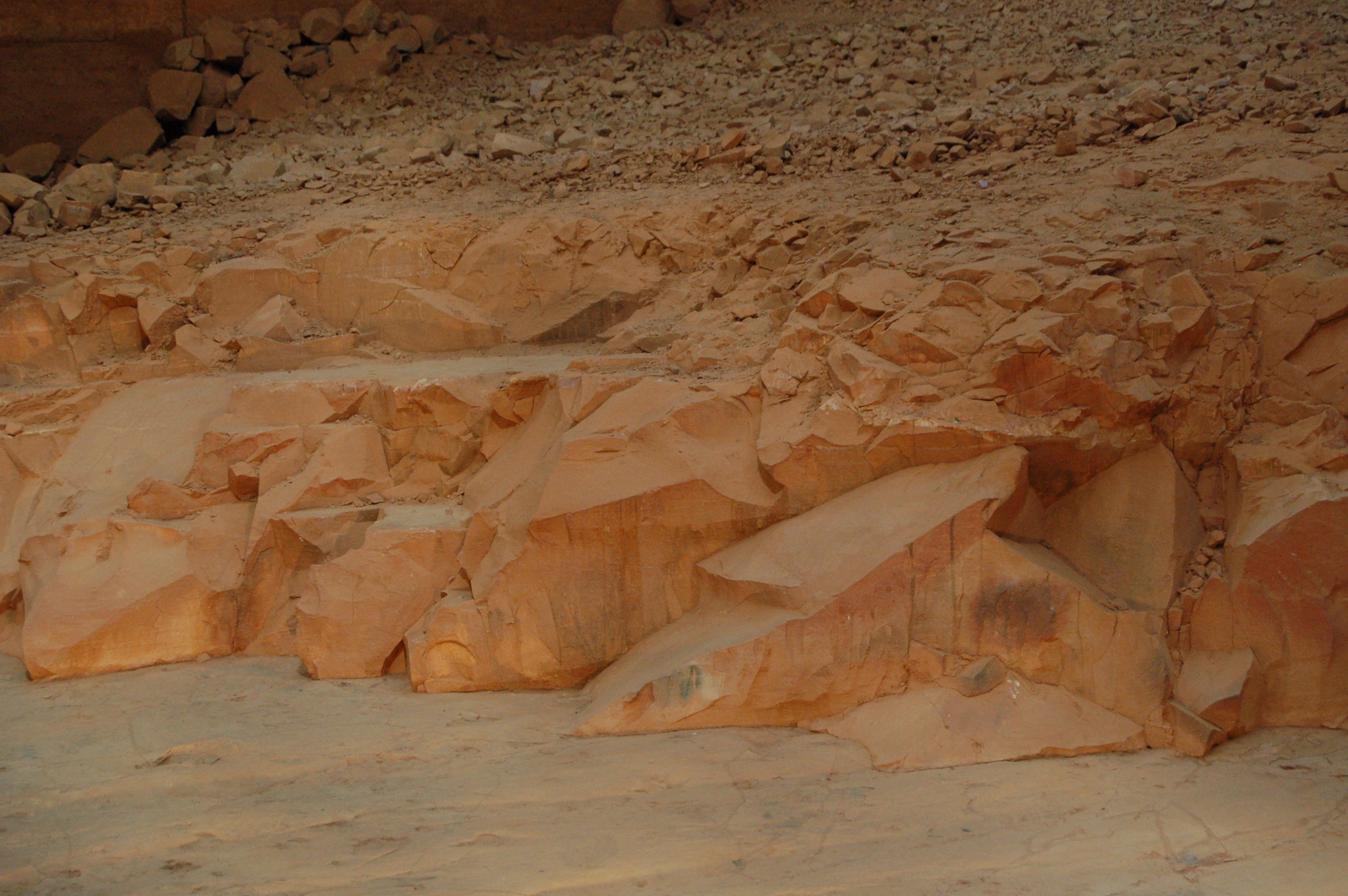
Close-up of the overburden that covered the dinosaur tracks.

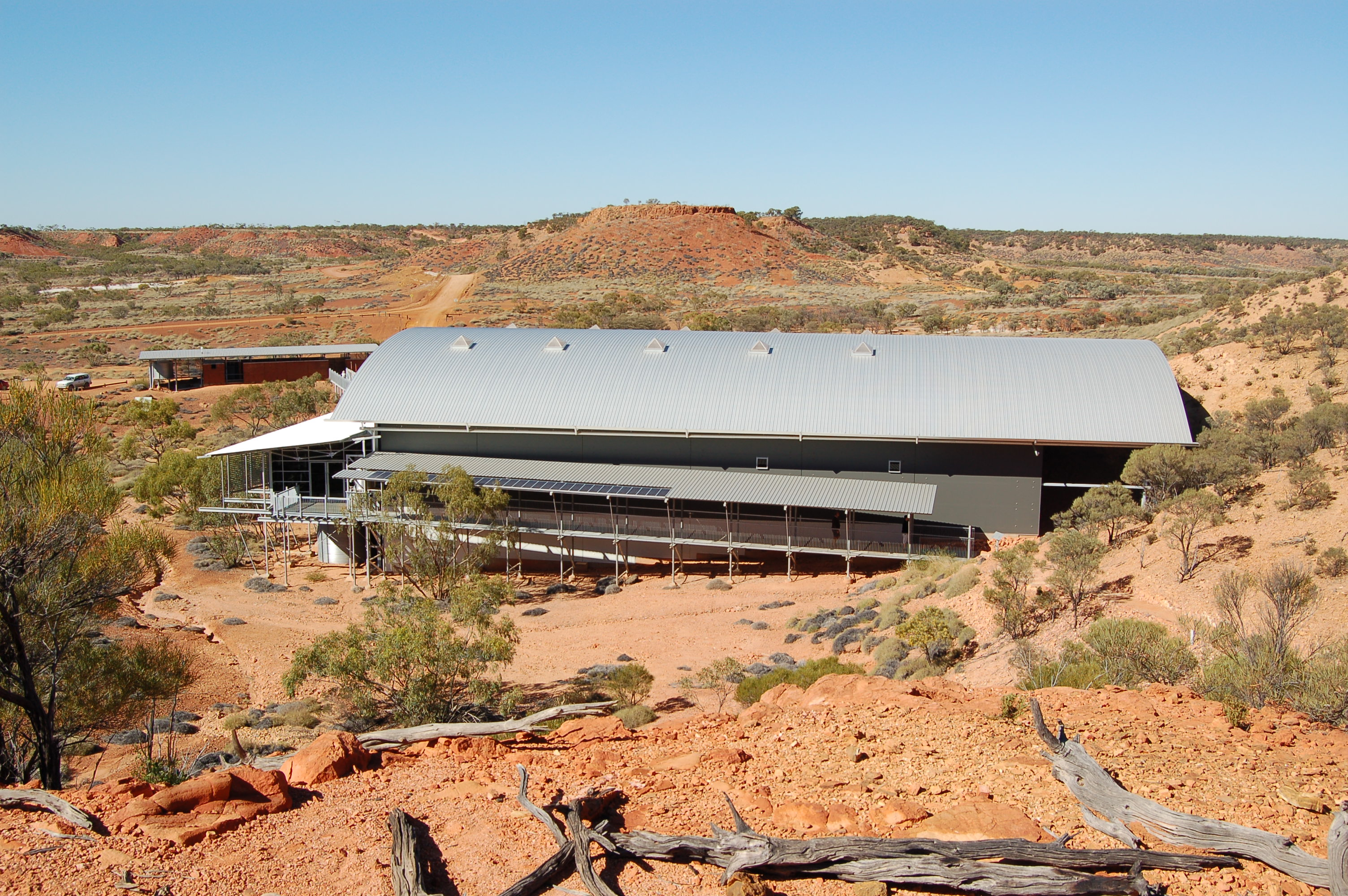
External view of Conservation Building at Lark Quarry.

Dinosaur Stampede National Monument at Lark Quarry Conservation Park (also known just as Lark Quarry or Dinosaur Stampede) in Queensland, Australia is considered to be the site of the world's only known record of a dinosaur stampede, with fossilised footprints are interpreted as a predator stalking and causing a stampede of around 150 two-legged dinosaurs. This interpretation has been challenged in recent years, with evidence suggesting it may have been a natural river crossing.

The fossils date to either the Albian or Turonian periods between 104 and 92 million years ago, and are part of the Winton Formation sandstone. In 2015, Winton Shire Council invited the Australian Age of Dinosaurs Museum of Natural History to take over the operation of public guided tours at Dinosaur Stampede National Monument. This joint initiative, implemented in April 2016, provides visitors with a broader understanding of unique Australian dinosaurs and the world they inhabited. In 2022, Dinosaur Stampede National Monument received 17,521 visitors.

The Lark Quarry site is about 110 km (68 mi) south-west of the western Queensland town of Winton.

== Origin ==
The traditional account is that 104 to 92 million years ago, a group of perhaps 180 chicken-sized coelurosaurs and Bantam to emu-sized ornithopods were disturbed by the arrival of a single much larger theropod, perhaps Australovenator or a related form, which may have been up to 6 metres long with 50-centimetre feet. The two smaller track types are placed within their own ichnotaxa Skartopus (small coelurosaurs) and Wintonopus (ornithopods), while the larger tracks were referred to cf. Tyrannosauropus and originally interpreted as a large theropod.

The Skartopus and Wintonopus trackmakers were thought to have stampeded past the cf. Tyrannosauropus trackmaker (that walked in the opposite direction), leaving thousands of footprints in lake sediment. However, in 1994 the ichnotaxon Tyrannosauropus were identified as large plant-eater dinosaur tracks, and when combined with analyses to distinguish three-toed carnivore and herbivore dinosaur footprints the large tracks attributed to Tyrannosauropus at Lark Quarry were interpreted as being produced by a large herbivore similar to Muttaburrasaurus, rather than by a predatory theropod, and were suggested to belong to the ichnogenus Amblydactylus instead.

Research by Dr Anthony Romilio from The University of Queensland and colleagues casts doubt on the original interpretation. Analysis of the sediments indicates that they were deposited by a seasonal water course with water flowing at different depths and speeds at different times. The footprints were most likely made over a period of time, perhaps several days, by dinosaurs crossing the channel. The authors also found the shape variation of Skartopus and Wintonopus overlapped and were even preserved within the same individual trackway. With no significant difference in the form of the footprints, the authors attributed both Skartopus and Wintonopus were made by the same type of herbivorous bipedal dinosaur trackmakers.

Whatever actually took place, not long after the incident, the water level began to rise, covering the tracks with sandy sediments before the mud had dried. The footprints were buried beneath sand and mud as the water levels continued to rise and fall. Over thousands of millennia, the rich river plain with sandy channels, swamps and lush lowland forest dried up. The sediment covering the footprints was compressed to form rock.

== Discovery and preservation ==
The footprints were first discovered in the 1960s by station manager, Glen Seymour, in the nearby Seymour Quarry.

Palaeontologists from the Queensland Museum, including Mary Wade and Tony Thulborn and the University of Queensland excavated Lark Quarry during 1976–77 (the quarry was named after Malcolm Lark, a volunteer who removed a lot of the overlying rock.) All together they removed more than 60 tonnes of rock, and uncovered about 200 square metres of the layer with the fossils. This shows about 3300 dinosaur footprints.

A sheltering roof was built over the site but did not stop the gradual damage caused by exposure to the weather. The present Conservation Building that covers the trackways was constructed in 2002. This building protects the main collection of footprints from damage by stabilising temperature and humidity fluctuations, stops water running over the footprints and keeps people and wildlife off the footprints themselves.

The Dinosaur Stampede National Monument was included in the Australian National Heritage List on 20 July 2004, for values of rarity and research.

It has been claimed that the Lark Quarry tracks served as inspiration and "scientific underpinning" for the Gallimimus stampede scene in the film Jurassic Park; these tracks were initially interpreted as representing a dinosaur stampede caused by the arrival of a theropod predator. The idea that the tracks represent a stampede has since been contested, and a consultant to Jurassic Park has denied the tracks served as inspiration for the movie.

In 2025, Dr Anthony Romilio use Lark Quarry as a test-case to demonstrate digital approaches to evaluating [dinosaur] tracksites. Included was the first accurate measurement of the in situ track surface exposed surface area (210 square metres) and the actual number of footprints on that surface (at least 3,436 footprints). These measurements do not include the myriad pieces that have been removed from the site (e.g., museum displays elsewhere). The research provided the density of Lark Quarry footprints to be 16.36 footprints per square metres. This is extraordinary high concentration of fossil dinosaur footprints, although it is not the highest known in Australia. For example, the Early Jurassic aged dinosaur footprints from the Precipice Sandstone include specimen blocks with over 70 footprints per square metre.

== See also ==
- List of fossil sites
- Protected areas of Queensland
