= Amblydactylus =

Trace fossil classification
- Kingdom: Animalia
- Phylum: Chordata
- Class: Reptilia
- Clade: Dinosauria
- Clade: †Ornithischia
- Clade: †Ornithopoda
- Ichnogenus: †Amblydactylus; Sternberg, 1932

Type ichnospecies
- †Amblydactylus gethingi Sternberg, 1932

Ichnospecies
- †Amblydactylus gethingi Sternberg, 1932; †Amblydactylus kortmeyeri Currie & Sarjent, 1979

Dinosaur trace fossil

Amblydactylus is an ichnogenus that has been attributed to dinosaurs. The generic name, derived from the Greek words amblys and dáktylos, means "dull finger". Two species of Amlydactylus have been named: A. gethingi, which references the Gething Formation where it was found; and A. kortmeyeri, which honours Carl kortmeyer who discovered the holotype.

Large dinosaur tracks in the Winton Formation of Queensland, Australia, at the Lark Quarry trackway, were previously identified as cf. Tyrannosauropus and were as such interpreted as belonging to a large theropod. However, Tyrannosauropus has since been declared a nomen dubium and the referred tracks likely belonged to hadrosaurid ornithopods. Similarly, the large Lark Quarry footprints are also now suggested to belong to an ornithopod, and are most similar to Amblydactylus gethingi, with the suggested referral of Amblydactylus cf. gethingi.

== See also ==
- List of dinosaur ichnogenera
- Ichnology
