= List of pathological dinosaur specimens =

This list of pathological dinosaur specimens enumerates those fossil dinosaur specimens that preserve evidence of injury, disease, deformity or parasitic infection.

== Ankylosauria ==
Nickname	Catalogue number	Institution	Taxon	Age	Unit	Country	Notes	Images
	DMNH 65883		Gastonia new species					

== Ceratopsians ==
Nickname	Catalogue number	Institution	Taxon	Age	Unit	Country	Notes	Images
N/A	CMN 41357	Canadian Museum of Nature	Vagaceratops irvinensis	Campanian	Dinosaur Park Formation	Canada	A smooth depression set into a patch of wrinkly-textured bone above the right eye and the squamosal bone, probably due to advanced age. This individuals neck exhibits extensive bony growth with a "cauliflower" texture fusing the fifth through 9th vertebrae and their ribs. Rega, Holmes, and Tirabasso have hypothesized that this growth was a chondrosarcoma resulting from several osteochondromas occurring there. They also identified a benign osteoma in the fourth toe of the right hind foot. They also found lesions and bony growths deforming the animal's first right metacarpal.	The skull of CMN 41357.
N/A	ROM 843	Royal Ontario Museum	Chasmosaurus belli			Canada	The skull of ROM 843 exhibits resorption of bone both near the eye-horns and on the frill, thought to be signs of aging. It also has bony growths on its fourth right metacarpal and on its eighth and ninth body ribs. However, the most important pathology are the many lesions covering the animal's thumbs. These lesions give the bone a very rough texture and deform the digits. The right thumb was the most severely deformed and is bent at a 42 degree angle, while the left thumb was bent 20 degrees away from healthy alignment.	
N/A	TMP 79.11.9	Royal Tyrrell Museum of Paleontology	Centrosaurus			Canada	An unidentifiable skull bone from this specimen seems to have been "[d]iseased".	
N/A	TMP 82.18.227	Royal Tyrrell Museum of Paleontology	Centrosaurus			Canada	A round exostosis formed on the shaft of this specimen's ulna.	
N/A	TMP 85.112.39	Royal Tyrrell Museum of Paleontology	Pachyrhinosaurus n. sp.	Campanian	Wapiti Formation	Canada	One of the rearward left dorsal ribs has a false joint.	
N/A	TMP 85.112.52	Royal Tyrrell Museum of Paleontology	Pachyrhinosaurus n. sp.	Campanian	Wapiti Formation	Canada	This animal seems to have broken the shaft of one of its middle ribs and a bony callus formed there.	
N/A	TMP 85.112.70	Royal Tyrrell Museum of Paleontology	Pachyrhinosaurus n. sp.	Campanian	Wapiti Formation	Canada	This specimen developed a stress fracture in one of its phalanges.	
N/A	TMP 85.112.86	Royal Tyrrell Museum of Paleontology	Pachyrhinosaurus n. sp.	Campanian	Wapiti Formation	Canada	One of this specimen's ribs had a false joint.	
N/A	TMP 86.55.111	Royal Tyrrell Museum of Paleontology	Pachyrhinosaurus n. sp.	Campanian	Wapiti Formation	Canada	A rounded growth of unknown origins projects from the underside of this specimen's squamosal bone. Tanke and Rothschild failed to determine its cause, but hypothesized that it might be the result of an avulsion injury.	
N/A	TMP 86.55.304	Royal Tyrrell Museum of Paleontology	Pachyrhinosaurus n. sp.	Campanian	Wapiti Formation	Canada	The jugal and epijugal of this specimen bear a 2 cm wide round hole, although Tanke and Rothschild have considered that this hole may have formed as a result of non-pathological processes.	
N/A	TMP 87.18.27	Royal Tyrrell Museum of Paleontology	Centrosaurus			Canada	One of this specimen's vertebrae is deformed.	
N/A	TMP 87.55.90	Royal Tyrrell Museum of Paleontology	Pachyrhinosaurus n. sp.	Campanian	Wapiti Formation	Canada	One of this animal's rear right dorsal ribs was broken twice. One of the fractures formed a false joint.	
N/A	TMP 87.55.101	Royal Tyrrell Museum of Paleontology	Pachyrhinosaurus n. sp.	Campanian	Wapiti Formation	Canada	The left quadrate of this animal is concave where it should be convex, bears a bone spur, and has a 2 cm long rounded pit.	
N/A	TMP 87.55.102	Royal Tyrrell Museum of Paleontology	Pachyrhinosaurus n. sp.	Campanian	Wapiti Formation	Canada	Four of the vertebrae near the tip of this animal's tail fused together.	
N/A	TMP 87.55.190	Royal Tyrrell Museum of Paleontology	Pachyrhinosaurus n. sp.	Campanian	Wapiti Formation	Canada	This animal had two oval-shaped lesions on its left shoulder blade.	
N/A	TMP 87.55.210	Royal Tyrrell Museum of Paleontology	Pachyrhinosaurus n. sp.	Campanian	Wapiti Formation	Canada	This animal broke the rear part of the left side of its frill area and lost the spike there. The frill healed in a deformed asymmetrical manner.	
N/A	TMP 88.55.52	Royal Tyrrell Museum of Paleontology	Pachyrhinosaurus n. sp.	Campanian	Wapiti Formation	Canada	One of this animal's neck vertebrae exhibited several pathologies. This vertebra had deformed prezygapophyses, a bone spure on its centrum and the rear surface of its end plat Tanke and Rothschild characterized as having a "'moth-eaten' appearance".	
N/A	TMP 88.55.90	Royal Tyrrell Museum of Paleontology	Pachyrhinosaurus n. sp.	Campanian	Wapiti Formation	Canada	This animal's parietal bar was eroded, possibly due to osteomyelitis.	
N/A	TMP 88.55.191	Royal Tyrrell Museum of Paleontology	Pachyrhinosaurus n. sp.	Campanian	Wapiti Formation	Canada	This animal had a "healing" fracture in one of its rear right dorsal ribs.	
N/A	TMP 89.18.108	Royal Tyrrell Museum of Paleontology	Centrosaurus			Canada	This animal broke one of its fibulae, which healed to form a false joint.	
N/A	TMP 89.55.63	Royal Tyrrell Museum of Paleontology	Pachyrhinosaurus n. sp.	Campanian	Wapiti Formation	Canada	The neck of one of this specimen's ribs had a "healing" fracture.	
N/A	TMP 89.55.125	Royal Tyrrell Museum of Paleontology	Pachyrhinosaurus n. sp.	Campanian	Wapiti Formation	Canada	This animal fractured the rear part of its parietal and a false joint formed there.	
N/A	TMP 89.55.205	Royal Tyrrell Museum of Paleontology	Pachyrhinosaurus n. sp.	Campanian	Wapiti Formation	Canada	One of this specimens left rear dorsal ribs has a false joint.	
N/A	TMP 89.55.188	Royal Tyrrell Museum of Paleontology	Pachyrhinosaurus n. sp.	Campanian	Wapiti Formation	Canada	The beak of this specimen is missing the rounded notch seen in most Pachyrhinosaurus. According to Tanke and Rothschild, this absence may not necessarily be due to pathology, however.	
N/A	TMP 89.55.269	Royal Tyrrell Museum of Paleontology	Pachyrhinosaurus n. sp.	Campanian	Wapiti Formation	Canada	The cortex of this animal's postorbital bone was deeply infolded near the animal's forehead.	
N/A	TMP 89.55.287	Royal Tyrrell Museum of Paleontology	Pachyrhinosaurus n. sp.	Campanian	Wapiti Formation	Canada	The neural spine of one of the vertebrae mid-length down the animal's tail was fractured. The bone around the fractured area was also eroded.	
N/A	TMP 89.55.363	Royal Tyrrell Museum of Paleontology	Pachyrhinosaurus n. sp.	Campanian	Wapiti Formation	Canada	A vertebra near the base of the tail had a fractured neural spine.	
N/A	TMP 89.55.389	Royal Tyrrell Museum of Paleontology	Pachyrhinosaurus n. sp.	Campanian	Wapiti Formation	Canada	One of this animal's left rear dorsal ribs was fractured.	
N/A	TMP 89.55.464	Royal Tyrrell Museum of Paleontology	Pachyrhinosaurus n. sp.	Campanian	Wapiti Formation	Canada	The underside of one of its left dorsal ribs was swollen.	
N/A	TMP 89.55.719	Royal Tyrrell Museum of Paleontology	Pachyrhinosaurus n. sp.	Campanian	Wapiti Formation	Canada	A bony callus grew at the site of a fractured rib in this specimen.	
N/A	TMP 89.55.883	Royal Tyrrell Museum of Paleontology	Pachyrhinosaurus n. sp.	Campanian	Wapiti Formation	Canada	This animal had a small, round exostosis on its parietal bone.	
N/A	TMP 89.55.899	Royal Tyrrell Museum of Paleontology	Pachyrhinosaurus n. sp.	Campanian	Wapiti Formation	Canada	This Pachyrhinosaurus had an unusually shaped nasal boss. Tanke and Rothschild could not confirm that this trait was due to pathological causes.	
N/A	TMP 89.55.978	Royal Tyrrell Museum of Paleontology	Pachyrhinosaurus n. sp.	Campanian	Wapiti Formation	Canada	This animal had a neck vertebra whose neural arch failed to fuse to its centrum as the animal grew. Further, this vertebra's right prezygapophysis was "misshapen".	
N/A	TMP 89.55.1072	Royal Tyrrell Museum of Paleontology	Pachyrhinosaurus n. sp.	Campanian	Wapiti Formation	Canada	This animal's right quadrate was cracked and had a pit near the bone's medial condyle.	
N/A	TMP 89.55.1085	Royal Tyrrell Museum of Paleontology	Pachyrhinosaurus n. sp.	Campanian	Wapiti Formation	Canada	The rear of this animal's parietal is asymmetrical and the third parietal spike is curved upwards instead of outwards.	
N/A	TMP 89.55.1091	Royal Tyrrell Museum of Paleontology	Pachyrhinosaurus n. sp.	Campanian	Wapiti Formation	Canada	This specimen's epijugal and jugal bore a pit. Tanke and Rothschild could not confirm that this pit was pathological, however.	
N/A	TMP 89.55.1234	Royal Tyrrell Museum of Paleontology	Pachyrhinosaurus n. sp.	Campanian	Wapiti Formation	Canada	This specimen was afflicted by several pathologies of its skull. One was a "large hole" located in below and in front of the right eye. There was also a short round growth on the left branch of the maxilla and lesions on the left squamosal.	
N/A	TMP 89.55.1300	Royal Tyrrell Museum of Paleontology	Pachyrhinosaurus n. sp.	Campanian	Wapiti Formation	Canada	This specimen had a bony lump on the underside of one of its rear left dorsal ribs' necks.	
N/A	TMP 89.55.1503	Royal Tyrrell Museum of Paleontology	Pachyrhinosaurus n. sp.	Campanian	Wapiti Formation	Canada	The horns on the rear edge of the right parietal were larger and curved in a different direction than those on the left side. Tanke and Rothschild suggested that this asymmetry may just be an anatomical idiosyncrasy of this individual animal rather than a pathology.	
N/A	TMP 89.55.1541	Royal Tyrrell Museum of Paleontology	Pachyrhinosaurus n. sp.	Campanian	Wapiti Formation	Canada	This specimen had a "[s]mall rounded exostosis" on its parietal.	
N/A	TMP 90.18.1	Royal Tyrrell Museum of Paleontology	Centrosaurus			Canada	A thin callus of bone formed on one of this specimen's ribs.	
N/A	TMP 91.18.18	Royal Tyrrell Museum of Paleontology	Centrosaurus			Canada	This specimen has a lesion on its left squamosal bone.	
N/A	TMP 91.18.30	Royal Tyrrell Museum of Paleontology	Centrosaurus			Canada	The far end of one of this specimen's phalanges is covered in pits.	
N/A	TMP 91.18.31	Royal Tyrrell Museum of Paleontology	Centrosaurus			Canada	One of this specimens rear dorsal ribs has a callus that formed at the site of a fracture.	
N/A	TMP 91.18.77	Royal Tyrrell Museum of Paleontology	Centrosaurus			Canada	One of this specimen's rear ribs has a large false joint.	
						Canada	An isolated ceratopsian neck vertebra with healed fracture.	
	DMNH D2596	Dalian Museum of Natural History	Psittacosaurus	Aptian	Yixian Formation	China		
	JZMP-V-11		Psittacosaurus					

== Sauropodomorphs ==
Nickname	Catalogue number	Institution	Taxon	Age	Unit	Country	Notes	Images
N/A	DMNH 2908	Denver Museum of Natural History	Camarasaurus grandis	Late Jurassic	Morrison Formation	United States	The right humerus of this animal exhibits a spur-like lesion resulting from the healing process following a "stress injury or repetitive overexertion of the muscles resulting in an avulsion". This spur-like lesion would have caused long term fasciitis and myosistis.	
			Bonitasaura salgadoi					
	MCS-PV 183							

== Stegosaurs ==
Nickname	Catalogue number	Institution	Taxon	Age	Unit	Country	Notes	Images
N/A	DMNH 2818	Denver Museum of Natural History	Stegosaurus stenops	Late Jurassic	Morrison Formation	United States		
N/A	USNM 6646	US National Museum	Stegosaurus ungulatus	Late Jurassic	Morrison Formation	United States		

== Theropods ==
Nickname	Catalogue number	Institution	Taxon	Age	Unit	Country	Notes	Images
N/A	PVSJ 407	Museo de Ciencias Naturales, Universidad Nacional de San Juan	Herrerasaurus ischigualastensis					
N/A	USMN 4735	US National Museum	Ceratosaurus nasicornis					
N/A	UCMP 37302	University of California Museum of Paleontology	Dilophosaurus wetherilli					
N/A	IVPP 84019		Monolophosaurus jiangi					
N/A	USNM 4734		Allosaurus fragilis					
N/A	USNM 8367							
N/A	UUVP 1847	Utah Museum of Natural History	Allosaurus fragilis					
N/A	UUVP 2252	Utah Museum of Natural History	Allosaurus fragilis					
N/A	UUVP 3435	Utah Museum of Natural History	Allosaurus fragilis					
N/A	UUVP 687	Utah Museum of Natural History	Allosaurus fragilis					
N/A	UUVP 1848	Utah Museum of Natural History	Allosaurus fragilis					
N/A	UUVP 4159	Utah Museum of Natural History	Allosaurus fragilis					
N/A	UUVP 1742	Utah Museum of Natural History	Allosaurus fragilis					
N/A	UUVP 4895	Utah Museum of Natural History	Allosaurus fragilis					
N/A	UUVP 3773	Utah Museum of Natural History	Allosaurus fragilis					
N/A	UUVP 5256	Utah Museum of Natural History	Allosaurus fragilis					
N/A	UUVP 3811	Utah Museum of Natural History	Allosaurus fragilis					
N/A	UUVP 177	Utah Museum of Natural History	Allosaurus fragilis					
N/A	UUVP 1849	Utah Museum of Natural History	Allosaurus fragilis					
N/A	UUVP 1850	Utah Museum of Natural History	Allosaurus fragilis					
N/A	UUVP 837	Utah Museum of Natural History	Allosaurus fragilis					
N/A	UUVP 1851	Utah Museum of Natural History	Allosaurus fragilis					
N/A	UUVP 1657	Utah Museum of Natural History	Allosaurus fragilis					
N/A	UUVP 1528	Utah Museum of Natural History	Allosaurus fragilis					
N/A	UUVP 5599	Utah Museum of Natural History	Allosaurus fragilis					
N/A	UUVP 1852	Utah Museum of Natural History	Allosaurus fragilis					
N/A	UUVP 1853	Utah Museum of Natural History	Allosaurus fragilis					
N/A	UUVP 1854	Utah Museum of Natural History	Allosaurus fragilis					
N/A	UUVP 1855	Utah Museum of Natural History	Allosaurus fragilis					
N/A	YPM 4944		Allosaurus fragilis					
N/A	MOR 693		Allosaurus fragilis					
N/A	MIWG 6348		Neovenator salerii					
N/A	BMNH R10001		Neovenator salerii					
N/A	IVPP 10600		Sinraptor dongi					
N/A	OMNH 8-0-59		Acrocanthosaurus atokensis					
N/A	SMU 74646							
N/A	SGM-Din 1		Carcharodontosaurus saharicus					
N/A	YPM 5205		Deinonychus antirrhopus					
N/A	IGM 100/976		Velociraptor mongoliensis					
N/A	IGM 100/979							
N/A	ZPALNo.MgD-I/6		Deinocheirus mirificus					
N/A	TMP 79.8.1	Royal Tyrrell Museum of Paleontology	Latenivenatrix mcmasterae					
N/A	ROM 807		Albertosaurus sarcophagus					
N/A	NMC 8506		Daspletosaurus torosus					
N/A	NMC 2120		Gorgosaurus libratus					
N/A	TMP91.36.500		Gorgosaurus libratus					
N/A	AMNH 5027		Tyrannosaurus rex					
N/A	LACM 23844		Tyrannosaurus rex					
N/A	MOR 008		Tyrannosaurus rex					
Stan	BHI-3033		Tyrannosaurus rex					
	UUVP 2742		Marshosaurus bicentesimus					
Sue	FMNH PR2081	Field Museum of Natural History	Tyrannosaurus rex	Maastrichtian	Hell Creek Formation	United States	Sue the T. rex, also known as FMNH PR2081, suffered an avulsion that left a divot and hook-shaped bone spur on "her" right humerus. The divot appears to be located at the origin of the deltoid or teres major muscles. Some experts have hypothesized that gout caused the formation of small patches of eroded bone discovered on Sue's first and second metacarpals. Five other pathologies have been documented in Sue; a pathology on each side of its skull, a twisted and discolored tooth, two pathological tail vertebrae in series, and a broken and healed fibula with associated abnormal bone growth.	Sue.
