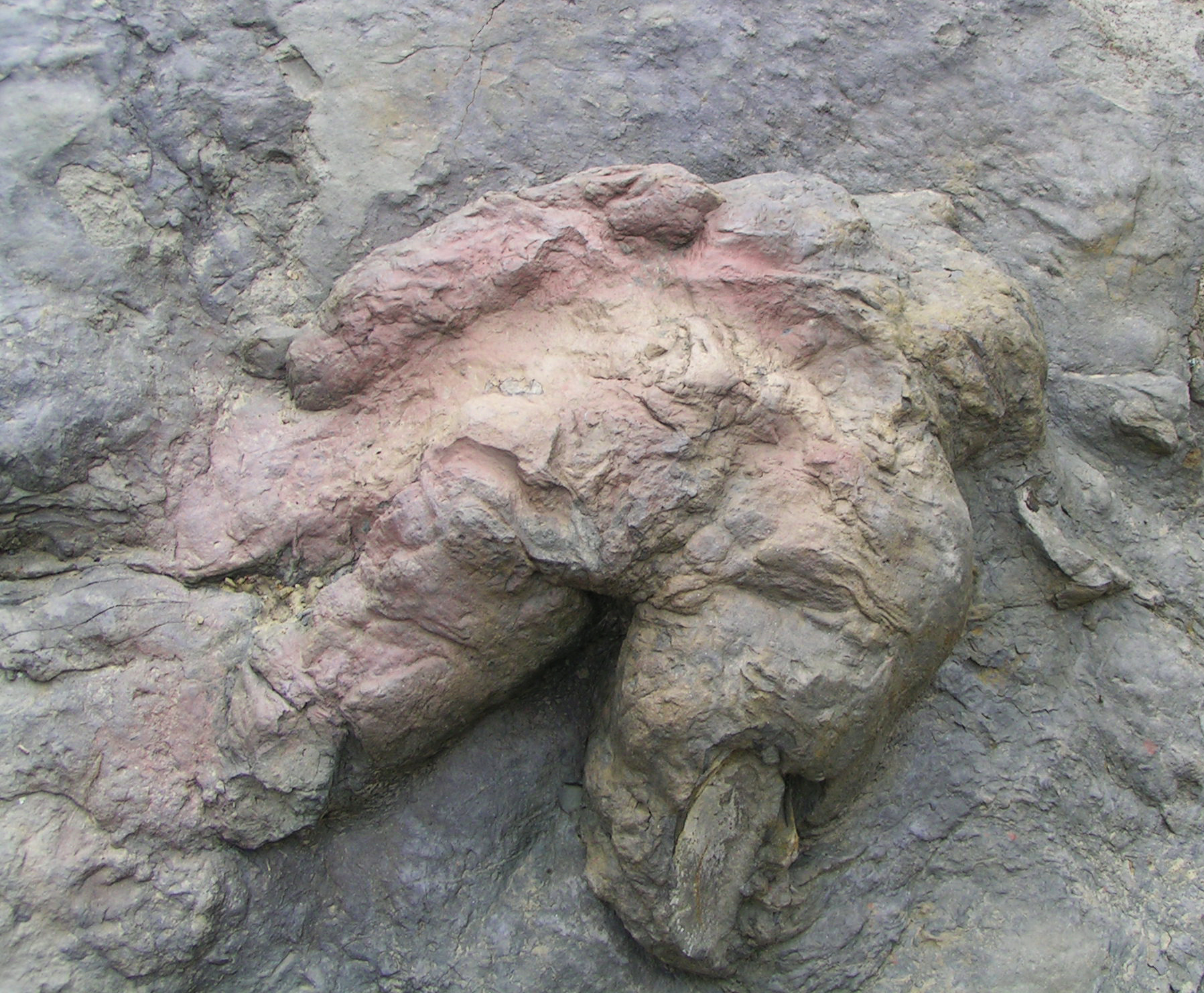
- Tyrannosauripus pillmorei, probable Tyrannosaurus footprint from Philmont Scout Ranch, New Mexico

Trace fossil classification
- Ichnofamily: Tyrannosauripodidae
- Ichnogenus: Tyrannosauripus; Lockley & Hunt, 1994

Type ichnospecies
- Tyrannosauripus pillmorei Lockley & Hunt, 1994

= Tyrannosauripus =

Tyrannosauripus Temporal range: Maastrichtian

Dinosaur footprint

Tyrannosauripus is an ichnogenus of dinosaur footprint.

== Description ==
In 1983, geologist Charles "Chuck" Pillmore discovered a fossil footprint.

In 1994, Martin Lockley and Adrian Hunt formally described the footprint.

This fossil footprint from northern New Mexico (within the Philmont Scout Ranch boundary) is 86 cm (34 in) long by 64 cm (25 in) wide.

Given its Late Cretaceous age (about 66 million years old), the footprint likely belonged to the giant theropod dinosaur Tyrannosaurus rex.

In 2016, the size of the individual dinosaur was estimated at 11.4 meters (37 ft) meters and 5.8–6.9 tonnes (6.4–7.6 short tons).

== Background ==
In 1971, similar tridactyl dinosaur tracks in North America were discovered earlier and named Tyrannosauropus, but they were later recognized as hadrosaurid tracks and their description deemed inadequate, with Tyrannosauropus regarded as a nomen dubium. True footprints likely from Tyrannosaurus would not be found until the discovery of Tyrannosauripus.

In 2007, a large tyrannosaurid track was found also in eastern Montana (Hell Creek Formation).

In 2016, a probable fossil trackway of Tyrannosaurus was discovered in Wyoming (Lance Formation).

In 2026, the discovery of a set of four Tyrannosauripus footprints that constitute a 7 m (23 ft) trackway was published. The footprints were uncovered in 2025 from the upper Hell Creek Formation in Marmarth, North Dakota by a high school teacher named Kent M. Hups (who would co-author the discovery), and are preserved as calcium carbonate-cemented sandstone casts left behind when the softer rock around them eroded. The size of the tracks and the age of the formation indicates the tracks were likely made by an adult Tyrannosaurus rex., as each track is roughly 1 meter (3.3 ft) long. The stride length is estimated to have been 4 m (13 ft), suggesting a speed of 1.5–2 meters per second (4.9–6.6 ft/s; 3.4–4.5 mph). The lack of footprints potentially attributable to Tyrannosaurus may be a result of the fluvial environments in which the theropod lived, resulting in most footprints being washed away.

== See also ==
- Dinosaur
- Ichnogenus
