= Wapiti Formation =

Stratigraphic Unit in Canada

- Stratigraphic range: Campanian–Maastrichtian
- Type: Geological formation

Lithology
- Primary: Sandstone, siltstone, mudstone
- Other: conglomerate, coal

Location
- Region: Alberta
- Country: Canada

Type section
- Named for: Lower part of Wapiti River
- Named by: G.M. Dawson, 1881.

The Wapiti Formation is a geological formation of the Western Canada Sedimentary Basin in northwestern Alberta, and northeastern British Columbia, Canada. Its deposition spanned the time interval from the upper Campanian through to the lower Maastrichtian, between approximately 80 and 68 Ma. It was named by G.M. Dawson in 1881, presumably for exposures along the lower part of the Wapiti River and downstream along the Smoky River in Alberta.

Dinosaur remains are among the fossils that have been recovered from the Cretaceous portion of the formation. The Wapiti Formation does not produce many fossils due to its limited surface exposure and accessibility, although two Pachyrhinosaurus bone beds have been productive. Plant fossils and trace fossils have been unearthed here too.

== Lithology ==
The Wapiti Formation consists of interbedded sandstones, siltstones, shales and mudstones, with thin conglomerates, coal seams and bentonite beds. The sandstones are typically thick, pale grey, crossbedded and bentonitic. The middle part contains less sandstones, more mudstones, and fewer and thinner coals. The upper part contains thicker lenticular sandstones and more coals.

== Depositional environment ==
The Wapiti Formation was deposited in inland fluvial and floodplain environments, with local areas of lacustrine sediments. The sandstones were deposited mainly in fluvial channel environments, with siltstones, carbonaceous shales and coals accumulating in overbank settings.

== Thickness and Distribution ==
The Wapiti Formation rests conformably on the marine shales of the Smoky Group. It is more than 1,300 m (4,300 ft) thick in the foothills of the Canadian Rockies in the west, and it thins eastward to its erosional edge. It is correlative with the entire sequence of the Belly River Group, Bearpaw Formation, Edmonton Group and Scollard Formation in south-central Alberta. In most areas it is unconformably overlain by glacial and post-glacial sediments of Quaternary age, or exposed at surface. In a few upland areas it is unconformably overlain by Paleogene gravel deposits.

== Vertebrate paleofauna ==
Color key: Taxon / Reclassified taxon / Taxon falsely reported as present / Dubious taxon or junior synonym / Ichnotaxon / Ootaxon / Morphotaxon	Notes; Uncertain or tentative taxa are in small text; ~~crossed out~~ taxa are discredited.

Indeterminate ankylosaurids, albertosaurines, pachycephalosaurids, ornithomimids, lambeosaurs, and saurolophines are known from Alberta. Corythosaurus is also known from the formation.

Dinosaurs of the Wapiti Formation
Genus	Species	Location	Member	Material	Notes	Images
cf. Albertosaurus	Indeterminate	British Columbia		Teeth		
Gorgosaurus	G. libratus	British Columbia	Approximately near the top of Unit 2 or base of Unit 3	Natural mold of partial skull		
cf. Gorgosaurus	Indeterminate	Alberta		Teeth		
Bellatoripes	B. fredlundi	Alberta	Unit 4	Three trackways and an isolated print.	Footprints of large tyrannosaurids.	
cf. Haenamichnus	cf. H. isp.	Alberta	Unit 4	An isolated track.	Footprint of large azhdarchid pterosaur.	
Boreonykus	B. certekorum	Alberta	Unit 3			Boreonykus certekorum
Troodon	Indeterminate	Alberta	Units 3 and 4	Teeth; probable troodontid footprints are also known		
Edmontosaurus?	E. sp.	Alberta	Unit 4		Mummified specimen (UALVP 53722); originally referred to E. regalis	
Hadrosauridae nov. tax.	sp. nov.	British Columbia			A new taxon of hadrosaurid.	
Pachyrhinosaurus	P. lakustai	Alberta				Pachyrhinosaurus lakustai
Richardoestesia	R. gilmorei	Alberta				
Saurornitholestes	S. sp.	Alberta				

== See also ==
- List of dinosaur-bearing stratigraphic units
