= Campgaw =

Campgaw may refer to the following in the U.S. state of New Jersey:

- Campgaw, New Jersey, an unincorporated community in Franklin Lakes, Bergen County
- Campgaw Mountain, the northernmost ridge of the volcanically formed Watchung Mountains
- Campgaw Mountain Reservation, a county park in Bergen County
