= Goffle Hill =

Mountain range in New Jersey, USA

- Watchung Mountains
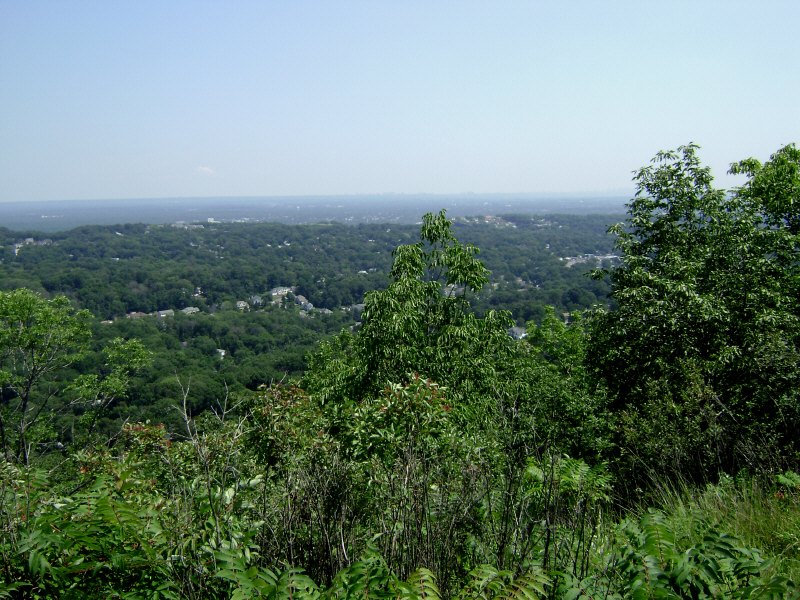
- The western flank of Goffle Hill is seen from High Mountain in Wayne, New Jersey.

Highest point
- Elevation: 602 ft (183 m)
- Coordinates: 40°58′33.81″N 74°10′07.93″W

Dimensions
- Length: 6 mi (9.7 km) north–south

Geography
- Country: United States of America
- State: New Jersey

Geology
- Rock ages: Triassic and Jurassic
- Rock types: extrusive igneous and trap rock

Goffle Hill, also referred to as Goffle Mountain and historically known as Totoway Mountain and Wagaraw Mountain, is a range of the trap rock Watchung Mountains on the western edge of the Newark Basin in northern New Jersey. The hill straddles part of the border of Bergen County and Passaic County, underlying a mostly suburban setting. While hosting patches of woodlands, perched wetlands, and traprock glades, the hill is largely unprotected from development. Extensive quarrying for trap rock has obliterated large tracts of the hill in North Haledon, and Prospect Park. Conservation efforts seeking to preserve undeveloped land, such as the local Save the Woods initiative (2007–present), are ongoing.

== Geography ==
Goffle Hill generally refers to the ridge of First Watchung Mountain north of the Passaic River and south of Campgaw Mountain. West of the ridge is a narrow valley dividing the tall peaks of the Preakness Range (part of Second and Third Watchung Mountain) from Goffle Hill. The east side of the ridge faces out over a wide, shallow valley extending to the Palisades. Historically, the ridge comprising Goffle Hill was known as Totoway Mountain, with the name Goffle Hill applied to the more prominent southern part of the ridge. Today, the name Goffle Hill is commonly used to describe the entire ridge despite the fact that the northern and southern sections of the ridge are quite different in terms of topography and surficial geology.

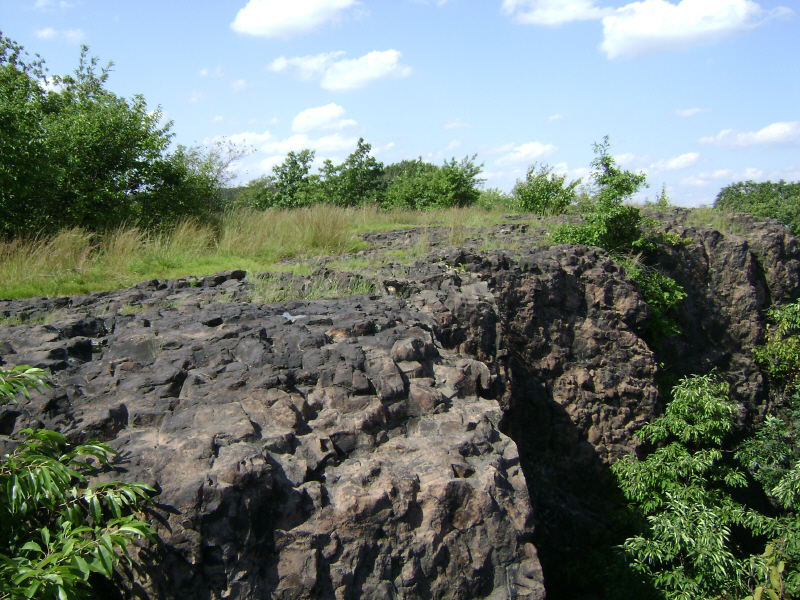
Basalt cliffs on the southern ridge

=== Southern Ridge ===
The southern ridge traverses the boroughs of Prospect Park, Haledon, North Haledon, Hawthorne and the township of Wyckoff, running generally north to south. Starting at the Great Falls of the Passaic River, the southern ridge rises gently to the north, culminating at an elevation of 602 ft40°58′33.81″N 74°10′07.93″W just inside of Hawthorne, near the border with North Haledon and Wyckoff. The summit marks the highest peak of Goffle Hill, though comparable peaks exist in the northern part of the ridge. The southern ridge is distinguished from the northern part of Goffle Hill by the presence of trap rock glades and vertical basalt cliffs which rise abruptly on portions of its eastern flank.

=== Northern Ridge ===
The northern part of Goffle Hill, underlying the area of Sicomac and the boroughs of Franklin Lakes and a section of Oakland, exists primarily as a low, broken ridgeline lacking in large precipices and running northwest to southeast. Modern maps show only one named peak on the northern ridge, a small trap rock prominence known as Knob Hill41°00′30.29″N 74°12′39.92″W which attains an elevation of 518 ft (158 m). This peak, which is located just north of Summit Ave in Franklin Lakes, marks the only significant trap rock found at the surface of the northern ridge. In addition to Knob Hill, five other unnamed peaks reach an elevation over five hundred feet, with the highest summit on the northern ridge reaching an elevation of 584 ft41°00′19.96″N 74°12′22.45″W in Franklin Lakes.

== History ==
Goffle Hill was first inhabited by the Lenape, whose language the ridge’s historical name, Totoway Mountain, is derived from. Totoway, or the more contemporary Totowa, means ‘the falls between river and mountain’. The term was used to describe the Great Falls of the Passaic River, which spill over a notch in the ridge of First Watchung Mountain. Europeans later applied the name to the section of ridge north of the falls.

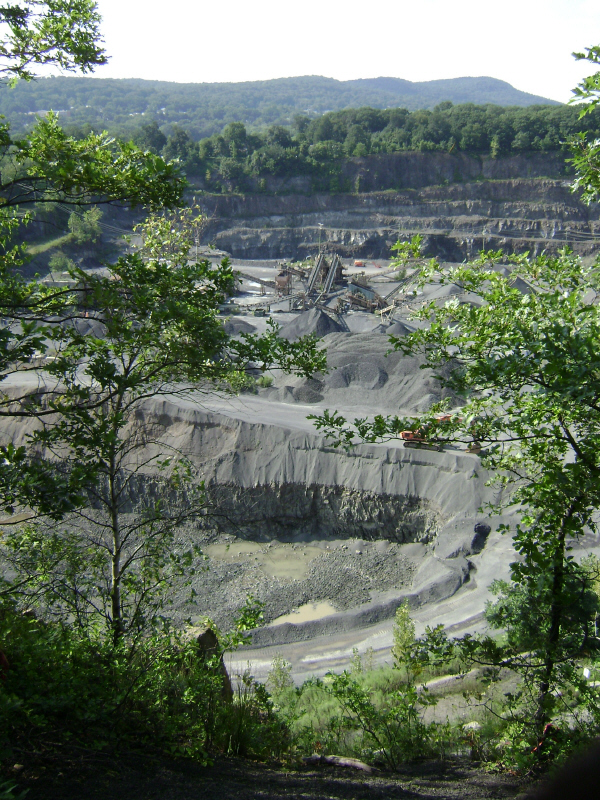
Modern quarry in Prospect Park

The ridge’s modern name, Goffle Hill, is derived from the Dutch. Goffle is a corruption of the word gaffel, which means ‘fork’, referring to the fact that Goffle Hill stood at a fork in a prominent Lenape trail. For a time, Goffle Hill was also known as Wagaraw Mountain. Wagaraw was a Lenape term, meaning ‘low country at the bend of the river’ –the north bend of the Passaic River.

It is fitting that the ridge’s Lenape names are derived from terms involving the Passaic River. Lenape camps have been discovered mostly along the banks of the river’s tributaries at the foot of the hill. Originally, these streams served as a vital freshwater and fishing source. Later, with the arrival of Europeans, the hill’s streams powered mills, aiding in the settlement and farming of the northern Passaic River valley. Trap rock and sandstone (freestone) quarrying on the hill served the building boom that occurred in the nineteenth and twentieth centuries.

During the American Revolutionary War, the hill, as with the rest of the Watchungs, served as a lookout. In 1780, General Lafayette’s light infantry were stationed on the eastern flank of the hill. Lafayette’s headquarters were situated at the foot of the hill in what is now Goffle Brook Park in Hawthorne.

== Geology ==
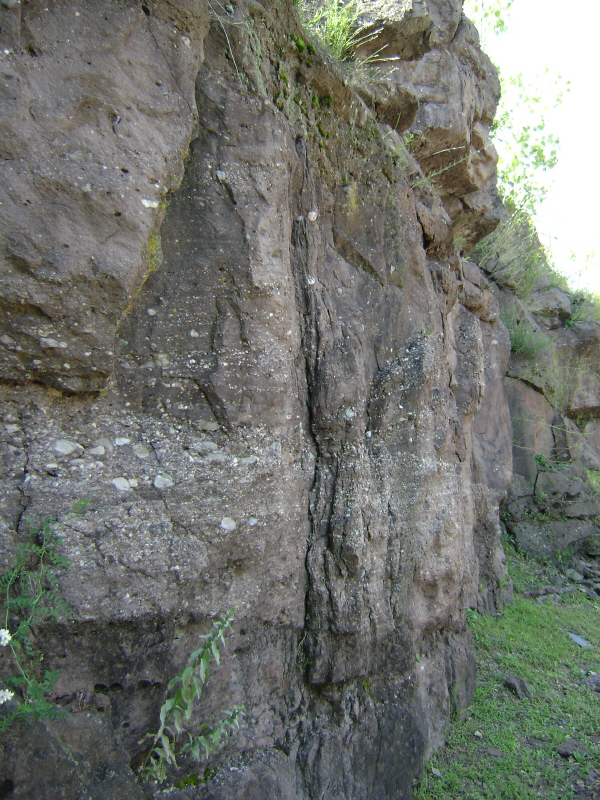
Sandstone cliff in Hawthorne

Goffle Hill formed as molten rock extruded onto the surface 185 million years ago. At that time the range occupied the northern section of an active rift valley running through northern and central New Jersey and part of Pennsylvania. After the rift failed in the early Jurassic, the range was elevated as erosion removed the sandstone and shale surrounding the basalt lava flows of Goffle Hill.

The northern part of Goffle Hill, except in a few locations, is buried under a mantle of glacially derived sediments and sandstone, greatly reducing its topographic prominence. The southern part of the ridge displays a significant amount of trap rock, though some underlying red sandstone reaches up to the ridgeline halfway along the border of North Haledon and Hawthorne where quarrying has stripped away overlying trap rock. The majority of exposed trap rock occurs along high mural precipices facing to the east.

Exposures of hornfels on Goffle Hill are limited, but they occur readily in at least one location. Along the Hawthorne-North Haledon border a contact can be seen between adjacent sandstone and basalt. This contact reveals the presence of indurated red sandstone that has been baked into a grey hornfels by the heat of the First Watchung lava flow.

== Ecology ==
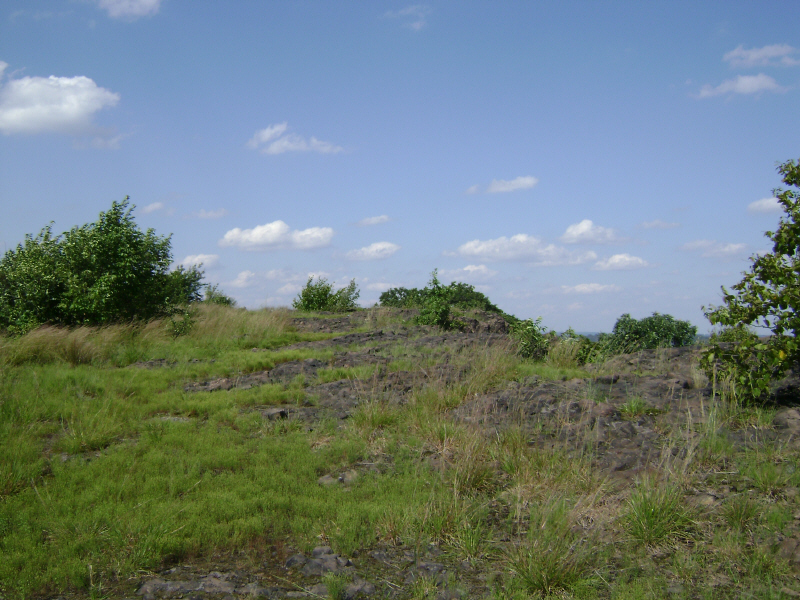
Trap rock glade on the border of Hawthorne and North Haledon

The native forests of Goffle Hill have been devastated by suburbanization and disease. An 1894 New Jersey forestry report indicated that, in addition to oak, redcedar and chestnut were the most abundant trees on Goffle Hill. Today, chestnuts have been eliminated by the accidental importation of chestnut blight in the early twentieth century. Redcedar, which was cited as the most prevalent tree on the ridge in 1894, a pioneering tree of secondary forest, can be found only in a few isolated clusters along the southern ridgeline.

A few trap rock glades continue to exist on Goffle Hill, though development is slowly reducing their numbers. The majority of the remaining trap rock glades straddle the ridgeline of Goffle Hill along the border of North Haledon and Hawthorne. Residential development has been hindered somewhat at the ridgeline due to the presence of high, vertical basalt cliffs. However, quarrying has removed a considerable section of trap rock glade in this area.

Perched wetlands are scattered along the ridge. One of the larger wetlands contains Goffle Pond, which feeds a headstream of Goffle Brook. Other significant wetlands help feed Molly Ann Brook and Deep Voll Brook.

== Conservation ==
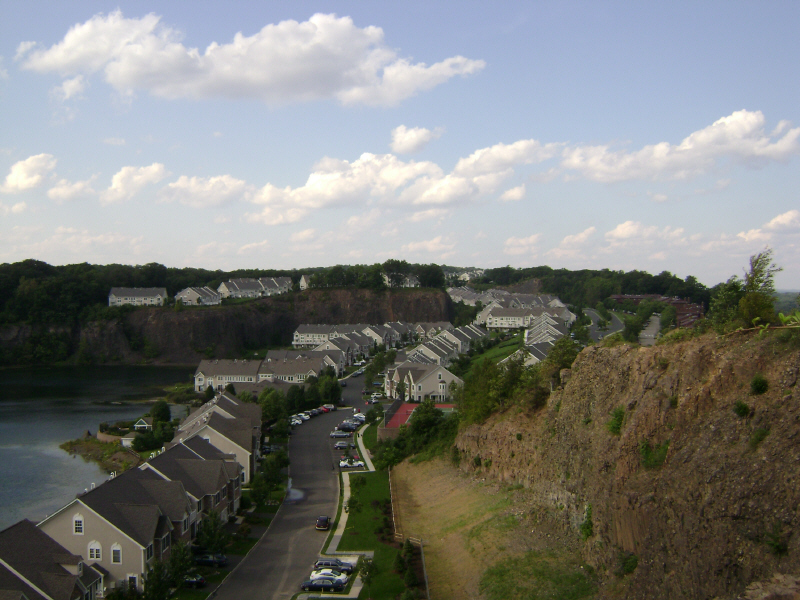
Recent residential development on Goffle Hill

Development along Goffle Hill has accelerated in recent years, with new homes and backyards being built atop former trap rock glades and forests. As the ridgeline of the mountain has become increasingly suburbanized, fears have been raised about runoff and the continued destruction of what could be preserved in the public interest. Locals in Hawthorne in Wyckoff have formed an initiative known as Save the Woods, which is seeking to preserve 19 acres (77,000 m^{2}) of woodlands soon to be developed. Other initiatives to stop a townhouse development in Hawthorne and a residential development Wyckoff have failed. It is thought that these developments have since led to an increase in local flooding.

As of 2009, Goffle Hill contains no preserved land. Only one park, Hofstra Park, a municipal recreation facility maintained by Prospect Park, exists wholly on Goffle Hill. Goffle Brook Park, maintained by Passaic County, sits on the foot of the hill, partly overlapping the lowest part of the eastern flank.

== Recreation ==
From north to south,

- High Mountain Golf Club
- Goffle Brook Park
- Hofstra Park

== See also ==
- Preakness Range
