= High Mountain Park Preserve =

Protected area in New Jersey, United States

Coordinates: 40°58′12″N 74°11′54″W

High Mountain Park Preserve is a protected area of the Preakness Range of the Watchung Mountains in Wayne, New Jersey, United States. Established in 1993, it comprises 1,153 acres (5 km^{2}) of woodlands and wetlands owned and managed by The Nature Conservancy.

It is one of the largest tracts of conserved land in northern New Jersey. It serves to protect nine ecological communities harboring 380 plant species, 18 of which are rare. Some of the globally imperiled plants found in the area include Torrey's mountain mint (Pycnanthemum torreyi) and basil-leaved mountain mint (Pycnanthemum clinopodioides), which, along with narrow-leaved vervain (Verbena simplex), are also classified as endangered by the state. Hazel dodder (Cuscuta coryli), declared imperiled by the state, has been recorded as well.

The preserve contains geological points of interest, including a traprock basalt glade and rock shelters which have been determined to be sites of prehistoric human habitation. During the American Revolution, high points along the ridge were used as signaling posts. Hiking trails are maintained by the New York-New Jersey Trail Conference. The summit of High Mountain provides views of New York City.

High Mountain Park Preserve is open to visitors but prohibits fishing, hunting, trapping, collecting, motor vehicles, aircraft, horses and unleashed pets, camping, fires, firearms, rock climbing, spelunking, and feeding of wild animals.

In the summer of 2013, a northern extension of the Red Trail was blazed along the sidewalk of Reservoir Drive to provide access to the Franklin Lakes Nature Preserve. The new northern terminus of the Red Trail is a junction with the Preserve Shoreline Loop (White Trail) just inside the nature preserve.
