= Goffle Brook Park =

Park in New Jersey, United States

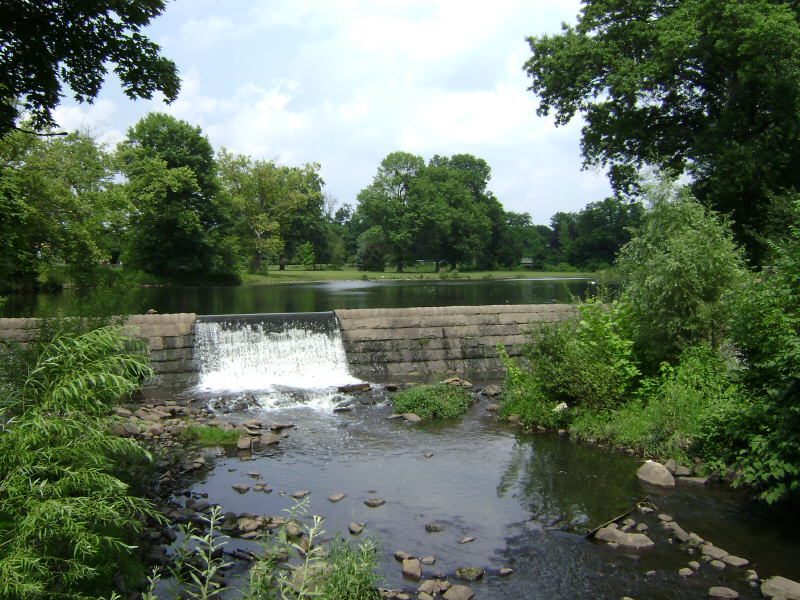
- Arnold’s Pond in Goffle Brook Park, Hawthorne
- Interactive map of Goffle Brook Park
- Type: County park
- Location: Hawthorne, New Jersey, USA
- Coordinates: 40°56′51″N 74°09′45″W
- Area: 103 acres (42 ha)
- Created: 1932
- Operator: Passaic County Parks & Recreation
- Open: All year
- Goffle Brook Park
- U.S. National Register of Historic Places
- New Jersey Register of Historic Places
- Location within Passaic County, New Jersey Location within New Jersey Location within the United States
- Coordinates: 40°56′51″N 74°09′45″W
- Built: 1932
- Architect: Olmsted Brothers
- NRHP reference No.: 02001276
- NJRHP No.: 4072

Significant dates
- Added to NRHP: November 1, 2002
- Designated NJRHP: August 29, 2002

Goffle Brook Park is a public, county park spanning much of the length of Goffle Brook through the borough of Hawthorne in Passaic County, New Jersey, United States. Since its designation and construction between 1930 and 1932, the park has served to protect the waters of Goffle Brook while at the same time providing recreational opportunities to the residents of Passaic County and nearby Bergen County. Goffle Brook Park has been included in the National Register of Historic Places since 2002.

== History ==
The greenway park was designed during the early stages of the creation of the Passaic County Park System by the firm of Olmsted Associates, heirs to the practice of Frederick Law Olmsted, which at the time was operated by Frederick Law Olmsted Jr. As originally planned, the 103-acre (0.42 km^{2}) park consisted of wide, manicured meadows, woodlands, and a former mill pond surrounded by walking paths. Since the 1930s, playgrounds, athletic fields, and a dog run have been added. Additionally, the borough of Hawthorne now maintains a series of small trails in the 8-Acre Woods at the southern end of the park. Hawthorne High School maintains a substantial recreational complex adjacent to Goffle Brook Park that includes a football stadium, running track, baseball fields, hockey rink, and tennis courts.

Mary Delaney Krugman Associates, Inc., a group of historic preservation consultants, was responsible for the nomination of Goffle Brook Park to both the New Jersey and National Historic Places Registry. The consultants acted on behalf of the "Please Save Our Parkland Committee" based in the borough of Hawthorne.

=== 2013 beautification project ===
In 2012, Passaic County awarded funds to begin a multi-year project to beautify Goffle Brook Park, stabilize Goffle Brook, and reconstruct road bridges over the brook at Warburton Avenue and Rea Avenue As of 2014, stream bank stabilization had been completed throughout the park, the Warburton Ave bridge had been rebuilt, and hundreds of invasive, sickly, and hazardous plants and trees (primarily Norway Maple and Sumac) had been removed. Plants native to North America were used to reinforce the banks of Goffle Brook, in combination with boulder walls and rock armored bank toes. Additionally, new walking and jogging paths were created, along with benches and refuse bins.

To offset the loss of trees during the initial stages of the project, over four hundred new trees were planted. Five hundred new shrubs and plants were also installed, including the vegetation used to restore the banks of the brook. Plantings along the stream banks include various willow species, such as Salix discolor (American Willow) and Salix amygdaloides (Peachleaf Willow).

=== Colonial past ===
Prior to the American Revolution, two Lenape camps existed within the boundaries of what would eventually become the park. The more significant of the two camps sat at the confluence of Goffle Brook and Deep Voll Brook.

The area of Goffle Brook Park played a significant part in the American Revolutionary War. For a time, General Lafayette’s troops were stationed along Goffle Brook. In particular, Major Lee's Virginia light horse troop occupied the east bank of the brook in 1780, while Lafayette's light infantry occupied the west bank on the flank of First Watchung Mountain. Lafayette's headquarters were at the Ryerson House, the former location of which is marked atop a small hill in the southern section of the park.

== Description ==
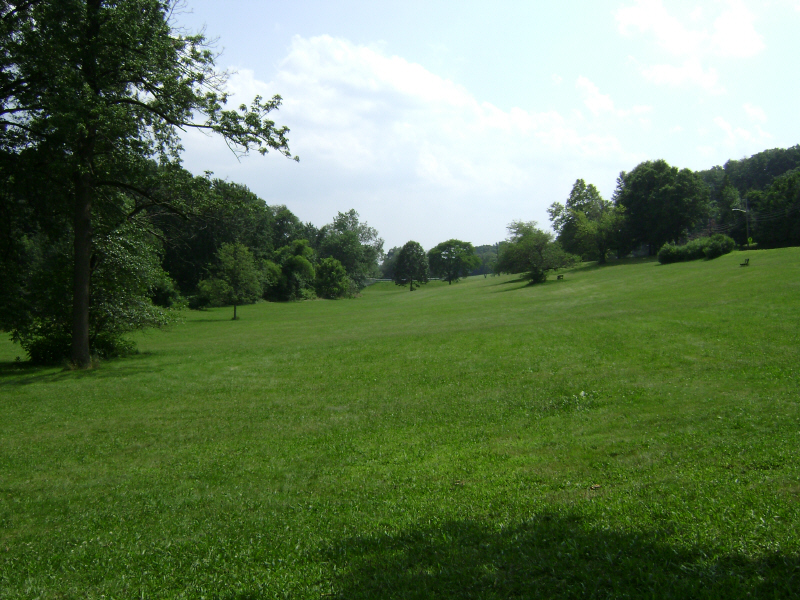
Meadow in the southern section of Goffle Brook Park.

Sitting on the eastern foot of Goffle Hill (First Watchung Mountain), the verdant Goffle Brook Park follows Goffle Brook for a little over a mile and a half between CR 665 Lafayette Ave and MacFarlan Ave/Maitland Ave in Hawthorne. While no wider than a third of a mile, the park offers sweeping views from its southern meadows. In the winter, these hilly sections of the park are popular sleigh riding attractions. The southern section of the park also features an enclosed dog run, various ball fields, two playgrounds, a picnic area, and wooded walking trails.

The northern part of the park features Arnold's Pond, a former grist mill pond now used primarily for fishing. Another main feature of north end is the single, trodden footpath paralleling Goffle Brook north of CR 654 Diamond Bridge Ave. The path is paved around Arnold's Pond, but it is otherwise unimproved except for a concrete staircase extending down into the valley of Goffle Brook from the corner of CR 659 Goffle Road and Warburton Avenue The northern part of the park also features a playground and a ball field near the corner of CR 659 Goffle Road and CR 664 Rea Ave.

== Magee Road Bridge ==
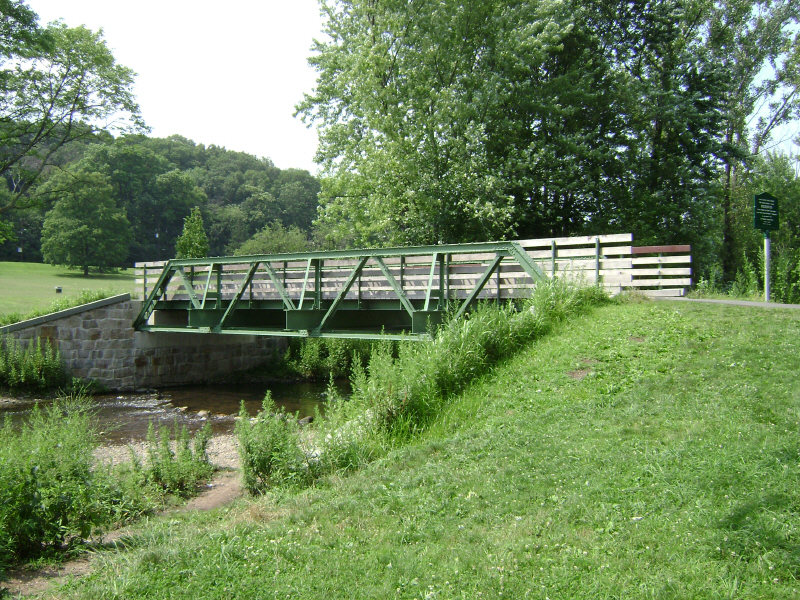
The historic Magee Road Bridge in Goffle Brook Park.

In 2007, the southern end of Goffle Brook Park saw the emplacement of the historic Magee Road Bridge over Goffle Brook. Built in 1930, the bridge originally spanned West Brook in Ringwood, New Jersey. Its steel frame and wood deck construction is an example of a hybrid truss design, specifically a pony truss. When the bridge was located in Ringwood it was eligible for the National Register of Historic Places.

== See also ==
- National Register of Historic Places listings in Passaic County, New Jersey
- Garret Mountain Reservation, a nearby park designed by the Olmsted firm around the same time as Goffle Brook Park.
