= Kings Pond Park =

Park in New Jersey, United States

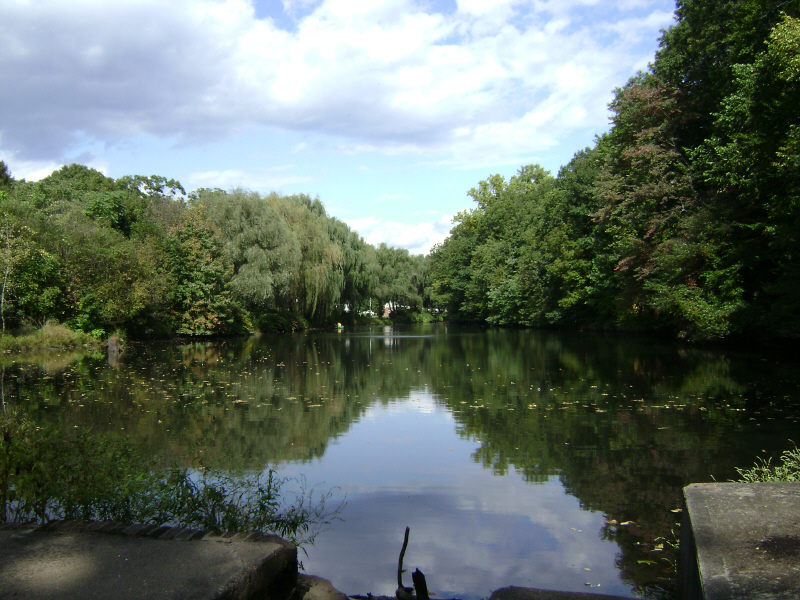
- Kings Pond in Kings Pond Park, Ridgewood
- Interactive map of Kings Pond Park
- Type: Municipal park
- Location: Ridgewood, New Jersey, United States
- Coordinates: 40°58′41″N 74°08′31″W
- Area: 30 acres (12 ha)
- Operator: Village of Ridgewood Division of Parks, Shade Tree, and School Grounds
- Status: Open all year

Kings Pond Park, including the associated Gypsy Pond Park, is a public, municipal park spanning close to the entire length of Goffle Brook through the village of Ridgewood in Bergen County, New Jersey. It is the second largest wildscape in the village of Ridgewood and one of the larger wooded areas along the lower Bergen-Passaic border.

== Description ==
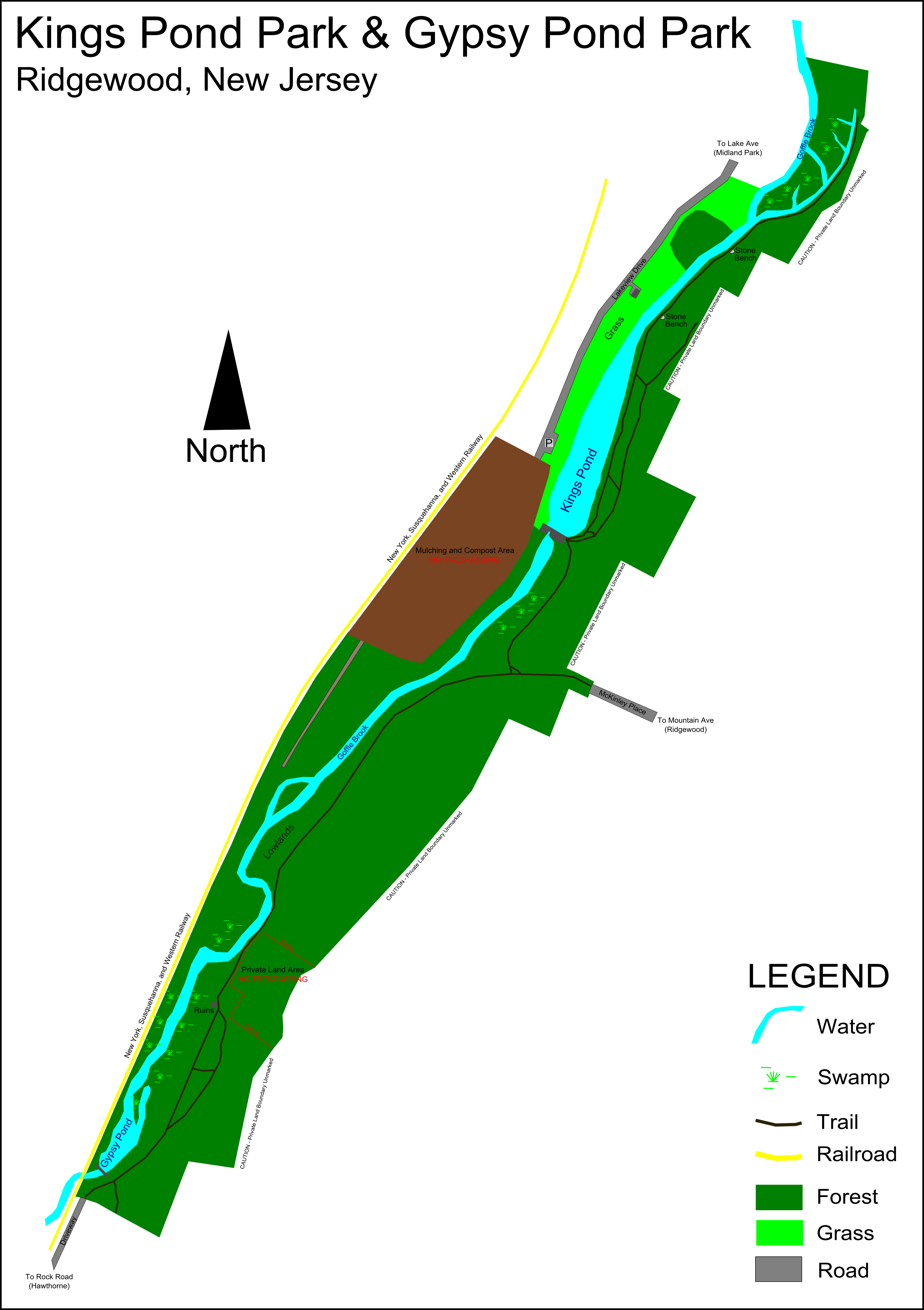
Map of Kings Pond Park and Gypsy Pond Park

Kings Pond Park forms a forested greenway extending from just south of CR 87 Lake Ave at the Midland Park border to just north of Rock Rd at the Hawthorne/Passaic County border. Technically, Kings Pond Park is really two parks, Kings Pond Park, surrounding Kings Pond in north, and Gypsy Pond Park, encircling its namesake pond in the south. The main entrance to the park is on the east side of Lakeview Drive, but there are additional entrances, including a path running from the end of McKinley Place (off of nearby Mountain Ave). Another entrance is found along the Hawthorne border where an unmarked driveway enters the park from Rock Road, following the New York, Susquehanna and Western Railway.

The main feature of the park is a nature trail which extends nearly a mile across the park's length. Other recreational opportunities primarily involve the park's two ponds and include ice skating in the winter and fishing and canoeing in the summer. Additionally, a grassy field covers much of the west bank of Kings Pond along Lakeview Drive.

== Wildlife ==
Forty species of birds reside in Kings Pond Park, including many common species of ducks and Canada geese. In the forest, bracken fern is a prominent ground plant. Another plant commonly seen growing along the railroad bed is pinxter flower, or pink azalea (Rhododendron periclymenoides). Herbs such as wild garlic and mustard also grow throughout the park.

== See also ==
- Goffle Brook Park, which follows Goffle Brook through most of the neighboring borough of Hawthorne
