= Preakness =

Preakness may refer to:

- The Preakness or Preakness Stakes, an American flat thoroughbred horse race held in Baltimore, Maryland
- Preakness (horse), an American thoroughbred racehorse from Preakness Stables
- Preakness, New Jersey, a section of Wayne in Passaic County, New Jersey
- Preakness Range, a range of the Watchung Mountains in northern New Jersey
- Preakness Stud, a former thoroughbred horse racing breeding farm and racing stable in Preakness, New Jersey
