= Blue Mountain (New Jersey) =

Mountain in Sussex County, New Jersey

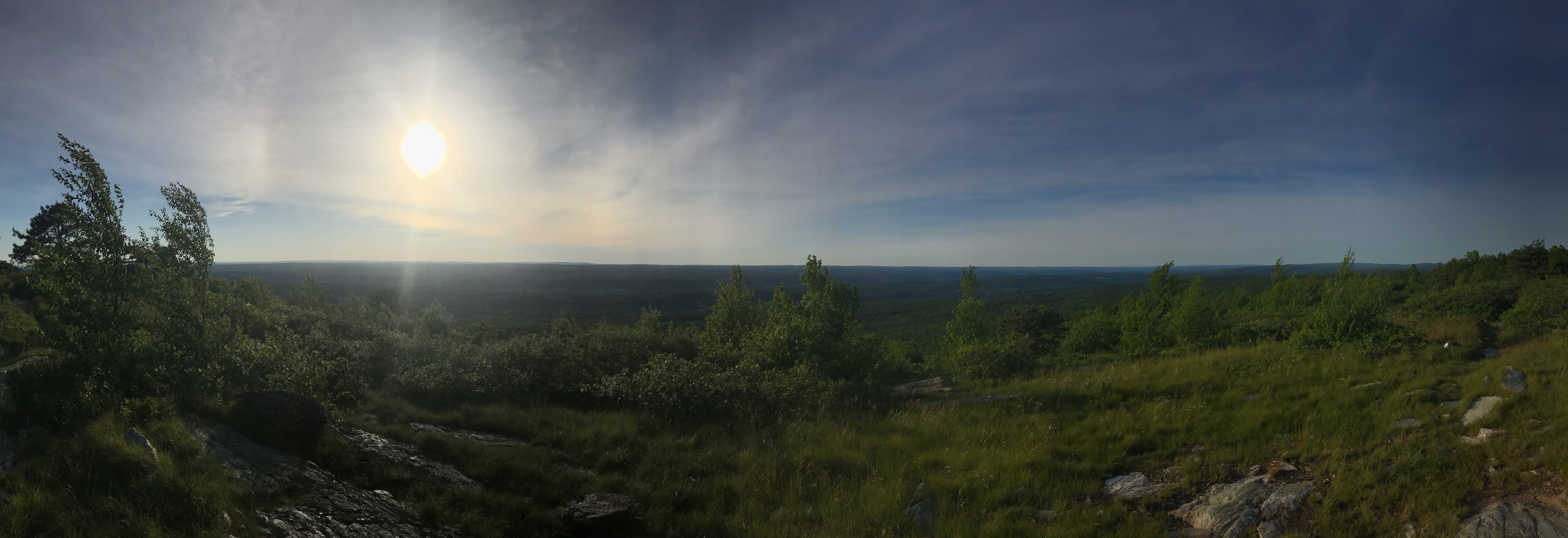
- Blue Mountain peak along the Appalachian Trail in Stokes State Forest

Highest point
- Elevation: 1,420 ft (430 m) NGVD 29
- Prominence: 100 ft (30 m)
- Coordinates: 41°8′49″N 74°50′56″W

Geography
- Location: Sussex County, New Jersey, U.S.
- Parent range: Kittatinny Mountains, Appalachians

Climbing
- Easiest route: Hiking

Blue Mountain is a peak of the Kittatinny Mountains in Sussex County, New Jersey, United States. The mountain is 1,420 feet (433 m) in height. It lies along the Appalachian Trail in Stokes State Forest, 4 miles west of the U.S. Route 206 crossing, and overlooks Quick's Pond to the south, and Mecca Lake to the southeast.

== History ==
The name Blue Mountains has had several referents in New Jersey in past centuries. It was formerly the name for the entire Kittatinny Mountains, and the Watchung Mountains were sometimes called blue. In New Jersey the name is now generally restricted to this peak alone, although the Pennsylvania portion of the range is still known as Blue Mountain. The Lawrence Line, dividing East Jersey and West Jersey, crosses the mountain at this point.
