= Campgaw Mountain =

Mountain in New Jersey, United States

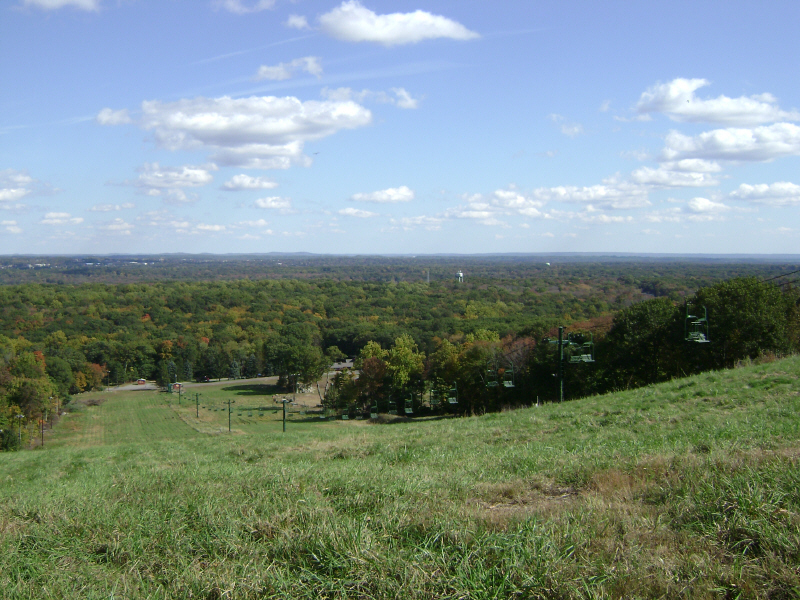
- Ski slope in Campgaw Mountain Reservation

Highest point
- Elevation: 752 ft (229 m)
- Coordinates: 41°03′15″N 74°11′57″W

Geography
- Location within Bergen County, New Jersey Location within New Jersey
- Location: Bergen County, New Jersey, U.S.
- Topo map: USGS Ramsey

Geology
- Rock age: 200,000,000 years
- Mountain type: extrusive igneous / trap rock

Climbing
- Easiest route: Hike

Campgaw Mountain is the northernmost ridge of the volcanically formed Watchung Mountains, along the border of Franklin Lakes, Oakland, and Mahwah in Bergen County, New Jersey, United States. Located almost entirely within the bounds of Campgaw Mountain Reservation, the mountain offers numerous outdoor recreational opportunities, including the only ski slope in the Watchungs. Campgaw Mountain is commonly considered to be part of the greater Ramapo Mountains region, but the flora and geology of the mountain is quite different from the surrounding area and more closely resembles the nearby Preakness Range to the south.

== Geography ==
Campgaw Mountain extends for three miles approximately north to south along the border of Franklin Lakes, Oakland, and Mahwah. The peak of the mountain rises to 752 feet (229 meters) in Mahwah, becoming the fourth highest peak of Watchungs, though the height of the mountain as measured from its base is generally less than 400 feet (120 meters). A shallow gap exists between Campgaw Mountain and the Preakness and Goffle Hill ranges of the Watchungs to the south, somewhat isolating the ridge from the rest of the Watchung Mountains despite contiguous geology below the surface. In the north, the mountain terminates at the Ramapo Fault, the western border of the Newark Basin. Campgaw Mountain also marks the eastern edge of the Ramapo River Valley, forming a sizable basin between itself and the Ramapo Mountains.

An unusual trait of Campgaw Mountain is that it is composed of the ridges of both First and Second Watchung Mountain. Fyke Brook, a tributary of the Ramapo River, divides the two ridges, running northwest through a narrow valley along the northeastern corner of the mountain. Second Watchung Mountain comprises the majority of Campgaw Mountain at the surface.

== History ==
Before the arrival of Europeans, Campgaw Mountain was inhabited by Munsee (Minsi) Lenape. Evidence of the Lenape presence around Campgaw can be found in a former village that existed on the north side of the mountain, along the south bank of the Ramapo River. Reflecting on this Native American heritage, the mountain is named for a Lenape chief, Kum-Kow, with the name Campgaw being a modern variation of the original spelling. Taken literally, the syllables in the name Kum-Kow probably translate to goose-hedgehog.

A historical account from 1834 indicates that Campgaw Mountain's summits were once under extensive cultivation. That would seem to explain the numerous stone walls, apparently former property boundaries, running through the woods along the mountain. Another historical work from 1894 detailing New Jersey's forests shows that Campgaw Mountain was covered by a nearly unbroken expanse of chestnut, oak, and redcedar, indicating that cultivation along the ridgeline may have declined by that time. Campgaw Mountain was essentially wilderness in 1960 when property on the ridge was taken by the Bergen County Park Commission to create Campgaw Mountain Reservation. The park, which opened in June 1961, forced many of the Ramapough Mountain Indians inhabiting Campgaw Mountain and the surrounding area off their land.

In addition to the development of the park, Campgaw Mountain saw the construction of a Nike missile base during the height of the Cold War. Installed on the mountain between 1955 and 1971, the base's missiles served to guard New York City's air space, standing by to intercept nuclear-armed Soviet bombers. The facility was ultimately abandoned with the advent of intercontinental ballistic missiles.

== Geology ==
Campgaw Mountain formed as molten rock extruded onto the surface 185 million years ago. At the time the mountain occupied the northern section of an active rift valley running through northern and central New Jersey and part of Pennsylvania. After the rift failed in the early Jurassic, the mountain was elevated as erosion removed the sandstone and shale surrounding the basalt lava flows of Campgaw Mountain.

The main ridge of the mountain is primarily composed of Preakness Basalt, being an extension of Second Watchung Mountain, but the northeast corner of the mountain is composed of Orange Mountain Basalt, as the ridge of First Watchung Mountain emerges from surrounding glacial sediments along the north side of main ridge. The combined ridges of First and Second Watchung Mountain make a slight turn to the west before terminating at the Ramapo Fault, marking the northernmost limit of the Watchung Mountains.

Campgaw Mountain appears somewhat detached from the rest of the Watchungs because it occupies a local syncline (downfold) that is itself somewhat detached from the main Watchung syncline by an intervening anticline (upfold). The effect of this is that, when traveling north from the Preakness Range and Goffle Hill, the ridges of First and Second Watchung Mountain seem to slowly dip back into the Earth before reemerging again as Campgaw Mountain. Despite the apparent gap at the surface, Campgaw Mountain is firmly linked to the rest of the Watchungs by the continuity of the ridges through the anticline.

== Ecology ==
Campgaw Mountain, while adjacent to the Ramapo Mountains, features a unique ecosystem in relation to the surrounding area. In fact, according to the U.S. EPA, Campgaw Mountain is in a level III and IV ecoregion that is completely different from the Ramapo Mountains. Specifically, Campgaw Mountain's ecology is defined by its status as a level IV trap rock and conglomerate upland (ecoregion 64b), similar to the nearby Preakness Range. Features of this ecoregion include thin, well-drained soils and oak forests. Hemlock forests on northern facing slopes are also common to this ecoregion, and these are characteristically present along the northeastern slope of Campgaw Mountain.

In addition to oak, chestnut and redcedar were historically prominent on Campgaw Mountain. Today, chestnuts have been eliminated by the accidental importation of chestnut blight in the early twentieth century. Redcedar, however, is still abundant along the ridgeline, unlike on nearby Goffle Hill, where the tree has been all but extirpated, and in the Preakness Range, where redcedar has become rare.

== Recreation ==
- Campgaw Mountain Reservation

There are two 18-hole disc golf courses at Campgaw. The Blue/Black courses (formerly Mighty Gaw) are available from April to November and have pars of 71 and 57. The Green course (formerly Campgaw) is shorter, runs through wooded areas around the hill, and is open year-round.

Campgaw's ski area is located on the eastern face of the ridge: offering skiers 20 acres of skiable area across 12 trails of varying difficulty accessed by two ascending chairlifts. Six tubing lanes are available as well, accompanied by two surface lifts that carry guests to the top.

== See also ==
- Watchung Mountains
- Preakness Range
- Goffle Hill
