= Washington Valley Park =

Public park in Somerset County, New Jersey

Washington Valley Reservoir
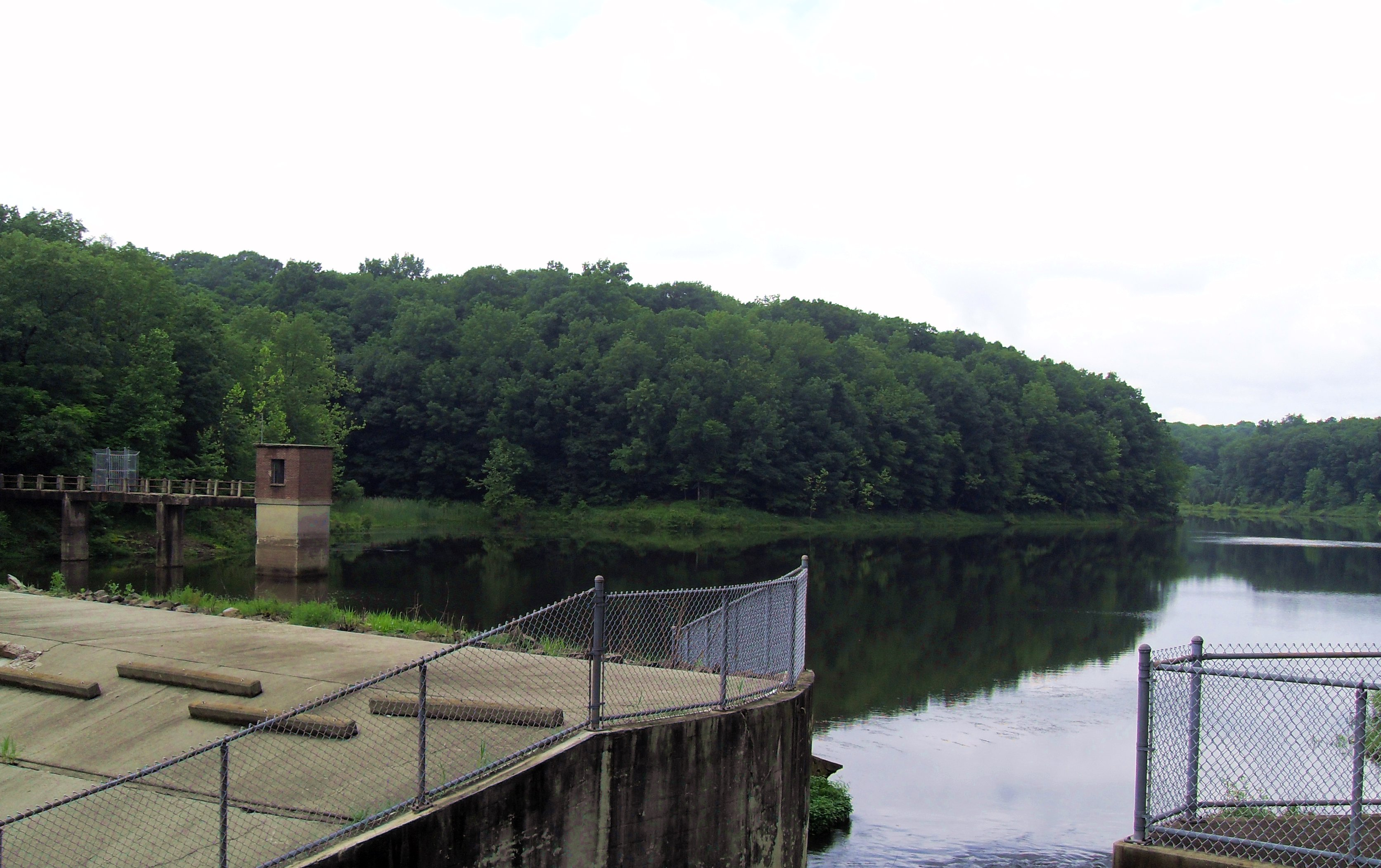

- Location within New Jersey
- Location: Somerset County, New Jersey, U.S.
- Coordinates: 40°35′35″N 74°33′54″W
- Primary inflows: West branch of Middle Brook
- Primary outflows: West branch of Middle Brook
- Basin countries: United States
- Surface area: 21 acres (8.5 ha)
- Surface elevation: 65 m (213 ft)
- Settlements: Bridgewater Township, NJ

Washington Valley Park is a 715-acre (2.89 km^{2}) public park between the first and second Watchung mountain ridge in the Martinsville section of Bridgewater Township, New Jersey that is administered by the Somerset County Park Commission. It contains the Washington Valley Reservoir and the Chimney Rock Hawk Watch.

== Park development ==
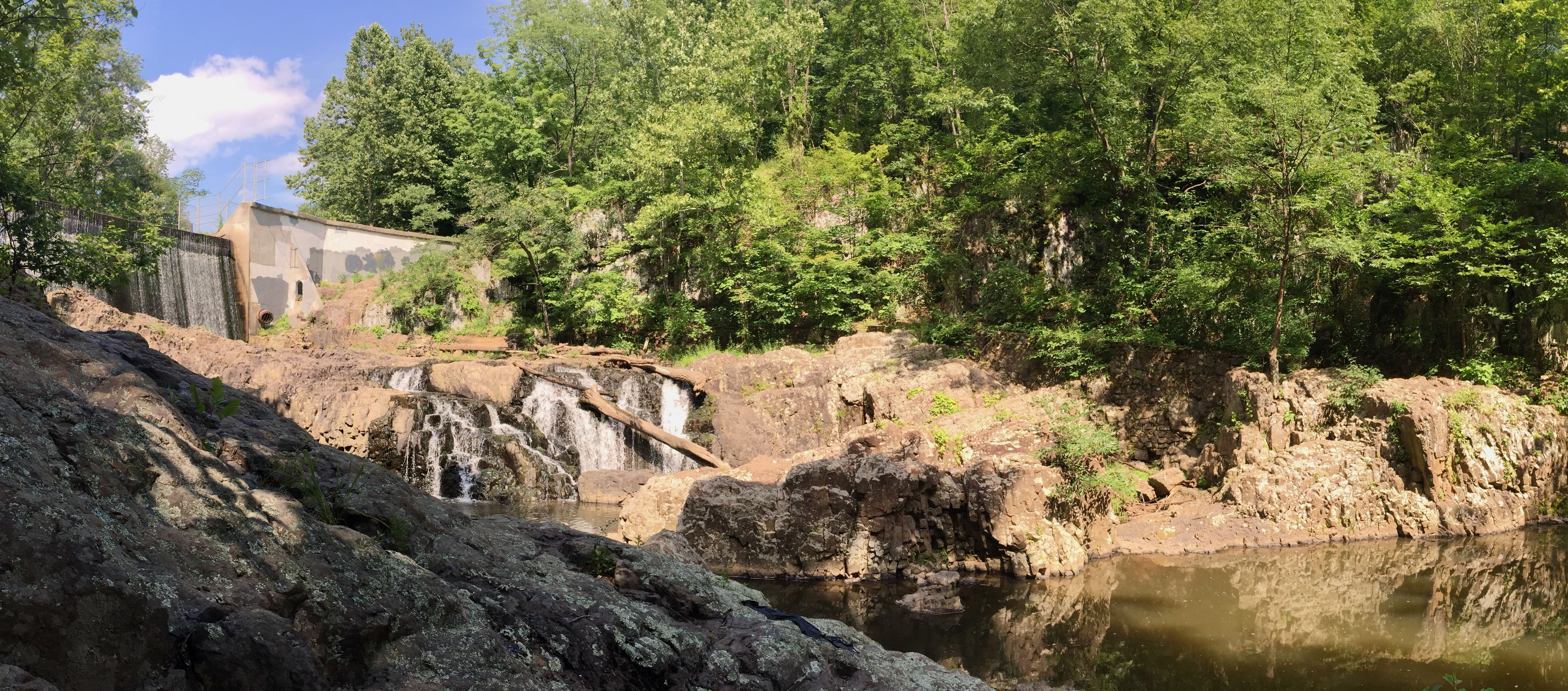
Buttermilk Falls

The only partially developed park has a western and eastern section separated by the Bound Brook Gap with the Chimney Rock Road that connects Bound Brook with Martinsville. The terrain is rocky and mountainous and covered with pine and hemlock. At the center of the western section of the park is the 21-acre (85,000 m^{2}) Washington Valley Reservoir (formerly known as the Bound Brook/Elizabeth Reservoir), which was created in 1920 when the western branch of the Middle Brook was dammed. The eastern section of the park has the much smaller East Branch Reservoir and the Buttermilk Falls of the eastern branch of the Middle Brook.

Adjacent to the park is the Chimney Rock Quarry built atop the old Chimney Rock Copper Mine a.k.a. Bound Brook Quarry or Washington Mine. Copper mines over 165 feet (50 m) deep exist and active mining continues to this day as owned and operated by the Stavola group of companies. The most famous copper find was used to mold a small brass cannon later used at the siege of Yorktown. Calcite has also been mined from the nearby Chimney Rock Quarry. Many marble and granite companies continue to operate in this area. In 1886, William Haelig leased the land from copper miners to establish his Chimney Rock Quarry. Before 1900, stone was carried out of the quarry to the railroad in Bound Brook by horse-drawn wagons. Haelig persuaded the Central Railroad of New Jersey to lay a spur to the stone pit. Trap rock quarrying was more profitable than mining, and the quarry is still active.

The reservoirs have no boat access and are of interest to anglers. Species that can be caught include largemouth bass, smallmouth bass, black crappie, bluegill, pumpkinseed, and yellow perch. The park contains numerous trails that are used by hikers and mountain bikers.

== Chimney Rock Hawk Watch ==
At an outcropping of the first Watchung mountain ridge is Chimney Rock Hawk Watch. In the fall, the area is visited by birdwatchers to observe the annual southward migration of raptors and other birds. In the 2008 season, they recorded 12,275 sightings, of these over 10,000 were hawks including 7,836 broad-winged hawks, 1,745 sharp-shinned hawks. Also there were 140 bald eagle and 17 golden eagle sightings. Hawk watching lasts from early September into November, the second half of September being the peak time.

== Middlebrook encampment ==
To some degree, the eastern section of the park covers a military fortification that was used by the Continental Army near the site of the 1777-78 Middlebrook encampment. Remnants can be found in the shape of earth walls. A look-out point is preserved that was used to observe movements of the British Army in the plains towards New Brunswick.
