= Franklin Lakes Nature Preserve =

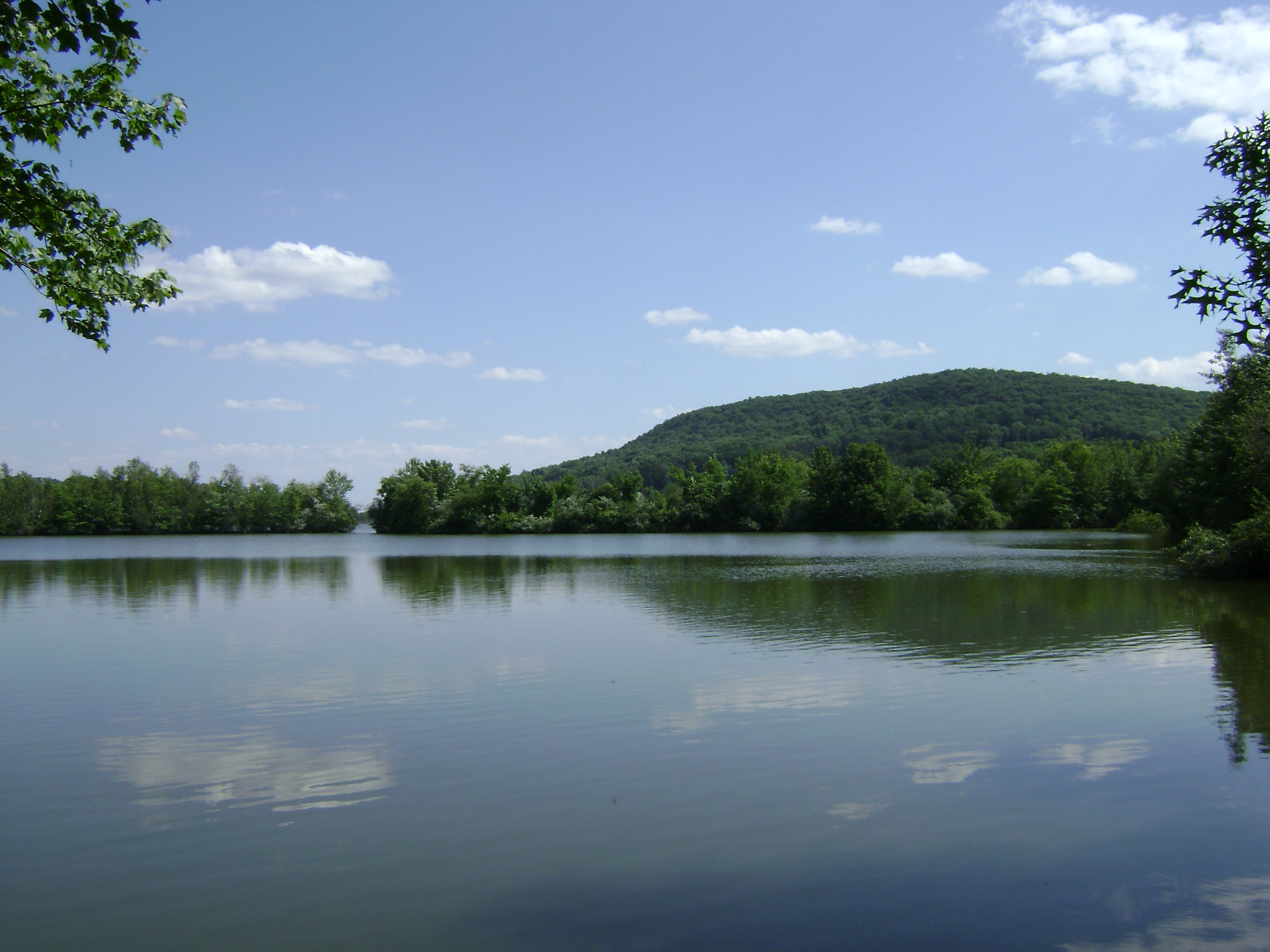
- High Mountain (tallest peak of the Watchung Mountains) is seen in the background of this image of the Haledon Reservoir in the Franklin Lakes Nature Preserve
- Interactive map of Franklin Lakes Nature Preserve
- Type: Nature Reserve
- Location: Franklin Lakes and North Haledon in New Jersey, USA
- Coordinates: 40°58′51″N 74°11′52″W
- Area: 147 acres (59 ha)
- Created: 2011
- Operator: Borough of Franklin Lakes
- Open: All year
- Parking: One lot

Franklin Lakes Nature Preserve is a 147 acre public nature reserve located mostly within Franklin Lakes, New Jersey, with a tiny portion extending into North Haledon, New Jersey. Situated between the First and Second ridges of the northern Watchung Mountains, the preserve occupies the site of the former Haledon Reservoir, which previously supplied water to North Haledon, Haledon, and Prospect Park. Passive recreation opportunities include hiking, fishing, and bird watching.

== History ==
The area of the Franklin Lakes Nature Preserve was once used as a reservoir and watershed to supply downstream municipalities with drinking water. To this end, Molly Ann Brook, which flows through the preserve, was dammed in 1919 to form the large Haledon Reservoir and an accompanying smaller basin. However, by the mid-2000s, the Haledon Reservoir and its surrounding property were disused and no longer maintained.

In 2006, the borough of Franklin Lakes, the host municipality of the majority of the property, purchased the reservoir facility in part with funds provided by the New Jersey Green Acres Program and the Bergen County Open Space Program. At the time, the site represented the largest land acquisition in the history of Franklin Lakes. After making extensive improvements to the property, including repairing roads and completing much needed maintenance on the property's two dams, the newly christened Franklin Lakes Nature Preserve was opened to the public in June, 2011.

== Description ==
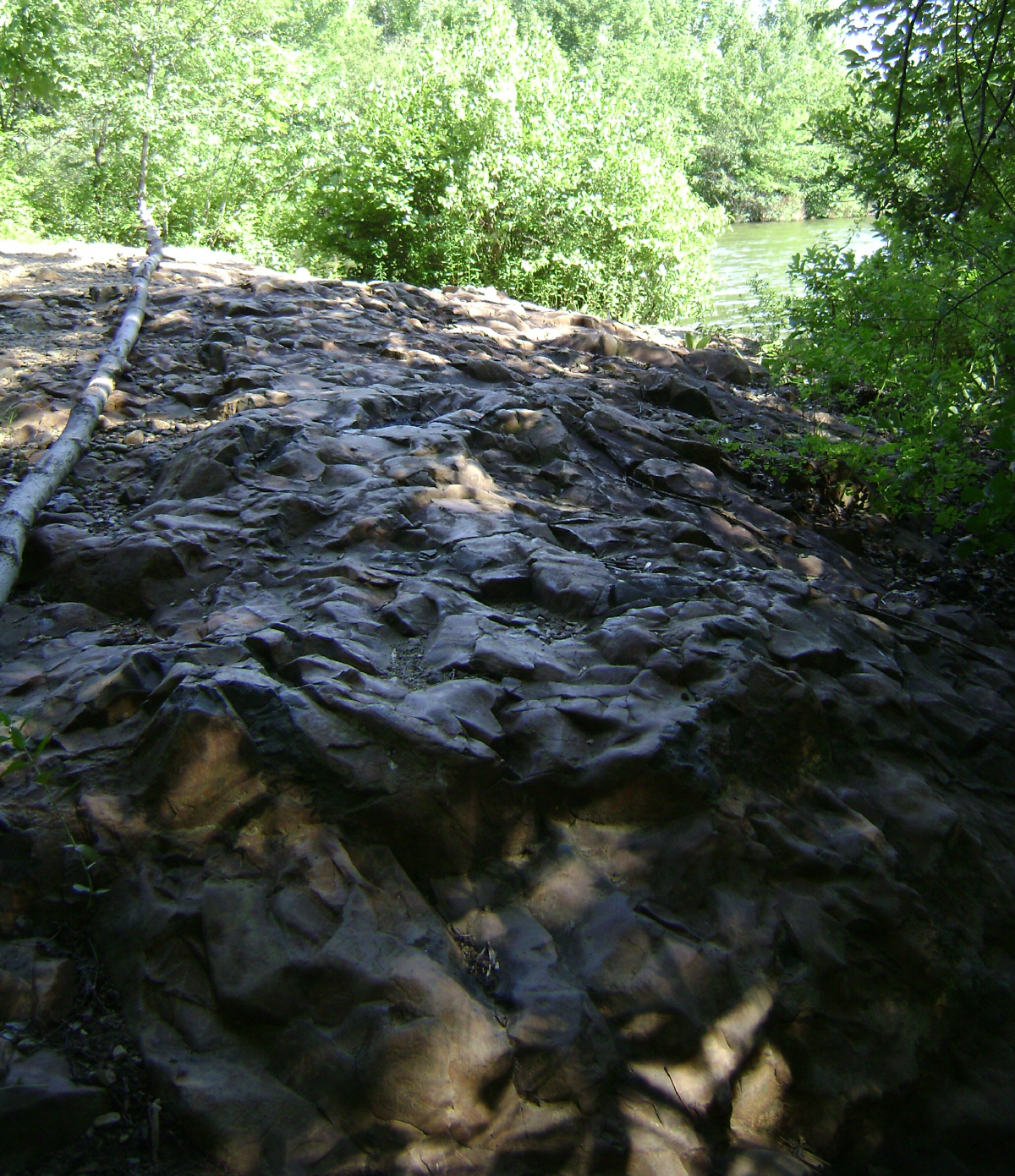
Ancient basalt lava along the shore of Haledon Reservoir

The 147 acre Franklin Lakes Nature Preserve sets aside 120 acres of land for public recreation, including 75 acres of water. Due to its location, the preserve features an unusual variety of terrain. Swamps and wetlands are extensive, visible in almost every section of the property. However, there are upland areas of the park, comprising manmade berms, gentle natural slopes, and the occasional knob or outcrop of volcanic traprock. This configuration gives rise to a unique setting where normally distant plant communities are near each other, providing the basis of a diverse ecology. Because of this distinctive environment, the preserve features a variety and abundance of insects, and it is reputed to be a good bird watching location.

There are two entrances into the preserve, leading visitors to different areas. The main entrance is just off of High Mountain Road in North Haledon, connecting to a road running across the top of the dam which impounds the lower basin pond. There is a parking lot at this entrance, a picnic area, and the start of the preserve's main path which stretches about a half mile along the east side of Haledon Reservoir. A few small, unmarked trails extend west off the main path, leading to the shore of the reservoir and part of the system of dikes extending out into the water. The main path also runs through a few areas of exposed volcanic basalt, lava that erupted to the surface 200 million years ago as the super continent Pangaea rifted apart during the early Jurassic. The largest outcrop occurs along the northeast corner of the reservoir, forming an approximately 50 foot wide ‘basalt beach’ that extends from the water's edge to the tree line.

The other entrance to the preserve is along Ewing Avenue, near where the road crosses the outlet of a swampy pond. There is no parking lot here, and access must be gained by foot. The entrance leads visitors onto a path which extends across the large, western dike structure projecting into the reservoir's waters. Many spots along the dike have been cleared for fishing, and excellent views of nearby High Mountain are possible from multiple locations.

=== Trailblazing ===
As of early 2012, the New York–New Jersey Trail Conference has blazed trails in the preserve. The preserve's main path, which previously only ran along the eastern shore, has been extended to make a complete loop around the reservoir. It has since been named the Preserve Shoreline Loop (White Trail).

An additional trail, the Island Bridges Trail (Blue Trail), has been blazed across the dike complex which projects into the reservoir. This trail was initially discontinuous between the western and eastern dike sections due to two channels that cut through the dike structure. However, in October, 2013 two floating bridges were constructed across the gaps, allowing the Island Bridges Trail to extend completely across the lake.

==== High Mountain Connection ====
In the summer of 2013, High Mountain Park Preserve's Red Trail was extended along the sidewalk of Reservoir Drive to connect to the Preserve Shoreline Loop (White Trail). This newly blazed section crosses High Mountain Road (Bergen County Route 89) at its intersection with Reservoir Drive, entering the nature preserve through a recently created opening in the perimeter fence. A painted crosswalk and accompanying signage to alert motorists to pedestrians were installed at the intersection to facilitate safer passage over the busy county road.

== Activities ==
- Fishing
- Bird Watching
- Hiking
- Walking/Jogging
- Picnics
- Small Boating
- Kayaking and Canoeing

The preserve, which requires a fishing license, has been listed as ‘one of the 100 best spots for fishing in New Jersey’. Common catches include largemouth bass, black crappie, pickerel, yellow perch, sunfish, giant carp, and catfish.

== See also ==
- High Mountain Park Preserve, which is approximately a half mile away
