= Goffle Brook =

Goffle Brook Wagaraw Brook
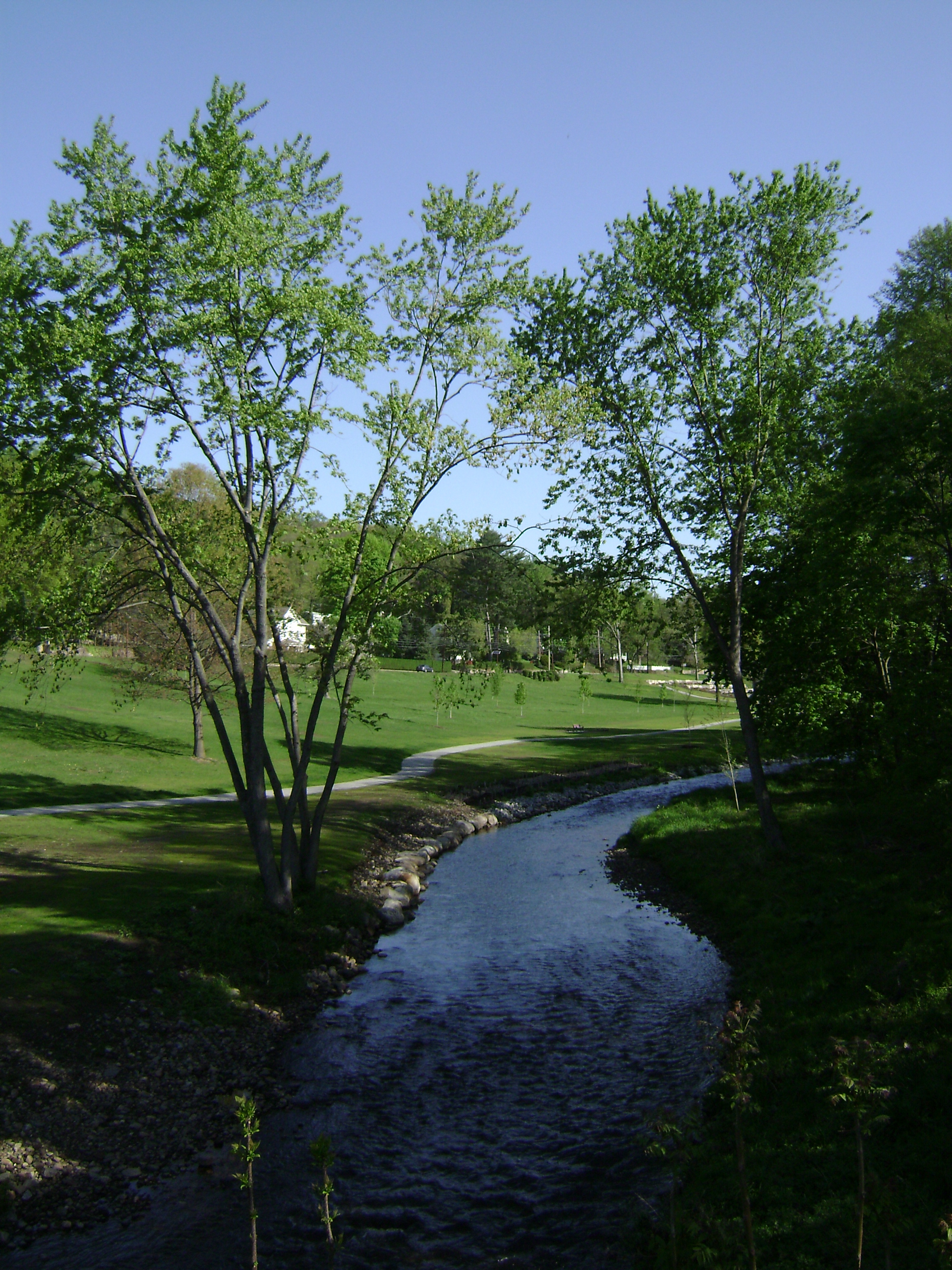
- Goffle Brook viewed from Diamond Bridge Ave in Hawthorne

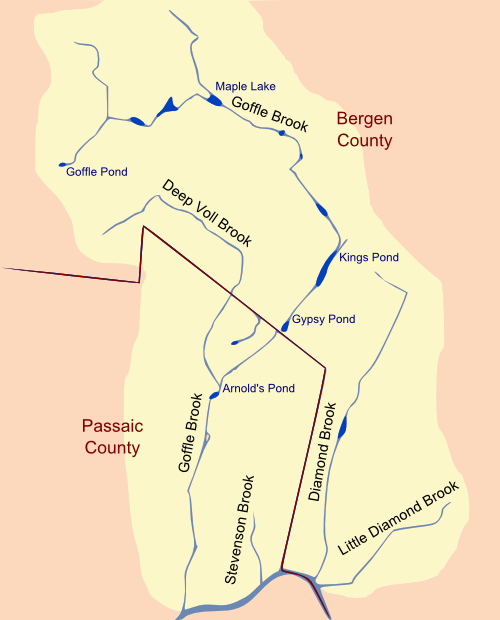
- Goffle Brook and Diamond Brook Watershed

Location
- Country: United States
- State: New Jersey
- Counties: Passaic, Bergen

Physical characteristics
- Source: Goffle Pond
  - location: Wyckoff, Bergen County, New Jersey, United States
  - coordinates: 40°59′29.25″N 74°10′58″W
  - elevation: 404 ft (123 m)
- Mouth: Passaic River
  - location: Hawthorne, Passaic County, New Jersey, United States
  - coordinates: 40°56′14.21″N 74°9′42.65″W
  - elevation: 36 ft (11 m)
- Length: 7 mi (11 km)

Basin features
- Tributaries
  - left: Deep Voll Brook

Goffle Brook is a tributary of the Passaic River which flows south through a section of Passaic County and Bergen County in New Jersey and drains the eastern side of the First Watchung Mountain. Heading up the brook from the confluence with the Passaic River, one encounters the borough of Hawthorne, the village of Ridgewood, the borough of Midland Park, and the township of Wyckoff.

== History ==
Goffle Brook has seen human occupation for hundreds of years, as evidenced by abundant Lenape camp sites along its banks. Two such camps are known to have existed near the brook’s mouth, while another two existed about one and a half miles upstream on the east bank. A fifth camp, still locally remembered, sat at the confluence of Deep Voll Brook and Goffle Brook.

During the American Revolutionary War, General Lafayette stationed his men along the banks of the brook. In 1780, Major Lee’s Virginia light horse troop occupied the east bank of the brook, while Lafayette’s light infantry corps occupied the flanks of First Watchung Mountain to the west. Lafayette’s headquarters sat on the western bank of the brook in what is now Goffle Brook Park south of Diamond Bridge Ave in Hawthorne.

Prior to the twentieth century, the brook’s gradation supported saw, grain, and grist mills. It was probably instrumental in initial settlement and farming of the northern Passaic River valley.

In addition to it uses as a drinking water supply and an energy source for mills, the brook has served as a focus for human creativity. New Jersey native William Carlos Williams immortalized the brook in his 1949 poem Spring is Here Again, Sir. The poem opens with the line, Goffle brook of a May day blossoms in the manner of antiquity.

Today, Goffle Brook serves as the centerpiece of Goffle Brook Park and Kings Pond Park, providing fishing and ice skating opportunities to local residents.

=== Relationship with the NYS&W Railway ===
The New York, Susquehanna & Western Railway parallels Goffle Brook for the majority of its route through Hawthorne, Ridgewood, Midland Park, and Wyckoff, running roughly along the centerline of the Goffle Brook drainage basin. The railroad crosses the brook only twice, once in Ridgewood and again in Midland Park.

== Tributaries ==
Traveling north along the brook from its mouth, the first tributary encountered is Janes Brook, in Hawthorne. Much of this small stream, which can be found in the wooded, southern section of Goffle Brook Park, was converted to a buried sewer in the twentieth century, but a tiny portion still remains at the surface where it empties into Goffle Brook. The second tributary encountered along Goffle Brook is Deep Voll Brook or Deep Brook (captioned name used by the USGS in 1995), which joins Goffle Brook just north of Goffle Hill Road at the far northern end of Goffle Brook Park in Hawthorne. Deep Voll Brook, which flows from northwest to southeast, is the most significant tributary of Goffle Brook, draining a sizeable portion of the northeastern corner of First Watchung Mountain in Hawthorne and Wyckoff.

Beyond Deep Voll Brook are two smaller streams that join Goffle Brook relatively close to each other. Both of these less significant tributaries appear to be unnamed. After these two tributaries is yet another tiny tributary that drains a small swamp at the head of Kings Pond, a manmade lake in southwest Ridgewood.

Continuing north, past the tributary at Kings Pond, Goffle Brook splits into western and eastern branches at Maple Lake, a former manmade swimming hole that was drained in the late 1980s. Of the two branches, the eastern branch is less significant, extending a short distance through Wyckoff before ending just inside the southern limit of Waldwick. The western branch almost completely bisects the town of Wyckoff through the midsection, ending west of Russell Ave at Goffle Pond, the source of Goffle Brook.

== Dams ==
Seven dams exist along Goffle Brook, although ten existed historically. In Hawthorne, a former dam at the southern end of Goffle Brook Park once held back Mill Pond. A dam just south of Goffle Hill Road now forms Arnold's Pond, often referred to as the Duck Pond. In Ridgewood, a dam just north of Rock Road forms Gypsy Pond, and a bigger dam just a little further upstream holds back Kings Pond. The current fourth and fifth dams exist just to the west of where Goffle Road crosses the brook in Midland Park. A dam that was destroyed during a storm lies just upstream from Sicomac Avenue bridge. This dam was held back the waters to form Morrow Pond which was a swimming hole in Midland Park. North of Canterbury Lane in Wyckoff a dam used to exist which held back Maple Lake, now a wetland in danger of development. Two more dams create large lakes on the north and south sides Wyckoff Ave, again in Wyckoff.

== See also ==
- List of New Jersey rivers
