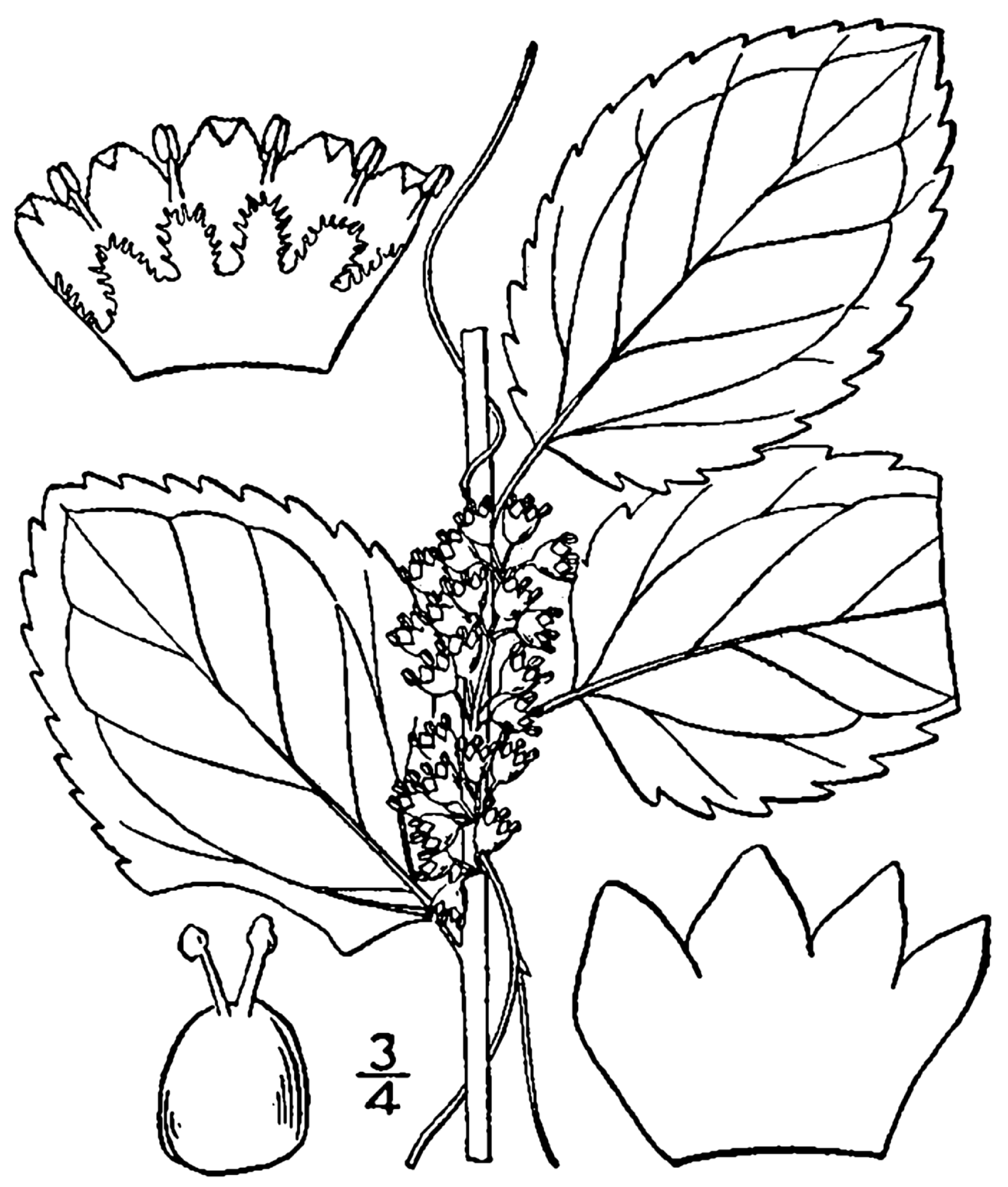

Scientific classification
- Kingdom: Plantae
- Clade: Tracheophytes
- Clade: Angiosperms
- Clade: Eudicots
- Clade: Asterids
- Order: Solanales
- Family: Convolvulaceae
- Genus: Cuscuta
- Species: C. coryli

Binomial name
- Cuscuta coryli Engelm.

= Cuscuta coryli =

Species of flowering plant

Cuscuta coryli, synonym Grammica coryli, common name hazel dodder, is a perennial plant in the Cuscutaceae family native to North America.

== Conservation status in the United States ==
It is listed as a special concern and believed extirpated in Connecticut, as endangered and extirpated in Maryland, as endangered in Ohio, and as historical in Rhode Island.

== As a noxious weed ==
The genus Cuscuta is listed as a noxious weed in Arizona, Arkansas, Massachusetts, Michigan, Oregon, and South Dakota. The genus is also listed as a noxious weed in Alabama, California, Florida, Minnesota, North Carolina, South Carolina, and Vermont, but native species are exempt from the noxious designation in those states.
