= Deep Voll Brook =

Tributary of Goffle Brook and part of the Passaic River in New Jersey, USA

Coordinates: 40°58′09″N 74°09′37″W

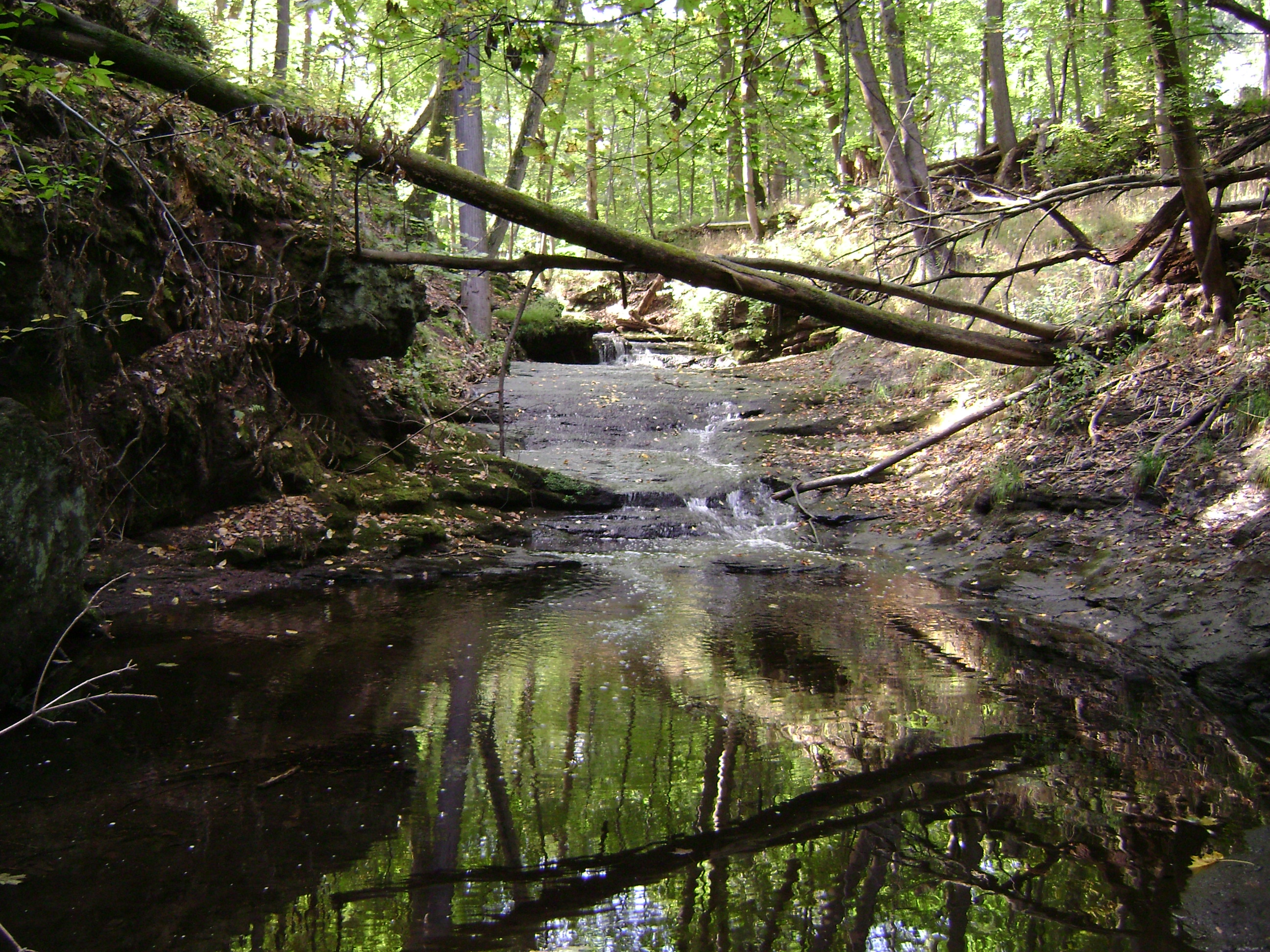
Deep Voll Brook Ravine in Wyckoff

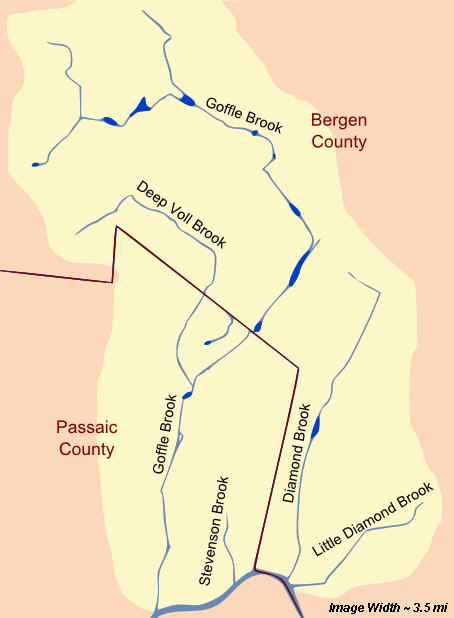
Map of Diamond Brook and Goffle Brook combined drainage basin, including Deep Voll Brook

Deep Voll Brook, also known as Deep Brook (USGS captioned name), is a tributary of Goffle Brook and part of the Passaic River watershed. The brook drains part of the eastern flank of First Watchung Mountain, cutting through portions of Bergen and Passaic county in New Jersey. Heading up the brook from its junction with Goffle Brook, one encounters the towns of Hawthorne and Wyckoff.

== History ==
Deep Voll Brook's name is derived from the Dutch Diepte Voll, which literally translates to Deep Fall. The name is accurate, considering the brook features numerous waterfalls and steep slopes. Prior to the 20th century, the brook was known as Cold Brook, as well as Muksukemuk, its Lenape name. In the modern era, locals in Hawthorne and Wyckoff have simply come to call the brook and its surrounding terrain The Ravine.

Local interest in The Ravine has spiked in recent years as development has threatened its existence. Many, particularly in Wyckoff, have pushed to see the upland terrain around Deep Voll Brook's headwaters preserved as open space.

== See also ==
- List of New Jersey rivers
