= Campgaw Mountain Reservation =

County park in Bergen County, New Jersey, US

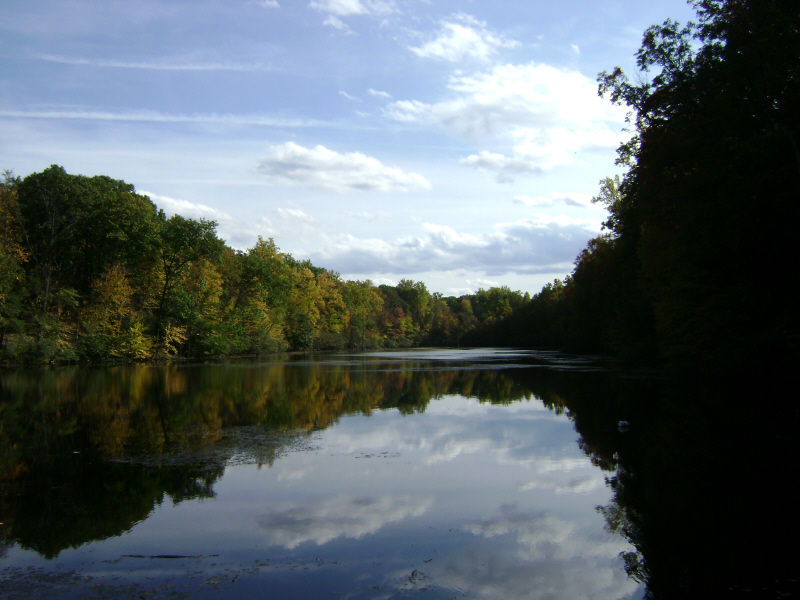
- Fyke Pond in Campgaw Mountain Reservation, Mahwah
- Interactive map of Campgaw Mountain Reservation
- Type: County park
- Location: Franklin Lakes, Mahwah, and Oakland, Bergen County, New Jersey, US
- Coordinates: 41°03′11″N 74°11′58″W
- Area: 1,373 acres (556 ha)
- Created: 1961
- Operator: Bergen County Department of Parks
- Open: All year

Campgaw Mountain Reservation is a 1373-acre (5.6 km^{2}) county park of Bergen County, New Jersey. It is located mostly within Mahwah, but extends into the northeastern part of Oakland (southwest of Glen Gray Road), as well as the northwestern part of Franklin Lakes. The park includes a ski area and the peak of Campgaw Mountain at a 735-foot (224 m) elevation.

The ski area has two 2-person chairlifts and three magic carpet style lifts suitable for novice skiers. The first chairlift was built by HALL ski lift in 1968. Chairlift 2 was built by HALL in 1970, and features a midstation exit for skiers who do not want to go to the top of the mountain. The area also has opened up a section of the smaller hill for patrons to rent inner tubes and slide down to the bottom. There are two handle tow style lifts that drag the tube with the user in it to the starting area. The area also has a small lodge, cafeteria, snack bar, and equipment rental shop. The area is a hangout for local kids from the surrounding area. Many of the skiers are just beginning or are novices at the sport, and the mountain attracts people from the surrounding urban areas as well. It is the closest ski area to New York City. The mountain's highest trail features a vertical drop of 270 feet (82 m) over a distance of about 1,200 feet (370 m). The steepest section of this trail is the first 200 feet (61 m) downhill of the summit. The remaining 1,000 feet (300 m) or so of trail is mostly flat with a smooth decline.

To the east of the park is Interstate 287. To the west of the park is U.S. Highway 202 and the Ramapo River.

In 1955, the U.S. Army created a Nike Missile station there for the defense of the New York Metropolitan Area from strategic bombers. In 1959, the site was upgraded to house Nike-Hercules Missiles with increased range, speed and payload characteristics. The missile site closed in June 1971.

== See also ==
- Campgaw Mountain
