= Watchung Mountains =

Group of three long low ridges in northern New Jersey

- Wach Unks; (formerly) Blue Mountains; Blue Hills
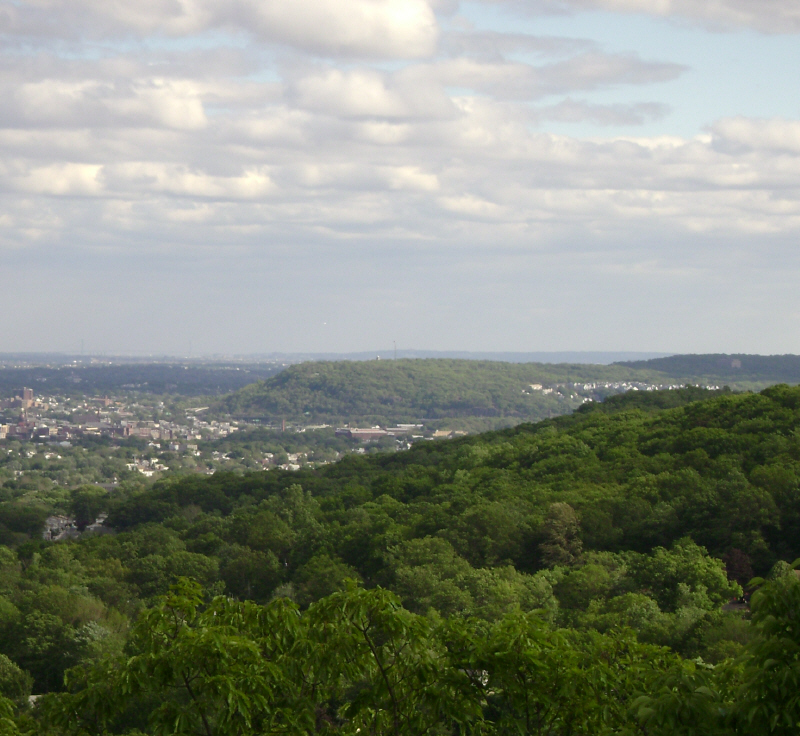
- Garret Mountain and Mount Cecchino seen from High Mountain in Wayne, New Jersey

Highest point
- Peak: High Mountain (Preakness Range)
- Elevation: 879 ft (268 m)
- Coordinates: 40°58′12.26″N 74°11′54.08″W

Dimensions
- Length: 40 mi (64 km) north–south

Geography
- Country: United States of America
- State: New Jersey

Geology
- Rock ages: Triassic; Jurassic
- Rock types: extrusive igneous; trap rock

The Watchung Mountains are a group of three long low ridges of volcanic origin, between 400 and 500 feet (120 and 150 m) high, lying parallel to each other in northern New Jersey in the United States. The name is derived from the American Native Lenape name for them, Wach Unks (High Hills). In the 18th century, the Euro-American settlers also called them the Blue Mountains (Note: Warren Barton Blake's Introduction to his 1912 edition of J. Hector St. John de Crèvecœur's Letters from an American Farmer mentions Crèvecœur's son's farm "at Navesink, near the Blue Mountains".) or Blue Hills (not to be confused with Blue Mountain in Sussex County). The Watchung Mountains are known for their numerous scenic vistas overlooking the skylines of New York City and Newark, New Jersey, as well as their isolated ecosystems containing rare plants, endangered wildlife, rich minerals, and globally imperiled trap rock glade communities. The ridges traditionally contained the westward spread of urbanization, forming a significant geologic barrier beyond the piedmont west of the Hudson River; the city of Newark, for example, once included lands from the Hudson to the base of the mountains. Later treaties moved the boundary to the top of the mountain, to include the springs.

The Watchungs are basalt uplifts, geologically similar to the Palisades along the Hudson River. In many places, however, the mountains have become sinuous islands of natural landscape within the suburban sprawl covering much of contemporary northeastern New Jersey. Parks, preserves, and numerous historical sites dot the valleys and slopes of the mountains, providing recreational and cultural activities to one of the most densely populated regions of the nation.

== Geography ==
The two most prominent ridges, known as First Watchung Mountain (the southeastern ridge) and Second Watchung Mountain (the northwestern ridge), stretch for more than forty miles (64 km) from Somerville (in Somerset County) in the southwest through Morris County, Union County, Essex County, and Passaic County to Mahwah (in Bergen County) in the northeast. Sometimes the less prominent and discontinuous ridge formed by Long Hill, Riker Hill, Hook Mountain, and Packanack Mountain is referred to as Third Watchung Mountain and lies on the northwestern side of Second Watchung Mountain. A parallel series of gaps through all three mountain ridges extends to the west from near Springfield to the northern boundary of Chatham where the Passaic River flows through the Third Watchung Mountain.

Often the entireties of First Watchung Mountain and Second Watchung Mountain are erroneously referred to as Orange Mountain and Preakness Mountain. Historically, the names ‘Orange’ and ‘Preakness’ have only been applied to specific sections of these ridges. The confusion appears to have arisen from the fact that First Watchung Mountain is said to be composed of Orange Mountain basalt, while Second Watchung Mountain is composed of Preakness Mountain basalt. The names applied to the basalts are geologic type localities, that is to say, the type of rock found at Orange Mountain is exclusive to all of First Watchung Mountain, while the type of rock found at Preakness Mountain is exclusive to all of Second Watchung Mountain. Similarly to this misinformation about First Watchung Mountain and Second Watchung Mountain, sometimes the Third Watchung Mountain is confused with its basalt type locality, as on some occasions its entire length is erroneously referred to as Hook Mountain.

In addition to the three main ridges of the Watchungs, a smaller fourth ridge exists south of Morristown and west of Third Watchung Mountain. While attaining elevations more than 400 ft (120 m) above sea level, the ridge lacks topographic prominence, only rising to approximately 100 ft (30 m) above the surrounding terrain. Only one portion of the ridge is named, a southern section underlying Harding Township known as Lees Hill.

All of the ridges lie to the east of the higher Appalachian Mountains, which in northern New Jersey often are referred to as the New York - New Jersey Highlands. Together with the Appalachian Mountains to the west, the Watchungs pen in an area formerly occupied by the prehistoric Glacial Lake Passaic. The Great Swamp, a large portion of which is designated as the Great Swamp National Wildlife Refuge, is a remnant of this glacial lake and presently is retained by Third Watchung Mountain.

Although the Watchungs commonly are described in terms of their east–west ridge arrangement (First Watchung Mountain, Second Watchung Mountain, and Third Watchung Mountain), they also are divided into smaller mountain ranges, as well as various named ridges.

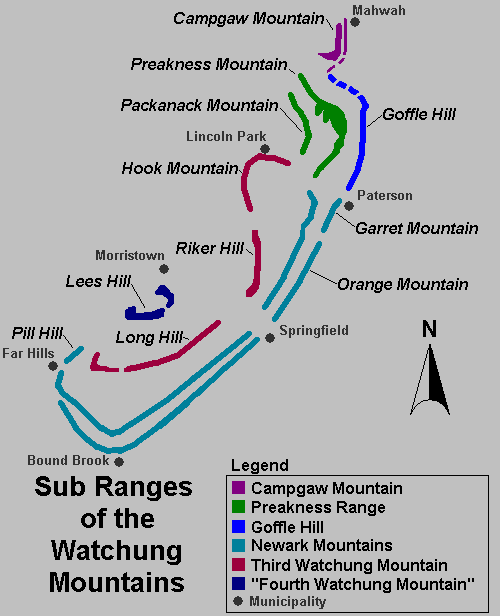
Ranges and ridges of the Watchungs

Notable ranges and ridges of the Watchungs from north to south include:

- Campgaw Mountain is the northernmost ridge of the Watchungs, formed by a combination of First Watchung Mountain and Second Watchung Mountain. Its northern terminus is the Ramapo Mountains, near the New York border. A shallow gap separates its southern end from Preakness Mountain and Goffle Hill.
- Preakness Mountain comprises part of the northern extent of Second Watchung Mountain between the Passaic River and Campgaw Mountain. Along with Packanack Mountain (part of Third Watchung Mountain) to the west, Preakness Mountain forms the Preakness Range. The three highest peaks of the Watchungs are located in this range.
- Goffle Hill (Totoway Mountain hist.), part of First Watchung Mountain, flanks the eastern side of Preakness Mountain. Its northern end is broken by a shallow gap separating it from Campgaw Mountain, while its southern end is divided from Garret Mountain by the Passaic River in Paterson.
- Third Watchung Mountain begins with Packanack Mountain, part of the Preakness Range. The Pompton River separates the south end of Pakanack from the beginning of Towakhow Mountain or Hook Mountain, which runs west-northwest and then turns south to form a curve encircling the Great Piece Meadows along the Passaic River, ending near Pine Brook. To the south, the Rockaway River, the Whippany River, and the Passaic River flow east through a gap in the range that resumes south of Beaufort, New Jersey as Riker Hill. The Passaic River flows west through another gap north of Chatham, below which Long Hill stretches southwest and then west to Millington, where the Passaic River drains the Great Swamp and cuts through the range. Third Watchung extends a short distance west of Millington to Liberty Corner, with a spur, Cedar Hill, jutting northeast at Lyons.
- The Newark Mountains are a historical range, encompassing the ridges of First and Second Watchung Mountain south of the Passaic River. First Watchung Mountain in this range begins in the north as Garret Mountain. South of Garret Mountain is Orange Mountain, which is separated from Garret Mountain by a gap known as the Great Notch. The Hobart Gap (or Millburn Gap), near Springfield, then divides Orange Mountain from the remaining southern part of First Watchung Mountain, which stretches south and then west before terminating near Far Hills. Second Watchung Mountain begins in the northern portion of the Newark Mountains as what is historically known as Caldwell Mountain. The northern terminus of Caldwell Mountain is the Passaic River, while the southern terminus is at the Hobart Gap (or Millburn Gap). South of that gap, Second Watchung Mountain parallels First Watchung Mountain to Far Hills. There, a gap known as Moggy Hollow incises the ridge before it makes a turn to the north. The remaining section of Second Watchung Mountain, known as Pill Hill, then continues a short distance before terminating along the Ramapo Mountains.

Noteworthy summits of the Watchungs include High Mountain, Beech Mountain, and Mount Cecchino in Wayne, which stand at 879 ft (268m), 869 ft (265m) and 755 ft (230m) above sea level. Another notable summit is The Hilltop in Verona, Cedar Grove, and North Caldwell, which peaks at 675 feet (206 m) just east of the water sphere.

== History ==
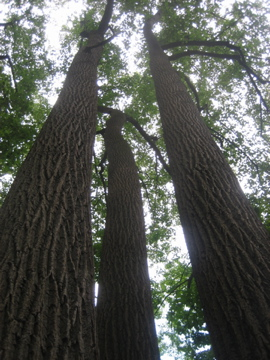
Trees in the Watchung Reservation between the first and second ridges near Summit and Mountainside

The Watchung Mountains formed millions of years ago when the continent of Africa collided with North America. The original inhabitants of the Watchungs, the Lenape, referred to the mountains as the Wach Unks, or ‘high hills’. Evidence of the Lenape presence in the Watchungs can be seen in numerous camps sites that have been uncovered, mainly along the rivers coursing through mountains and in the small caves abundant in the volcanic rock. It is thought that the Lenape favored the Watchungs for their profusion of natural resources, including abundant freshwater rivers and streams, a variety of forests, and plentiful fish and game. They took advantage of the rich soils and maintained many farm areas where they raised a variety of seasonal crops. The Lenape Trail goes along the edge of the cliffs of the Watchung Mountains and the Lenape used the overlooks there as smoke signal locations.

With the arrival of Europeans, the same resources that sustained the indigenous peoples served settlers. Trade in furs to European markets, a bounty of game and fish, and native garden produce for the traders was important during the Dutch colonial period when few settlements occurred. Perhaps most importantly with the settlements established during the English colonial period, the rivers and streams of the Watchungs also supported grain, grist, and saw mills. Later, the energy of these rivers would be harnessed for industry, most notably at the Great Falls of the Passaic River, where mechanical and hydroelectric systems exploited the energy of water falling over the face of First Watchung Mountain.

Outside of providing gradation to rivers and streams, the height of the Watchungs has proven useful for other reasons. In the French and Indian War, the military reused the Lenape signal points, as did Washington later.

Traditional Native American vantage points north and south of the only gap through all three of the Watchung Mountain ridges were used by General Washington to observe English troop movements to and from Manhattan (red) with the relative safety that the mountains provided to his military headquarters at Morristown (blue)

- During the Revolutionary War, General George Washington used the protection of the Watchung mountains to erect the first and second Middlebrook encampments in the Washington Valley between the ridges. This position on the high ground also allowed him to monitor the area between Perth Amboy and New Brunswick as well as to identify and disturb British movements between Manhattan and Philadelphia. During the revolution the signaling beacons along the Watchungs were extended far up the Hudson and to Boston.
- In the twentieth century, the Hilltop in Verona, the highest point in Essex County, served as the site of a sanatorium for tuberculosis patients. The county hospital was built there because the high elevation provided clean, mountain air away from the cities to the east.
- At the height of the Cold War, Campgaw Mountain was selected to house a Nike missile base. Installed on the mountain between 1955 and 1971, the base's missiles served to guard New York City air space, standing by to intercept nuclear armed Soviet bombers. The facility ultimately was abandoned with the advent of intercontinental ballistic missiles. Two other missile sites were nestled into the forests atop peaks in Mountainside and Morris Township, creating a strategic triangle of redundant sites.

== Geology ==
200 million years ago, magma intruded into the Newark Basin, then an active rift basin associated with the breakup of the supercontinent Pangaea. Initially, the magma was contained within the sedimentary strata of the basin, forming large intrusions such as the Palisades Sill, but it ultimately broke out to the surface through large, episodic eruptions. The Watchung Mountains were formed from these eruptions, consisting of three separate flood basalts that may have filled nearly the entire Newark Basin. Each time the basin filled with basalt, which cooled into blocky trap rock, a period of limited volcanic activity followed, allowing sediment to be deposited on top of the previously erupted layer of basalt. In this way, the Newark Basin became layered with alternating strata of Watchung basalt and Jurassic sedimentary rock.

Throughout the early Jurassic, the Newark Basin underwent extensive dipping and folding. The western side of the basin plunged deeper into the crust, tilting the strata of the basin to an angle of between 5 and 25 degrees. Localized deformation of the western edge of the basin along the Ramapo Fault System formed alternating synclines and anticlines that warped the layers of basalt and sedimentary rock.

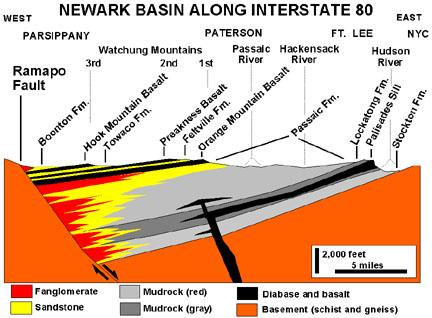
USGS cross-section of the Newark Basin

Erosion began to attack the basin as rifting failed and deposition of new sediments ceased. Over millions of years, erosion ate downward through the tilted rock of the basin, eventually encountering the basalt layers that are significantly more erosion resistant than the surrounding sedimentary rock. The result of this has been that the exposed edges of the eroding basalt layers have managed to persist longer than the exposed edges of the sedimentary layers, causing them to project prominently above the surrounding surface terrain as high ridges.

Today, the flood basalts are preserved in the synclines adjacent to the Ramapo Fault system. It is in these synclines that the basalt layers are thick and warped into downward dipping trap rock sheets, descending below the current erosional surface of the basin. Notably, the synclines preserve not only the basalt layers, but also some overlying Jurassic sedimentary rock. The largest syncline in the basin, the Watchung syncline, contains the greater portion of the Watchung flood basalts as they appear today. The projecting, eroding edges of the flood basalts preserved in the syncline form the three ridges of the Watchung Mountains. Jurassic sedimentary rock layers between and above the three ridges form the Feltville, Towaco, and Boonton formations. Elsewhere in the Newark Basin, smaller synclines preserve the Watchung Outliers, additional fragments of the flood basalts and associated overlying sediments that have survived into the modern era. The Hook Mountain and Preakness layers have undergone hydrothermal alteration causing albitization.

Because the majority of the Watchung Mountains are composed of extrusive igneous trap rock, they display characteristic columnar jointing and stacked lava flows. These features are readily noted along the eastern faces of the ridges that often present mural precipices, or vertical escarpments. Similar features also can be seen in the Palisades Sill, although these were formed within the Earth's crust. Additionally, the Watchungs feature not only blocky aa lava, but also ropey and billowing pahoehoe flows.

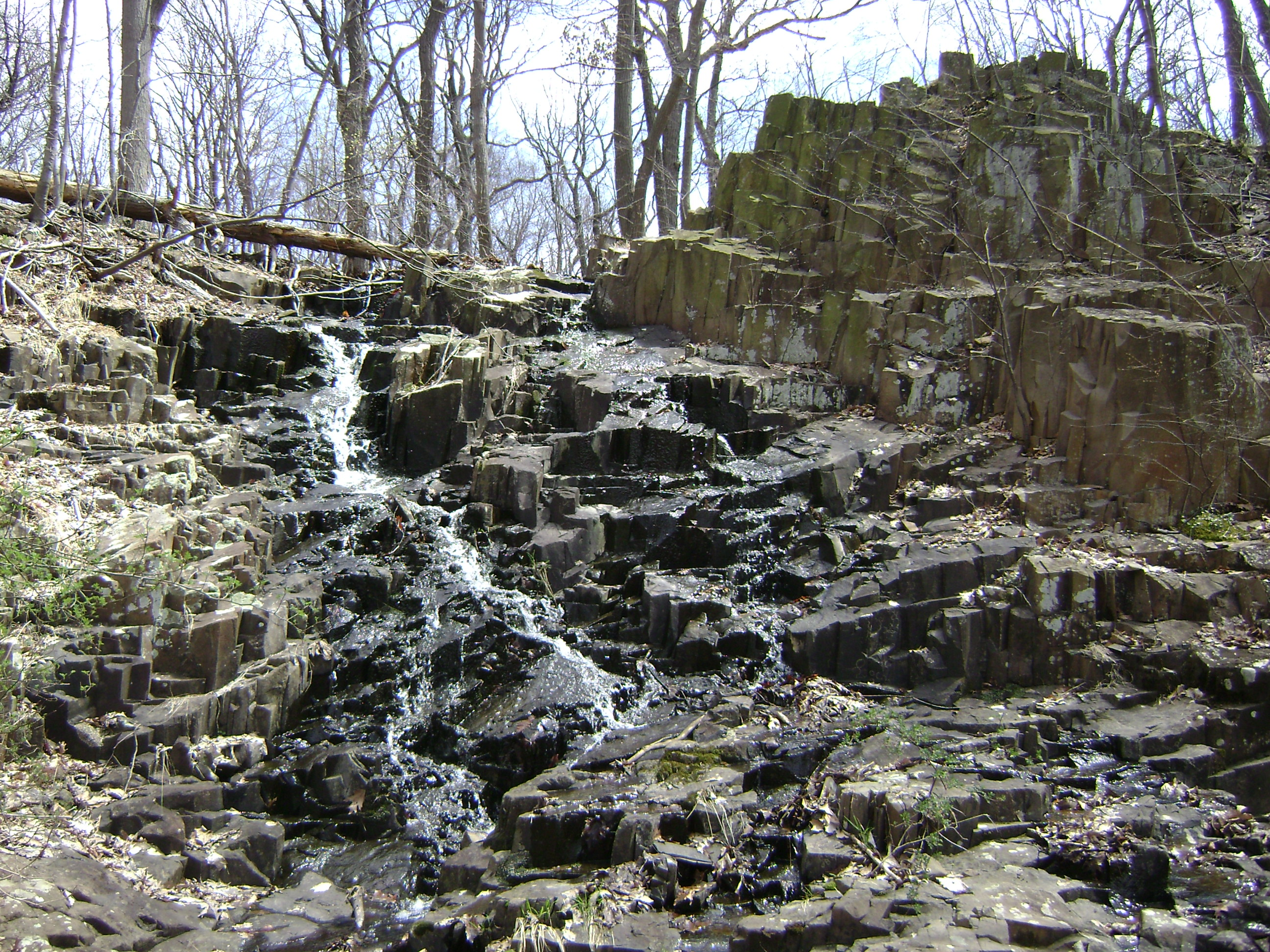
Water flows over a trap rock surface in the Watchungs

The magma that generated the Watchungs and the Palisades also formed the intrusive igneous Sourland Mountain in Central New Jersey, as well as a series of smaller outlying volcanic ridges in the region. Cushetunk Mountain, a ring-shaped volcanic mountain between Sourland Mountain and the Watchungs, is of the same geologic lineage.

The Metacomet Mountains in the Connecticut River Basin, another aborted rift valley, came into existence at approximately the same time as the Watchungs, also through extrusive eruptions. While non-contiguous, the two ranges may be considered geologic cousins, having formed under similar circumstances during the rifting of Pangaea. The same erosive and tectonic forces that elevated the Watchungs, also served to raise the Metacomets.

== Mineralogy ==
The Watchungs are composed principally of volcanic basalt, which historically has been used in railroad beds and road construction. In addition to this, in many places the mountains are underlain by red and white sandstone that, at times, has been used in building construction. Mica and calcareous spar often accompany these sandstone beds.

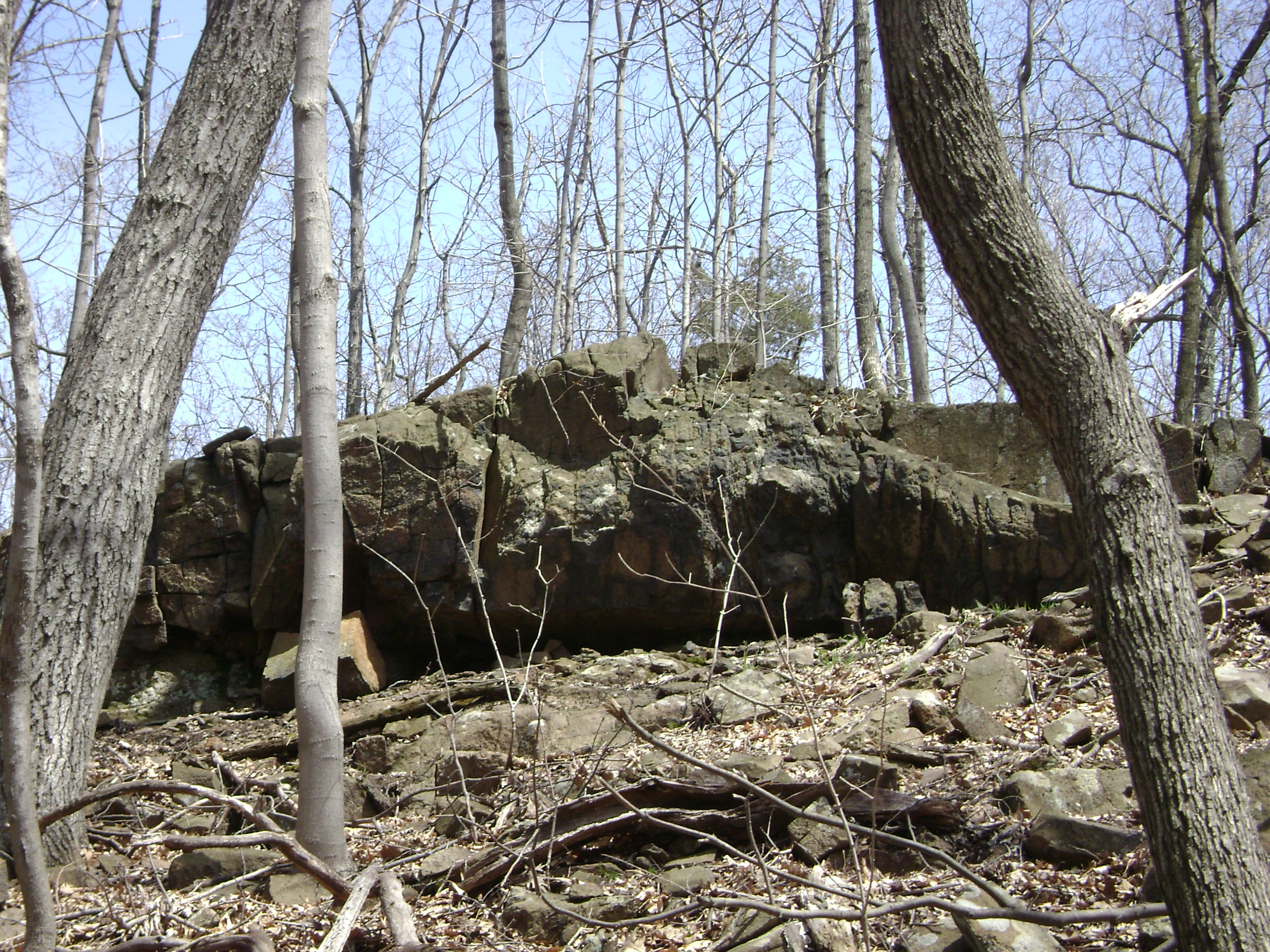
An ancient lava front in the Watchungs bearing embedded agate and quartz nodules

Due to the volcanic nature of the Watchungs, zeolites, including prehnite, analcime, and stilbite, which form from a reaction of mafic rocks in alkaline environments, can be found along exposed ridge lines. Agate, primarily in the form of chalcedony, and crystalline quartz (sometimes in the form of amethyst), are prominent in the ancient lava flows of the Watchungs and typically, are seen as embedded nodules along exposed fronts. Datolite, another nodular mineral, has been found embedded in the volcanic rock around the Great Falls. Additionally, jasper and satin spar are known to exist within the northwestern Preakness Range.

Copper also can be found in the Watchungs. Near Belleville, ore containing 8% copper was discovered, and a copper mine once operated in the area. Other copper bearing ores have been noted near Paterson. These ores typically contain cuprite (red copper oxide) and/or copper carbonate in a matrix of red or gray sandstone. Pyritous copper, also known as chalcopyrite, is not known to exist in ores found in the Watchungs.

== Conservation ==
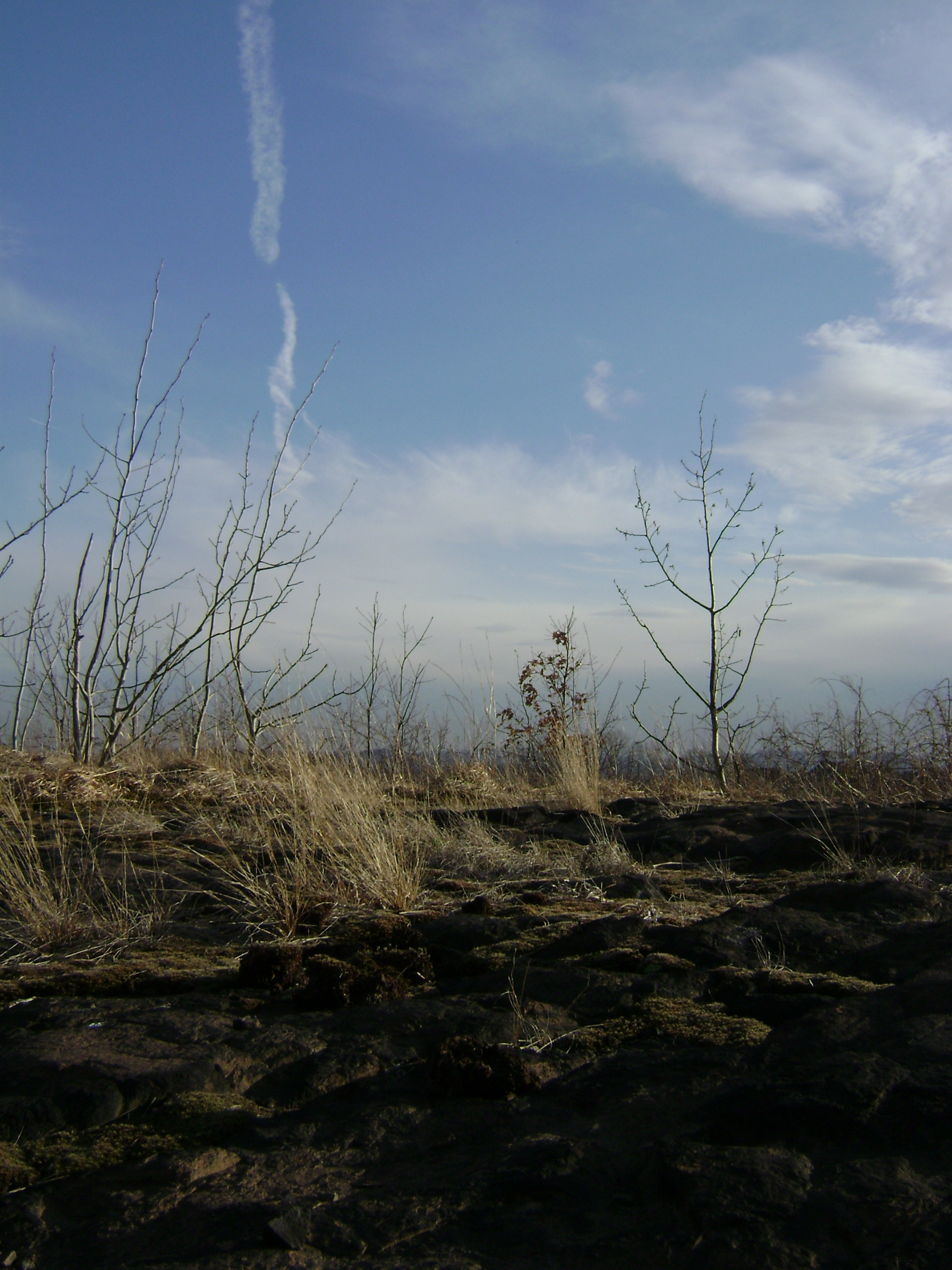
A trap rock glade straddles the summit of First Watchung Mountain

In the mid-twentieth century, the ability of the Watchungs to hold back the spread of urbanization was greatly reduced with the development of the interstate highway system. Three interstate highways, I-80, I-280, and I-78, were built through the Watchungs, allowing midcentury suburban-style development to become economically feasible within its inner valleys and slopes. Near the end of the twentieth century, I-287, a semi-circular beltway enclosed the Watchungs within the bulge of suburbia radiating out from New York City. Many pathways of safe passage through the mountains, retained from the time of the Lenapes, were severed and blocked by the highways.

Today, along the summits of the Watchungs, talus slope environs as well as globally rare trap rock glade/outcrop communities and their unique species have become threatened by development. As a response, efforts to conserve the unique landscapes of the Watchungs have been undertaken. The largest of the conservation efforts so far is High Mountain Park Preserve, which at 1,153.7 acres (4.669 km^{2}) sets aside one of the largest tracts of wilderness in the New Jersey Piedmont. The park is known to contain at least one globally imperiled plant, Torrey's mountain mint (Pycnanthemum torrei), as well as three other plants endangered within New Jersey.

Other large areas of preserved land lie within the valleys of the Watchungs. Retained within the embrace of Third Watchung Mountain, the Great Swamp National Wildlife Refuge consists of 7,600 acres (31 km2) or approximately 12 square miles (30.4 km^{2}) of varied habitats. The refuge was created through the efforts and donations of a small group of local residents in 1959, the Jersey Jetport Site Association, and a Great Swamp Committee later formed within the North American Wildlife Foundation. It is championed by many organizations among the contemporary communities adjacent to the refuge. The Great Swamp, as well as other swamps retained by the Watchungs, including Great Piece Meadows, constitute the remains of Glacial Lake Passaic. The lake existed during the last ice age, eventually draining as a glacier in the northern Watchungs receded and allowed the lake's water to empty out via a gap in the ridges of First Watchung Mountain and Second Watchung Mountain currently occupied by the Passaic River.

General awareness of the history and natural environment of Watchungs has been increased through efforts such as the construction and designation of the Lenape Trail. The trail traverses rugged sections of the mountains while at the same time, connecting various historical sites pertinent to the history of New Jersey.

== Recreation ==
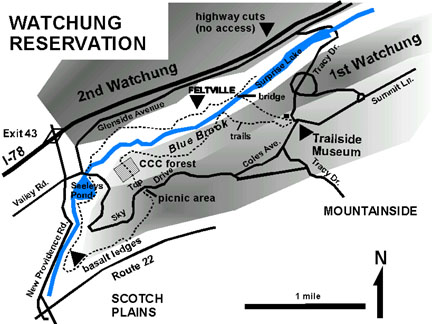
Map showing details of Watchung Reservation

Parks and reservations from north to south:

- Campgaw Mountain Reservation, Campgaw Mountain (First Watchung Mountain and Second Watchung Mountain)
- Franklin Lakes Nature Preserve, Goffle Hill (First Watchung Mountain)
- High Mountain Park Preserve, Preakness Range (Second Watchung Mountain)
- Great Falls State Park Under Development, First Watchung Mountain
- Garret Mountain Reservation, First Watchung Mountain
- Rifle Camp Park, First Watchung Mountain
- Mills Reservation, First Watchung Mountain
- Hilltop Reservation, Second Watchung Mountain
- Eagle Rock Reservation, First Watchung Mountain
- Riker Hill Park, Riker Hill (Third Watchung Mountain)
- Lenape Trail, First Watchung Mountain, Second Watchung Mountain, and Third Watchung Mountain
- South Mountain Reservation, First Watchung Mountain and Second Watchung Mountain
- Watchung Reservation, First Watchung Mountain and Second Watchung Mountain
- Washington Rock State Park, First Watchung Mountain
- Washington Valley Park, First Watchung Mountain
- Leonard J. Buck Garden/Moggy Hollow Natural Area, Second Watchung Mountain

== Gallery ==
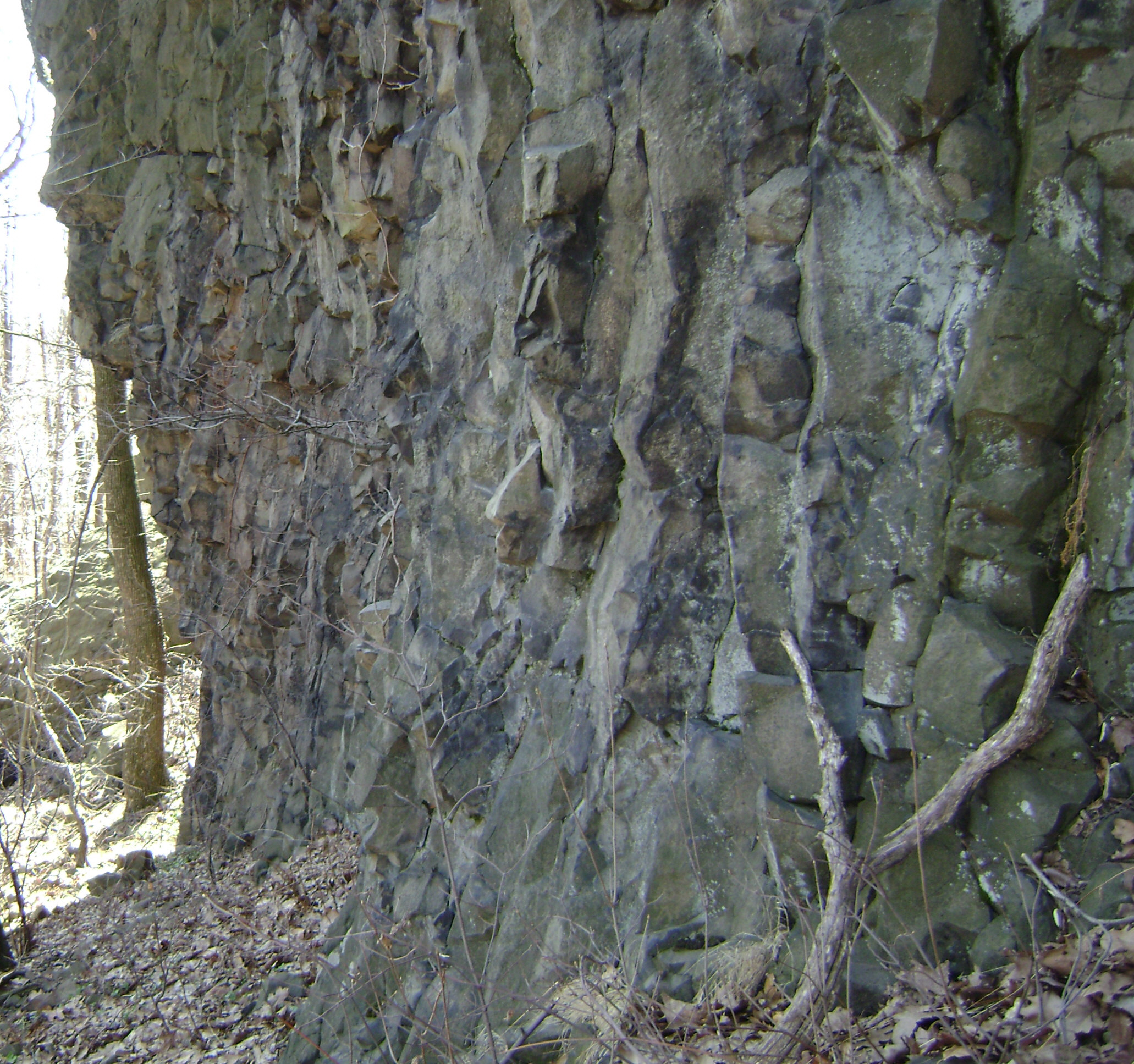
Cliff face on First Watchung Mountain displaying jointed columns of stacked basalt

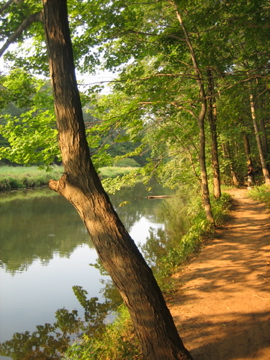
Washington Valley in Bridgewater between the first and second ridge

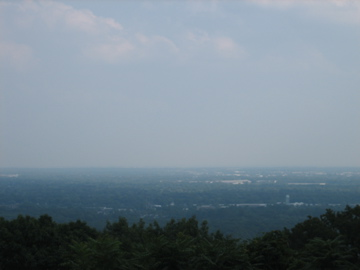
Washington Rock in Green Brook Township, New Jersey

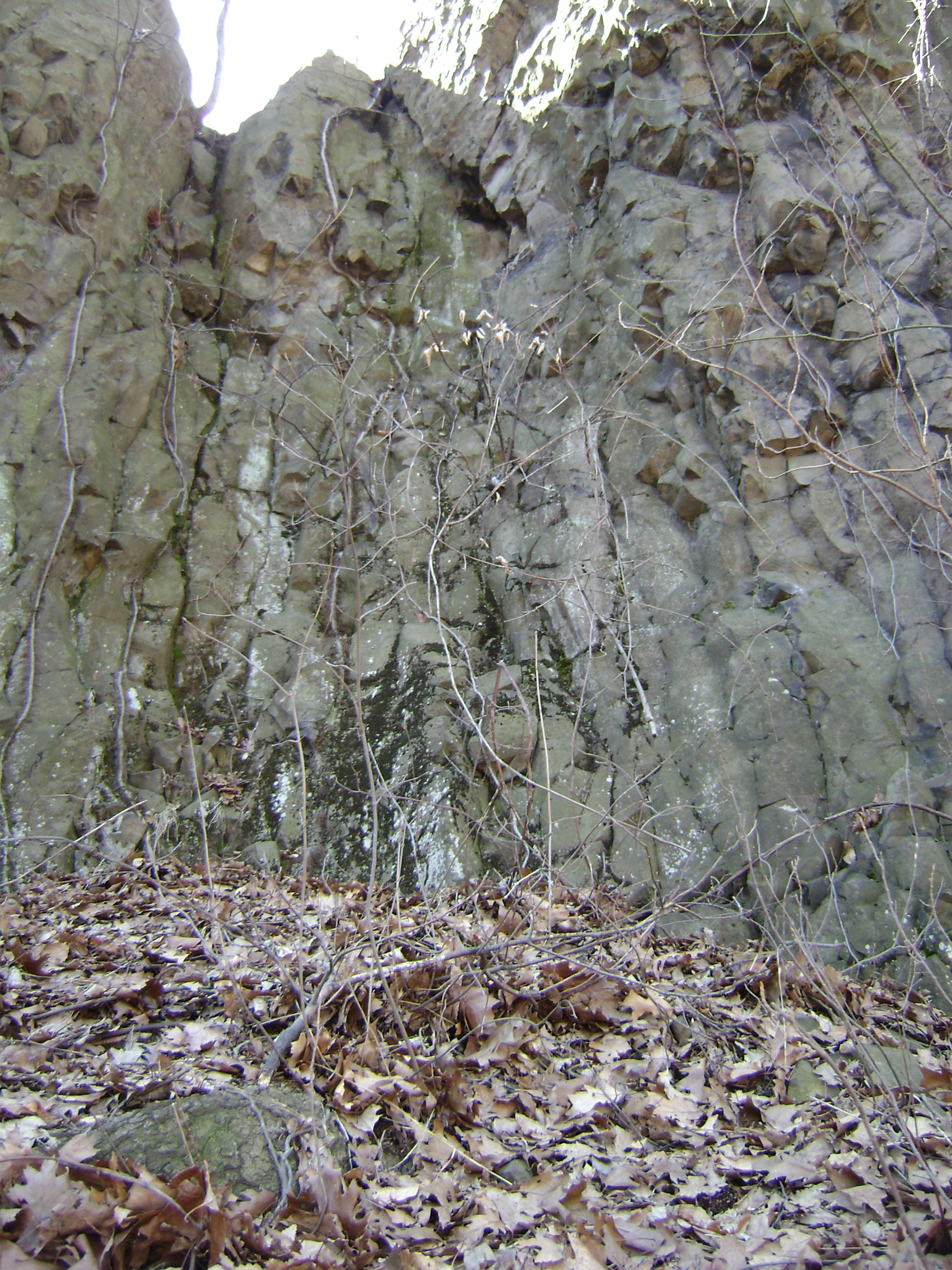
Geology typical of the Watchung Range

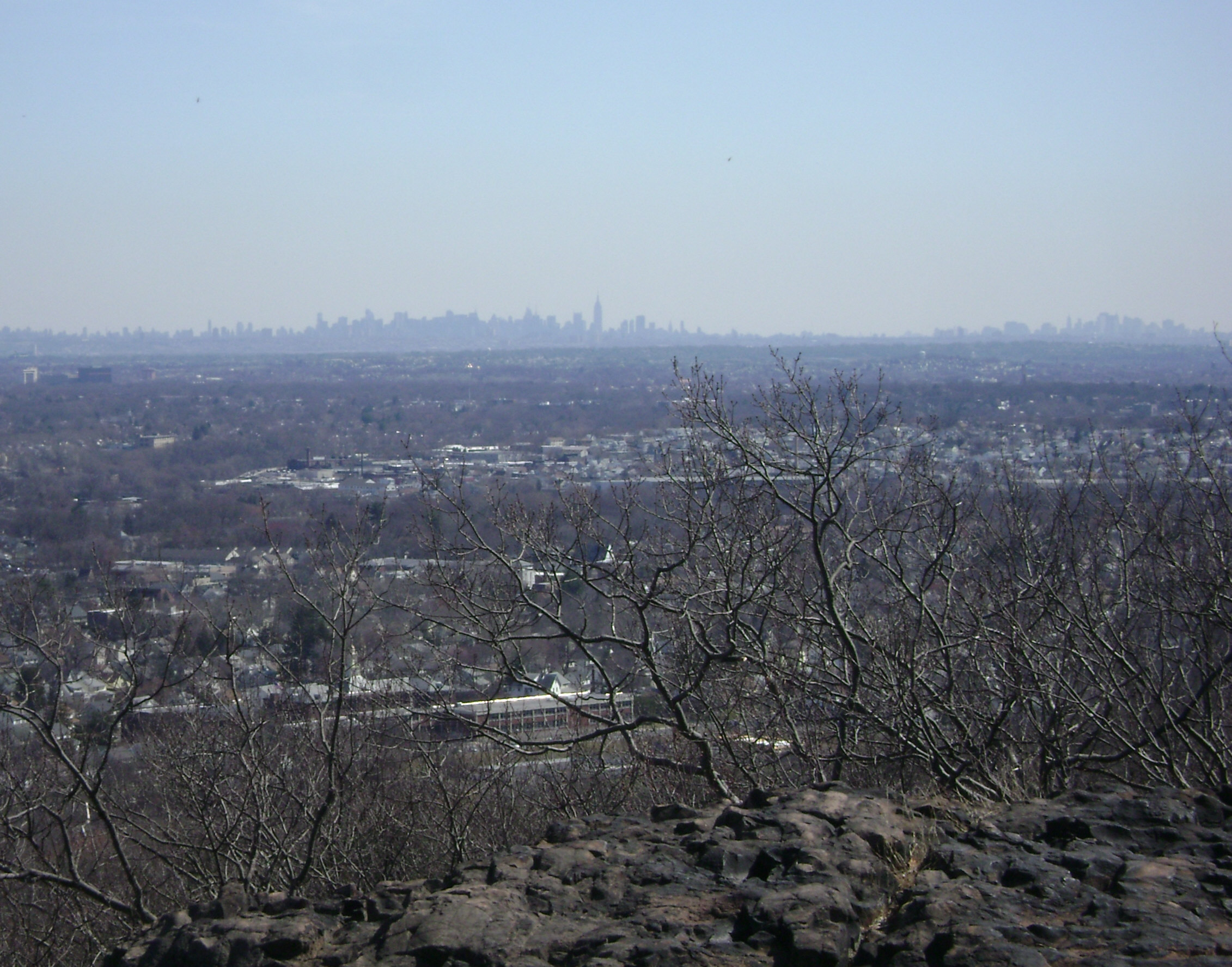
View of Manhattan from First Watchung Mountain

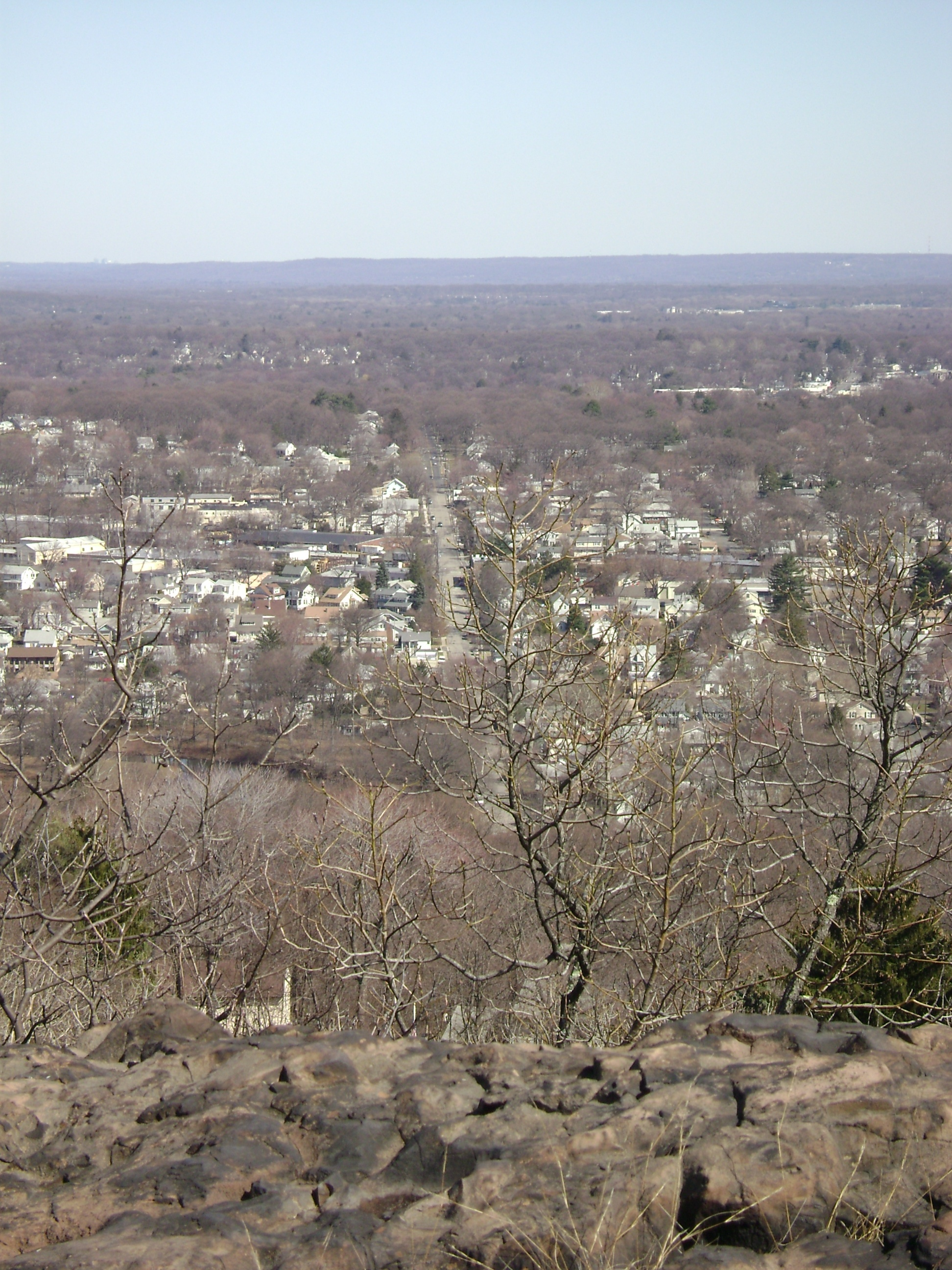
The backside of the Palisades seen from First Watchung Mountain
approximately 13 miles away

== See also ==
- Basalt fan structure
- Cushetunk Mountain, an igneous intrusion south of the Watchungs that also formed during the Mesozoic
- Lake Passaic, a prehistoric proglacial lake held back by the Watchungs
- Metacomet Ridge, a volcanic mountain range in southern New England that formed around the same time as the Watchungs
- Snake Hill, an igneous rock intrusion, probably a volcanic plug, jutting up in the middle of the New Jersey Meadowlands
- Sourland Mountain, a diabase sill and possible continuation of the Watchungs in Hunterdon, Mercer, and Somerset Counties
- Navesink Highlands, a range of steep hills located alongside the Raritan Bay in Monmouth County, the highest headlands along the United States east coast south of Maine
- The Palisades (Hudson River), a nearby volcanic sill that may have formed at the same time as the Watchungs
- Henry Barnard Kümmel, New Jersey State Geologist
