= Preakness Range =

Mountain range in New Jersey, United States

- Watchung Mountains
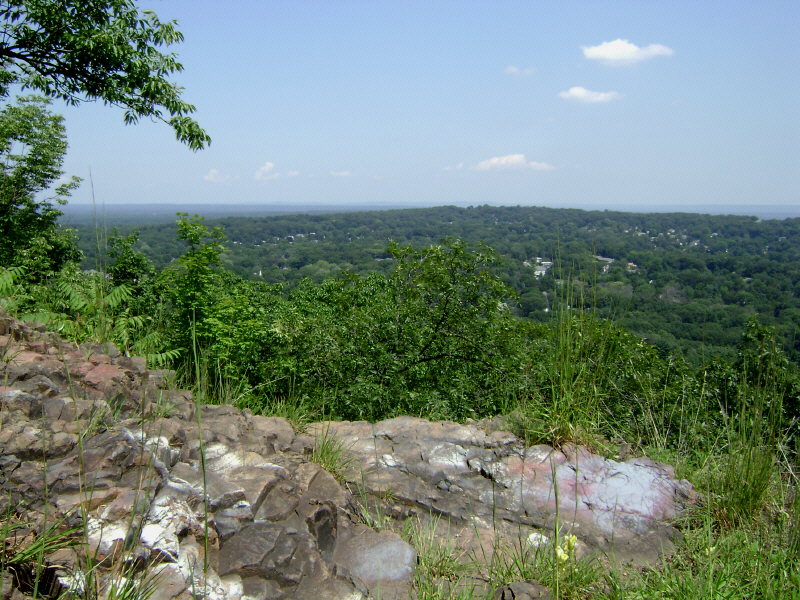
- Goffle Hill can be seen across a valley from a ledge near the summit of High Mountain in Wayne, New Jersey.

Highest point
- Peak: High Mountain
- Elevation: 879 ft (268 m)
- Coordinates: 40°58′12.26″N 74°11′54.08″W

Dimensions
- Length: 11 mi (18 km) northwest–south

Geography
- Country: United States of America
- State: New Jersey

Geology
- Rock ages: Triassic and Jurassic
- Rock types: extrusive igneous and trap rock

The Preakness Range is a range of the trap rock Watchung Mountains on the western edge of the Newark Basin in northern New Jersey. A large portion of this range is included in High Mountain Park Preserve, offering miles of hiking trails with vistas overlooking New Jersey and New York City. The peaks of the Preakness Range, the highest of the Watchung Mountains, shelter endangered ecosystems, including perched wetlands and rare trap rock glade communities.

== Geography ==
The Preakness Range generally refers to the peaks of Preakness Mountain, the section of Second Watchung Mountain north of the Passaic River. Packanack Mountain, a section of Third Watchung Mountain west of Preakness Mountain, is sometimes included in the Preakness Range. Goffle Hill, historically known as Totoway Mountain, flanks the Preakness Range in the east and is usually not included in the range, but it is mentioned in association with it, being part of the northern extent of First Watchung Mountain.

Preakness Mountain begins in Totowa, New Jersey, forming a curve which bows to the north-northeast before sweeping back towards the northwest and terminating near the Ramapo fault in Oakland, New Jersey. The three highest peaks of the Watchungs line the north-central part of Preakness Mountain in Wayne, New Jersey. Mount Cecchino, the southernmost of the three and also the lowest, rises to 755 ft (230m). Immediately to the north, High Mountain reaches 879 ft (268m), becoming the highest peak of the Watchungs. Northwest of High Mountain, the second highest peak of the Watchungs, Beech Mountain, rises to 869 ft (265m).

== History ==
The Preakness Range was originally inhabited by the Munsee (Minsi) Lenape. Today, this Native American heritage lives on in the range's name. Preakness appears to be a modernized form of per-ukunees, a Lenape term thought to mean young buck. For a time, Dutch settlers referred to the range as Harteberg, which appropriately translates to Deer Mountain.

As with the majority of the Watchungs, the Preakness Range saw use as a lookout during the American Revolutionary War. In October and November, 1780 General Arthur St Clair’s men were camped at the base of the mountain.

For most of modern history the Preakness Range remained a wilderness providing recreation to the inhabitants of surrounding towns. Only the southern section of the range was particularly built up, with William Paterson University acting as buffer to hold back development from encroaching northward across the main ridge of Preakness Mountain. In the 1980s, when development began to threaten the remaining wilderness of the range, a push by local citizens to preserve the Preakness Range for the public interest was begun, ultimately resulting in the creation of High Mountain Park Preserve.

== Geology ==
The Preakness Range formed as molten rock extruded onto the surface 200 million years ago. At that time the range occupied the northern section of an active rift valley running through northern and central New Jersey and part of Pennsylvania. After the rift failed in the early Jurassic, the range was elevated as erosion removed the sandstone and shale surrounding the basalt lava flows of Preakness Mountain and Packanack Mountain.

An interesting trait of the Preakness Range is its alternating north-south valleys. These valleys, which form two major divisions, are a result of three separate eruptive events which laid down three closely spaced basalt ridges which combine to form the main section of the Preakness Range on the northern end of Second Watchung Mountain. These ridges decrease in height from east to west, which mirrors the order in which the ridges, really successive sheets of lava, were formed. Here, as in the rest of the Watchungs, the easternmost ridge was extruded first.

== Ecology ==
The Preakness Range may be the most environmentally sensitive section of the Watchungs, hosting a variety of ecologically diverse areas of wilderness. The New Jersey National Heritage Program has given the Preakness Range a rating of B2, meaning it has priority as a site with very high biodiversity significance. Nine different ecological communities have been cited in the Preakness Range, including globally imperiled trap rock glade communities and increasingly rare hickory-ash red cedar woodlands.

Seven state-listed endangered plant species call the Preakness Range home, including a globally endangered species, Torrey's mountain mint (Pycnanthemum torrei). Twelve other rare plants survive in forested uplands and the range's perched wetlands. Some of the rare plants are reasoned to take root in the range due to the calcareous secondary minerals in the range's trap rock which may serve to increase soil alkalinity relative to the surrounding acidic soils of the piedmont region.

The mountains of the Preakness Range also provide significant habitat to wildlife. In particular, sixty species of birds are thought to breed in the range's various environs.

== See also ==
- Goffle Hill, which borders the Preakness Range.
