= Catharpin Creek Formation =

Late Triassic geologic formation in Maryland and Virginia, USA

Bull Run Formation
- Stratigraphic range: Late Triassic, late Norian to Rhaetian
- Type: Geological formation
- Unit of: Chatham Group
- Sub-units: Goose Creek Member
- Underlies: Mount Zion Church Basalt
- Overlies: Bull Run Formation

Lithology
- Primary: sandstone, conglomerate
- Other: shale, siltstone

Location
- Region: Maryland, Virginia
- Country: United States
- Extent: Culpeper Basin

Type section
- Named for: Catharpin Creek, Virginia
- Named by: Lee & Froelich, 1989

The Catharpin Creek Formation is a Late Triassic (late Norian to Rhaetian) geologic formation in Maryland and Virginia. It is found along the western edge of the Culpeper Basin, one of the largest sedimentary basins in the Newark Supergroup. Compared to the underlying Bull Run Formation, the Catharpin Creek Formation is dominated by much coarser sedimentary rocks such as sandstone and conglomerate. The base of the formation is reddish arkosic sandstone, which grades into drabber thin-bedded siltstone and shale in cyclical sequences.

The general depositional environment is reconstructed as a system of active streams running down from alluvial fans which developed along highlands further west of the basin. A few outcrops contain lenses of a conglomerate unit known as the Goose Creek Member. This unit preserves a diverse array of reddish brown to grayish green pebbles and cobbles derived from metamorphic rocks, alongside some sandstone and sandy siltstone. The pebbles and cobbles would have originated from the Proterozoic and Cambrian Catoctin Formation and Chilhowee Group exposed along the Blue Ridge Mountains.

The Catharpin Creek Formation is the youngest fully Triassic unit in the Culpeper Basin, before the occurrence of Triassic-Jurassic basalts associated with eruptions of the Central Atlantic Magmatic Province (CAMP). Based on general stratigraphic characteristics, it is typically considered to be equivalent to the Passaic Formation of the Newark Basin. The estimated age of the Catharpin Creek Formation is late Norian to Rhaetian according to fossils of conchostracans such as Shipingia olseni and Euestheria brodieana.
