= Gwyneddichnium =

Gwyneddichnium Temporal range: Late Triassic

Trace fossil classification
- Domain: Eukaryota
- Kingdom: Animalia
- Phylum: Chordata
- Class: Reptilia
- Clade: Archosauromorpha
- Family: †Tanystropheidae
- Ichnogenus: †Gwyneddichnium; Bock, 1952

Type ichnospecies
- †Gwyneddichnium major

Ichnospecies
- †Gwyneddichnium major

Genus of marine reptile

Gwyneddichnium is an ichnogenus from the Late Triassic of North America and Europe. It represents a form of reptile footprints and trackways, likely produced by small tanystropheids such as Tanytrachelos. Gwyneddichnium includes a single species, Gwyneddichnium major (also spelled G. majore). Two other proposed species, G. elongatum and G. minore, are indistinguishable from G. major apart from their smaller size and minor taphonomic discrepancies. As a result, they are considered junior synonyms of G. major.

== Description ==
Gwyneddichnium corresponds to footprints from a quadrupedal animal with a small pentadactyl (five-fingered) manus (hand) and a notably larger five-toed pes (foot). The manus and pes are mesaxonic, meaning that the third digit is the longest digit, followed by the subequal second and fourth digits. The innermost digit (digit I) and the outermost digit (digit V) were short and located close to the rest of the foot. Sometimes the small fifth digit is poorly preserved, making the hand or foot appear to be tetradactyl (having only four digits). Overall, the digits are long and narrow, with minimal curvature. There is some variation with how the digits are positioned, with some specimens having digits which evenly radiate away from the sole, and others having digits which separate into two clumps, digits I-III and IV-V.

The skin made pad-like impressions with a characteristic nodular shape, and small, pointed claw impressions are also present. Some specimens preserved irregularly-shaped sole impressions and/or tail drag marks, but these are not always preserved. One purported Gwyneddichnium trackway (CU-MWC 159.10) has been interpreted as swimming traces due to the absence of manus prints. Skin webbing appears to be present between toes I-III, though the webbing has also been interpreted as sediment deformation. Gwyneddichnium trackways in general are widely spaced, with pes prints pointing forwards and manus prints rotated outwards. The positions of the pes and manus prints relative to each other are variable, corresponding to different speeds and gaits.

The overall shape of the footprints are similar to Rhynchosauroides, which sometimes occurs alongside Gwyneddichnium. However, Rhynchosauroides has an exaxonic print (with the fourth digit longer than the third), more curvature in the digits, and a fifth digit more widely separated from the fourth.

== Distribution ==
Gwyneddichnium fossils were first collected by Wilhelm Bock at Gwynedd, a railroad outcrop in Montgomery County, Pennsylvania. Gwynedd preserves sediments from the late Triassic Lockatong Formation, part of the Newark Supergroup exposed in the Newark Basin. Bock's specimens, now stored at the Academy of Natural Sciences in Philadelphia, include ANSP 15212 (the holotype of G. major), ANSP 15213 (the paratype of G. major), ANSP 15214 (the holotype of "G. elongatum"), ANSP 15215 (the paratype of "G. elongatum", now considered lost), ANSP 15216 (the holotype of "G. minore"), and ANSP 15217 (the paratype of "G. minore"). Various outcrops throughout Pennsylvania and New Jersey which express the Lockatong Formation continue to produce Gwyneddichnium fossils. Gwyneddichnium is also known to occur within the overlying Passaic Formation. Outside of the Newark Basin, Gwyneddichnium tracks have also been found in the Bull Run Formation (also known as the "Ball's Bluff Siltstone") at Manassas National Battlefield Park in the Culpeper Basin of Virginia. They are also known from the New Oxford or Gettysburg Formation of the Gettysburg Basin in Maryland.

Reports of Gwyneddichnium trackways in the western United States began to surface in the 1990s. These included both typical trackways from walking animals, and unusual swimming trackways which were provisionally referred to the ichnogenus. The earliest western Gwyneddichnium tracks to be discovered hail from several sites in Northeast Utah and Northwest Colorado. Many of these sites lie within the boundaries of Dinosaur National Monument. The sites in the area preserve the Rock Point Member of the upper Triassic Chinle Formation, though they were originally reported as representing the age-equivalent Popo Agie Formation. Possible Gwyneddichnium prints are also known from the Chinle Formation's Owl Creek Member. These rare fossils were found at Brinkerhof Spring, a site in south-central Utah near Capitol Reef National Park. Brinkerhof Spring is located in Circle Cliffs, a natural amphitheater formerly protected within the boundaries of Grand Staircase-Escalante National Monument, but excluded when the monument was shrunk in 2017.

In 2007, a new ichnogenus and ichnospecies, Apachepus cottonorum, was named from the Redonda Formation of New Mexico. However, Apachepus cottonorum was subsequently considered a species of Gwyneddichnium (Gwyneddichnium cottonorum) after pentadactyl manus prints were discovered. G. cottonorum was distinguished from G. major by its larger size and more evenly spaced digits. Further sampling has suggested that these differences are not as clear-cut as suggested, so Gwyneddichnium cottonorum is currently considered a junior synonym of Gwyneddichnium majore.

The only locale outside the United States known to produce Gwyneddichnium prints is the Berndorf site in Germany. Berndorf is located near Kemnath in Bavaria and preserves a clastic portion of the lower Muschelkalk known as the Eschenbach Formation. The rocks of the Eschenbach Formation are from the lower middle Triassic (Anisian stage), making their prints the oldest known Gwyneddichnium fossils.

== Trackmaker ==
Gwyneddichnium was originally tentatively suggested as being created by small pseudosuchians. The discovery of the small tanystropheid archosauromorph Tanytrachelos provided a more specific and well-supported trackmaker for Gwyneddichnium. Tanytrachelos and other tanystropheids have an unusual metatarsal-like phalange in the fifth toe which points forwards (like that of Gwyneddichnium) rather than curves back like other reptiles. Tanytrachelos in particular is the most likely trackmaker due to its wide gait, small size, co-occurrence with the tracks, and feet with a fourth digit shorter than the third. Though Tanytrachelos is by far the most commonly considered trackmaker for Gwyneddichnium, small drepanosaurs such as Hypuronector or Dolabrosaurus have also been proposed as trackmakers. This is considered unlikely due to their unusual morphology. At least in the Chinle and Redonda formations, small lepidosauromorphs have been suggested as trackmakers for Gwyneddichnium.
