= Central Atlantic magmatic province =

Largest continental igneous province on Earth

Central Atlantic magmatic province CAMP
- Large igneous province
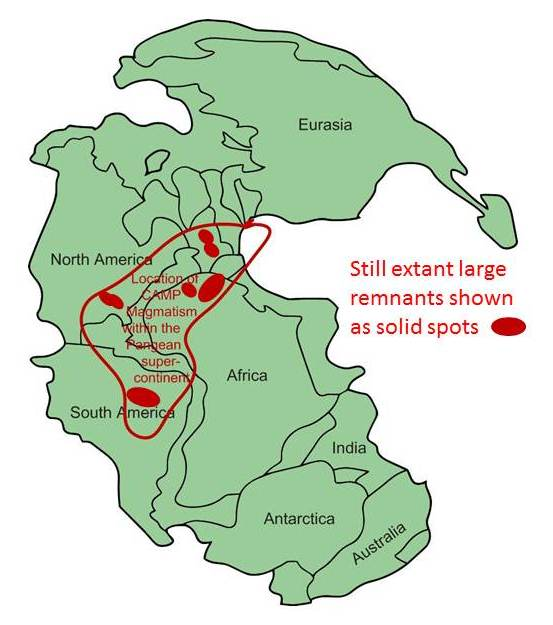
- Location of large residual elements of the CAMP
- Location: Central North Atlantic Ocean, northwest Africa, southwest Europe, northeast South & southeast North America
- Age: latest Triassic-Early Jurassic

Area
  - Total: 11,000,000 km^{2} (1.2×10^{14} sq ft)

Dimensions
  - Length: 5,000 km (3,100 mi)
  - Width: 2,500 km (1,600 mi)
- Last eruption: 201.36 ± 0.02 Ma.

The Central Atlantic magmatic province (CAMP) is the Earth's largest continental large igneous province (LIP), covering an area of roughly 11 million km^{2} (4.2 million sq mi). It is composed mainly of basalt that formed before Pangea broke up in the Mesozoic Era, near the end of the Triassic and the beginning of the Jurassic periods. The subsequent breakup of Pangea created the Atlantic Ocean, but the massive igneous upwelling provided a legacy of basaltic dikes, sills, and lavas now spread over a vast area around the present central North Atlantic Ocean, including large deposits in northwest Africa, southwest Europe, as well as northeast South America and southeast North America (found as continental tholeiitic basalts in subaerial flows and intrusive bodies). The name and CAMP acronym were proposed by Andrea Marzoli (Marzoli et al. 1999) and adopted at a symposium held at the 1999 Spring Meeting of the American Geophysical Union.

The CAMP volcanic eruptions occurred about 201 million years ago and had four separate eruptive cycles. Each pulse lasted no more than 100 years each, spread out over ~600,000 years. The resulting large igneous province is, in area covered, the most extensive on Earth. The eruptive volume is between two and six million cubic kilometres, making it one of the most voluminous eruptions in Earth's history. Some research shows that mafic eruptions started as early as 100 kya prior to the main pulse eruptions began.

This geologic event is associated with the Triassic–Jurassic extinction event.

== Formation of Pangea ==
Pangea was the most recent supercontinent that existed. Its formation and breakup is a part of the larger supercontinent cycle and the Wilson cycle. After the rifting and breakup of the previous supercontinent Rodinia (825-740 Ma), new oceans opened, which included the Iapetus Ocean and the Rheic Oceans. Around 600-550 Ma, these oceans began to close due to subduction zones, which began the formation of Pangea.

Pangea was assembled by the accretion of island arc terranes to the Laurentian margins. This was done by multiple subduction related volcanic island arcs which moved from Africa (Gondwana) and collided with North and South America (Laurentia). This process played out between 600-320 Ma, and was a key component in the eventual eruptions of the CAMP basalts.

== Breakup of Pangea ==
By ~300 Ma, Pangea was fully formed. The teconic and acadian orogenies were complete, and the alleghanian orogeny was actively building up the Appalachian Mountains.

=== 252 Ma and the Siberian Traps ===
The process of Pangea's breakup can loosely be traced back to ~252 Ma. As Pangea relaxed, magma was able to find its way to the surface in one of the largest eruptions in Earth's history, known as the Siberian Traps. Similar to the later CAMP eruptions, the Siberian Traps erupted (~ 4 × 10^{6} km^{3}) of lava. The cause of the Siberian Traps is still debated. While most scientists attribute the eruption as a deep mantle plume, there is also strong evidence against the plume theory and leaning towards a plate tectonic cause.

Around 300 Ma, subduction started in the Paleotethys Ocean. Coupled with ongoing strong slab pull around Pangea from subduction zones in the Panthalassa Ocean, there was net extensional pull on Pangea. The Siberian Traps are thought to have been the first lithospheric failure due to subduction and slab pull.

=== Localized extension, rift valleys, and the lead-up to CAMP volcanism ===
Shortly after the end of the Siberian Traps eruption, around 247 Ma, rift valleys began to take shape. Rift valley sediments, dating to 247 Ma, have been found in the Fundy basin and the Argana basins. By 230 Ma, new passive rift valleys formed, deepened, and filled with sediment. Large rift lakes were also established with their own Van Houten cycles. The CAMP rift valley basins (such as the Culpeper, Dan river, South Georgia rift, Hartford, Gettysburg basins in the US, and Central High Atlas, Middle Atlas, Berrechid, Essaouira and the Doukkala basins in Morocco), formed over old suture zones created by Rodinia and Pangea. Later, magma would use these zones of weakness as an easy route to the surface.

Between ~227-202 Ma, deep, half graben rift basins were well established and localized. This is also when Newark rift basins were deep with their own rift lake systems. By 201.635±0.029 Myr, (around 100,000 years prior to eruptions), there were well established large mafic magma bodies.

== Connected magma flows ==
Although some connections among these basalts had long been recognized, in 1988 they were linked as constituting a single major flood basalt province. The basaltic sills of similar age (near 200 Ma, or earliest Jurassic) and composition (intermediate-Ti quartz tholeiite) which occur across the Amazon River basin of Brazil were linked to the province in 1999. Remnants of CAMP have been identified on four continents (Africa, Europe, North America and South America) and consist of tholeiitic basalts formed during the opening of the Atlantic Ocean basin during the breakup of the Pangean supercontinent.

== Eruptions ==
Eruptions took place in a similar cycle across most rift valleys (spread out over 600 kyrs): a period prior to eruptions of sedimentation inside rift valleys, followed by a short but extremely high volume basaltic fissure eruptive phase, (less than 100 years in duration), followed by a few thousand years of sedimentation, followed by another high volume basaltic eruption lasting no more than 100 years, etc.

Using the Culpeper Basin as an example, the sediment Midland Formation lies just above the initial pulse of volcanism, the Mount Zion Church Basalt (201.566 ± 0.031 Ma). The Midland Formation is 500–984 ft thick and dates ~40 kyrs between eruptive pulses. This was enough time to establish rift lakes and new ecosystems (many Van Houten lake cycles). The Van Houten lake cycle is the geological life cycle of a lake, which includes: lake transgression (rising), high-stand (maximum depth), and regression (falling).

At the end of the sedimentation period, the second eruptive sequence began (the Hickory Grove Basalt: (~201.3–201.4 Ma)). This was another volumous, sub-~100 year eruptive cycle.

The next sedimentation cycle is known as the Turkey Run Formation. This was a much longer sedimentation period lasting 550 kyrs. It consists of dark-red to greenish-gray ripple laminated, cross-bedded sandstone, siltstone, and shale. It's 0.5 to 1.5 km (0.3 to 1 mi) wide and 63 km (39 mi) long, measuring 150 m to 330 m (500 to 1100 ft) in thickness. There is evidence for rift lakes in shallower, wave-reworked lake deposits that were intermittently sub-aerially exposed and desiccated.

The youngest eruption in the cycle is the Sander Basalt, which ages to 201.5±1.3Ma. There were four or more separate basaltic flows during this cycle, with thickness ranges of 140 to 600 m (460 to 2,000 ft).

== Connection with the Triassic-Jurassic boundary and the associated mass extinction event ==
In 2013 the CAMP's connection to the end-Triassic extinction, with major extinctions that enabled dinosaur domination of land, became more firmly established. Until 2013, the uncertainties in the geochronologic dates had been too coarse to confirm that the volcanic eruptions were correlated with major climate changes. The work by Blackburn et al.,using zircon uranium-lead (U-Pb) dating, demonstrated a tight synchroneity between the earliest volcanism and extinction of large populations. They further demonstrated that the magmatic eruptions, as well as the accompanying atmospheric changes, were split into four pulses lasting for over ~600,000 years.

Before that integration, two hypotheses were in debate. One hypothesis was based largely on studies on Triassic-Jurassic basins from Morocco, where CAMP lava flows are outcropping, whereas the other was based on end-Triassic extinction data from eastern North American basins and lava flows showing an extremely large turnover in fossil pollen, spores (sporomorphs), and vertebrates, respectively.

== Geographical extent ==
The province has been described as extending within Pangea from present-day central Brazil northeastward about 5,000 kilometres (3,100 mi) across western Africa, Iberia, and northwestern France, and from the interior of western Africa westward for 2,500 kilometres (1,600 mi) through eastern and southern North America. If not the largest province by volume, the CAMP certainly encompasses the greatest area known of any continental large igneous province, roughly 11,000,000 square kilometres (4,200,000 sq mi).

Nearly all CAMP rocks are tholeiitic in composition, with widely separated areas where basalt flows are preserved. There are also large groups of diabase (dolerite) sills or sheets, small lopoliths, and dikes throughout the province. Dikes occur in large individual swarms with particular compositions and orientations. CAMP activity is apparently related to the rifting and breakup of Pangea during the Late Triassic through Early Jurassic periods, and the enormous province size, varieties of basalt, and brief time span of CAMP magmatism invite speculation about mantle processes that could produce such a magmatic event, as well as rift a supercontinent.

=== Morocco ===
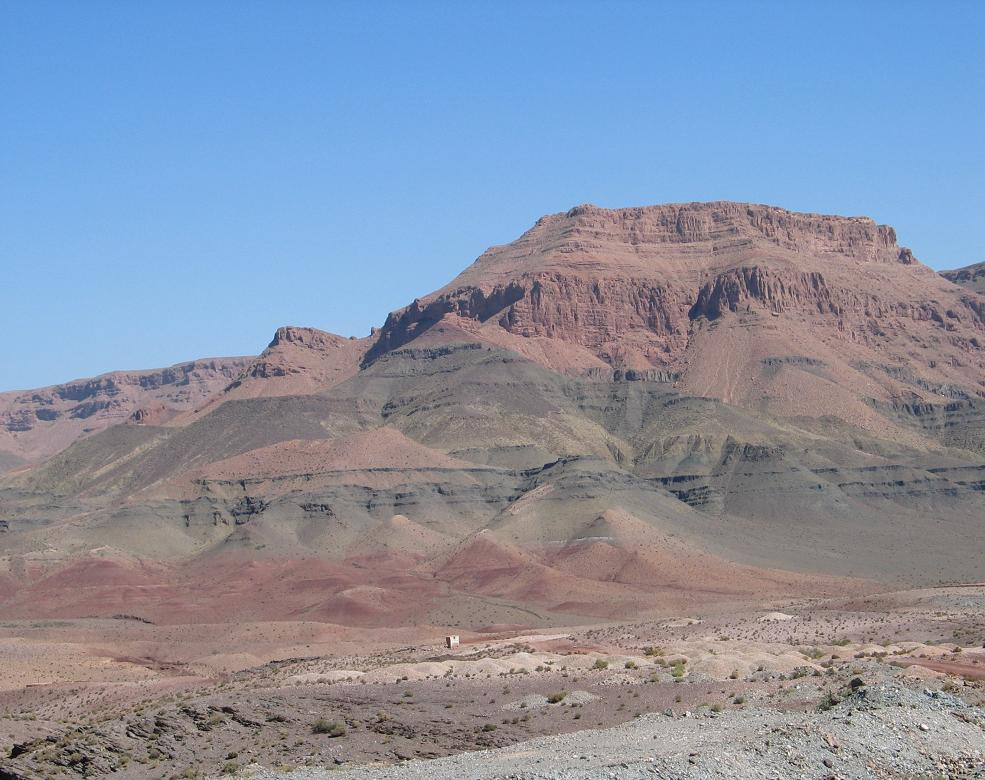
A basaltic lava flow section from the Middle Atlas, Morocco

The thickest lava flow sequences of the African CAMP are in Morocco, where there are basaltic lava piles more than 300 metres thick. The most-studied area is Central High Atlas, where the best preserved and most complete basaltic lava piles are exposed. According to geochemical, petrographic and isotopic data, four distinct tholeiitic basaltic units are recognized, and can be placed throughout the Central High Atlas: Lower, Intermediate, Upper and Recurrent basalts.

The Lower and Intermediate units are constituted by basaltic andesites, whereas the Upper and Recurrent units have basaltic composition. From Lower to Recurrent unit, we observe:

- a progressive decrease of eruption rate (the Lower and the Intermediate units represent over 80% of preserved lava volume);
- a trend going from intersertal to porphyritic texture;
- a progressive depletion of incompatible element contents in the basalts, possibly linked to a progressive depletion of their mantle source.

==== Isotopic analyses ====
Ages were determined by ^{40}Ar/^{39}Ar analysis on plagioclase. These data show indistinguishable ages (199.5±0.5 Ma) from Lower to Upper lava flows, from central to northern Morocco. Therefore, CAMP was a short, intense magmatic event. Basalts of the Recurrent unit are slightly younger (mean age: 197±1 Ma), and represent a late event. Consistently, the Upper and Recurrent basalts are separated by a sedimentary layer that reaches a local thickness of about 80 metres (260 ft).

==== Magnetostratigraphy ====
According to magnetostratigraphic data, the Moroccan CAMP events were divided into five groups, differing in paleomagnetic orientations (declination and inclination). Each group is composed by a smaller number of lava flows (i.e., a lower volume) than the preceding one. These data suggest that there were five short magma pulses and eruption events, each one possibly <400 (?) years long. All lava flow sequences are characterized by normal polarity, except for a brief paleomagnetic reversal yielded by one lava flow and by a localized interlayered limestone in two distinct section of the High Atlas CAMP.

==== Palynological analyses ====
Palynological data from sedimentary layers samples at the base of four lava flow sequences constrain the onset of the CAMP, since there is no evidence of depositional hiatus or tectonic deformation at the bottom of the lava flow piles. The palynological assemblage observed in these basal layers is typical of Late Triassic age, similar to that of the uppermost Triassic sedimentary rocks of eastern North America. Samples from interlayered limestone in lava flows provided unreliable palynological data. One limestone bed from the top to the central High Atlas upper basalts yielded a Late Triassic palynological assemblage. However, the observed sporomorphs in this sample are rare and poorly preserved.

==== Conclusions ====
All of these data indicate that the basaltic lava flows of the Central Atlantic magmatic province in Morocco were erupted at c. 200 Ma and spanned the Tr-J boundary. Thus, it is very possible that there is a connection between this magmatic event and the Tr-J boundary climatic and biotic crisis that led to the mass-extinction.

=== Eastern North America ===
Basal contact of the North Mountain section of Fundy basin, Nova Scotia, Canada

The North American portion of the CAMP lava flows and igneous intrusions crop out in various sections in the basins of Newark, Culpeper, Hartford, Deerfield, the Newark Supergroup, the Fundy Basin, the Dan River Group, and the Deep River Group. The CAMP is here constituted by rare olivine- and common quartz-normative basalts showing a great lateral extension and a maximum thickness up to 1 km. The basaltic flows occur on top of continental fluvial and lacustrine sedimentary units of Triassic age. ^{40}Ar/^{39}Ar data (on plagioclase) for these basaltic units indicate an absolute age of 198–200 Ma bringing this magmatic event close to the Tr-J boundary. Thus it is necessary to determine whether it straddles the boundary or not. If not, then the CAMP could not be a cause of the late Triassic extinction event.

==== Magnetostratigraphy ====
In the Newark Basin, a magnetic reversal (E23r) is observed just below the oldest basalts and more or less in the same position as a palynologic turnover, interpreted as the Tr-J boundary. In Morocco, two reversals have been detected in two lava flow sequences. Two distinct correlations between the Moroccan and the Newark magnetostratigraphy have been proposed. Marzoli et al. (2004) suggest that the Tr-J boundary is located above the lower reverse polarity level which is positioned more or less at the base of the Intermediate basalt unit of Morocco. These two levels can be correlated with chron E23r of the Newark Basin; therefore the North American CAMP Basalts postdate the Tr–J boundary whereas part of the Moroccan CAMP erupted within the Triassic. Contrarily, Whiteside et al. (2007) propose that these two levels could be earliest Jurassic intervals of reverse polarity not sampled in the Newark Basin Sequence (many more lava flows are present in the Moroccan Succession than in the Newark Basin), but observed in Early Jurassic sedimentary sequences of the Paris Basin of France. Reverse polarity intervals in America could be present within North Mountain (Fundy basin, Nova Scotia), which are poorly sampled, even if previous magneto stratigraphy analysis in this sequence showed only normal polarity, or in the Scots Bay Member of the Fundy basin which have never been sampled. There is only one outcrop in the CAMP of America where reverse polarity is observable: a CAMP–related (about 200 Ma) dike in North Carolina. Whiteside et al. (2007) suggest that reverse polarity intervals in this dike could be of post Triassic age and correlated with the same events in Morocco.

==== Palynological analyses ====
The Tr-J boundary is not officially defined, but most workers recognize it in continental strata by the last appearance of index taxa such as Ovalipollis ovalis, Vallasporites ignatii and Patinasporites densus or, in marine sections, by the first appearance of the ammonite Psiloceras planorbis. In the Newark basin the palynological turnover event (hence the Tr-J boundary mass extinction) occurs below the oldest CAMP lava flows. The same can be said for the Fundy, Hartford and Deerfield Basins. In the investigated Moroccan CAMP sections (Central High Atlas Basin), sedimentary layers sampled immediately below the oldest basaltic lava flows apparently contain Triassic taxa (e.g., P. densus), and were thus defined as Triassic in age. A different interpretation is suggested by Whiteside et al. (2007): the sampled sedimentary strata are quite deformed, and this can mean that some sedimentary units could be lacking (eroded or structurally omitted). With respect to the Triassic pollens found in some sedimentary units above the Upper Unit basalts, they could have been reworked, so they don't represent a completely reliable constraint.

==== Geochemical analyses ====
CAMP lava flows of North America can be geochemically separated in three units: the older ones are classified as high titanium quartz normative (HTQ) basalts (TiO_{2} = 1.0-1.3 wt%), followed by lava flows classified as low titanium quartz normative (LTQ) basalts (TiO_{2} = ca. 0.8-1.3 wt%), and then the youngest lava flow unit is classified as high titanium iron quartz normative (HTIQ) basalts (TiO_{2} = 1.4-1.6 wt%). According to Whiteside et al. (2007), geochemical analyses based upon titanium, magnesium and silicon contents show a certain correlation between the lower North American lava flows and the Lower Unit of the Moroccan CAMP, thus reinforcing the conclusion that the Moroccan basalts postdate the Tr-J boundary. Therefore, according to these data, CAMP basalts should not be included among the direct causes of the Tr-J mass extinction.
