= Dan River Group =

Geologic group in the United States

- Stratigraphic range: Late Triassic
- Type: Half graben rift basin; principle normal fault zone on the northwest basin margin.
- Unit of: Newark Supergroup
- Sub-units: Stoneville Formation, Cow Branch Formation, Leaksville Formation, Dry Fork Formation, Walnut Cove Formation, Pine Hall Formation
- Area: 126,300 acres
- Thickness: 5,000-8,000 ft

Location
- Region: Virginia, North Carolina
- Country: United States

Type section
- Named for: Dan River
- Named by: Thayer (1970)

The Dan River Group is a geologic group in Virginia and North Carolina associated with the initial rifting of the supercontinent Pangea. Consisting of nearly 15,000 feet of conglomerate, sandstone, and mudrock overlain in an unconformity on top of older metamorphic rocks that is in fault contact with, it is located on the southern end of a much larger rift valley sequence (the Newark Supergroup.) This together formed the Central Atlantic Magmatic Province (CAMP); an extremely large flood basalt eruption that occurred around 201 Ma, causing the Triassic-Jurassic extinction event. It preserves fossils dating back to the Triassic period.

== Formations ==
It contains six geological formations:

- Stoneville Formation (cyclical red mudstone). Sedimentary layer around 600 ft.
- Leaksville Formation (Predominantly red mudstone.)
- Cow Branch Formation (cyclical fossiliferous black/dark grey mudstone with rare coarser lithologies). Sedimentary thickness is around 545 ft.
- Dry Fork Formation (cyclical tan/red sandstone and grey/purple/red mudstone)
- Walnut Cove Formation (cyclical black/grey mudstone, sandstone, and coal)
- Pine Hall Formation (coarse tan sandstone and red mudstone). Its thickness ranges between 524-2,000 feet in depth.

== Volcanism ==
While the exact extent of lava erupted in the Dan River formation is not known, there is evidence of diabase dikes/sills found here. These magma bodies heated the ground around them, causing sedimentary rocks and coal to alter; a process known as contact metamorphosis. The extent and volume of magma is unknown due to no exposed dikes or sills at the surface.

== See also ==
- List of fossiliferous stratigraphic units in Virginia
- List of fossiliferous stratigraphic units in North Carolina
- Central Atlantic magmatic province
- Newark Supergroup
