= Hickory Grove Basalt =

Large basaltic lava flow in Virginia, USA

Hickory Grove Basalt Hickory Grove Basalt (Virginia)
- Stratigraphic range: ~201.5 Ma
- Type: Flood Basalt lava flow
- Unit of: Newark Supergroup
- Sub-units: Culpeper Basin
- Underlies: Turkey Run formation
- Overlies: Midland Formation
- Thickness: up to 700 ft (213 m)

Location
- Location: Virginia
- Coordinates: 77.6571°N 38.8294°W
- Region: Mid-Atlantic (United States)
- Country: United States

The Hickory Grove Basalt is a large basaltic lava flow in the Culpeper Basin located in the US state of Virginia. Part of the larger Central Atlantic magmatic province associated with the break up of the supercontinent Pangea, the Hickory Grove Basalt was the second large outpouring of basaltic lava in the Culpeper Basin. The Mount Zion Church Basalt was the earliest and the Sander Basalt was the last.

== Extent ==
The wider Central Atlantic magmatic province (CAMP) was one of the largest eruptions in Earth's history; exceeding 2.5 million cubic kilometers of lava. This is comparable to the Siberian Traps or Deccan Traps.

In places like the Culpeper Basin, lava exploited preexisting weakness left by the formation of Pangea. These suture zones provided an easy pathway for magma to travel up through. The result was a long and expansive fissure system that were surprisingly short in duration. Many studies state that a single sync-eruption lasted no more than a century.

== Geology ==
The Hickory Grove Basalt erupted in the Culpeper Basin, which is part of the larger Newark Supergroup encompassing CAMP eruptions in North America. The Culpeper rift valley is characterized as a half graben. Both freshwater and saline to hypersaline lakes were in the basin between eruptive events.

The Hickory Grove Basalt was the second in the sequence of eruptions in the Culpeper Basin during the Mesozoic. Compared to the Mount Zion Church Basalt, Hickory Grove Basalt is characterized by lower MgO and a higher iron content. Being more iron rich means lava is found heavily eroded with a reddish-gray color breaking down into Saprolite.

=== Age and relation to the end-Triassic extinction ===
Although the age of the Hickory Grove Basalt through 40Ar/39Ar has not been absolutely identified, its geochemistry closely matches that of the Preakness Basalt in the Newark Basin (which erupted at the same time). High-resolution mercury and carbon-isotope records from those basins group the Hickory Grove–Preakness flow sequence within the main pulse of Central Atlantic magmatism temporally coincident with the end-Triassic extinction event (ETE).

Global stratigraphic compilations place the ETE at approximately 201.4 Ma, marked by a large negative carbon-isotope release and rapid decline of both aquatic and land animals. These records are widely interpreted as reflecting volatiles released from CAMP magmatism, with the Hickory Grove Basalt eruption forming one of the key events of the extinction.

Later research using High-precision U–Pb zircon geochronology of CAMP diabase has been used to age lava units such as the Hickory Grove Basalt into this framework by geochemical correlation. This indicates that the Hickory Grove Basalt sequence erupted within a few hundred thousand years of 201.5 Ma.
