= Sander Basalt =

Triassic lava bed in the United States

- Stratigraphic range: 201.5 ± 1.3 Ma
- Type: Rift basin
- Unit of: Culpeper Basin
- Sub-units: Sandstone, Siltstone
- Underlies: Turkey Run Formation
- Overlies: Waterfall Formation
- Thickness: up to 545 metres (1,790 ft)

Lithology
- Primary: Tholeiitic Basalt

Location
- Location: Northwestern Virginia
- Coordinates: 38.7605°N 77.68°W
- Region: Eastern United States
- Country: United States
- Extent: 30 miles (48 km)

Sander Basalt

Sander Basalt is the third and final basalt flow in the Culpeper Basin. Located just east of the Appalachian Mountains in northern Virginia, it is part of the larger Central Atlantic Magmatic Province (CAMP) large igneous province, and its associated rift valleys, Newark Supergroup, which was one of the largest volcanic eruptions in Earth's history. It is associated with the initial break up of the ancient supercontinent of Pangea and just before the opening of the Atlantic Ocean.

== Geological history ==
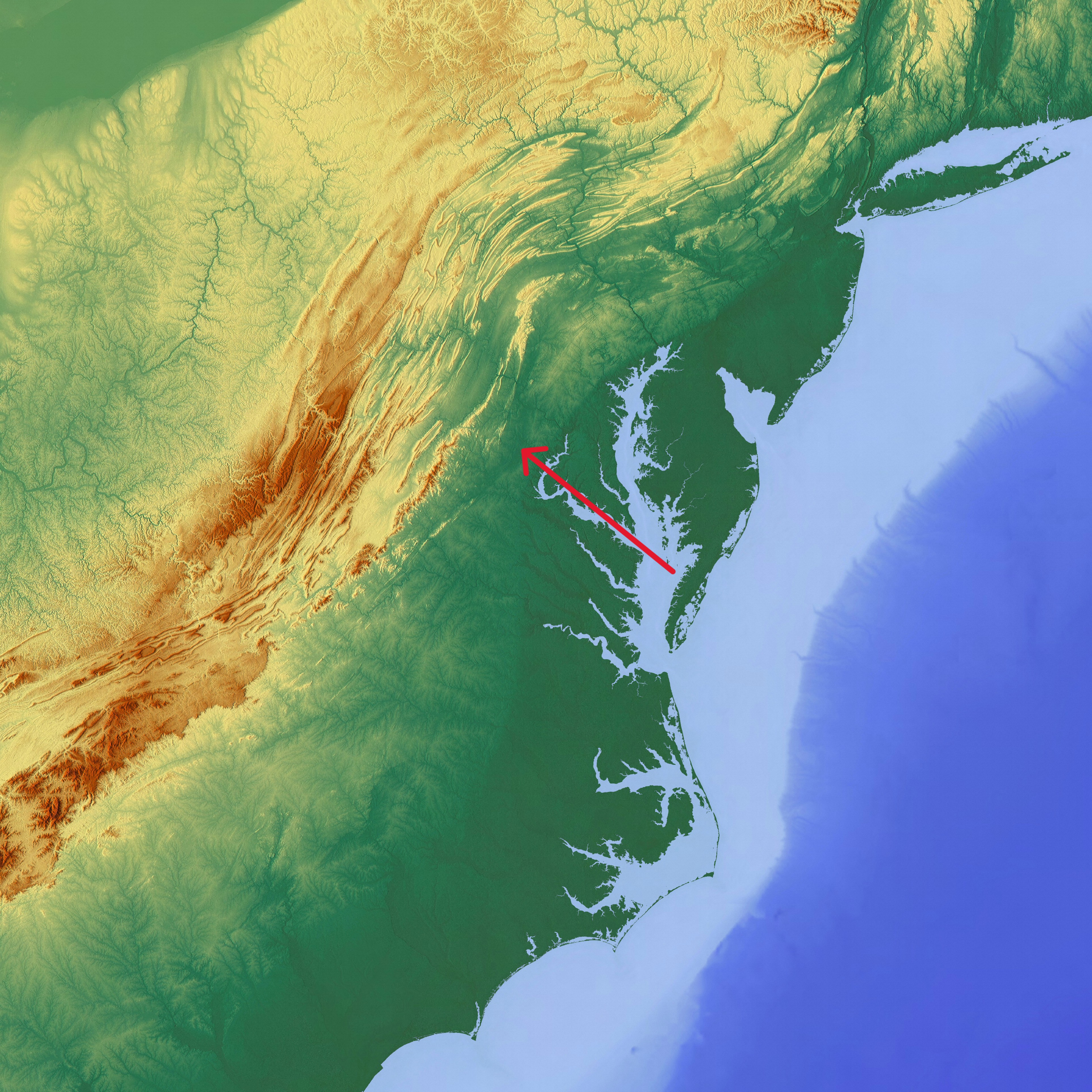
Location of the Culpeper Basin

The Central Atlantic Magmatic Province was the initial pulse of magmatism associated with the rifting a break up of Pangea. Pangea formed ~330 Ma with the closing of the Rheic Ocean During Pangea's formation, many different island arc (exotic terranes) collided with Laurentia and subsequently formed the Appalachian Mountains. The three mountain-building events that raised the Appalachians were the Taconic, Acadian, and Alleghanian oroganies.

These mountain building events not only raised the Appalachian Mountains to possibly as high as the present day Himalayan Mountains, but the continued accreation of island arc terranes created zones of weakness in the crust. These would be used by magma during the CAMP eruptions as an easy pathway for magma to reach the surface.

== Sander Basalt ==
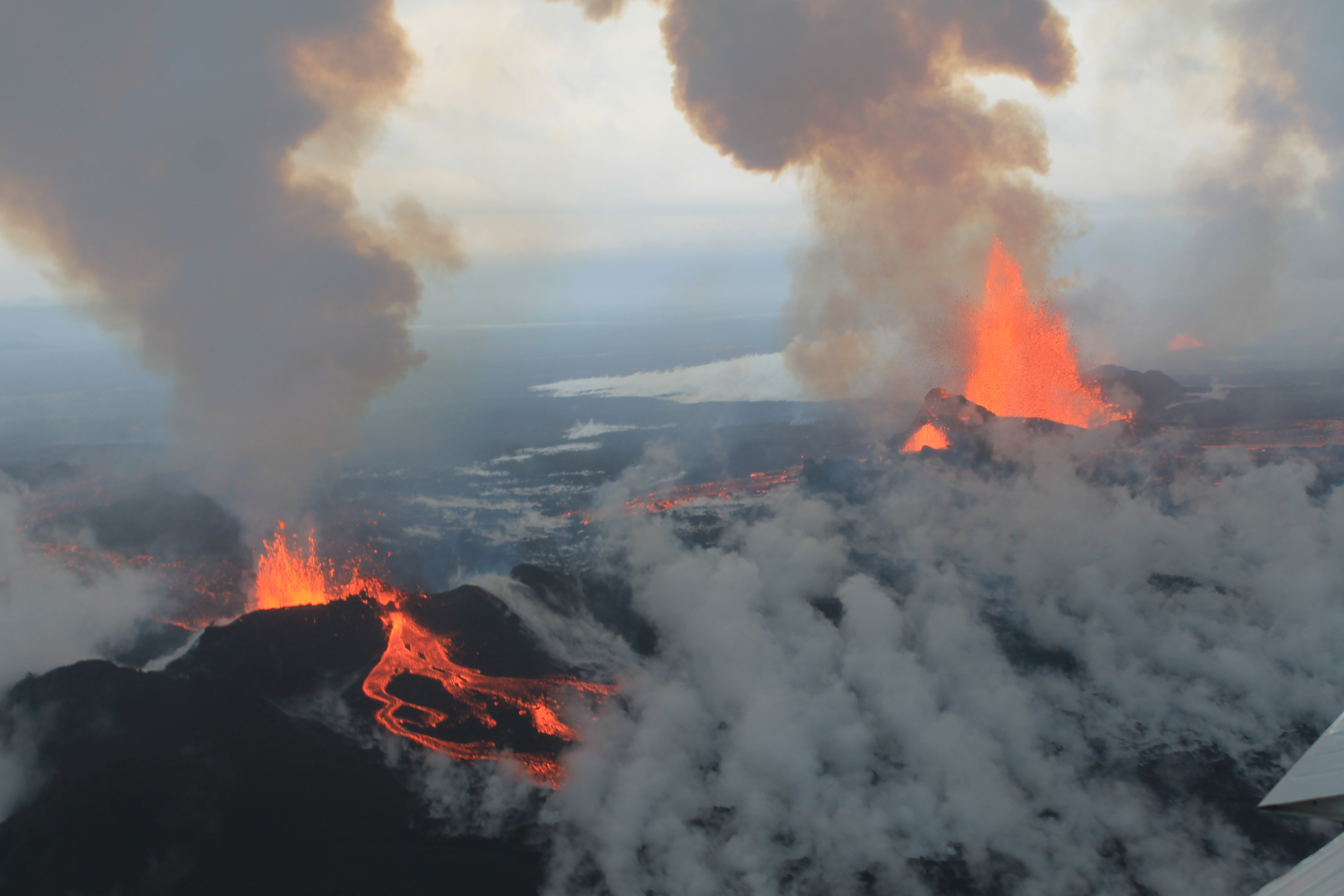
Sander Basalt was not a single volcanic vent. Instead it was an extremely long fissure eruption that was possibly hundreds of miles long. The Bárðarbunga Volcano pictured is the type of eruption Sander basalt would have been, but on a much larger scale

The Sander Basalt was the third eruptive event in the Culpeper Basin (with the Mount Zion Church Basalt and Hickory Grove Basalt preceding it.) The eruption was not one continuous eruption for its duration. There is evidence for at least nine different flows; by far the most of the three eruptive pulses (both the Mount Zion Church Basalt and the Hickory Grove Basalt had two flows each). Each individual lava flow is separated by a thin layer of sedimentary layer of sandstone and siltstone.

Sanders Basalt is slightly different than the other two Culpeper Basin basalt flows. It has a distinctive curved columnar joints. It is also has a slightly different chemistory than the other two basalt flows. It is high-titanium, high-iron, quartz-normative Tholeiitic basalts.
