= Bull Run Formation =

Geological formation in the United States

- Stratigraphic range: Norian; ~222–210 Ma
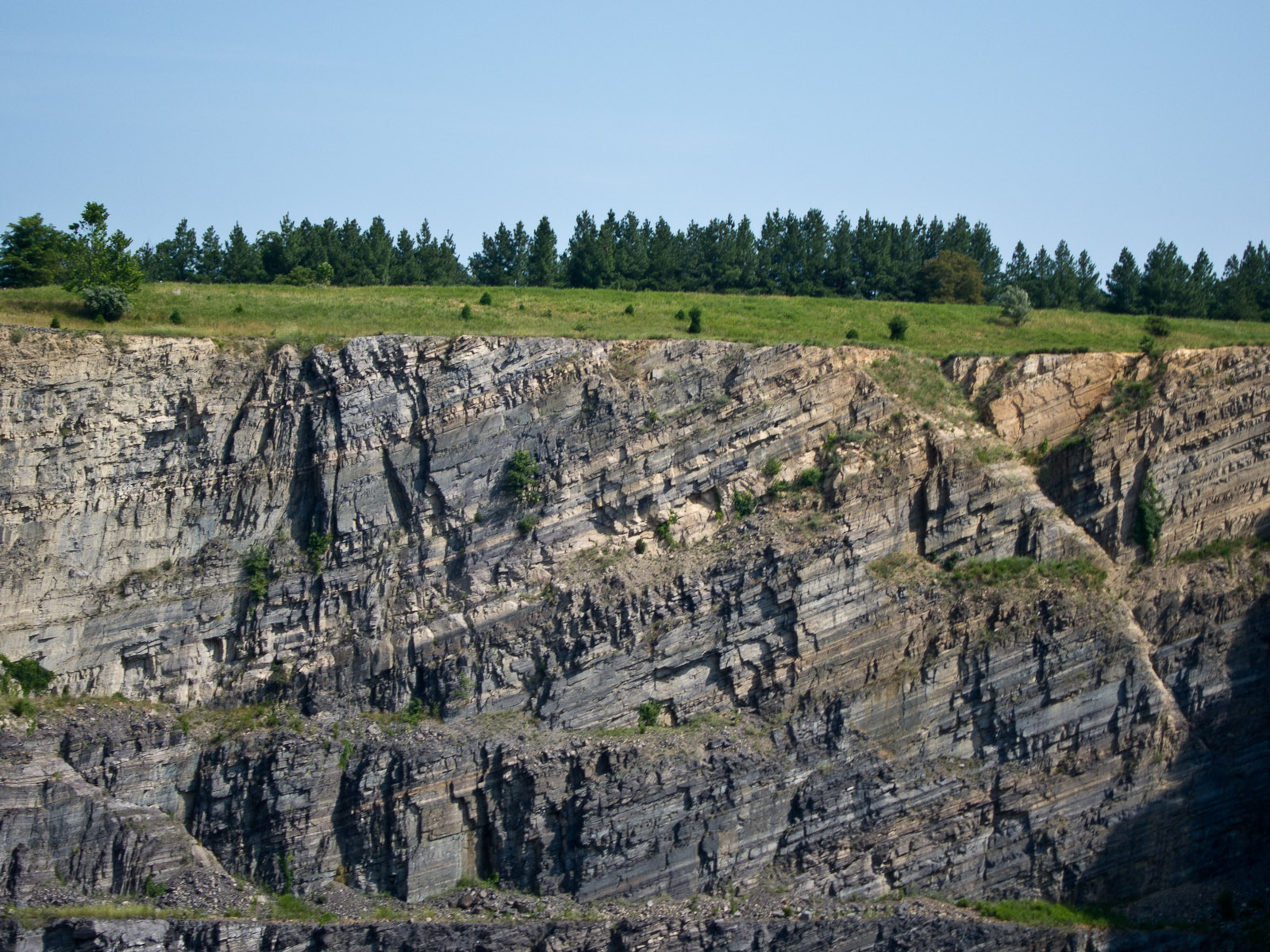
- Layers of Balls Bluff Siltstone at a quarry near Manassas, Virginia
- Type: Geological formation
- Unit of: Chatham Group
- Sub-units: Balls Bluff Member, Groveton Member, Leesburg Member, Mountain Run Member, Haudricks Mountain Member
- Underlies: Catharpin Creek Formation
- Overlies: Manassas Sandstone

Lithology
- Primary: Mudstone
- Other: Shale, sandstone, siltstone, conglomerate

Location
- Coordinates: 38.9°N 77.4°W
- Approximate paleocoordinates: 13.3°N 21.8°W
- Region: Maryland, Virginia
- Country: United States
- Extent: Culpeper Basin
- Bull Run Formation (the United States) Bull Run Formation (Virginia)

The Bull Run Formation is a Late Triassic (Norian) stratigraphic unit in the eastern United States. It is part of the Newark Supergroup, exposed in the Culpeper Basin of Virginia and Maryland. Fossil fish bones and scales have been found in outcrops of the formation's Groveton Member in Manassas National Battlefield Park.

The United States Geological Survey does not formally recognize the Bull Run Formation as a distinct formation, but its validity has been promoted by some paleontologists.

== Geology ==
The Bull Run Formation includes several subunits:

- Balls Bluff Member (or Balls Bluff Siltstone): Fluvial (stream and river) sandstones and shales. The oldest and most widespread subunit of the formation. It is more common near the rim of the Culpeper Basin, where the dry lake deposits of the Groveton Member are less prevalent.
- Groveton Member: Rhythmic playa lake shales and paleosols. Common in the central part of the Culpeper Basin, where it overlies the Balls Bluff Member.
- Leesburg Member (or Leesburg Conglomerate Member): A conglomerate of limestone and dolomite fragments, outcropping in the northern Culpeper Basin above strata of the Balls Bluff Member.
- Mountain Run Member (or Cedar Mountain Member): A conglomerate of greenstone fragments outcropping near Cedar Mountain in Culpeper County, Virginia.
- Haudricks Mountain Member: Sandstones and metamorphic rock fragments outcropping near Haudricks Mountain in the Barboursville Basin.

The latter two members were once identified as a separate formation, the Tibbstown Formation. However, later studies argued that they are merely local exposures where the Bull Run Formation takes on eroded rock material from surrounding mountains. The Bull Run Formation is sometimes regarded as part of the Passaic Formation.

== Paleobiota ==
Distinctly rounded stones (possible gastroliths) are common in the Balls Bluff Member, while direct fossil material is more rare. The following vertebrates have been reported from the formation:

- Coelacanth scales (Diplurus newarki)
- Phytosaur teeth and other isolated bones (Rutiodon cf. manhattanensis or Machaeroprosopus)
- Semionotus sp.

=== Footprints ===
Trackways are abundant in the Groveton Member. The largest and most diverse footprint site in the formation is Culpeper Crushed Stone Company quarry near Stevensburg, Virginia. Footprints are also common in and around Manassas National Battlefield Park.

- Agrestipus hottoni
- Anomoepus sp.
- Apatopus lineatus
- Brachychirotherium parvum
- Chirotherium lulli
- Eubrontes cursorius
- Grallator tenuis
- Grallator tuberosus
- Grallator sillimani
- Gwyneddichnium majore
- Kayentapus minor
- Rhychosauroides brunswickii

== See also ==
- List of dinosaur-bearing rock formations
  - List of stratigraphic units with ornithischian tracks
    - Indeterminate ornithischian tracks
