= Culpeper Basin =

Triassic rift basin in the United States

- Stratigraphic range: Late Triassic–Early Jurassic
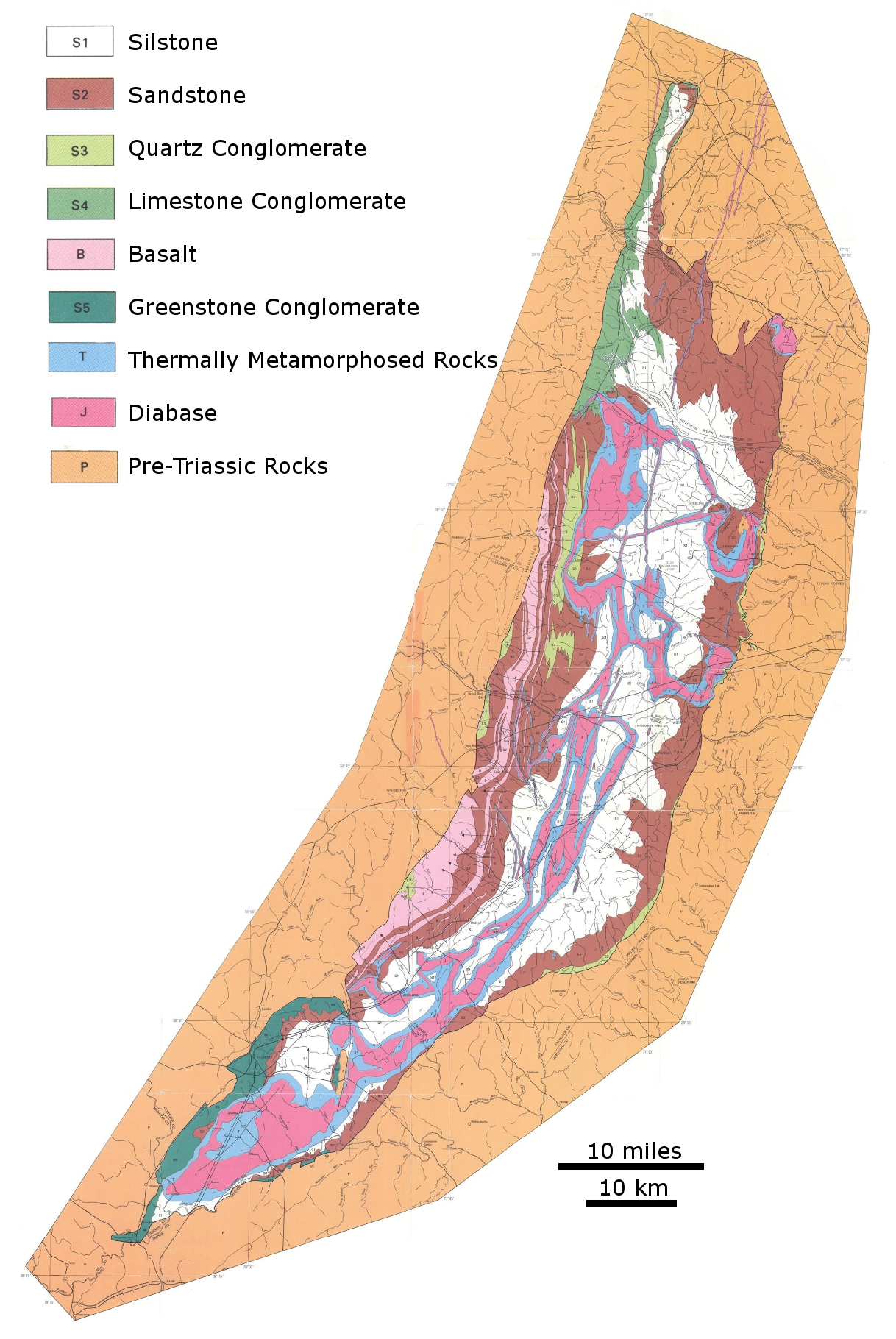
- Geologic map of Culpeper Basin from USGS, 1983 link to publication.
- Type: Half-graben rift valley
- Unit of: Newark Supergroup
- Sub-units: (Sedimentary units): Manassas Sandstone, Bull Run Formation, Catharpin Creek Formation, Midland Formation, Turkey Run Formation, Waterfall Formation (Igneous units): Mount Zion Church Basalt, Hickory Grove Basalt, Sander Basalt
- Area: 2,545 square miles, 4,096 square kilometers
- Thickness: up to 27,000 feet (8,230 m)

Lithology
- Primary: Sandstone, Mudstone, Siltstone, Conglomerate
- Other: Basalt, Diabase

Location
- Location: Western Piedmont of Virginia and Maryland
- Coordinates: 39.0953°N 77.7044°W
- Region: Virginia, Maryland
- Country: United States
- Extent: 83 miles (134 km)
- Culpeper Basin (Virginia)

The Culpeper Basin is one of the Newark Supergroup's Late Triassic–Early Jurassic rift basins, exposed in Northern Virginia and Maryland. Its development is tied to the initial rifting of the supercontinent Pangea (~201 Ma, across the Triassic-Jurassic boundary). Volcanism associated with the Culpeper Basin was part of a much larger event known as the Central Atlantic magmatic province (CAMP), one of the largest flood basalt eruptions in Earth's history.

== Geography ==
The Culpeper Basin lies just east of the Appalachian Mountains and extends from the Madison County—Orange County line in Virginia to Frederick, Maryland. A diverse group of sedimentary rocks including siltstone, sandstone, and conglomerate within the basin were intruded by igneous rocks (primarily diabase), which caused thermal metamorphism at the contact with sedimentary rock.

The Culpeper Basin is nearly continuous with the Gettysburg Basin to the north and with the Barboursville Basin to the south. The Groveton Member of the Bull Run Formation is exposed there. The formation has produced disarticulated fish remains including isolated bones and scales.

== Geology ==
The Culpeper Basin preserves a series of both sedimentary formations and large basaltic lava flows associated with the initial rifting of Pangea. From oldest to youngest, these subunits are:

- Manassas Sandstone: Alluvial and stream sandstone and conglomerate, including the Poolesville, Tuscarora Creek, Reston, and Rapidan members. Footprints and fish are occasional found in these layers.
- Bull Run Formation: Alluvial, stream, and playa lake sediments, including the Groveton, Balls Bluff, Haudricks Mountain, Mountain Run, and Leesburg members. Footprints are common in the Groveton Member, while body fossils sometimes occur in the Balls Bluff Member.
- Catharpin Creek Formation: Alluvial sandstone and conglomerate, including the Goose Creek Member.
- Mount Zion Church Basalt: This was the first eruption during CAMP volcanism, near the end of the Triassic.
- Midland Formation: Stream and lake sandstone and siltstone, equivalent in age to the Triassic-Jurassic boundary. Footprints and fish are occasional found in these layers.
- Hickory Grove Basalt: This was the second outpouring of basaltic lava during the CAMP eruptions, near the start of the Jurassic.
- Turkey Run Formation: River, lake, and delta sediments
- Sander Basalt: This was the final pulse of CAMP-related volcanic activity in the Culpeper Basin.
- Waterfall Formation: Lake sediments, including the Millbrook Quarry Member.

A large body of diabase in central Montgomery County, Maryland, is known as the Boyds Sill, named after the town of Boyds. Today, the Culpeper Basin is covered by up 12,800 feet of sediment, mainly composed of fluvial siltstones and sandstones.

== Fossils ==
In the upland Bull Run Formation, gastroliths (swallowed stomach stones) have been reported. They have been found in four different locations within the Bull Run Formation. These stones are interpreted as being eaten by herbivorous sauropodomorph dinosaurs to help them digest their food.

Footprints are among the most common fossils in the Culpeper Basin. Footprints of theropod dinosaurs: Grallator and Kayentapus, Eubrontes, the small ornithischian Anomoepus, pseudosuchian/Aetosaur type reptiles like Brachychirotherium and Chirotherium, and crocodilian Batrachopus tracks have all been found. Many marine fossils can also be found in the Culpeper Basin. Ostracodes, clam shrimp, Cyzicus sp. and Cornia sp.), fish, and plant fragments all show that saline lakes once existed in the basin. These lakes gave rise to their own ecosystems.

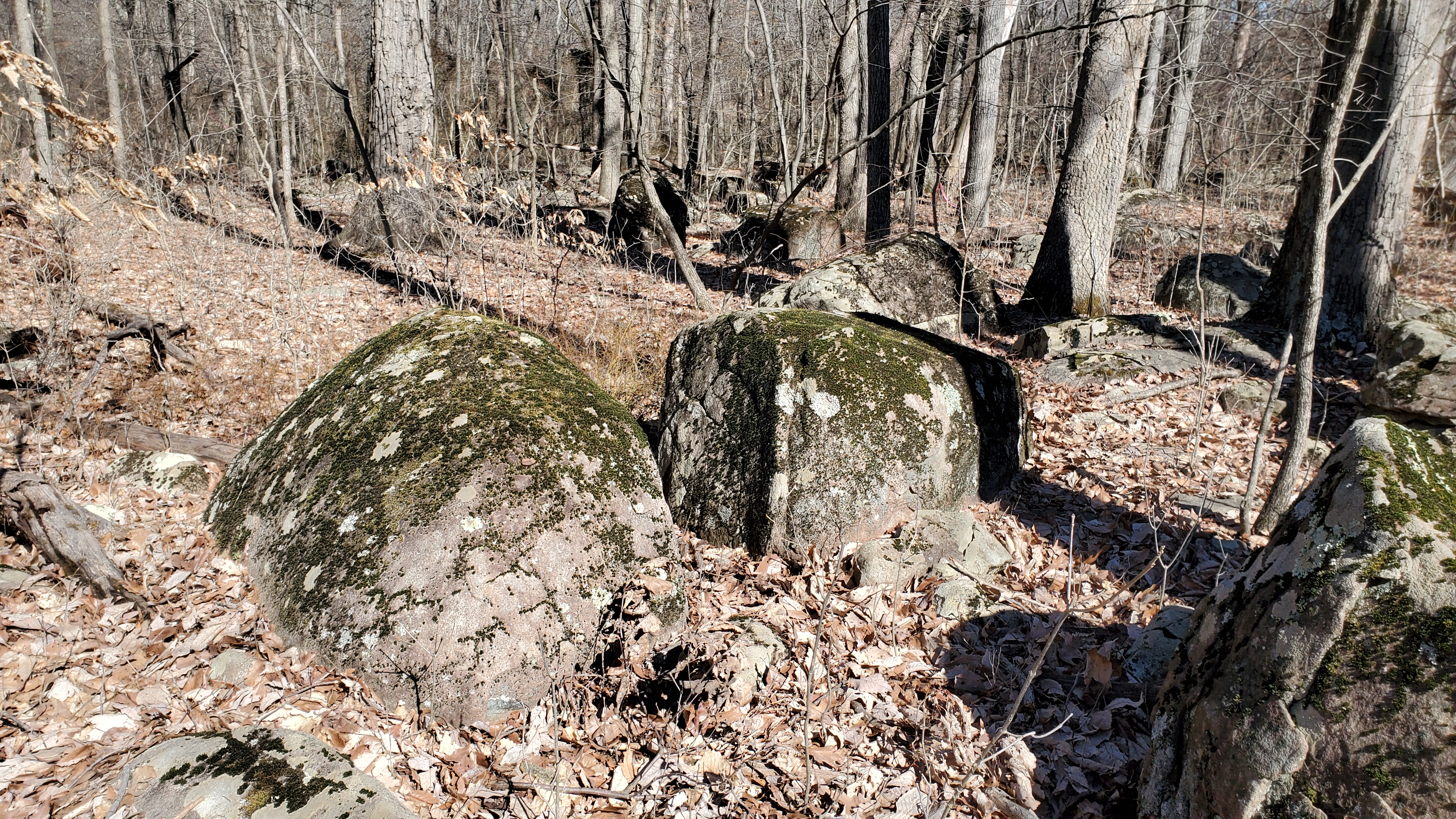
Jurassic diabase boulders in the Culpeper Basin northeast of Dulles Airport

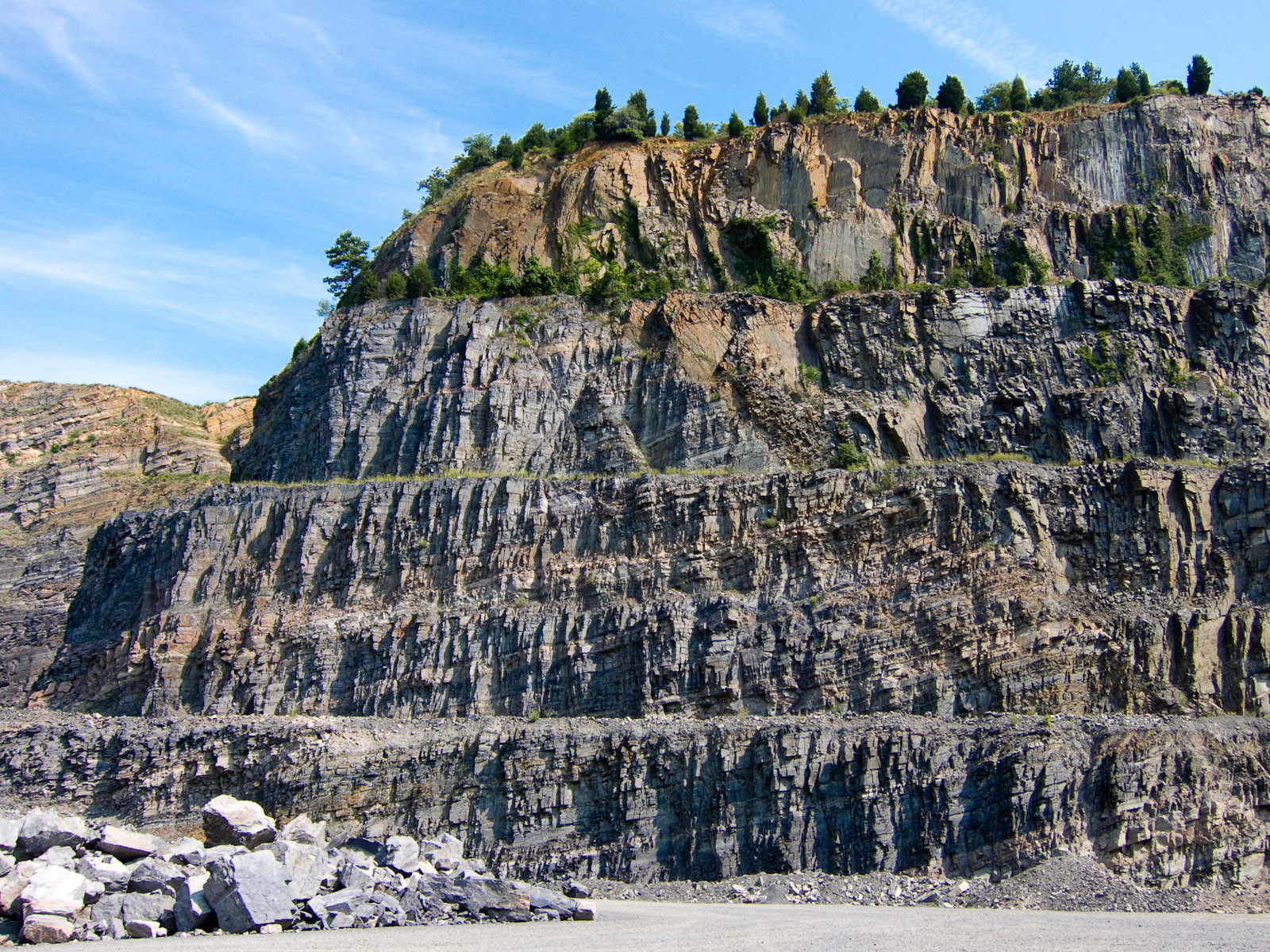
Balls Bluff Siltstone with diabase intrusion, northern face of Luck Stone Quarry, Manassas

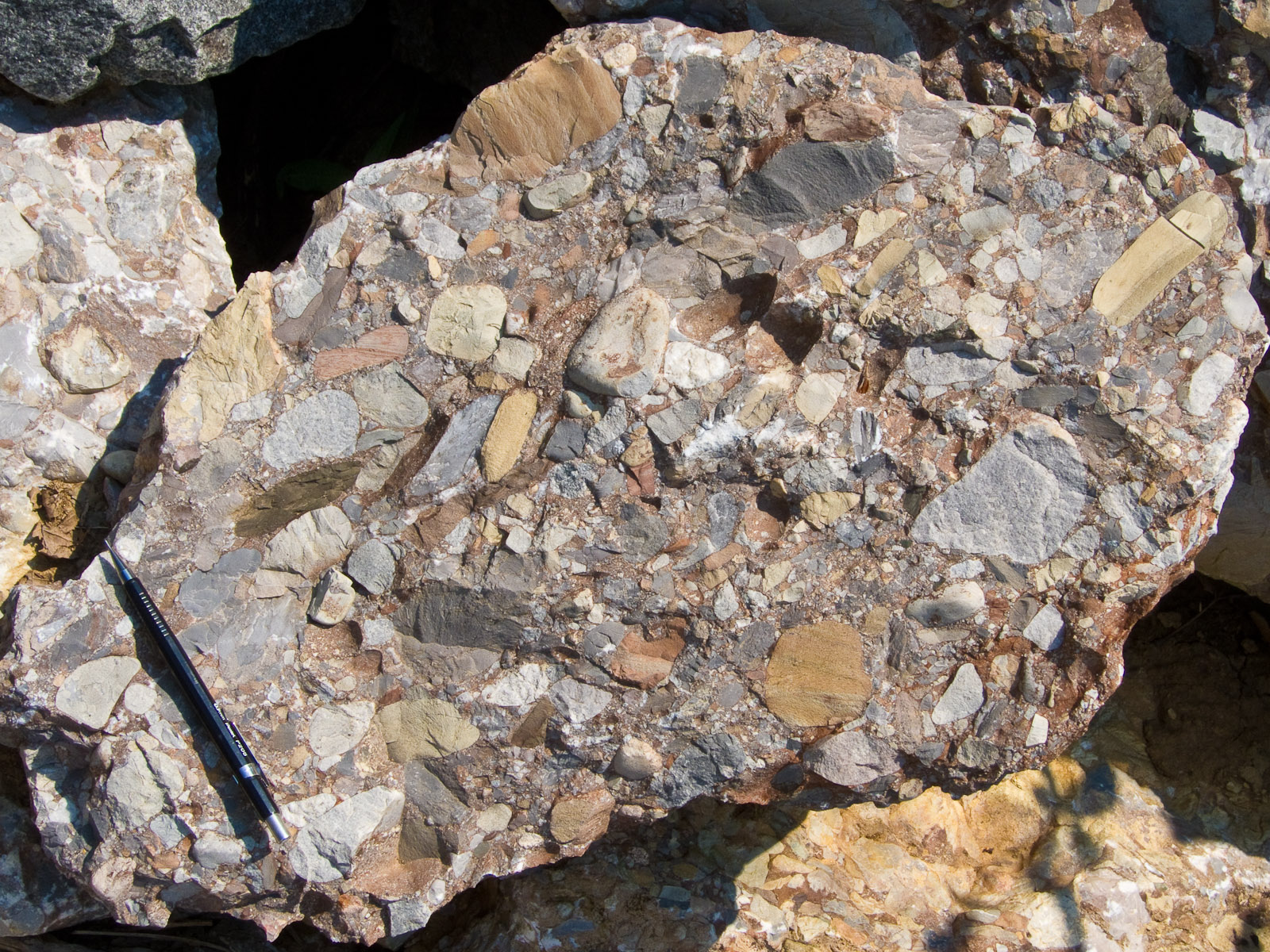
Limestone conglomerate of Leesburg Member

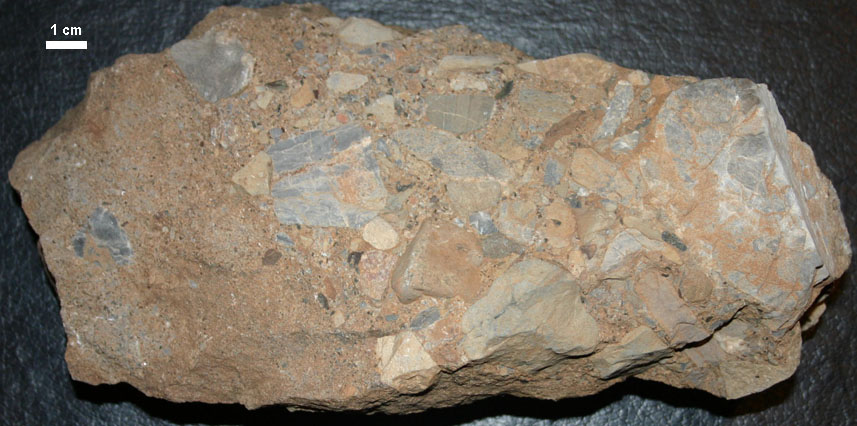
Another sample of limestone conglomerate

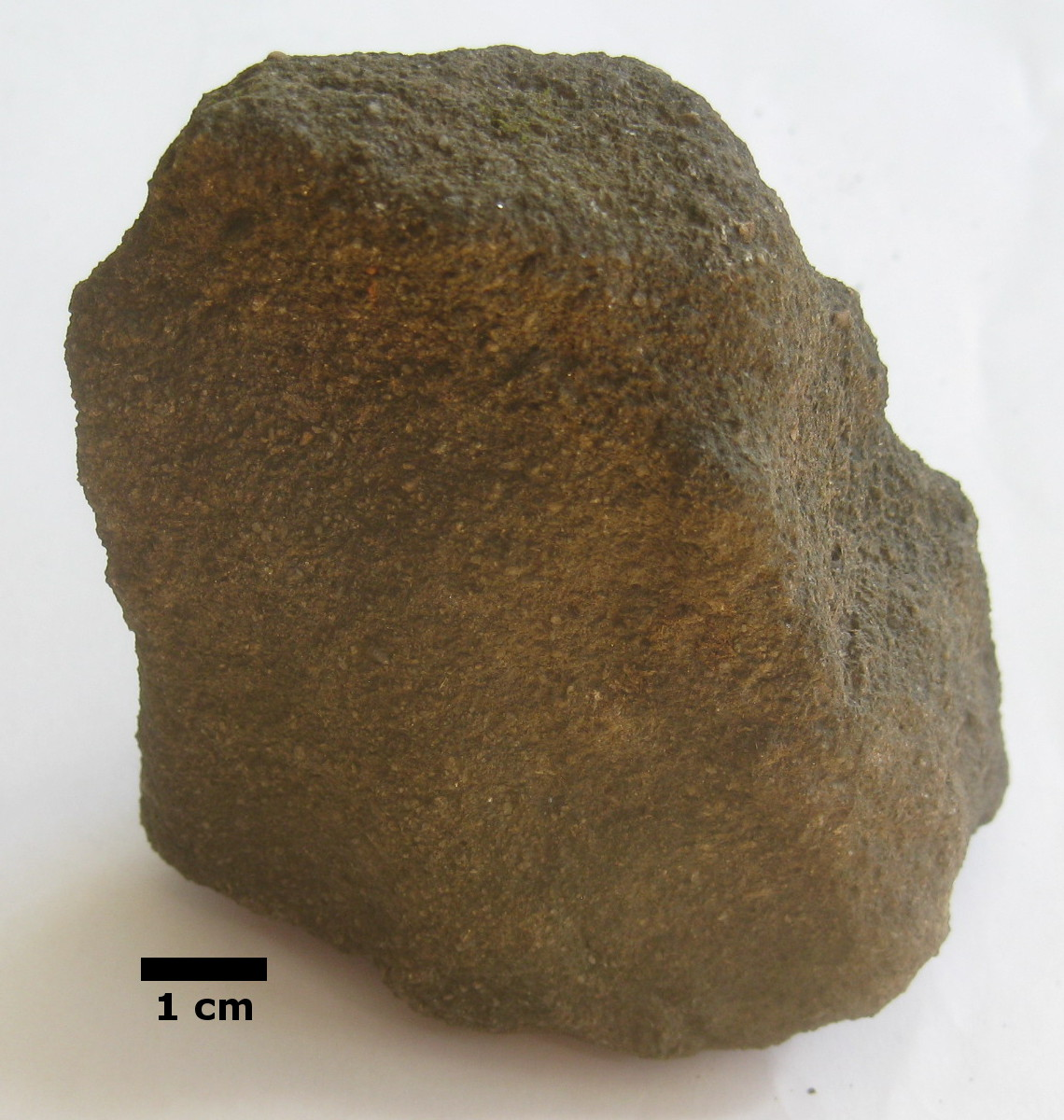
Sandstone from southwest the Boyds Sill in Montgomery County, Maryland

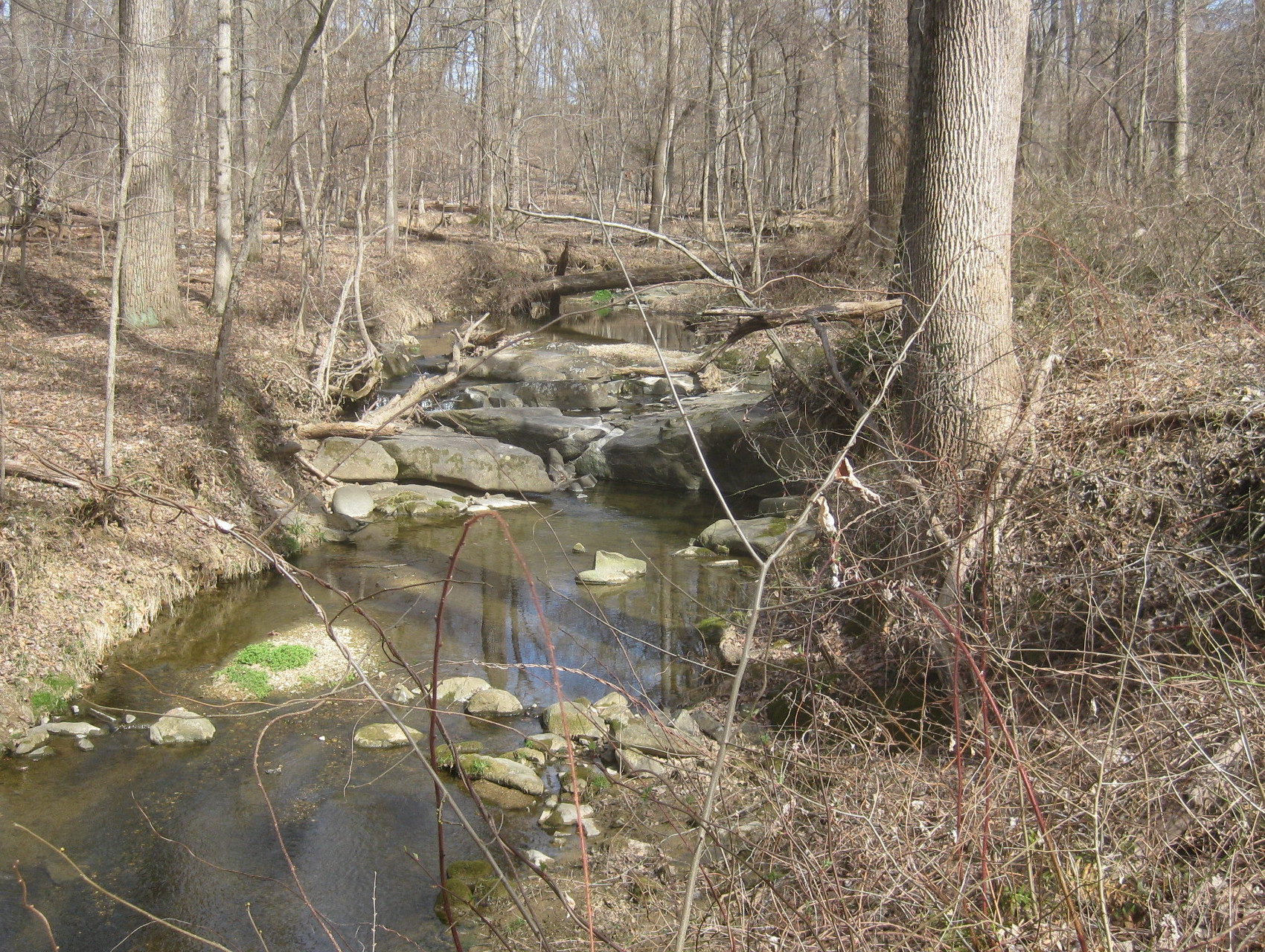
Unnamed stream exposing diabase of Boyds Sill, Hoyles Mill Trail, Montgomery County, Maryland

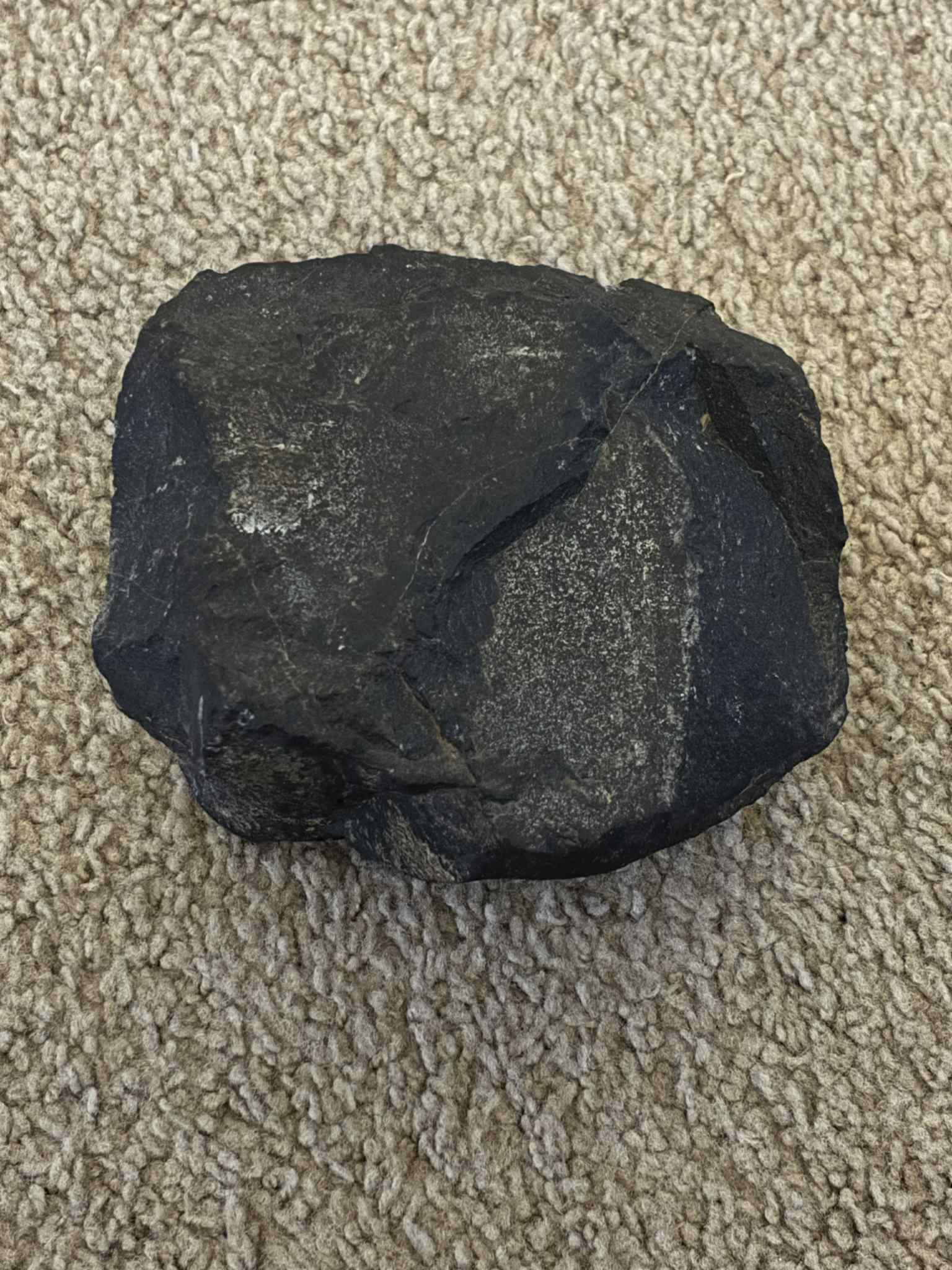
Basalt from the Mount Zion Church Basalt in Virginia
