= Midland Formation =

Mesozoic formation in Virginia, United States

- Stratigraphic range: Late Triassic to Early Jurassic (late Rhaetian to early Hettangian)
- Type: Geological formation
- Unit of: Meriden Group
- Underlies: Hickory Grove Basalt
- Overlies: Mount Zion Church Basalt

Lithology
- Primary: sandstone, siltstone
- Other: shale, limestone

Location
- Region: Maryland, Virginia
- Country: United States
- Extent: Culpeper Basin

Type section
- Named for: Midland, Virginia
- Named by: Lee & Froelich, 1989

The Midland Formation is a Mesozoic (latest Triassic to earliest Jurassic) geological formation in the Culpeper Basin of Virginia. It is a sedimentary unit which formed in a short period of time between the first two basalt flows in the basin: the Hickory Grove and Mount Zion Church basalts. The most common rocks in the formation are dark reddish interbedded sandstones and siltstones, representative of fluvial (stream) environments. Rare but fossiliferous calcareous shale and limestone also occurs, representing recurring lacustrine (lake) conditions. The Midland Formation is considered equivalent to the Shuttle Meadow Formation of the Hartford Basin, the Feltville Formation of the Newark Basin, and the Bendersville Formation of the Gettysburg Basin. Some sources prefer to classify the Midland Formation as part of the Shuttle Meadow Formation.

Based on conchostracan biostratigraphy, the Midland Formation is believed to contain the Triassic-Jurassic boundary near its base. A prominent shale layer containing Hettangian-age fossilized fish, the Midland fish bed, is present about 10 meters above the base of the formation. Though now flooded by a manmade lake, it was formerly well-exposed along Licking Run, just north of Midland, Virginia. Plant spores, coprolites, and dinosaur footprints have also been recorded at nearby outcrops.

== Paleobiota ==
Color key: Taxon / Reclassified taxon / Taxon falsely reported as present / Dubious taxon or junior synonym / Ichnotaxon / Ootaxon / Morphotaxon

Notes
Uncertain or tentative taxa are in small text
~~crossed out~~ taxa are discredited.

Paleobiota of the Midland Formation
Genus / Taxon	Species	Notes	Images
Anomoepus	A. scambus	Possible ornithischian dinosaur footprints.	
Batrachopus	B. deweyii	Crocodylomorph footprints.	
Darwinula	D. sp.	Freshwater ostracods (seed shrimp).	
Diplurus	D. longicaudatus	A coelacanth fish.	
Eubrontes	E. giganteus	Large theropod dinosaur footprints, up to 34 centimetres (13 in) in length.	
Grallator	G. parallelus	Theropod dinosaur footprints.	
Grallator	G. tuberosus	Theropod dinosaur footprints, often given the name Anchisauripus.	
Ptycholepis	P. marshi	A ptycholepiform fish.	
Redfieldius	R. gracilis	A redfieldiiform fish, the most common fish in the formation.	
Semionotus	'S. micropterus' group	A semionotiform fish.	

== See also ==
- List of dinosaur-bearing rock formations
  - List of stratigraphic units with theropod tracks
