= Essaouira-Agadir basin =

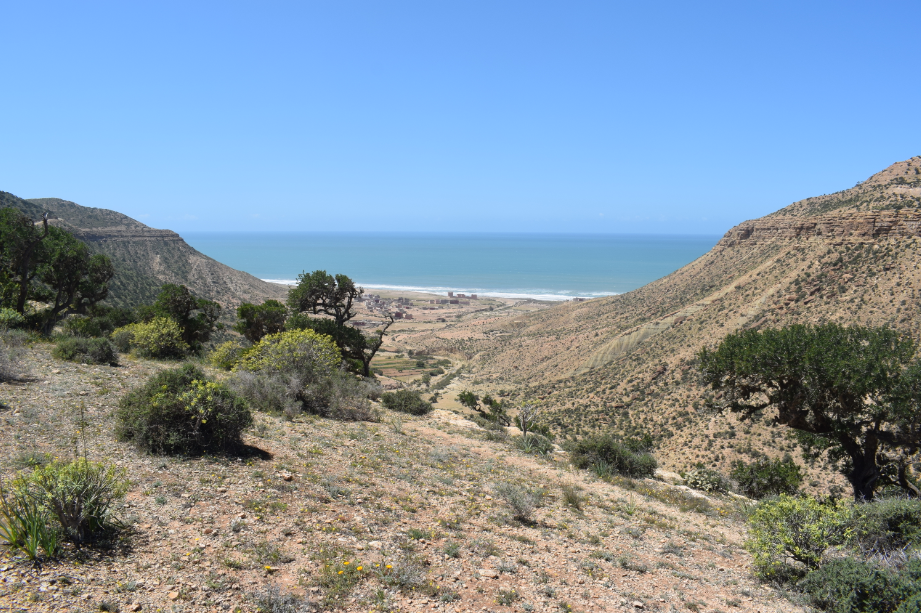
- Teldi photographed from the top of the Assaka valley: the right cliff (north side) shows the Lower Cretaceous stratigraphy of the Essaouira-Agadir asin (dominated by marls and clays with rare sandstone and limestone beds)
- Country: Morocco

The Essaouira Agadir basin is a Meso-Cenozoic sedimentary basin located along the Atlantic margin of Morocco at its connection with the Western High Atlas.
