= Cornia =

Cornia is a surname. Notable people with the surname include:

- Gary C. Cornia, American academic
- Giovanni Andrea Cornia (1947–2024), Italian economist
