= Manassas Sandstone =

Sandstone geological formation in Virginia, United States

- Stratigraphic range: Late Triassic
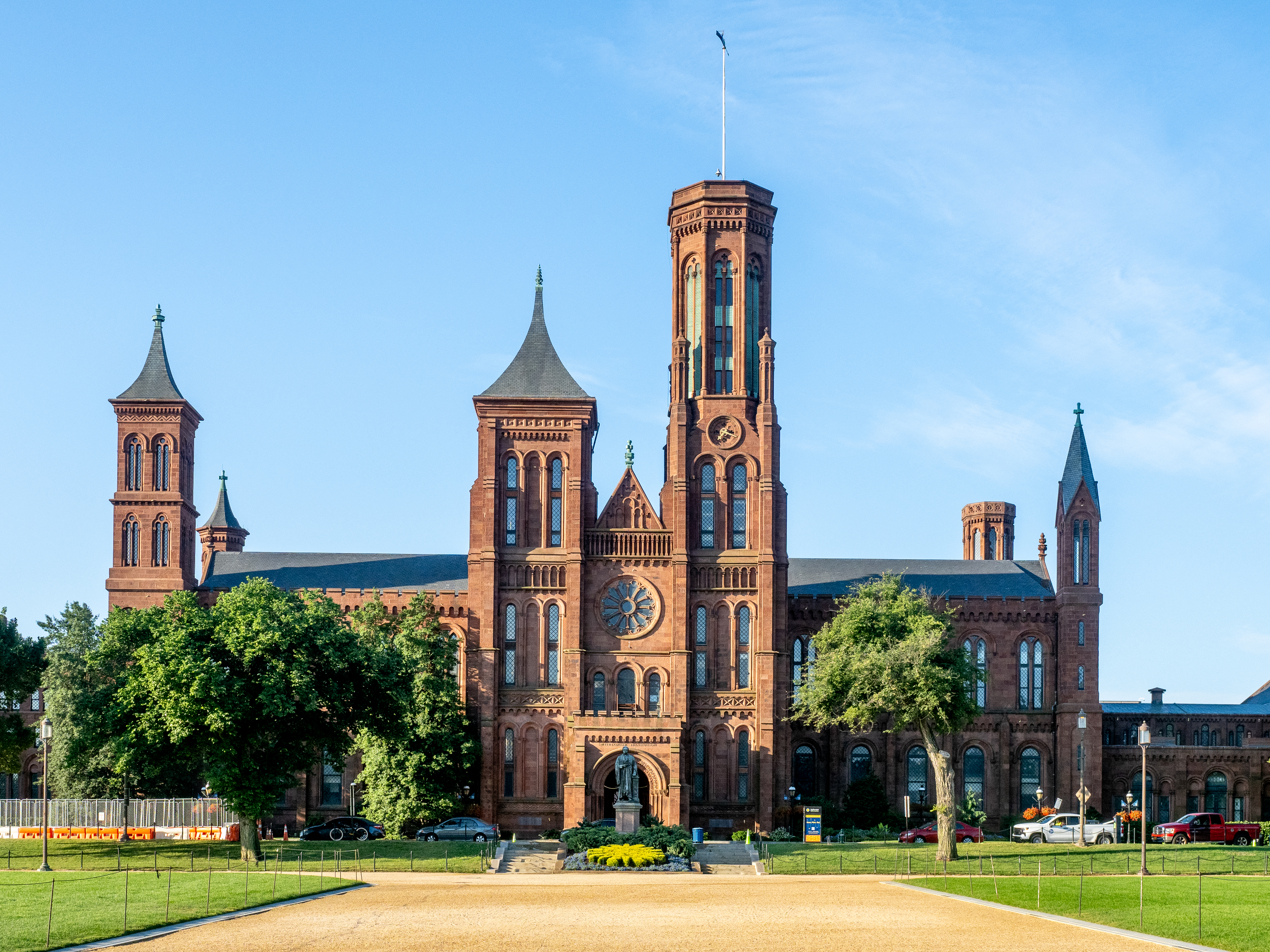
- Smithsonian Castle in Washington, D.C., built using red Triassic sandstone from Seneca Quarry
- Type: Geological formation
- Unit of: Chatham Group
- Sub-units: Reston Member, Rapidan Member, Tuscarora Creek Member, Poolesville Member
- Underlies: Bull Run Formation

Lithology
- Primary: Sandstone, shale

Location
- Coordinates: 38.9°N 77.7°W
- Approximate paleocoordinates: 13.2°N 22.0°W
- Region: Virginia, Maryland
- Country: United States

Type section
- Named for: Manassas, Virginia
- Manassas Sandstone (the United States) Manassas Sandstone (Virginia)

The Manassas Sandstone is a Late Triassic geological unit in Virginia and Maryland, United States. Mostly consisting of coarse sediments such as sandstone and conglomerate, it contains the oldest exposed Triassic rocks in the Culpeper Basin. The Manassas Sandstone is sometimes regarded as its own formation, and other times regarded as a member of the Passaic Formation.

== Geology ==
The Manassas Sandstone sits above an unconformity which divides the Chatham Group from older rocks which were undergoing erosion during the Late Triassic. Several subunits have been named for the Manassas Sandstone:

- Reston Member: Coarse red and gray sand, clay, silt, and angular cobble conglomerate. These sediments correspond to steep streams and debris flows on alluvial fans flowing down from the east-southeast. The Reston Member outcrops in the Potomac and Rappahannock watersheds, in the east-central Culpeper Basin.
- Rapidan Member: Gray and green conglomerate corresponding to an alluvial fan of metamorphic rocks, probably sourced from rocks of the Neoproterozoic Catoctin Formation and the Lower Cambrian Chilhowee Group. The Rapidan Member outcrops in the vicinity of the Rapidan River in the southeast Culpeper Basin and the nearby Barboursville Basin.
- Tuscarora Creek Member: Gray and pink conglomerate corresponding to an alluvial fan of limestone and dolomite, probably sourced from rocks of the Upper Cambrian Frederick Limestone and Lower Ordovician Grove Limestone. The Tuscarora Creek Member outcrops along Tuscarora Creek in Frederick County, Maryland.
- Poolesville Member: Red and gray arkosic sand, silt, clay, and paleosols, corresponding to braided streams flowing from southeast to northwest. The Poolesville Member is the thickest and most widespread portion of the Manassas Sandstone, found along the banks of the Potomac River and many of its tributaries. Dark red sandstones of the Poolesville Member were mined from the famed Seneca sandstone of Seneca Quarry. These rocks were used as building stones for local landmarks such as Seneca Aqueduct and Smithsonian Castle.

== Paleobiota ==
Reptile footprints have been found in the Manassas Sandstone, including those belonging to pseudosuchians (Brahychirotherium parvum, Chirotherium lulli), and possible theropod dinosaurs (Plesiornis pilulatus, Grallator tuberosus). Fish fossils are known from a site close to Manassas, Virginia, including species of Cionichthys, Tanaocrossus, and Semionotus.

== See also ==
- List of dinosaur-bearing rock formations
  - List of stratigraphic units with theropod tracks
