= Mount Zion Church Basalt =

Triassic lava flow in the United States

- Stratigraphic range: 201.8 ± 0.7 Ma
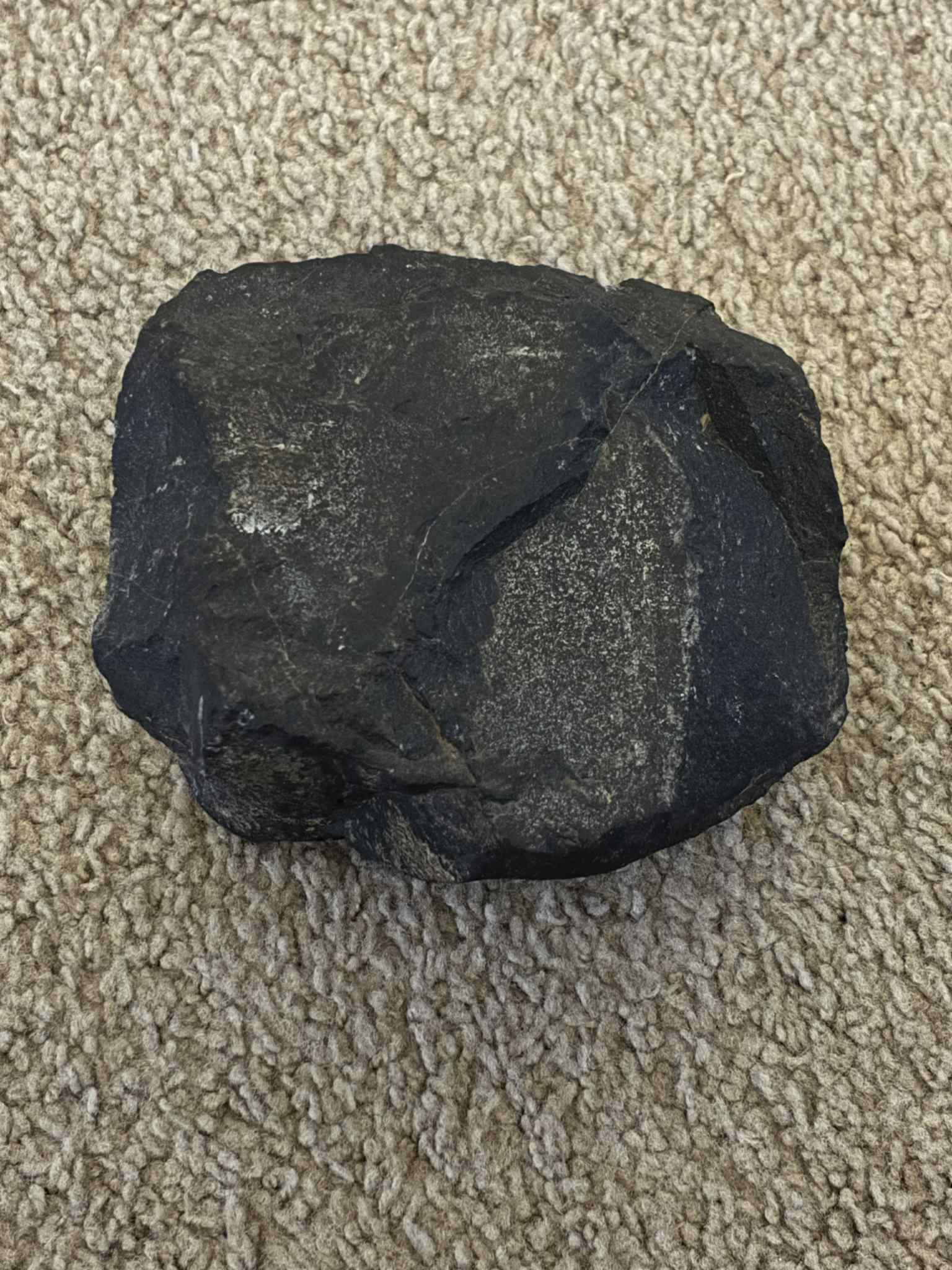
- A basalt rock from the Mount Zion Church Basalt
- Type: Half Graben
- Unit of: Newark Supergroup
- Overlies: Midland Formation
- Thickness: up to 100 metres (330 ft)

Lithology
- Primary: Basalt

Location
- Location: Virginia
- Coordinates: 38.9006°N 77.6229°W
- Region: Culpeper Basin
- Country: United States
- Extent: 30 miles (48 km)
- General location of the Mount Zion Church Basalt

The Mount Zion Church Basalt is a large volume flood basalt lava field located in the Culpeper Basin in the US state of Virginia. It was associated with the rifting and initial break-up of the ancient supercontinent Pangea. Part of the larger Newark Supergroup formation which is a part of the Central Atlantic magmatic province (CAMP) large igneous province which was one of the largest volcanic eruptions in Earth's history.

== Pangea ==
The ancient supercontient of Pangea existed between 300 and 200 Ma. This includes the continents known today as North America, South America, (Laurentia), Europe, and Africa (Gondwana) which all collided together to form the supercontient.

Around 230 Ma, Pangea showed its first signs of break up. Subduction zones lined Pangea on both side which began to cause extension in Pangea's interior. Along with orogenic collapse and thermal mantle heating caused by the enormous size of Pangea, were the main factors that led to continental breakup.

Between 250 and 200 Ma, Pangea underwent a counter-clockwise rotation focused on Laurentia, and a clockwise rotation focused on Gondwana, due to subduction zones. This further weakened Pangea's pre existing weaknesses from its formation. This caused rift valleys to form which gradually grew deeper and wider over time.

== Geology ==
The Mount Zion Church Basalt is the oldest of 3 eruptive cycles in the Culpeper Basin with the other 2 being the Hickory Grove Basalt and the Sander Basalt. Throughout the Newark Supergroup, the Mount Zion Church Basalt is equivalent to the Aspers Basalt in Pennsylvania and the Orange Mountain Basalt in New Jersey. The greater Culpeper Basin is made up to Sediment to igneous basalt layers that alternate between eruptive cycles.

The basalt found in the Mount Zion Church Basalt are generally aphanitic fine-grained and micro-porphyritic, high-titanium, normative tholeiitic basalt The main mineral phases are idiomorphic or sub-idiomorphic plagioclase and augitic clinopyroxene. During post eruption, the basalts contain calcite, prehnite, and zeolites.

There are at least 2 different lava flows that have been identified. The exposed basalt is quite narrow due to lava that settled inside a western border fault. Eruptions were characterized by long eruptive fissures that erupted large volumes of lava.

== See also ==
- Flood basalt
- Deccan Traps
- Siberian Traps
- Central Atlantic magmatic province
