= Cheliceratichnus =

Scientific classification
- Kingdom: Animalia
- Phylum: Arthropoda
- Subphylum: Chelicerata
- Class: Arachnida
- Order: incertae sedis
- Genus: Cheliceratichnus Dalman and Lucas, 2015

Trace fossil

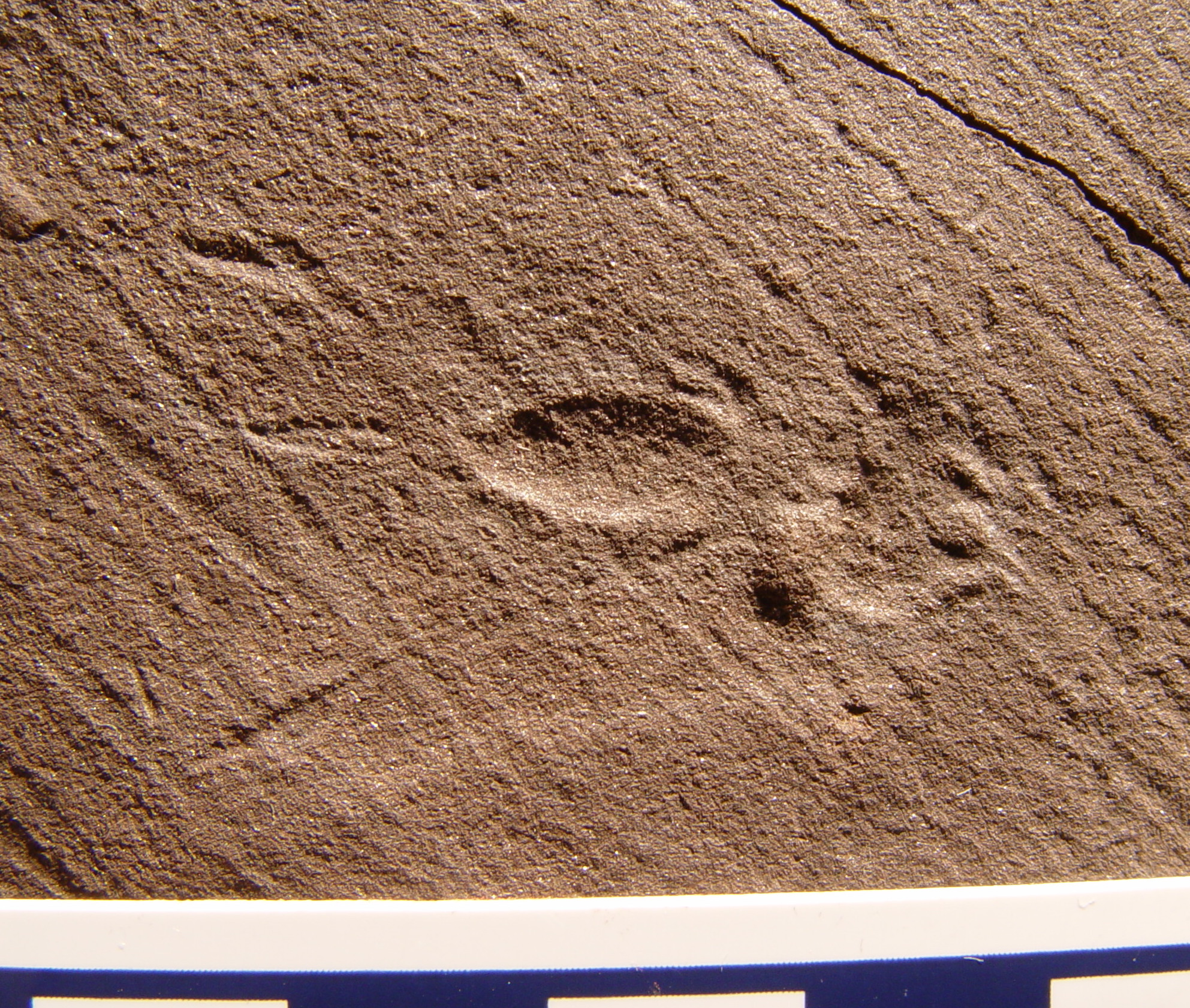
The holotype of Cheliceratichnus lockleyi from the Lower Jurassic East Berlin Formation of Holyoke, Massachusetts. Scale is in cm.

Cheliceratichnus, meaning trace of a chelicerate arthropod, is an ichnogenus erected for a body imprint discovered in the Lower Jurassic East Berlin Formation of Holyoke, Massachusetts. The specimen is now housed at the Springfield Science Museum in Springfield, Massachusetts. Considering that only a single specimen was found, the ichnogenus is monospecific, with the species name lockleyi honoring paleontologist and ichnologist Martin Lockley. In trace fossil classification schemes based on behavior, the body imprint is considered a cubichnion, or resting trace. Cheliceratichnus lockleyi exhibits the tagma characteristic of arthropods, with the trace divided into anterior, central, and posterior regions. Dalman and Lucas (2015) interpreted these regions as imprints of the chelicerae, prosoma, and opisthosoma, respectively, of a chelicerate arthropod. Additionally, imprints of the animal's legs and telson were identified. These authors noted that, in general, the pattern of the trace was similar to the body plan of the Solifugae, or camel spiders, but also noted that the presence of a telson imprint rules out that group because these animals lack telsons. Consequently, they attributed the trace to a solifuge-like arthropod without being more committal on what made it. In addition to the body imprint, the animal produced a trackway, called Acanthichnus cursorius, leading away from the body imprint, which demonstrates that the animal was alive at the time its body imprinted the sediment.

The location from which the specimen was derived, the Gaulin Dinosaur Tracksite, has been interpreted as a playa, or dry lake environment based on the presence of oscillation ripple marks, abundant mudcracks, and other sedimentary structures. Dinosaur tracks called Anomoepus lacertoideus were found near Cheliceratichnus lockleyi, on the same bedding plane, and their describers, Dalman and Weems (2013), interpreted them as those of small ornithischians. Other trace fossils found at the site include invertebrate trace fossils such as the arthropod trackway Bifurculapes, and the burrows Planolites and Treptichnus.
