= Climate of New England =

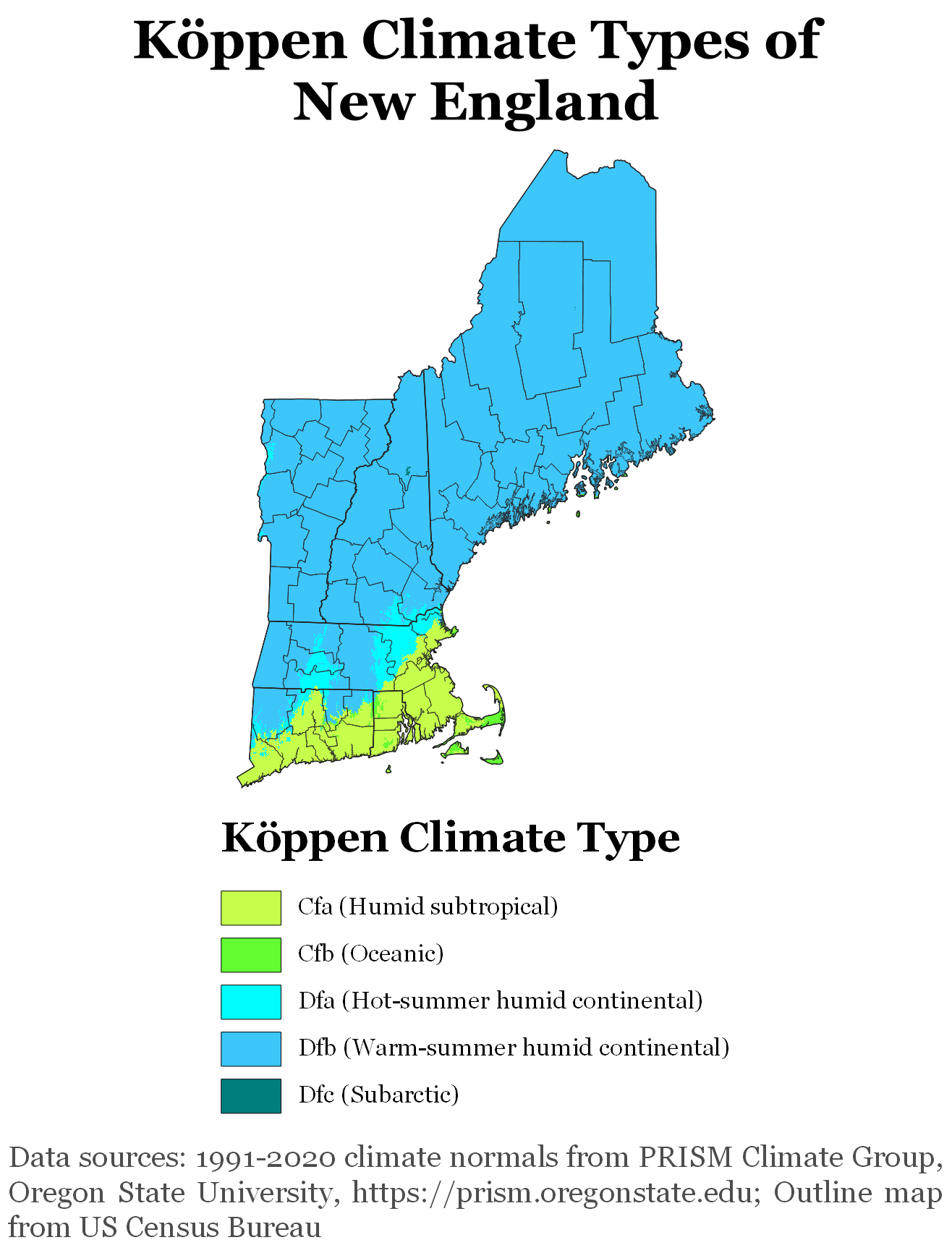
Köppen climate types of New England, using 1991-2020 climate normals.

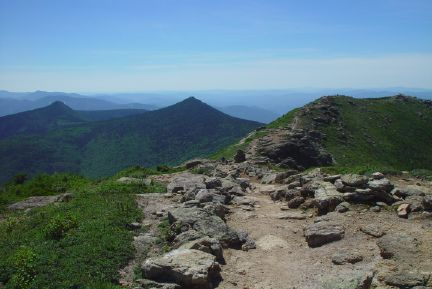
The White Mountains of New Hampshire are part of the Appalachian Mountains.

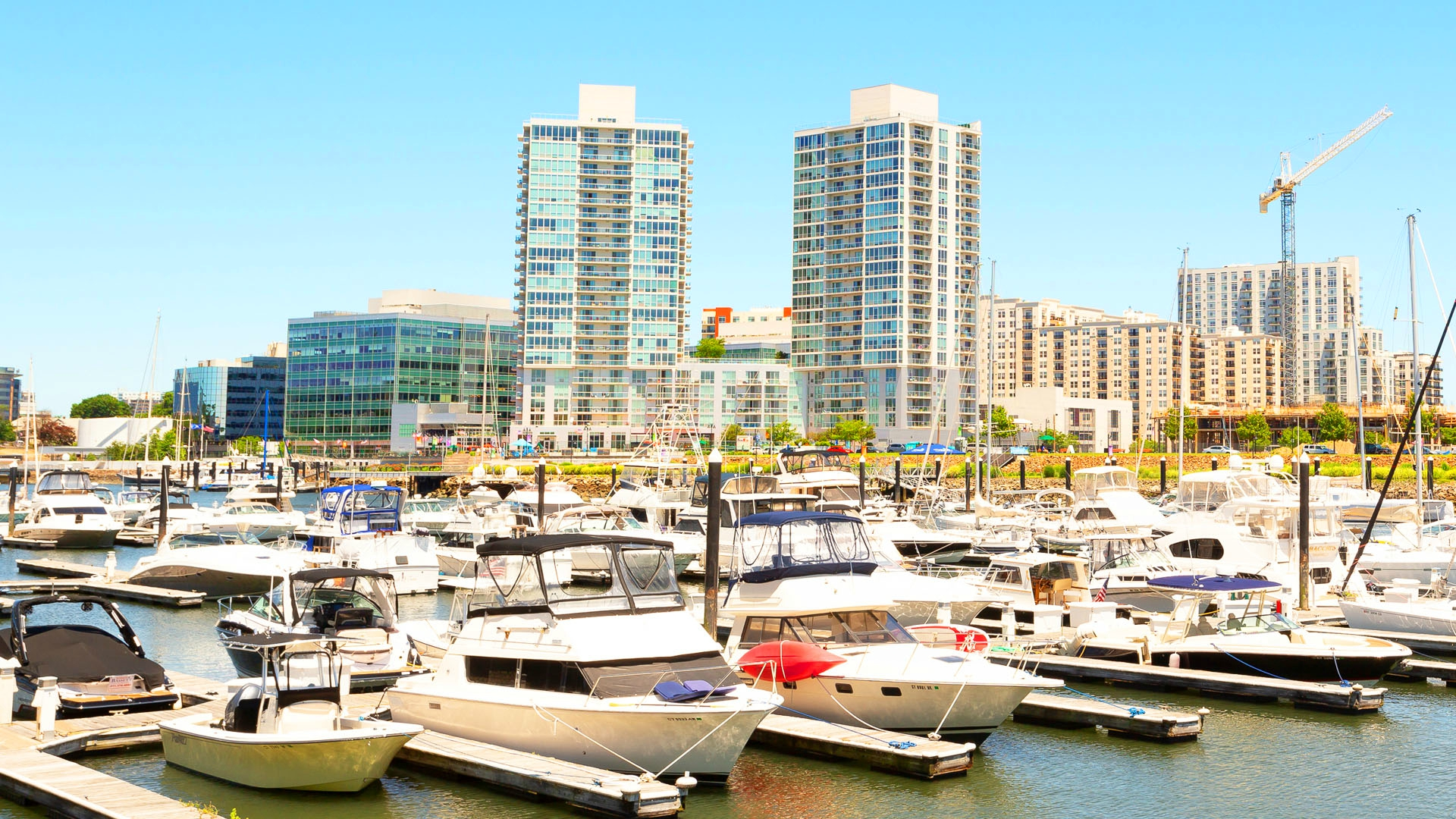
Harbor Point Marina in Stamford, Connecticut during summer

The climate of New England varies greatly across its 500-mile (800 km) span from northern Maine to southern Connecticut.

Maine, Vermont, New Hampshire, and most of interior western Massachusetts have a humid continental climate (Dfb under the Köppen climate classification). In this region, the winters are long, cold, and heavy snow is common, courtesy of both coastal and continental low pressure systems. Most locations in this region receive between 60 and 120 inches or 1.52 and 3.05 metres of snow annually. The summer months are pleasantly warm in this region, but summer is rather short. Annual rainfall is typically spread evenly throughout the year, although droughts have historically been most common during the summer months. Cities like Bangor, Maine; Portland, Maine; Manchester, New Hampshire; Burlington, Vermont; and Pittsfield, Massachusetts average around 45 inches (1,100 mm) of rainfall and 60 to 90 inches (1.52 to 2.29 m) of snow annually. The frost-free growing season ranges from just 90 days in far northern Maine and in the valleys of the White and Green Mountains, to as much as 140 days along the Southern Maine coast and in most of western Massachusetts.

In eastern Massachusetts, northern Rhode Island, and northern Connecticut, a hot-summer version of the humid continental climate (Köppen Dfa) prevails. Here summers are hotter and winters shorter with less snowfall. Cities like Boston, Hartford, and Providence generally receive 35 to 50 inches or 0.89 to 1.27 metres of snow annually. Summers are often hot and humid, with high temperatures in the lower Connecticut River valley of southern Massachusetts and Connecticut between 85 and 90 °F (29 and 32 °C) regularly during June, July, and August. Convective thunderstorms are common in these months as well, some of which can become severe. The frost-free growing season ranges from 140 days in parts of central Massachusetts to near 160 days across interior Connecticut and inland Rhode Island.

Southern Rhode Island and southern Connecticut are the transition zone from continental climates to the north, to temperate climates (called subtropical in some climate classifications) to the south. In this region, summers can be quite long and hot, with humid, tropical air masses common between May and September. Convective thundershowers are common in summer. The coast of Connecticut from Stamford, through the New Haven area to the Newport, Rhode Island area is usually the mildest area of New England in winter. Winter precipitation in this area frequently falls in the form of rain or a wintry mix of sleet, rain, and wet snow. Seasonal snowfall is far less in this region than points inland, normally only 24 to 30 inches or 0.61 to 0.76 metres of snow annually), and in some years little snow falls. Cold snaps are normally brief in these southern and coastal areas. Winters also tend to be much sunnier in southern Connecticut and southern Rhode Island compared to northern and central New England. The frost-free growing season approaches 210 days along the Connecticut coast.

Tropical cyclones sometimes directly impact New England. The 1938 New England hurricane and Hurricane Carol in 1954 were especially devastating storms which made landfall in Southern New England. Other tropical systems that have directly impacted the region include Hurricane Donna, Hurricane Gloria, Hurricane Bob, Hurricane Irene, Hurricane Sandy, and Tropical Storm Isaias. While infrequent, tornadoes occasionally occur in the region, with notable events including the 1953 Worcester tornado, the Windsor Locks, Connecticut, tornado in 1979, and the 2011 New England tornado outbreak, which produced several destructive twisters throughout much of the region.

== Statistics for major cities and states ==
=== Northern ===
Climate data for Patrick Leahy Burlington International Airport, Vermont (1991–2020 normals, (Note: Mean monthly maxima and minima (i.e. the expected highest and lowest temperature readings at any point during the year or given month) calculated based on data at said location from 1991 to 2020.) extremes 1883–present (Note: Official records for Burlington were kept at downtown from December 1883 to 3 June 1943, and at Burlington Int'l since 4 June 1943. For more information, see ThreadEx.))
Month	Jan	Feb	Mar	Apr	May	Jun	Jul	Aug	Sep	Oct	Nov	Dec	Year
Record high °F (°C)	66 (19)	72 (22)	84 (29)	91 (33)	95 (35)	100 (38)	100 (38)	101 (38)	98 (37)	86 (30)	76 (24)	68 (20)	101 (38)
Mean maximum °F (°C)	51.7 (10.9)	50.6 (10.3)	62.0 (16.7)	78.0 (25.6)	86.5 (30.3)	91.4 (33.0)	92.2 (33.4)	90.9 (32.7)	87.0 (30.6)	76.0 (24.4)	66.2 (19.0)	54.2 (12.3)	94.4 (34.7)
Mean daily maximum °F (°C)	28.9 (−1.7)	31.5 (−0.3)	40.9 (4.9)	55.3 (12.9)	69.0 (20.6)	77.6 (25.3)	82.4 (28.0)	80.7 (27.1)	72.6 (22.6)	58.9 (14.9)	46.4 (8.0)	35.0 (1.7)	56.6 (13.7)
Daily mean °F (°C)	20.9 (−6.2)	22.9 (−5.1)	32.3 (0.2)	45.6 (7.6)	58.4 (14.7)	67.5 (19.7)	72.4 (22.4)	70.7 (21.5)	62.7 (17.1)	50.3 (10.2)	39.3 (4.1)	28.2 (−2.1)	47.6 (8.7)
Mean daily minimum °F (°C)	12.9 (−10.6)	14.3 (−9.8)	23.6 (−4.7)	35.9 (2.2)	47.8 (8.8)	57.3 (14.1)	62.4 (16.9)	60.7 (15.9)	52.9 (11.6)	41.8 (5.4)	32.1 (0.1)	21.3 (−5.9)	38.6 (3.7)
Mean minimum °F (°C)	−12.7 (−24.8)	−7.8 (−22.1)	0.0 (−17.8)	21.2 (−6.0)	32.2 (0.1)	42.3 (5.7)	50.4 (10.2)	47.4 (8.6)	36.2 (2.3)	26.3 (−3.2)	13.7 (−10.2)	−1.6 (−18.7)	−15.3 (−26.3)
Record low °F (°C)	−30 (−34)	−30 (−34)	−24 (−31)	2 (−17)	24 (−4)	33 (1)	39 (4)	35 (2)	25 (−4)	15 (−9)	−3 (−19)	−29 (−34)	−30 (−34)
Average precipitation inches (mm)	2.13 (54)	1.77 (45)	2.24 (57)	3.07 (78)	3.76 (96)	4.26 (108)	4.06 (103)	3.54 (90)	3.67 (93)	3.83 (97)	2.70 (69)	2.50 (64)	37.53 (953)
Average snowfall inches (cm)	21.1 (54)	19.3 (49)	17.5 (44)	4.1 (10)	0.0 (0.0)	0.0 (0.0)	0.0 (0.0)	0.0 (0.0)	0.0 (0.0)	0.3 (0.76)	5.7 (14)	19.5 (50)	87.5 (222)
Average extreme snow depth inches (cm)	11.1 (28)	12.0 (30)	11.4 (29)	2.6 (6.6)	0.0 (0.0)	0.0 (0.0)	0.0 (0.0)	0.0 (0.0)	0.0 (0.0)	0.2 (0.51)	2.7 (6.9)	7.7 (20)	17.2 (44)
Average precipitation days (≥ 0.01 in)	14.7	12.1	12.7	13.2	13.6	13.6	12.8	11.7	11.0	12.9	13.7	15.2	157.2
Average snowy days (≥ 0.1 in)	14.3	12.1	8.7	2.9	0.1	0.0	0.0	0.0	0.0	0.4	4.6	11.6	54.7
Mean monthly sunshine hours	126.9	146.8	190.7	206.2	251.4	270.1	301.9	258.2	201.0	159.2	91.1	91.6	2,295.1
Percentage possible sunshine	44	50	52	51	55	58	64	59	53	47	32	33	51
Average ultraviolet index	1	2	3	5	7	8	8	7	5	3	2	1	4
Source 1: NOAA (sun 1961–1990)
Source 2: Weather Atlas (UV)

Climate data for Concord Municipal Airport, New Hampshire (1991−2020 normals, (Note: Mean monthly maxima and minima (i.e. the expected highest and lowest temperature readings at any point during the year or given month) calculated based on data at said location from 1991 to 2020.) extremes 1868–present) (Note: Official records for Concord were kept at downtown from September 1868 to April 1941 and at Concord Municipal Airport since May 1941; snow records date from December 1942. For more information, see ThreadEx)
Month	Jan	Feb	Mar	Apr	May	Jun	Jul	Aug	Sep	Oct	Nov	Dec	Year
Record high °F (°C)	72 (22)	74 (23)	89 (32)	95 (35)	98 (37)	101 (38)	102 (39)	101 (38)	98 (37)	92 (33)	80 (27)	73 (23)	102 (39)
Mean maximum °F (°C)	52.4 (11.3)	54.3 (12.4)	65.6 (18.7)	81.6 (27.6)	89.6 (32.0)	92.8 (33.8)	93.8 (34.3)	92.4 (33.6)	89.0 (31.7)	79.0 (26.1)	68.6 (20.3)	56.9 (13.8)	96.1 (35.6)
Mean daily maximum °F (°C)	31.6 (−0.2)	34.8 (1.6)	43.6 (6.4)	57.5 (14.2)	69.3 (20.7)	77.8 (25.4)	83.0 (28.3)	81.7 (27.6)	73.7 (23.2)	60.9 (16.1)	48.4 (9.1)	37.1 (2.8)	58.3 (14.6)
Daily mean °F (°C)	22.3 (−5.4)	24.7 (−4.1)	33.4 (0.8)	45.4 (7.4)	56.7 (13.7)	65.8 (18.8)	71.1 (21.7)	69.5 (20.8)	61.4 (16.3)	49.3 (9.6)	38.6 (3.7)	28.3 (−2.1)	47.2 (8.4)
Mean daily minimum °F (°C)	12.9 (−10.6)	14.7 (−9.6)	23.3 (−4.8)	33.3 (0.7)	44.1 (6.7)	53.7 (12.1)	59.2 (15.1)	57.2 (14.0)	49.0 (9.4)	37.8 (3.2)	28.7 (−1.8)	19.5 (−6.9)	36.1 (2.3)
Mean minimum °F (°C)	−9.2 (−22.9)	−7.2 (−21.8)	1.6 (−16.9)	19.2 (−7.1)	29.2 (−1.6)	39.0 (3.9)	47.1 (8.4)	44.1 (6.7)	32.1 (0.1)	22.1 (−5.5)	11.8 (−11.2)	−0.9 (−18.3)	−12.4 (−24.7)
Record low °F (°C)	−35 (−37)	−37 (−38)	−20 (−29)	4 (−16)	21 (−6)	26 (−3)	33 (1)	29 (−2)	20 (−7)	10 (−12)	−17 (−27)	−24 (−31)	−37 (−38)
Average precipitation inches (mm)	2.80 (71)	2.75 (70)	3.28 (83)	3.43 (87)	3.47 (88)	3.77 (96)	3.62 (92)	3.63 (92)	3.63 (92)	4.43 (113)	3.44 (87)	3.70 (94)	41.95 (1,066)
Average snowfall inches (cm)	17.1 (43)	16.9 (43)	13.6 (35)	2.5 (6.4)	0.0 (0.0)	0.0 (0.0)	0.0 (0.0)	0.0 (0.0)	0.0 (0.0)	0.8 (2.0)	2.5 (6.4)	14.3 (36)	67.7 (172)
Average extreme snow depth inches (cm)	11.9 (30)	15.3 (39)	13.9 (35)	4.0 (10)	0.0 (0.0)	0.0 (0.0)	0.0 (0.0)	0.0 (0.0)	0.0 (0.0)	0.6 (1.5)	2.0 (5.1)	9.1 (23)	19.8 (50)
Average precipitation days (≥ 0.01 in)	11.2	10.0	11.5	11.4	12.4	12.8	10.9	9.9	9.3	10.6	10.8	12.0	132.8
Average snowy days (≥ 0.1 in)	8.1	7.6	5.2	1.3	0.0	0.0	0.0	0.0	0.0	0.2	1.6	6.3	30.3
Average relative humidity (%)	67.9	66.0	64.8	62.0	65.0	70.9	71.8	74.5	76.3	72.8	73.3	72.3	69.8
Average dew point °F (°C)	10.2 (−12.1)	12.0 (−11.1)	20.8 (−6.2)	29.8 (−1.2)	42.1 (5.6)	53.8 (12.1)	58.8 (14.9)	57.9 (14.4)	50.5 (10.3)	38.3 (3.5)	28.8 (−1.8)	16.7 (−8.5)	35.0 (1.7)
Mean monthly sunshine hours	162.8	171.8	210.5	223.2	258.4	274.3	295.8	261.9	214.7	183.4	127.8	134.8	2,519.4
Percentage possible sunshine	56	58	57	56	57	60	64	61	57	54	44	48	56
Average ultraviolet index	1	2	4	5	7	8	8	7	6	3	2	1	5
Source 1: NOAA (relative humidity , dew points and sun 1961–1990)
Source 2: Weather Atlas (UV)

Climate data for Portland International Jetport, Maine (1991–2020 normals, (Note: Mean monthly maxima and minima (i.e. the expected highest and lowest temperature readings at any point during the year or given month) calculated based on data at said location from 1991 to 2020.) extremes 1871–present (Note: Official records for Portland were kept at downtown from March 1871 to 24 November 1940, and at Portland Int'l Jetport (PWM) since 25 November 1940. Temperature records are limited to the period that PWM was the official site (i.e. since 1940) and are based on the Monthly Weather Summary product issued by the NWS office in Gray, Maine. precipitation and snowfall records date to 1871 and 1882, respectively.))
Month	Jan	Feb	Mar	Apr	May	Jun	Jul	Aug	Sep	Oct	Nov	Dec	Year
Record high °F (°C)	67 (19)	68 (20)	88 (31)	92 (33)	96 (36)	99 (37)	103 (39)	103 (39)	96 (36)	88 (31)	79 (26)	71 (22)	103 (39)
Mean maximum °F (°C)	51.8 (11.0)	51.5 (10.8)	61.2 (16.2)	74.5 (23.6)	85.4 (29.7)	89.2 (31.8)	91.6 (33.1)	90.0 (32.2)	86.6 (30.3)	75.3 (24.1)	65.4 (18.6)	55.6 (13.1)	93.5 (34.2)
Mean daily maximum °F (°C)	32.4 (0.2)	35.0 (1.7)	42.3 (5.7)	53.8 (12.1)	64.2 (17.9)	73.6 (23.1)	79.5 (26.4)	78.7 (25.9)	71.1 (21.7)	59.5 (15.3)	48.4 (9.1)	38.3 (3.5)	56.4 (13.6)
Daily mean °F (°C)	24.0 (−4.4)	26.2 (−3.2)	34.1 (1.2)	44.6 (7.0)	54.9 (12.7)	64.3 (17.9)	70.4 (21.3)	69.2 (20.7)	61.6 (16.4)	50.3 (10.2)	40.0 (4.4)	30.3 (−0.9)	47.5 (8.6)
Mean daily minimum °F (°C)	15.6 (−9.1)	17.3 (−8.2)	26.0 (−3.3)	35.4 (1.9)	45.5 (7.5)	55.0 (12.8)	61.2 (16.2)	59.7 (15.4)	52.1 (11.2)	41.0 (5.0)	31.7 (−0.2)	22.4 (−5.3)	38.6 (3.7)
Mean minimum °F (°C)	−6.1 (−21.2)	−2.2 (−19.0)	6.4 (−14.2)	23.7 (−4.6)	33.1 (0.6)	43.4 (6.3)	51.7 (10.9)	48.6 (9.2)	37.1 (2.8)	26.5 (−3.1)	16.0 (−8.9)	3.9 (−15.6)	−9.0 (−22.8)
Record low °F (°C)	−26 (−32)	−39 (−39)	−21 (−29)	8 (−13)	23 (−5)	33 (1)	40 (4)	33 (1)	23 (−5)	15 (−9)	−6 (−21)	−21 (−29)	−39 (−39)
Average precipitation inches (mm)	3.50 (89)	3.54 (90)	4.08 (104)	4.41 (112)	3.67 (93)	4.15 (105)	3.43 (87)	3.57 (91)	3.77 (96)	5.25 (133)	4.25 (108)	4.50 (114)	48.12 (1,222)
Average snowfall inches (cm)	18.6 (47)	16.6 (42)	13.6 (35)	2.8 (7.1)	0.0 (0.0)	0.0 (0.0)	0.0 (0.0)	0.0 (0.0)	0.0 (0.0)	0.2 (0.51)	2.3 (5.8)	14.6 (37)	68.7 (174)
Average extreme snow depth inches (cm)	11.5 (29)	11.5 (29)	11.9 (30)	2.3 (5.8)	0.0 (0.0)	0.0 (0.0)	0.0 (0.0)	0.0 (0.0)	0.0 (0.0)	0.1 (0.25)	1.3 (3.3)	8.2 (21)	17.6 (45)
Average precipitation days (≥ 0.01 in)	11.2	10.2	11.3	11.1	12.5	11.7	10.8	9.4	9.3	10.9	10.7	12.3	131.4
Average snowy days (≥ 0.1 in)	7.6	7.0	5.1	1.3	0.0	0.0	0.0	0.0	0.0	0.1	1.5	6.0	28.6
Average relative humidity (%)	66.8	65.2	66.3	66.8	71.1	74.7	75.3	76.3	76.7	73.9	72.6	70.2	71.3
Average dew point °F (°C)	11.5 (−11.4)	12.9 (−10.6)	21.7 (−5.7)	30.9 (−0.6)	42.6 (5.9)	53.1 (11.7)	59.2 (15.1)	58.5 (14.7)	50.9 (10.5)	39.7 (4.3)	30.0 (−1.1)	17.4 (−8.1)	35.7 (2.1)
Mean monthly sunshine hours	164.8	172.8	205.2	213.5	243.2	259.1	282.2	267.6	229.1	195.7	138.7	140.9	2,512.8
Percentage possible sunshine	57	59	55	53	53	56	60	62	61	57	48	51	56
Average ultraviolet index	1	2	3	5	7	8	8	7	5	3	2	1	4
Source 1: NOAA (relative humidity and sun 1961–1990)
Source 2: Weather Atlas (UV)

Water temperatures
Month	Jan	Feb	Mar	Apr	May	Jun	Jul	Aug	Sep	Oct	Nov	Dec	Year
Average sea temperature °F (°C)	41.3 (5.2)	38.8 (3.8)	38.0 (3.3)	41.6 (5.3)	46.7 (8.1)	54.6 (12.6)	61.3 (16.3)	63.7 (17.7)	60.5 (15.8)	54.9 (12.8)	49.6 (9.8)	45.3 (7.4)	49.7 (9.8)
Source: Weather Atlas

=== Central ===
Climate data for Boston, Massachusetts (Logan Airport), 1991−2020 normals, (Note: Mean monthly maxima and minima (i.e. the expected highest and lowest temperature readings at any point during the year or given month) calculated based on data at said location from 1991 to 2020.) extremes 1872−present (Note: Official records for Boston were kept at downtown from January 1872 to December 1935, and at Logan Airport (KBOS) since January 1936.)
Month	Jan	Feb	Mar	Apr	May	Jun	Jul	Aug	Sep	Oct	Nov	Dec	Year
Record high °F (°C)	74 (23)	73 (23)	89 (32)	94 (34)	97 (36)	102 (39)	104 (40)	102 (39)	102 (39)	90 (32)	83 (28)	76 (24)	104 (40)
Mean maximum °F (°C)	58.3 (14.6)	57.9 (14.4)	67.0 (19.4)	79.9 (26.6)	88.1 (31.2)	92.2 (33.4)	95.0 (35.0)	93.7 (34.3)	88.9 (31.6)	79.6 (26.4)	70.2 (21.2)	61.2 (16.2)	96.4 (35.8)
Mean daily maximum °F (°C)	36.8 (2.7)	39.0 (3.9)	45.5 (7.5)	56.4 (13.6)	66.5 (19.2)	76.2 (24.6)	82.1 (27.8)	80.4 (26.9)	73.1 (22.8)	62.1 (16.7)	51.6 (10.9)	42.2 (5.7)	59.3 (15.2)
Daily mean °F (°C)	29.9 (−1.2)	31.8 (−0.1)	38.3 (3.5)	48.6 (9.2)	58.4 (14.7)	68.0 (20.0)	74.1 (23.4)	72.7 (22.6)	65.6 (18.7)	54.8 (12.7)	44.7 (7.1)	35.7 (2.1)	51.9 (11.1)
Mean daily minimum °F (°C)	23.1 (−4.9)	24.6 (−4.1)	31.1 (−0.5)	40.8 (4.9)	50.3 (10.2)	59.7 (15.4)	66.0 (18.9)	65.1 (18.4)	58.2 (14.6)	47.5 (8.6)	37.9 (3.3)	29.2 (−1.6)	44.5 (6.9)
Mean minimum °F (°C)	4.8 (−15.1)	8.3 (−13.2)	15.6 (−9.1)	31.0 (−0.6)	41.2 (5.1)	49.7 (9.8)	58.6 (14.8)	57.7 (14.3)	46.7 (8.2)	35.1 (1.7)	24.4 (−4.2)	13.1 (−10.5)	2.6 (−16.3)
Record low °F (°C)	−13 (−25)	−18 (−28)	−8 (−22)	11 (−12)	31 (−1)	41 (5)	50 (10)	46 (8)	34 (1)	25 (−4)	−2 (−19)	−17 (−27)	−18 (−28)
Average precipitation inches (mm)	3.39 (86)	3.21 (82)	4.17 (106)	3.63 (92)	3.25 (83)	3.89 (99)	3.27 (83)	3.23 (82)	3.56 (90)	4.03 (102)	3.66 (93)	4.30 (109)	43.59 (1,107)
Average snowfall inches (cm)	14.3 (36)	14.4 (37)	9.0 (23)	1.6 (4.1)	0.0 (0.0)	0.0 (0.0)	0.0 (0.0)	0.0 (0.0)	0.0 (0.0)	0.2 (0.51)	0.7 (1.8)	9.0 (23)	49.2 (125)
Average precipitation days (≥ 0.01 in)	11.8	10.6	11.6	11.6	11.8	10.9	9.4	9.0	9.0	10.5	10.3	11.9	128.4
Average snowy days (≥ 0.1 in)	6.6	6.2	4.4	0.8	0.0	0.0	0.0	0.0	0.0	0.2	0.6	4.2	23.0
Average relative humidity (%)	62.3	62.0	63.1	63.0	66.7	68.5	68.4	70.8	71.8	68.5	67.5	65.4	66.5
Average dew point °F (°C)	19.8 (−6.8)	20.3 (−6.5)	26.2 (−3.2)	35.1 (1.7)	46.2 (7.9)	56.3 (13.5)	62.1 (16.7)	61.7 (16.5)	55.9 (13.3)	45.0 (7.2)	34.5 (1.4)	25.9 (−3.4)	40.8 (4.9)
Mean monthly sunshine hours	163.4	168.4	213.7	227.2	267.3	286.5	300.9	277.3	237.1	206.3	143.2	142.3	2,633.6
Percentage possible sunshine	56	57	58	57	59	63	65	64	63	60	49	50	59
Average ultraviolet index	1	2	4	5	7	8	8	8	6	4	2	1	5
Source 1: NOAA (relative humidity, and sun 1961−1990)
Source 2: Weather Atlas (UV)

Climate data for Boston, Massachusetts
Month	Jan	Feb	Mar	Apr	May	Jun	Jul	Aug	Sep	Oct	Nov	Dec	Year
Average sea temperature °F (°C)	41.3 (5.2)	38.1 (3.4)	38.4 (3.5)	43.1 (6.2)	49.2 (9.5)	58.4 (14.7)	65.7 (18.7)	67.9 (20.0)	64.8 (18.2)	59.4 (15.3)	52.3 (11.3)	46.6 (8.2)	52.1 (11.2)
Source: Weather Atlas

Climate data for Providence, Rhode Island (T. F. Green Airport), 1991–2020 normals, (Note: Mean monthly maxima and minima (i.e. the expected highest and lowest temperature readings at any point during the year or given month) calculated based on data at said location from 1991 to 2020.) extremes 1904–present (Note: Official records for Providence kept at downtown from November 1904 to May 1932 and at T. F. Green Airport since June 1932.)
Month	Jan	Feb	Mar	Apr	May	Jun	Jul	Aug	Sep	Oct	Nov	Dec	Year
Record high °F (°C)	70 (21)	72 (22)	90 (32)	98 (37)	96 (36)	100 (38)	102 (39)	104 (40)	100 (38)	88 (31)	81 (27)	77 (25)	104 (40)
Mean maximum °F (°C)	58.7 (14.8)	57.9 (14.4)	67.1 (19.5)	79.3 (26.3)	87.2 (30.7)	91.5 (33.1)	94.8 (34.9)	92.7 (33.7)	87.6 (30.9)	78.9 (26.1)	70.1 (21.2)	61.5 (16.4)	96.6 (35.9)
Mean daily maximum °F (°C)	38.3 (3.5)	40.5 (4.7)	47.7 (8.7)	58.9 (14.9)	68.9 (20.5)	77.7 (25.4)	83.6 (28.7)	82.2 (27.9)	74.8 (23.8)	63.8 (17.7)	53.2 (11.8)	43.4 (6.3)	61.1 (16.2)
Daily mean °F (°C)	30.2 (−1.0)	32.0 (0.0)	38.9 (3.8)	49.3 (9.6)	59.1 (15.1)	68.2 (20.1)	74.4 (23.6)	73.0 (22.8)	65.6 (18.7)	54.4 (12.4)	44.5 (6.9)	35.5 (1.9)	52.1 (11.2)
Mean daily minimum °F (°C)	22.1 (−5.5)	23.5 (−4.7)	30.2 (−1.0)	39.6 (4.2)	49.2 (9.6)	58.8 (14.9)	65.2 (18.4)	63.9 (17.7)	56.5 (13.6)	45.1 (7.3)	35.8 (2.1)	27.6 (−2.4)	43.1 (6.2)
Mean minimum °F (°C)	4.1 (−15.5)	7.4 (−13.7)	15.1 (−9.4)	28.5 (−1.9)	38.1 (3.4)	47.2 (8.4)	56.2 (13.4)	54.3 (12.4)	43.1 (6.2)	31.7 (−0.2)	21.8 (−5.7)	12.3 (−10.9)	2.0 (−16.7)
Record low °F (°C)	−13 (−25)	−17 (−27)	1 (−17)	11 (−12)	29 (−2)	39 (4)	48 (9)	40 (4)	32 (0)	20 (−7)	6 (−14)	−12 (−24)	−17 (−27)
Average precipitation inches (mm)	3.96 (101)	3.44 (87)	4.90 (124)	4.29 (109)	3.37 (86)	3.81 (97)	2.91 (74)	3.59 (91)	4.17 (106)	4.18 (106)	4.27 (108)	4.65 (118)	47.54 (1,208)
Average snowfall inches (cm)	10.3 (26)	10.5 (27)	6.4 (16)	0.6 (1.5)	0.0 (0.0)	0.0 (0.0)	0.0 (0.0)	0.0 (0.0)	0.0 (0.0)	0.2 (0.51)	1.0 (2.5)	7.6 (19)	36.6 (93)
Average precipitation days (≥ 0.01 in)	11.2	10.3	11.6	11.7	12.2	10.8	9.3	9.1	9.1	10.2	9.6	11.9	127.0
Average snowy days (≥ 0.1 in)	5.7	5.4	3.7	0.4	0.0	0.0	0.0	0.0	0.0	0.1	0.6	3.4	19.3
Average relative humidity (%)	63.9	63.0	62.9	61.4	66.6	70.1	71.0	72.5	73.0	70.2	68.9	67.0	67.5
Average dew point °F (°C)	16.3 (−8.7)	17.4 (−8.1)	25.0 (−3.9)	33.1 (0.6)	45.0 (7.2)	55.6 (13.1)	61.5 (16.4)	61.0 (16.1)	53.8 (12.1)	42.6 (5.9)	33.3 (0.7)	22.1 (−5.5)	38.9 (3.8)
Mean monthly sunshine hours	171.7	172.6	215.6	225.1	254.9	274.1	290.6	262.8	233.0	208.7	148.0	148.6	2,605.7
Percentage possible sunshine	58	58	58	56	57	60	63	61	62	61	50	52	58
Average ultraviolet index	1	2	4	6	7	8	8	8	6	4	2	1	5
Source 1: NOAA (relative humidity, dew point, and sun 1961–1990)
Source 2: Weather Atlas

Climate data for Providence
Month	Jan	Feb	Mar	Apr	May	Jun	Jul	Aug	Sep	Oct	Nov	Dec	Year
Average sea temperature °F (°C)	41.4 (5.2)	38.1 (3.4)	38.7 (3.8)	44.1 (6.7)	50.9 (10.5)	59.6 (15.3)	67.0 (19.4)	69.3 (20.7)	66.7 (19.3)	61.6 (16.4)	54.2 (12.3)	47.7 (8.8)	53.3 (11.8)
Source: Weather Atlas

=== Southern coastal ===
Climate data for Bridgeport, Connecticut (Sikorsky Airport), 1990–2020 normals, extremes 1948–present
Month	Jan	Feb	Mar	Apr	May	Jun	Jul	Aug	Sep	Oct	Nov	Dec	Year
Record high °F (°C)	68 (20)	67 (19)	84 (29)	91 (33)	97 (36)	97 (36)	103 (39)	100 (38)	99 (37)	89 (32)	78 (26)	76 (24)	103 (39)
Mean maximum °F (°C)	55.2 (12.9)	55.4 (13.0)	65.8 (18.8)	76.4 (24.7)	83.7 (28.7)	89.9 (32.2)	92.9 (33.8)	91.4 (33.0)	85.1 (29.5)	76.6 (24.8)	67.4 (19.7)	58.6 (14.8)	94.6 (34.8)
Mean daily maximum °F (°C)	38.4 (3.6)	40.5 (4.7)	47.4 (8.6)	58.3 (14.6)	68.4 (20.2)	77.7 (25.4)	83.4 (28.6)	81.9 (27.7)	75.4 (24.1)	64.4 (18.0)	53.6 (12.0)	43.8 (6.6)	61.1 (16.2)
Daily mean °F (°C)	31.2 (−0.4)	33.1 (0.6)	39.9 (4.4)	50.0 (10.0)	60.0 (15.6)	69.6 (20.9)	75.7 (24.3)	74.5 (23.6)	67.6 (19.8)	56.4 (13.6)	46.0 (7.8)	37.0 (2.8)	53.4 (11.9)
Mean daily minimum °F (°C)	24.4 (−4.2)	25.7 (−3.5)	32.3 (0.2)	41.7 (5.4)	51.7 (10.9)	61.5 (16.4)	67.9 (19.9)	67.0 (19.4)	59.8 (15.4)	48.3 (9.1)	38.4 (3.6)	30.2 (−1.0)	45.4 (7.4)
Mean minimum °F (°C)	5.3 (−14.8)	9.8 (−12.3)	16.3 (−8.7)	30.0 (−1.1)	39.7 (4.3)	49.5 (9.7)	57.0 (13.9)	54.9 (12.7)	44.6 (7.0)	33.4 (0.8)	23.8 (−4.6)	12.9 (−10.6)	3.5 (−15.8)
Record low °F (°C)	−7 (−22)	−6 (−21)	4 (−16)	18 (−8)	31 (−1)	41 (5)	49 (9)	44 (7)	36 (2)	26 (−3)	13 (−11)	−4 (−20)	−7 (−22)
Average precipitation inches (mm)	3.10 (79)	2.79 (71)	4.05 (103)	4.13 (105)	3.80 (97)	3.61 (92)	3.46 (88)	3.96 (101)	3.48 (88)	3.64 (92)	3.39 (86)	3.33 (85)	42.74 (1,087)
Average snowfall inches (cm)	7.7 (20)	8.1 (21)	5.1 (13)	0.9 (2.3)	0 (0)	0 (0)	0 (0)	0 (0)	0 (0)	0 (0)	0.7 (1.8)	5.1 (13)	27.6 (71.1)
Average precipitation days (≥ 0.01 inch)	10.9	9.7	11.3	11.0	11.8	11.1	8.9	8.9	8.2	8.8	10.0	11.1	121.7
Average snowy days (≥ 0.1 inch)	4.8	3.5	2.4	0.3	0	0	0	0	0	0	0.5	3.1	14.6
Source: NOAA Climate data for Martha's Vineyard (Edgartown, Massachusetts) 1991–2020 normals, extremes 1946–present: Month / Jan / Feb / Mar / Apr / May / Jun / Jul / Aug / Sep / Oct / Nov / Dec / Year; Record high °F (°C) / 65 (18) / 64 (18) / 75 (24) / 90 (32) / 91 (33) / 95 (35) / 95 (35) / 99 (37) / 92 (33) / 88 (31) / 74 (23) / 67 (19) / 99 (37); Mean daily maximum °F (°C) / 40.1 (4.5) / 41.5 (5.3) / 46.4 (8.0) / 55.4 (13.0) / 64.9 (18.3) / 73.8 (23.2) / 80.4 (26.9) / 79.9 (26.6) / 74.0 (23.3) / 64.0 (17.8) / 54.4 (12.4) / 45.5 (7.5) / 60.0 (15.6); Daily mean °F (°C) / 32.9 (0.5) / 34.1 (1.2) / 39.0 (3.9) / 47.5 (8.6) / 56.7 (13.7) / 65.7 (18.7) / 72.3 (22.4) / 71.9 (22.2) / 66.2 (19.0) / 56.1 (13.4) / 47.0 (8.3) / 38.4 (3.6) / 52.3 (11.3); Mean daily minimum °F (°C) / 25.6 (−3.6) / 26.8 (−2.9) / 31.7 (−0.2) / 39.5 (4.2) / 48.6 (9.2) / 57.6 (14.2) / 64.2 (17.9) / 63.9 (17.7) / 58.4 (14.7) / 48.2 (9.0) / 39.7 (4.3) / 31.3 (−0.4) / 44.6 (7.0); Record low °F (°C) / −6 (−21) / −9 (−23) / −7 (−22) / 12 (−11) / 28 (−2) / 37 (3) / 45 (7) / 41 (5) / 32 (0) / 22 (−6) / 14 (−10) / −5 (−21) / −9 (−23); Average precipitation inches (mm) / 4.10 (104) / 3.57 (91) / 4.80 (122) / 4.18 (106) / 3.74 (95) / 3.39 (86) / 2.64 (67) / 3.72 (94) / 3.89 (99) / 4.63 (118) / 4.21 (107) / 4.84 (123) / 47.71 (1,212); Average snowfall inches (cm) / 8.8 (22) / 8.1 (21) / 4.7 (12) / 0.3 (0.76) / 0.0 (0.0) / 0.0 (0.0) / 0.0 (0.0) / 0.0 (0.0) / 0.0 (0.0) / 0.0 (0.0) / 0.0 (0.0) / 3.4 (8.6) / 25.3 (64); Average precipitation days (≥ 0.01 in) / 11.9 / 9.8 / 11.4 / 11.9 / 12.0 / 10.2 / 7.8 / 8.9 / 9.3 / 11.2 / 11.4 / 12.1 / 127.9; Average snowy days (≥ 0.1 in) / 3.5 / 3.3 / 2.0 / 0.2 / 0.0 / 0.0 / 0.0 / 0.0 / 0.0 / 0.0 / 0.1 / 1.4 / 10.5; Source: NOAA Climate data for Nantucket, Massachusetts (Nantucket Memorial Airport) 1991–2020 normals, extremes 1948–present: Month / Jan / Feb / Mar / Apr / May / Jun / Jul / Aug / Sep / Oct / Nov / Dec / Year; Record high °F (°C) / 63 (17) / 59 (15) / 66 (19) / 83 (28) / 85 (29) / 92 (33) / 92 (33) / 100 (38) / 86 (30) / 83 (28) / 74 (23) / 63 (17) / 100 (38); Mean daily maximum °F (°C) / 39.5 (4.2) / 40.1 (4.5) / 44.2 (6.8) / 52.2 (11.2) / 60.7 (15.9) / 68.7 (20.4) / 75.4 (24.1) / 75.7 (24.3) / 70.4 (21.3) / 61.9 (16.6) / 52.8 (11.6) / 45.1 (7.3) / 57.2 (14.0); Daily mean °F (°C) / 33.1 (0.6) / 33.5 (0.8) / 37.9 (3.3) / 45.5 (7.5) / 53.8 (12.1) / 62.2 (16.8) / 69.0 (20.6) / 69.0 (20.6) / 63.7 (17.6) / 55.2 (12.9) / 46.4 (8.0) / 38.6 (3.7) / 50.7 (10.4); Mean daily minimum °F (°C) / 26.6 (−3.0) / 27.0 (−2.8) / 31.5 (−0.3) / 38.8 (3.8) / 47.0 (8.3) / 55.7 (13.2) / 62.6 (17.0) / 62.4 (16.9) / 57.0 (13.9) / 48.6 (9.2) / 40.0 (4.4) / 32.2 (0.1) / 44.1 (6.7); Record low °F (°C) / −3 (−19) / −2 (−19) / 7 (−14) / 20 (−7) / 28 (−2) / 35 (2) / 47 (8) / 39 (4) / 34 (1) / 22 (−6) / 16 (−9) / −3 (−19) / −3 (−19); Average precipitation inches (mm) / 3.18 (81) / 2.84 (72) / 3.84 (98) / 3.60 (91) / 2.98 (76) / 3.00 (76) / 2.72 (69) / 3.00 (76) / 3.59 (91) / 4.39 (112) / 3.79 (96) / 3.93 (100) / 40.86 (1,038); Average snowfall inches (cm) / 7.4 (19) / 8.5 (22) / 6.6 (17) / 0.8 (2.0) / 0.0 (0.0) / 0.0 (0.0) / 0.0 (0.0) / 0.0 (0.0) / 0.0 (0.0) / 0.0 (0.0) / 0.2 (0.51) / 5.8 (15) / 29.4 (75); Average precipitation days (≥ 0.01 in) / 11.6 / 10.2 / 10.5 / 11.9 / 11.7 / 11.6 / 11.9 / 13.1 / 12.5 / 13.1 / 10.9 / 12.4 / 141.4; Source 1: NOAA Source 2: Western Regional Climate Center (snow 1948−present)

== See also ==
- Autumn in New England
- Climate of Massachusetts
