= Dinosaur State Park and Arboretum =

Natural history preserve in Rocky Hill, Connecticut

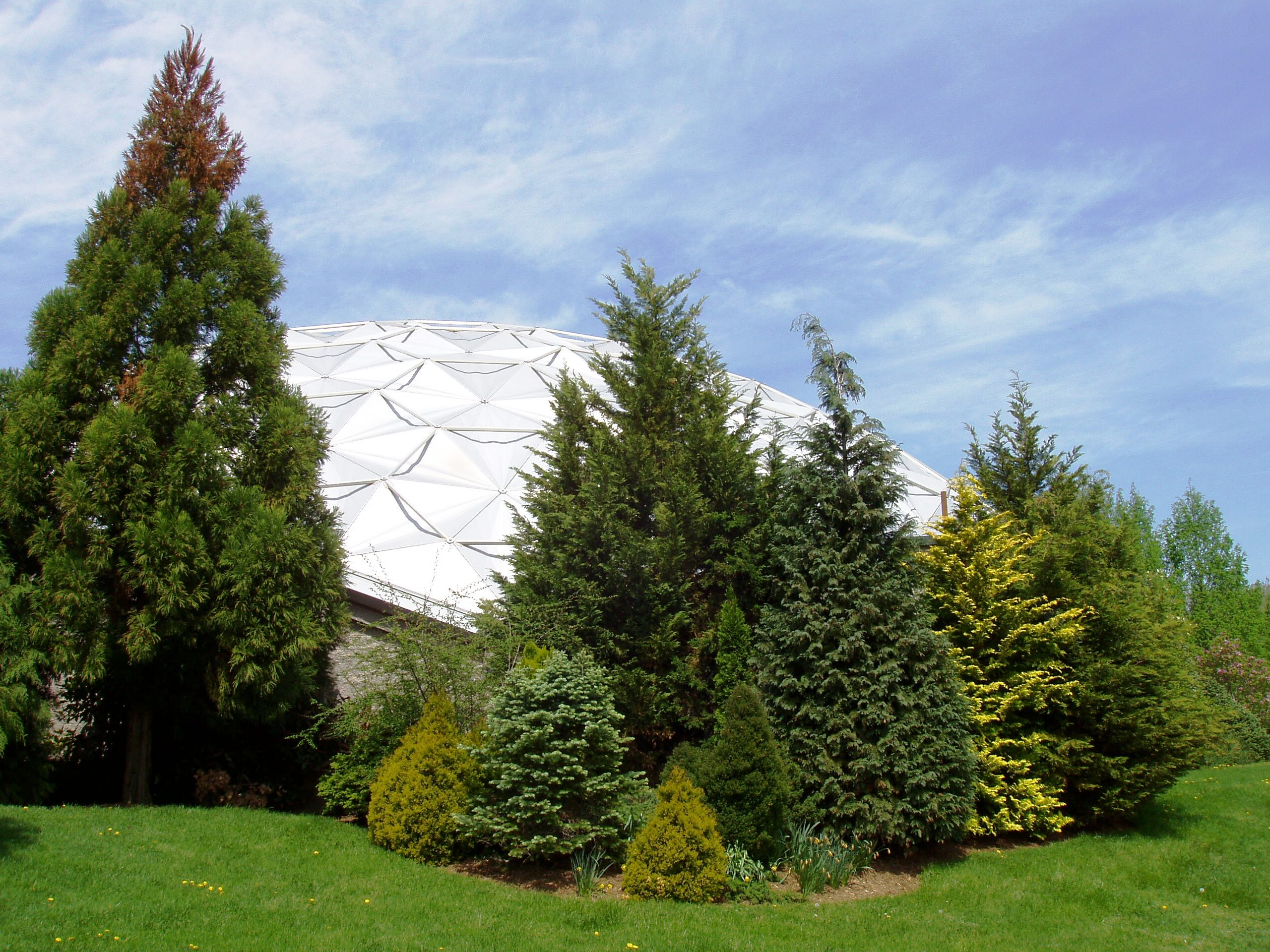
- The park's geodesic dome

- Location within Connecticut Location within the United States
- Location: Rocky Hill, Connecticut, United States
- Coordinates: 41°39′03″N 72°39′28″W
- Area: 80 acres (32 ha)
- Elevation: 187 ft (57 m)
- Established: 1968
- Administrator: Connecticut Department of Energy and Environmental Protection
- Designation: Connecticut state park
- Website: ctparks.com/parks/dinosaur-state-park

U.S. National Natural Landmark
- Designated: April 1968

Dinosaur State Park and Arboretum is a state-owned natural history preserve occupying 80 acres (32 ha) in the town of Rocky Hill, Connecticut. The state park protects one of the largest dinosaur track sites in North America. The park was created in recognition of fossil trackways embedded in sandstone from the beginning of the Jurassic period, about 200 million years ago. The facility is managed by the Connecticut Department of Energy and Environmental Protection.

== History ==
The Rocky Hill dinosaur tracks were uncovered in 1966, adding to the extensive legacy of fossil discoveries made in the Connecticut Valley since the 19th century. A bulldozer operator noticed the tracks while excavating the site for a new state office building. The site opened as Dinosaur State Park in 1968, the same year its 7-acre (2.8 ha) dinosaur trackway was memorialized as a Registered National Landmark.

== Features ==
Geodesic dome

The park's 55,000-square-foot (5,100 m^{2}) geodesic dome encloses some 500 tracks while another 1,500 remain buried for preservation. The sandstone layer preserving the tracks is a section of the East Berlin Formation, which corresponds to a sandy lakeshore from the Early Jurassic, over 200 million years ago. The largest and most plentiful footprints bear the name Eubrontes, an ichnogenus (fossilized footprint type) named by geologist Edward Hitchcock. They were probably created by a carnivorous theropod dinosaur similar to Dilophosaurus. The Eubrontes tracks range from 10 to 16 inches (410 mm) in length and are spaced 3.5 to 4.5 feet (1.4 m) apart.

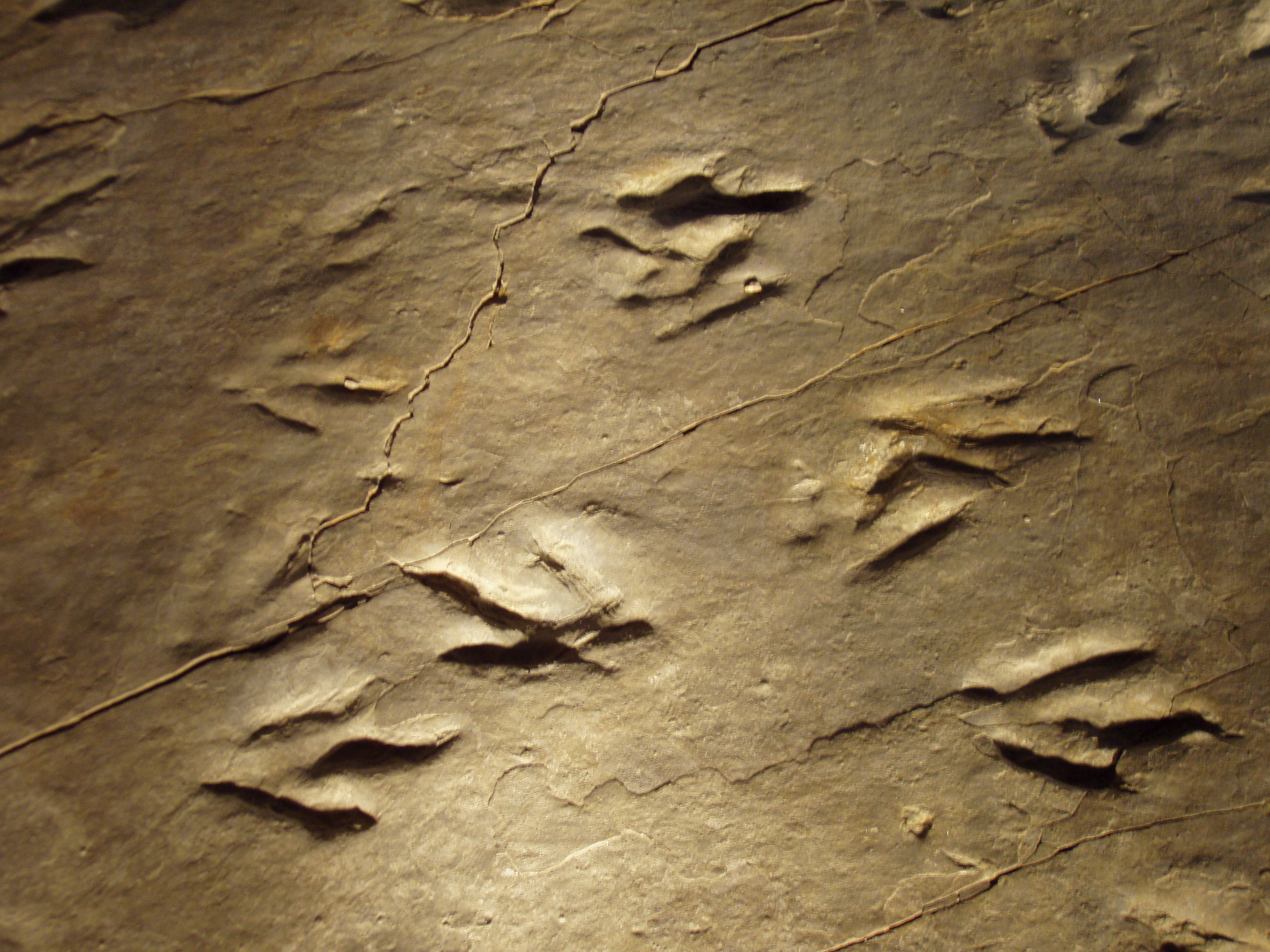
Close-up of Eubrontes prints from Dinosaur State Park

In addition to the tracks, the dome houses life-sized dioramas of plants and creatures, including Dilophosaurus, from depict the Triassic and Jurassic periods. Other exhibits include interactive displays; a reconstruction of a geologic foundation; and a historical exhibit depicting highlights of the unearthing of the tracks in 1966. The discovery room houses a blue-tongued skink, ball python, and dinosaur-related arts and crafts. Rock slabs with other Connecticut Valley fossil tracks, including large four-toed Otozoum tracks with visible skin impressions, can also be seen.

Arboretum

The arboretum's 2 miles (3.2 km) of trails pass through some 250 species and cultivars of conifers, plus collections of arborvitae, chamaecyparis, ginkgo, juniper, katsura, pine, sequoia, and magnolia. Rarer species in the collection include the evergreen southern magnolia and monkey puzzle. The addition of woody plants from Cretaceous angiosperm families has been part of the arboretum's attempt to grow as many representatives of Mesozoic-era plant families as the site's New England climate will allow.

Events and activities

The park offers educational films, guided trail walks, and lectures. Warm-month activities include footprint track casting and mining for gems and fossils. In August, Dinosaur State Park Day offers games, arts and crafts activities, and live music. There is a stone path that leads to the domed museum with a timeline showing the evolution of earth from its formation to today. From May to October, visitors can see an outdoor exhibit teaching how paleontologists ply their trade. There are two and a half miles of hiking trails in the park.

== See also ==
- Connecticut River Valley trackways
- Dinosaur Footprints Reservation
