= Dinosaur Footprints Reservation =

Nature reserve

Coordinates: 42.241682°N 72.623336°W

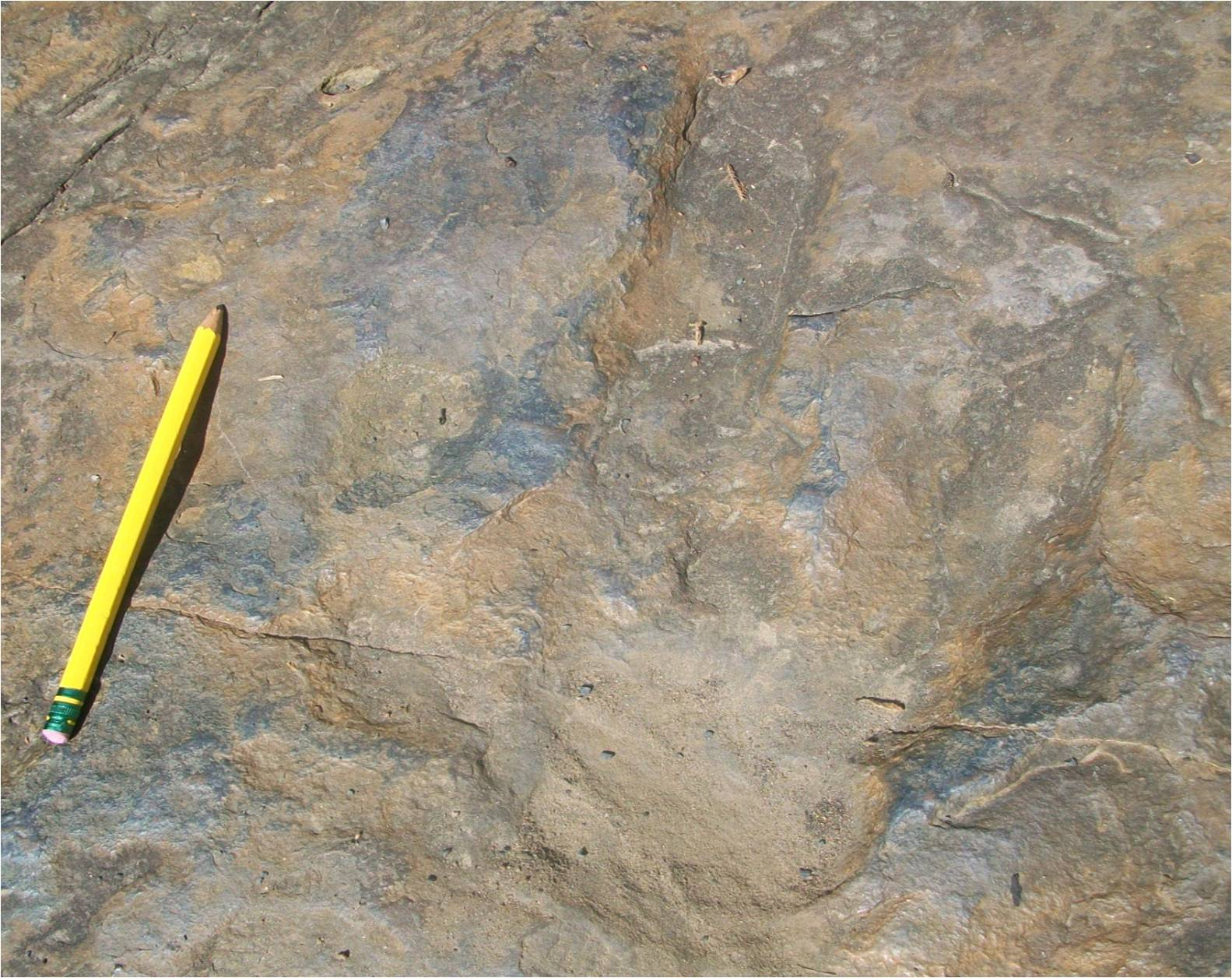
A footprint of Eubrontes, the most common dinosaur ichnogenus found at Dinosaur Footprints.

Dinosaur Footprints in Holyoke, Massachusetts, USA is an 8-acre (3 ha) wilderness reservation purchased for the public in 1935 by The Trustees of Reservations. The Reservation is currently being managed with the assistance from the Massachusetts Department of Conservation and Recreation (DCR). The fossil and plant resources on the adjacent Holyoke Gas and Electric (HG&E) riverfront property are being managed cooperatively by The Trustees, Mass DCR, and HG&E.

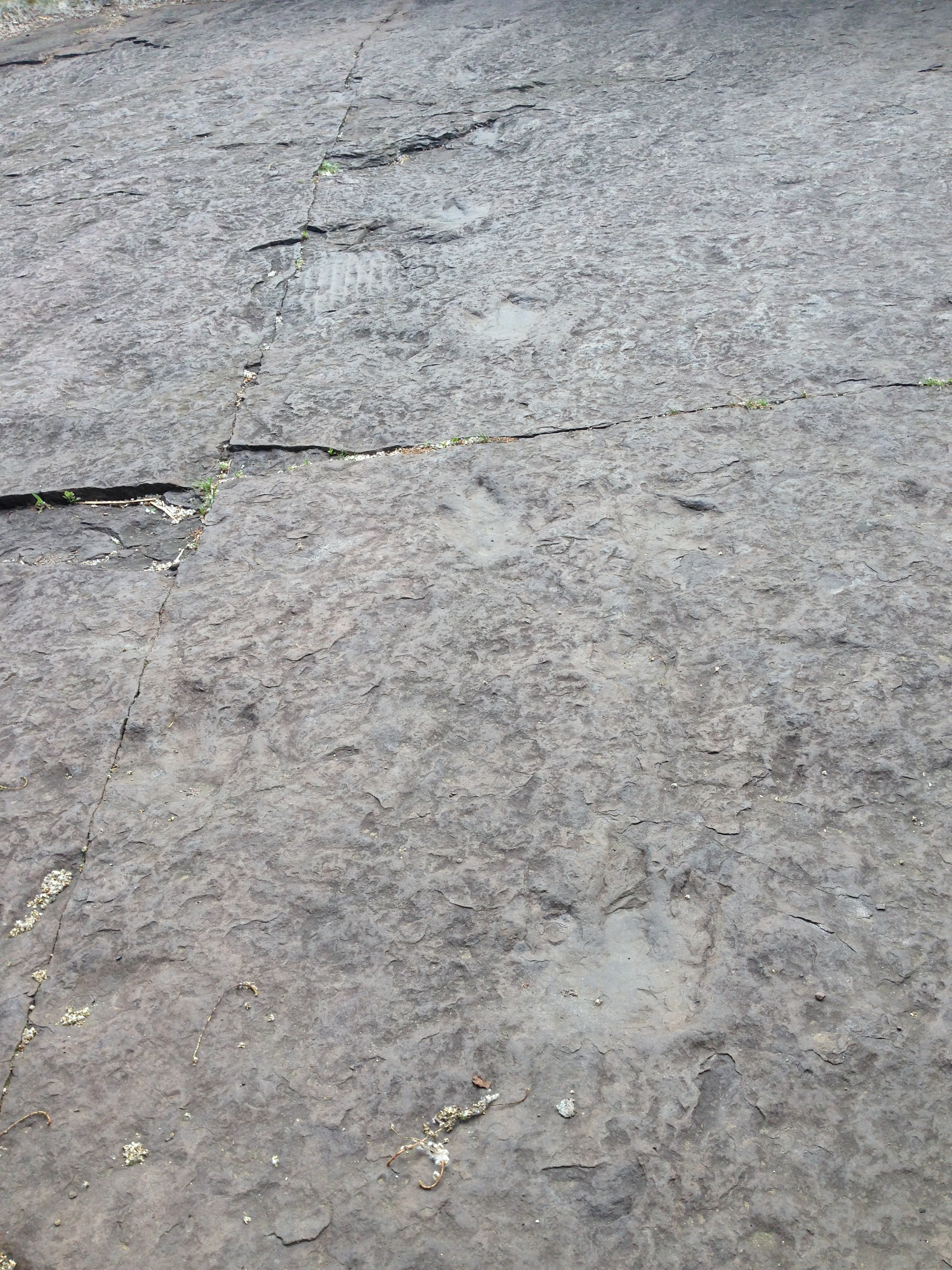
the footprints in a row, as the dinosaurs walked

The dinosaur tracks at this site were among the first to be scientifically described in 1836, and are still visible to visitors. Hundreds of tracks, which were made by as many as four distinct types of two-legged dinosaur, are present in the sandstone outcrops. Additional fossils that have been found at the site or nearby include invertebrate burrows, fish, and plants (including charcoalified logs and leaves). The parallel orientation of many of the dinosaur trackways was among the first lines of evidence used to support the novel theory that dinosaurs traveled in packs or groups.

== Fossils ==
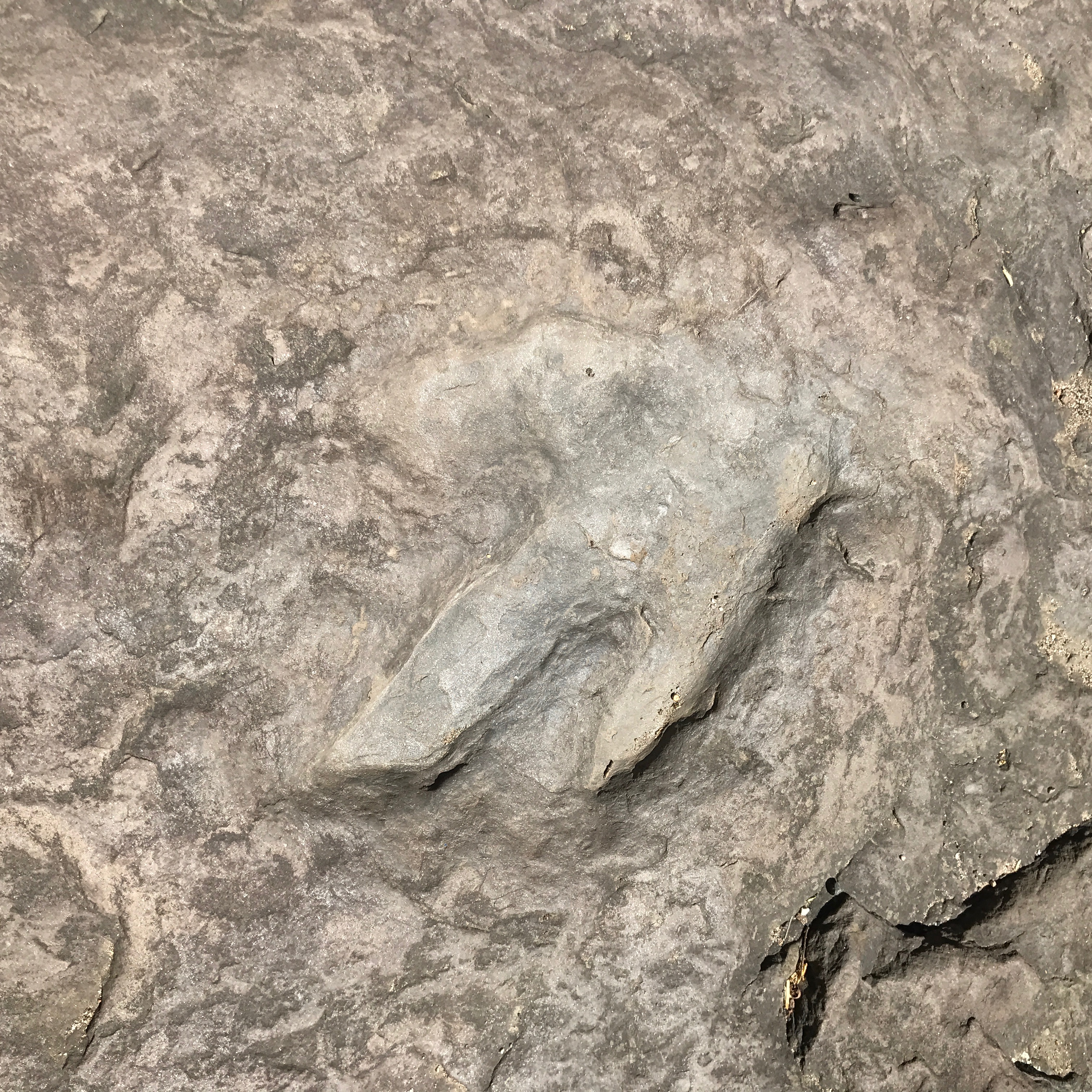
One of the footprints at the Dinosaur Footprints Reservation.

As the name implies, fossil footprints are this park's main attraction. They were formed during the Early Jurassic period (approximately 200 million years ago) when what is now the Connecticut River Valley was a subtropical region filled with lakes and swamps. Bipedal, carnivorous dinosaurs up to 20 feet (6 m) long left footprints on the ancient mudflats. The area was acclaimed by 19th century paleontologists for its abundance of fossil specimens, dinosaur tracks in particular, and the reservation is popular with the ichnologists who study them. This area was first studied by Edward Hitchcock, the Amherst College professor who advanced the revolutionary notion that rather than being cold-blooded reptiles, dinosaurs were more like a sort of "reptilian bird." In the 1930s, a Springfield, Massachusetts newspaper poked fun at this notion by referring to the animals that left the fossilized footprints as "the Giant Turkeys of Prof. Hitchcock."

In the last two centuries the site has drawn the attention of numerous palaeontologists, including Thomas Henry Huxley, who visited the site during his trip to America in August 1876. The late John Ostrom of Yale University mapped the site and reported finding 134 tracks preserved in the sandstone beds in a seminal paper he wrote on dinosaur gregariousness. Ostrom attributed the tracks to small, medium, and large theropod dinosaurs, and assigned the tracks to the ichnospecies Grallator cuneatus, which are 3 inches (76 mm) to 5 inches (127 mm) long, Anchisauripus sillimani, and Eubrontes giganteus, which are 11 inches (279 mm) to 13 inches (330 mm) long. The parallel orientation of the Eubrontes giganteus trackways and the supposed lack of a physical barrier led Ostrom to the conclusion that the large animals were gregarious and traveled in a "herd, pack, or flock."

The latest mapping project, conducted by Patrick Getty and Aaron Judge, has shown that there are at least 787 dinosaur tracks at the site and that the Eubrontes giganteus trackways are in fact parallel, or nearly parallel, to the orientation of oscillation wave-formed ripples. Considering that oscillation ripples form parallel to the shoreline, these authors suggested that the parallel trackways represent shoreline-paralleling behavior in large carnivores rather than group behavior. The hypothesis that the parallel trackways were made by shoreline-paralleling behavior is further supported by the fact that parallelism is not seen in Eubrontes giganteus trackways preserved at other sites in the Connecticut River Valley. In addition to the footprints of theropod dinosaurs, those of early ornithischians, called Anomoepus scambus (some with associated tail drags), have been identified at Dinosaur Footprint Reservation. Non-dinosaurs are represented by footprints called Batrachopus, which were made by basal crocodilians.

Smith College professor William J. Miller wrote in his Geological History of the Connecticut Valley of Massachusetts:

The largest numbers by far have been found at various localities in the general direction of Turner's Falls and South Hadley. In regard to the perfect preservation of such a vast number of geologically ancient animal tracks no district in the world is at all comparable with the Connecticut Valley ... In one case the writer is able to step, with a stride of about three and a half feet, in a series of eleven footprints, each about a foot long, exactly where a giant dinosaur left his foot print impressions on the original surface.

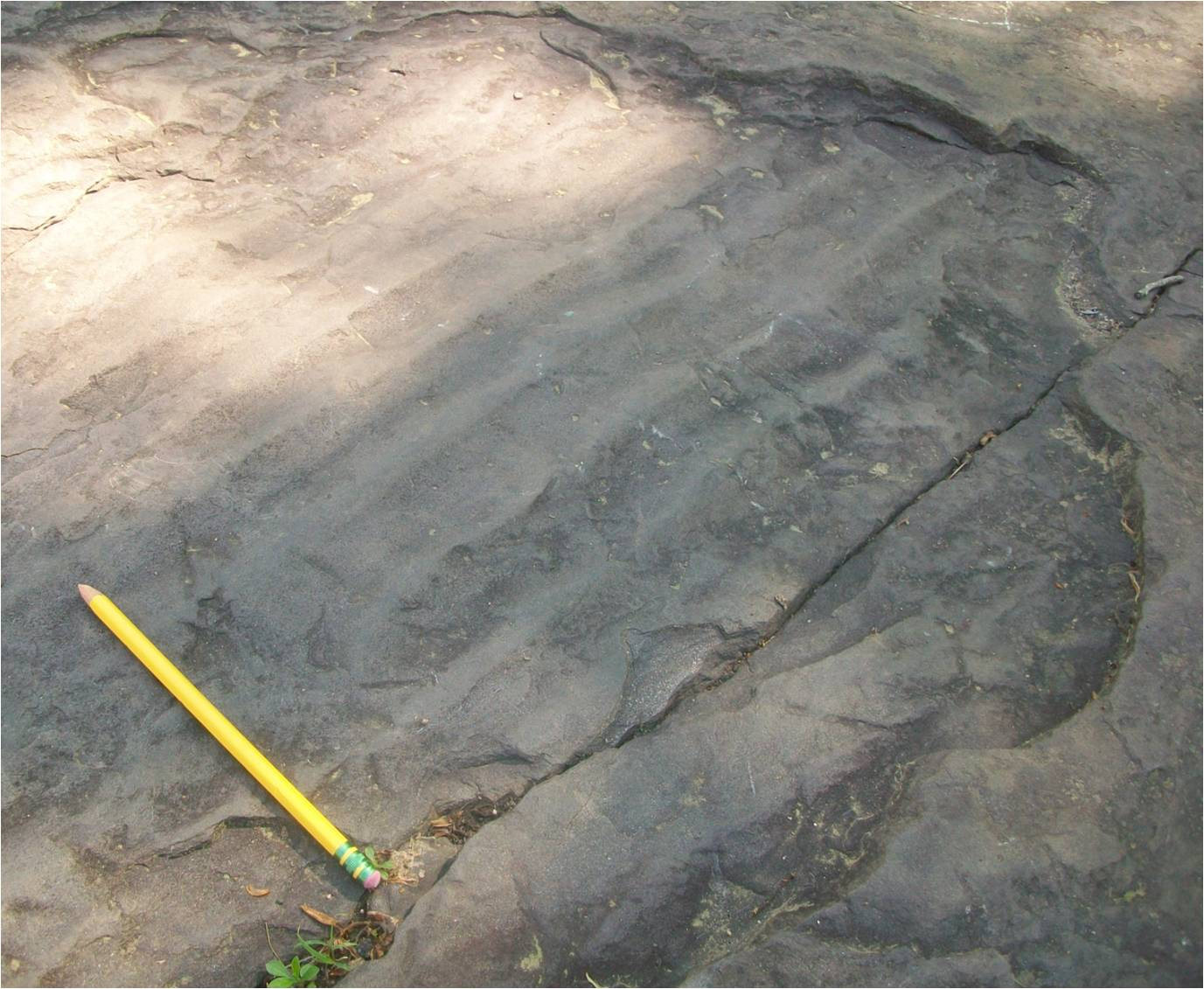
Ripple marks preserved in sandstone at Dinosaur Footprints.

A dirt path leads from the reservation entrance to the footprints. Besides the clearly formed dinosaur tracks, visitors can see imprints left by prehistoric plants, invertebrate trace fossils and delicate ripple marks of an ancient pool preserved in stone near the river's west bank. Fossils in situ are located not only in the reservation itself, but on other land including a riverfront parcel owned by Holyoke Gas and Electric and managed cooperatively with the Trustees of Reservations and the Commonwealth. There is also a place to see dinosaur tracks in nearby Granby, Massachusetts. Amherst College has a museum that displays the dinosaur footprints that were once found in South Hadley.

== Visiting ==
The reservation is open daylight hours from April 1 to November 30 and has educational programs for children. For visitor safety, Guilford Transportation, which owns the railroad corridor, does not permit crossing of railroad tracks. As such, there is no legal access to the Connecticut River. Mountain biking is not allowed. Dogs must be kept on leash at all times.

A short trail parallels Route 5 northward from the entrance to the location of the dinosaur footprints and is easily walked.

== See also ==
- Connecticut River Valley trackways
- Dinosaur State Park and Arboretum
- Gaulin Dinosaur Tracksite
- Cal Orcko
