= Climate of Massachusetts =

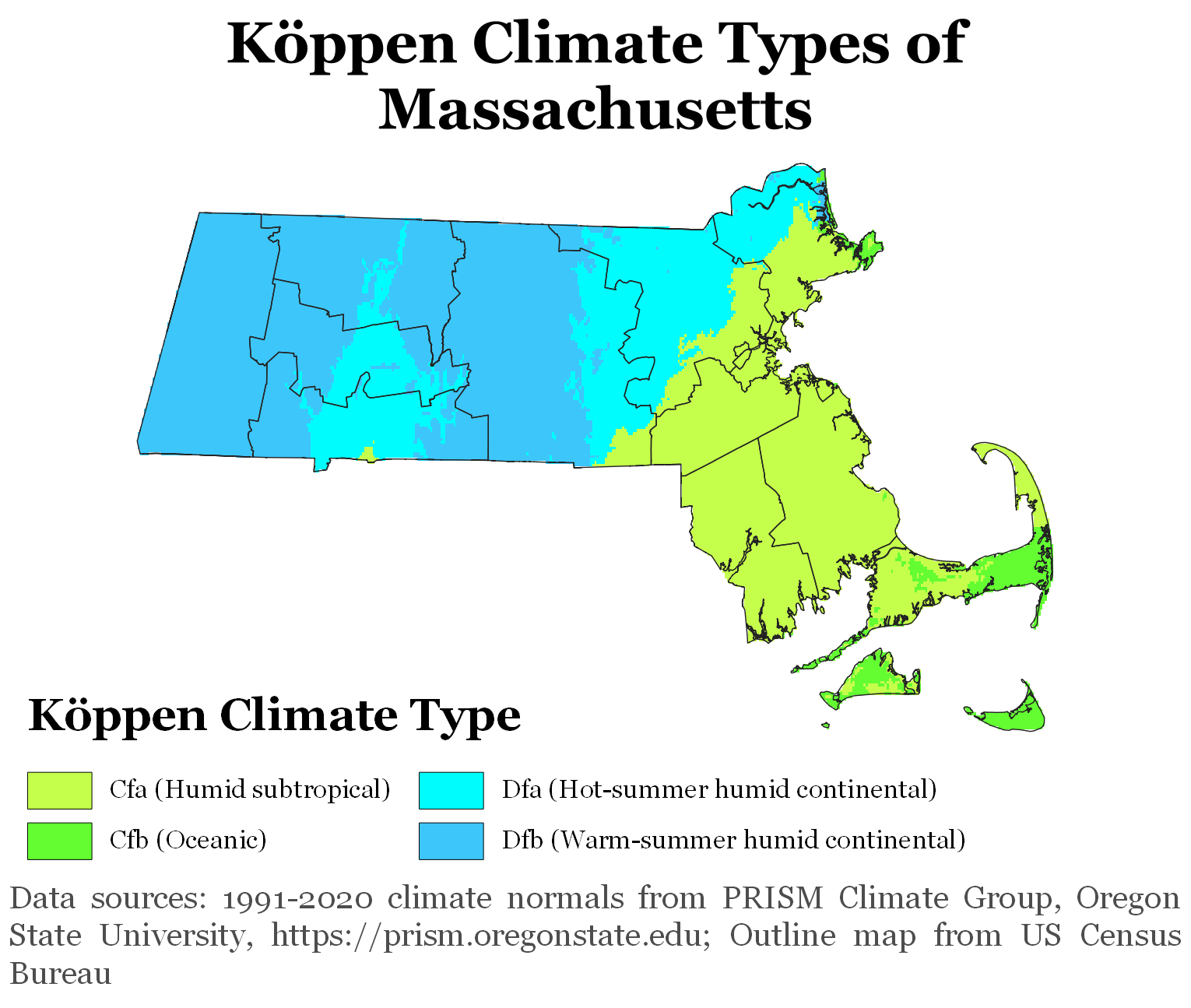
Köppen climate types of Massachusetts, using 1991-2020 climate normals

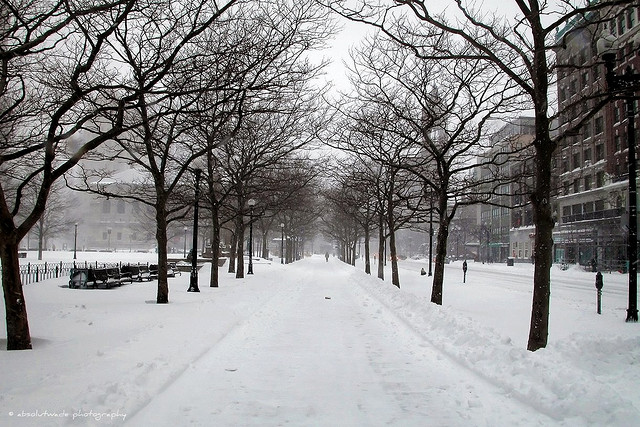
Boston after being hit by a blizzard on February 13, 2006

The climate of Massachusetts is mainly a humid continental climate, with hot, humid summers, cold, snowy winters and abundant precipitation. Massachusetts is a state located in the New England region of the northeastern United States. Most of its population of 7 million live in the Boston metropolitan area. The eastern half of this relatively small state is mostly urban and suburban. Massachusetts is the most populous of the six New England states and ranks third in the nation by population density and GDP per capita. Massachusetts receives about 43 inches or 1,090 millimetres of rain annually, fairly evenly distributed throughout the years, slightly wetter during the winter. Summers are warm with average high temperatures in July above 80 °F or 26.7 °C and overnight lows above 60 °F or 15.6 °C common throughout the state. Winters are cold, but generally less extreme on the coast with high temperatures in the winter averaging above freezing even in January, although areas further inland are much colder. The state does have extreme temperatures from time to time with 100 °F or 37.8 °C in the summer and temperatures below 0 °F or −17.8 °C in the winter not being unusual.

The state has its share of extreme weather, prone to nor'easters and to severe winter storms. Summers can bring thunderstorms, averaging around 30 days of thunderstorm activity per year. Massachusetts averages one tornado per year. Massachusetts, like the entire United States eastern seaboard, is vulnerable to hurricanes. Because its location is farther east in the Atlantic Ocean than states farther south, Massachusetts has suffered a direct hit from a major hurricane three times since 1851, the same number of direct hits suffered by the southern Atlantic state of Georgia. More often hurricanes weakened to tropical storm strength pass near Massachusetts.

With the exception of southern Connecticut, Cape Cod and the offshore islands, most of New England has a humid continental climate with hot summers and cold winters. Owing to thick deciduous forests, fall in New England brings bright and colorful foliage attracting tourists. Springs are generally wet and cloudy. Average rainfall generally ranges from 1,000 to 1,500 millimetres or 40 to 60 inches a year. Snowfall can often exceed 100 inches or 2.5 metres annually in the higher elevations.

== Climate type ==
A map of the Humid continental climate zone around the world, including Massachusetts

Western, central and interior northeastern Massachusetts’ climate is the continental climate type. This is found over large areas of land masses in the temperate regions of the mid-latitudes where there is a zone of conflict between polar and tropical air masses. The humid continental climate is marked by variable weather patterns and a large seasonal temperature variance. Places with at least four months with mean temperatures above 50 °F (10 °C), a coldest monthly temperature below 27 °F (−3 °C), and which do not meet the criteria for a semi-arid climate, are classified as continental. Beverly, Lynn, Boston, and the Interstate 95 corridor southwest of Boston begin a broad transition zone into subtropical or oceanic climates, with slightly warmer winters. The only areas in Massachusetts that are classified as an oceanic climate are Cape Ann, parts of the South Shore and South Coast, Cape Cod and the islands. These areas have a moderate influence by the North Atlantic current, which has an impact on Bermuda and the British Isles as well.

== Temperature ==
Massachusetts sees a wide variety of temperatures throughout the year, the average being as high as 95 °F (35 °C) in the summertime, and as low as -8 °F (-22 °C) in the wintertime. In the capital and largest city of Boston, the hottest month of the year is July, with an average high temperature of 81 °F or 27.2 °C and an average low temperature of 66 °F (18 °C). The coldest month of the year is January, with an average high temperature of 36 °F or 2.2 °C, and an average low temperature of 22 °F or −5.6 °C. Boston has seen 70 °F or 21.1 °C twice in recorded history during February. The highest recorded temperature for February was 73 °F or 22.8 °C on February 23, 2017. The maximum temperature recorded in March was 90 °F or 32.2 °C on March 31, 1998. Spring in Boston can be warm, with temperatures as high as the 90s when winds are offshore, though it is just as possible for a day in late May to remain in the lower 40s due to cool ocean waters. The hottest month is July, with an average high of 82 °F or 27.8 °C and average low of 66 °F or 18.9 °C, with conditions usually humid. Periods exceeding 90 °F or 32.2 °C in summer or below 10 °F or −12.2 °C in winter are not uncommon, but rarely prolonged. The record high temperature in Boston is 104 °F or 40 °C on July 4, 1911, and the record low −18 °F or −27.8 °C, recorded on February 9, 1934.

The highest temperature recorded in Massachusetts is 107 °F or 41.7 °C, recorded August 2, 1975 in New Bedford. The record low temperature in Massachusetts is −40 °F or −40 °C on January 22, 1984 in Chester.

Cooler temperatures in the summertime are seen in the coastal areas of Massachusetts. On Nantucket, the warmest month of the year is July, with an average high temperature of 76 °F or 24.4 °C and an average low temperature of 64 °F or 17.8 °C. Winters in coastal Massachusetts are nearly the same as winters on the mainland. In January, the coldest month of the year, Cape Cod has an average high temperature of 37 °F or 2.8 °C and an average low temperature of 21 °F or −6.1 °C.

Monthly Normal High and Low Temperatures For Various Massachusetts Cities (°F)
City	Jan	Feb	Mar	Apr	May	Jun	Jul	Aug	Sep	Oct	Nov	Dec
Boston	36/22	39/24	46/32	56/40	67/50	77/59	82/66	80/64	72/57	62/46	52/38	42/28
Worcester	31/16	34/18	43/26	54/36	66/46	74/55	79/61	77/60	69/51	58/41	47/32	36/22

== Extreme weather ==
=== Nor'easters ===
Nor'easters during the winter months are becoming less frequent. Nor'easters can be devastating because of two different impacts. First, the spiraling wind that hits land from the northeast, carries humid air from the ocean that can then drop as torrential rain or wet snow causing inland flooding and second, because that same northeast onshore wind can drive ocean surface water to pile up in bays and harbors causing extra high tides topped with tall and powerful waves causing coastal flooding and erosion. The storm is so named because, although the storm generally comes from the southwest, the onshore winds that cause problems in a nor'easter come from the northeast, in the coastal areas of the Northeastern United States and Atlantic Canada. More specifically, it describes a low pressure area whose center of rotation is just off the East Coast and whose leading winds in the left forward quadrant rotate onto land from the northeast. The same weather pattern, if entirely on land or entirely at sea, is not called a Nor'eastern because it does not involve the land-sea interface and don't cause the same weather problems. The precipitation pattern is similar to other extratropical storms. Nor'easters also can cause coastal flooding, coastal erosion, hurricane force winds, and heavy rain or snow. Nor'easters can occur at any time of the year but are mostly known for their presence in the winter season. Most Nor'easters start from a low-pressure system that forms in the south, most often the Gulf of Mexico, and are drawn across to the Northeast by the jet stream. The divergence or diffluence in the upper atmosphere caused by the jet stream removes and disperses the rising air at a faster rate than it is replaced at the surface, which, along with the Coriolis Effect, creates and develops a storm. Their northeast track brings them up the East Coast past the mid-Atlantic and New England coastal states. The counterclockwise flow around a low pressure system brings the warm moist oceanic air over land. The warm moist air meets cold air carried southward by the trough. The deepening low enhances the surrounding pressure gradient, which acts to spiral the very different air masses toward each other at an even faster rate. The greater the temperature differences between the two air masses, the greater the turbulence and instability, and the more severe the storm can become.

If the nor'easter takes the East Coast track, that usually indicates the presence of a high pressure area in the vicinity of Bermuda. The storm will then reach the North Carolina coast and begin to develop. At this time, the nor'easter can move slightly offshore, which would be the more destructive path, or can move slightly inland, which would present mostly rain. If it takes the offshore path, it would begin to rapidly strengthen. The effects would then start reaching the major cities of the Northeast, such as Boston. The storm, now rapidly intensifying, tracks northward. These storms sometimes intensify during their entire existence. The storm moves northward, following the topography of the East Coast. It usually reaches its peak intensity while off the Canadian coast. The storm then reaches Arctic areas, and can reach intensities equal to a strong hurricane. They then meander throughout the North Atlantic and can last for several weeks.

=== Tornadoes ===
Massachusetts is seldom hit by tornadoes, but has been part of one particularly notable event, the Flint-Worcester tornado outbreak sequence, on June 9, 1953. The massive Worcester tornado was on the ground for nearly ninety minutes. In that period it traveled 46 miles (74 km), reached 1-mile (1.6 km) in width and injured 1,300 people. At 5:08 P.M., the tornado entered Worcester and grew to an unprecedented width of one mile. Damage was extensive in Worcester (the second largest city in Massachusetts), and caused some of the worst damage of any U.S tornado on record. The hardest-hit areas included Assumption College, where a priest and two nuns were killed; the main building's 3-foot (0.91 m)-thick brick walls were reduced by three floors, and the landmark tower lost three stories. The nearby Burncoat Hill neighborhood saw heavy devastation (especially on its western slope), but it was the Uncatena-Great Brook Valley neighborhoods to the east of Burncoat Hill that were leveled, houses vanished, and debris swept clean from the sites. Forty people died in the Uncatena-Great Brook Valley areas alone. A 12-ton bus was picked up, rolled over several times and thrown against the newly constructed Curtis Apartments in Great Brook Valley, resulting in the deaths of two passengers. The Curtis Apartments blueprints were blown all the way to Duxbury, 75 miles (121 km) away. Across Boylston St. from the Curtis Apartments, the Brookside Home Farm (a city-operated dairy facility and laundry) sustained total damage, with six men killed and the loss of its herd of 80 cattle. Wrecked houses and bodies were blown into Lake Quinsigamond. The six fatalities at Brookside were the most in any particular building in the tornado. Ninety-four people were killed.

The 2011 New England tornado outbreak spawned six tornadoes which killed three people, injured over two hundred, and caused extensive property damage in central and western Massachusetts.

=== Tropical cyclones ===
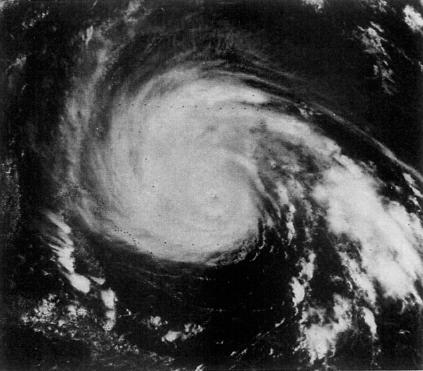
Hurricane Gloria caused 7 deaths in Massachusetts, as well as 84,000 power outages.

Massachusetts has been hit by many notable tropical cyclones. One of these was the New England Hurricane of 1938. The hurricane killed over 682 people, damaged or destroyed over 57,000 homes, and caused property losses estimated at $4.7 billion (2005 US dollars). In 1951 damaged trees and buildings were still to be seen in the affected areas. The eye of the storm followed the Connecticut River north into Massachusetts, where the winds and flooding killed 99 people. In Springfield, the river rose to 6 to 10 feet (2 to 3 m) above flood stage, causing significant damage. Up to 6 inches (152 mm) of rain fell across western Massachusetts, which combined with over 4 inches (102 mm) that had fallen a few days earlier produced widespread flooding. Residents of Ware were stranded for days, and relied on air-dropped food and medicine. After the flood receded, the town's Main Street was left a chasm in which sewer pipes could be seen. To the east, the surge left Falmouth and New Bedford under 8 feet (2.4 m) of water. Two-thirds of all the boats in New Bedford harbor sank. The Blue Hills Observatory registered sustained winds of 121 mph (195 km/h) and a peak gust of 186 mph (299 km/h).

Hurricane Gloria glancingly struck Massachusetts in 1985. On August 19, 1991, Hurricane Bob, a Category 2 hurricane, hit southeastern Massachusetts, Cape Cod and Martha's Vineyard hard, killing 18 people and injuring 190, as well as causing billions of dollars in damage.

== Climate data ==
Climate data for Massachusetts
Month	Jan	Feb	Mar	Apr	May	Jun	Jul	Aug	Sep	Oct	Nov	Dec	Year
Record high °F (°C)	74 (23)	76 (24)	92 (33)	100 (38)	101 (38)	105 (41)	106 (41)	107 (42)	103 (39)	92 (33)	85 (29)	78 (26)	107 (42)
Record low °F (°C)	−40 (−40)	−35 (−37)	−22 (−30)	2 (−17)	18 (−8)	24 (−4)	32 (0)	27 (−3)	18 (−8)	6 (−14)	−10 (−23)	−33 (−36)	−40 (−40)
Source: https://www.factmonster.com/math-science/weather/massachusetts-temperature-extremes

Climate data for Boston, Massachusetts (Logan Airport), 1991−2020 normals, (Note: Mean monthly maxima and minima (i.e. the expected highest and lowest temperature readings at any point during the year or given month) calculated based on data at said location from 1991 to 2020.) extremes 1872−present (Note: Official records for Boston were kept at downtown from January 1872 to December 1935, and at Logan Airport (KBOS) since January 1936.)
Month	Jan	Feb	Mar	Apr	May	Jun	Jul	Aug	Sep	Oct	Nov	Dec	Year
Record high °F (°C)	74 (23)	73 (23)	89 (32)	94 (34)	97 (36)	102 (39)	104 (40)	102 (39)	102 (39)	90 (32)	83 (28)	76 (24)	104 (40)
Mean maximum °F (°C)	58.3 (14.6)	57.9 (14.4)	67.0 (19.4)	79.9 (26.6)	88.1 (31.2)	92.2 (33.4)	95.0 (35.0)	93.7 (34.3)	88.9 (31.6)	79.6 (26.4)	70.2 (21.2)	61.2 (16.2)	96.4 (35.8)
Mean daily maximum °F (°C)	36.8 (2.7)	39.0 (3.9)	45.5 (7.5)	56.4 (13.6)	66.5 (19.2)	76.2 (24.6)	82.1 (27.8)	80.4 (26.9)	73.1 (22.8)	62.1 (16.7)	51.6 (10.9)	42.2 (5.7)	59.3 (15.2)
Daily mean °F (°C)	29.9 (−1.2)	31.8 (−0.1)	38.3 (3.5)	48.6 (9.2)	58.4 (14.7)	68.0 (20.0)	74.1 (23.4)	72.7 (22.6)	65.6 (18.7)	54.8 (12.7)	44.7 (7.1)	35.7 (2.1)	51.9 (11.1)
Mean daily minimum °F (°C)	23.1 (−4.9)	24.6 (−4.1)	31.1 (−0.5)	40.8 (4.9)	50.3 (10.2)	59.7 (15.4)	66.0 (18.9)	65.1 (18.4)	58.2 (14.6)	47.5 (8.6)	37.9 (3.3)	29.2 (−1.6)	44.5 (6.9)
Mean minimum °F (°C)	4.8 (−15.1)	8.3 (−13.2)	15.6 (−9.1)	31.0 (−0.6)	41.2 (5.1)	49.7 (9.8)	58.6 (14.8)	57.7 (14.3)	46.7 (8.2)	35.1 (1.7)	24.4 (−4.2)	13.1 (−10.5)	2.6 (−16.3)
Record low °F (°C)	−13 (−25)	−18 (−28)	−8 (−22)	11 (−12)	31 (−1)	41 (5)	50 (10)	46 (8)	34 (1)	25 (−4)	−2 (−19)	−17 (−27)	−18 (−28)
Average precipitation inches (mm)	3.39 (86)	3.21 (82)	4.17 (106)	3.63 (92)	3.25 (83)	3.89 (99)	3.27 (83)	3.23 (82)	3.56 (90)	4.03 (102)	3.66 (93)	4.30 (109)	43.59 (1,107)
Average snowfall inches (cm)	14.3 (36)	14.4 (37)	9.0 (23)	1.6 (4.1)	0.0 (0.0)	0.0 (0.0)	0.0 (0.0)	0.0 (0.0)	0.0 (0.0)	0.2 (0.51)	0.7 (1.8)	9.0 (23)	49.2 (125)
Average precipitation days (≥ 0.01 in)	11.8	10.6	11.6	11.6	11.8	10.9	9.4	9.0	9.0	10.5	10.3	11.9	128.4
Average snowy days (≥ 0.1 in)	6.6	6.2	4.4	0.8	0.0	0.0	0.0	0.0	0.0	0.2	0.6	4.2	23.0
Average relative humidity (%)	62.3	62.0	63.1	63.0	66.7	68.5	68.4	70.8	71.8	68.5	67.5	65.4	66.5
Average dew point °F (°C)	19.8 (−6.8)	20.3 (−6.5)	26.2 (−3.2)	35.1 (1.7)	46.2 (7.9)	56.3 (13.5)	62.1 (16.7)	61.7 (16.5)	55.9 (13.3)	45.0 (7.2)	34.5 (1.4)	25.9 (−3.4)	40.8 (4.9)
Mean monthly sunshine hours	163.4	168.4	213.7	227.2	267.3	286.5	300.9	277.3	237.1	206.3	143.2	142.3	2,633.6
Percentage possible sunshine	56	57	58	57	59	63	65	64	63	60	49	50	59
Average ultraviolet index	1	2	4	5	7	8	8	8	6	4	2	1	5
Source 1: NOAA (relative humidity, and sun 1961−1990)
Source 2: Weather Atlas (UV)

Climate data for Boston, Massachusetts
Month	Jan	Feb	Mar	Apr	May	Jun	Jul	Aug	Sep	Oct	Nov	Dec	Year
Average sea temperature °F (°C)	41.3 (5.2)	38.1 (3.4)	38.4 (3.5)	43.1 (6.2)	49.2 (9.5)	58.4 (14.7)	65.7 (18.7)	67.9 (20.0)	64.8 (18.2)	59.4 (15.3)	52.3 (11.3)	46.6 (8.2)	52.1 (11.2)
Source: Weather Atlas

Climate data for Worcester Regional Airport (elevation 1,000 feet (300 m)), 1991–2020 normals, extremes 1892–present
Month	Jan	Feb	Mar	Apr	May	Jun	Jul	Aug	Sep	Oct	Nov	Dec	Year
Record high °F (°C)	67 (19)	71 (22)	84 (29)	91 (33)	94 (34)	98 (37)	102 (39)	99 (37)	99 (37)	91 (33)	79 (26)	72 (22)	102 (39)
Mean maximum °F (°C)	55 (13)	54 (12)	64 (18)	78 (26)	85 (29)	88 (31)	90 (32)	88 (31)	84 (29)	75 (24)	66 (19)	58 (14)	91 (33)
Mean daily maximum °F (°C)	32.3 (0.2)	35.1 (1.7)	43.0 (6.1)	55.7 (13.2)	66.6 (19.2)	74.5 (23.6)	79.8 (26.6)	78.1 (25.6)	70.7 (21.5)	58.9 (14.9)	47.9 (8.8)	37.5 (3.1)	56.7 (13.7)
Daily mean °F (°C)	24.7 (−4.1)	27.0 (−2.8)	34.5 (1.4)	46.1 (7.8)	56.7 (13.7)	65.2 (18.4)	70.8 (21.6)	69.3 (20.7)	61.9 (16.6)	50.6 (10.3)	40.2 (4.6)	30.5 (−0.8)	48.1 (8.9)
Mean daily minimum °F (°C)	17.1 (−8.3)	18.9 (−7.3)	26.0 (−3.3)	36.5 (2.5)	46.8 (8.2)	55.9 (13.3)	61.7 (16.5)	60.5 (15.8)	53.2 (11.8)	42.2 (5.7)	32.5 (0.3)	23.4 (−4.8)	39.6 (4.2)
Mean minimum °F (°C)	−2 (−19)	1 (−17)	9 (−13)	25 (−4)	36 (2)	45 (7)	54 (12)	52 (11)	40 (4)	29 (−2)	18 (−8)	7 (−14)	−4 (−20)
Record low °F (°C)	−19 (−28)	−24 (−31)	−6 (−21)	9 (−13)	27 (−3)	33 (1)	41 (5)	38 (3)	27 (−3)	19 (−7)	3 (−16)	−17 (−27)	−24 (−31)
Average precipitation inches (mm)	3.52 (89)	3.26 (83)	4.19 (106)	4.08 (104)	3.56 (90)	4.22 (107)	3.93 (100)	4.14 (105)	4.24 (108)	4.84 (123)	4.00 (102)	4.28 (109)	48.26 (1,226)
Average snowfall inches (cm)	18.2 (46)	21.2 (54)	13.7 (35)	1.9 (4.8)	0.0 (0.0)	0.0 (0.0)	0.0 (0.0)	0.0 (0.0)	0.0 (0.0)	1.1 (2.8)	1.9 (4.8)	14.9 (38)	72.9 (185)
Average precipitation days (≥ 0.01 in)	12.2	10.9	12.4	12.6	13.2	11.8	11.0	10.3	9.5	11.5	10.8	12.2	138.4
Average snowy days (≥ 0.1 in)	7.5	7.6	4.9	1.2	0.0	0.0	0.0	0.0	0.0	0.3	1.0	5.6	28.1
Source: NOAA

Climate data for Nantucket, Massachusetts (Nantucket Memorial Airport) 1991–2020 normals, extremes 1948–present
Month	Jan	Feb	Mar	Apr	May	Jun	Jul	Aug	Sep	Oct	Nov	Dec	Year
Record high °F (°C)	63 (17)	59 (15)	66 (19)	83 (28)	85 (29)	92 (33)	92 (33)	100 (38)	86 (30)	83 (28)	74 (23)	63 (17)	100 (38)
Mean maximum °F (°C)	54 (12)	51 (11)	57 (14)	66 (19)	75 (24)	81 (27)	84 (29)	84 (29)	79 (26)	73 (23)	64 (18)	58 (14)	86 (30)
Mean daily maximum °F (°C)	39.5 (4.2)	40.1 (4.5)	44.2 (6.8)	52.2 (11.2)	60.7 (15.9)	68.7 (20.4)	75.4 (24.1)	75.7 (24.3)	70.4 (21.3)	61.9 (16.6)	52.8 (11.6)	45.1 (7.3)	57.2 (14.0)
Daily mean °F (°C)	33.1 (0.6)	33.5 (0.8)	37.9 (3.3)	45.5 (7.5)	53.8 (12.1)	62.2 (16.8)	69.0 (20.6)	69.0 (20.6)	63.7 (17.6)	55.2 (12.9)	46.4 (8.0)	38.6 (3.7)	50.7 (10.4)
Mean daily minimum °F (°C)	26.6 (−3.0)	27.0 (−2.8)	31.5 (−0.3)	38.8 (3.8)	47.0 (8.3)	55.7 (13.2)	62.6 (17.0)	62.4 (16.9)	57.0 (13.9)	48.6 (9.2)	40.0 (4.4)	32.2 (0.1)	44.1 (6.7)
Mean minimum °F (°C)	10 (−12)	14 (−10)	18 (−8)	28 (−2)	36 (2)	46 (8)	54 (12)	53 (12)	45 (7)	35 (2)	26 (−3)	18 (−8)	8 (−13)
Record low °F (°C)	−3 (−19)	−2 (−19)	7 (−14)	20 (−7)	28 (−2)	35 (2)	47 (8)	39 (4)	34 (1)	22 (−6)	16 (−9)	−3 (−19)	−3 (−19)
Average precipitation inches (mm)	3.18 (81)	2.84 (72)	3.84 (98)	3.60 (91)	2.98 (76)	3.00 (76)	2.72 (69)	3.00 (76)	3.59 (91)	4.39 (112)	3.79 (96)	3.93 (100)	40.86 (1,038)
Average snowfall inches (cm)	7.4 (19)	8.5 (22)	6.6 (17)	0.8 (2.0)	0.0 (0.0)	0.0 (0.0)	0.0 (0.0)	0.0 (0.0)	0.0 (0.0)	0.0 (0.0)	0.2 (0.51)	5.8 (15)	29.4 (75)
Average precipitation days (≥ 0.01 in)	11.6	10.2	10.5	11.9	11.7	11.6	11.9	13.1	12.5	13.1	10.9	12.4	141.4
Source 1: NOAA
Source 2: Western Regional Climate Center (snow 1948–present)

== See also ==
- Climate change in Massachusetts
