= Connecticut River Valley trackways =

Dinosaur tracks in Massachusetts and Connecticut

The Connecticut River Valley trackways are the fossilised footprints of a number of Early Jurassic dinosaurs or other archosauromorphs from the sandstone beds of Massachusetts and Connecticut. The finding has the distinction of being among the first known discoveries of dinosaur remains in North America.

A farm boy, Pliny Moody, came across the trackways in 1802. They were popularly regarded as bird footprints and they were so identified by the professor of natural history, later president, at Amherst College Edward Hitchcock, beginning in 1836 in articles in the American Journal of Science and in his final work Ichnology of New England (1858). Later, they were of significance to the naturalist and supporter of Darwin, Thomas Huxley. Huxley believed that birds evolved from an ancestral ratite, and the large Massachusetts tracks seemed to support this. However, when Archaeopteryx was discovered in 1861 it became apparent that the Connecticut River remains could not be those of birds and have since been reidentified as dinosaurs.

The Moody trackway is now on display at the Amherst College Beneski Museum of Natural History, along with Hitchcock's substantial collection of other specimens.

== List of identified footprints ==
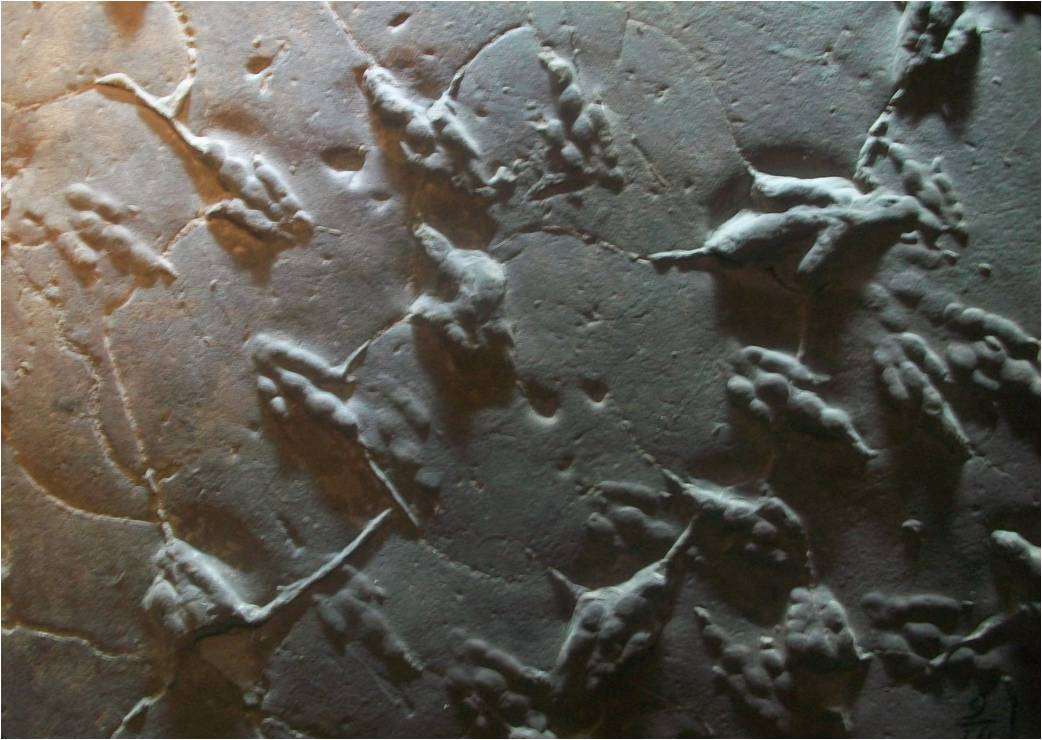
Footprints of the ichnogenus Grallator from the Connecticut River Valley on display at the Amherst Museum of Natural History

- Grallator (small theropod, similar to Podokesaurus or Coelophysis)
- Anchisauripus (medium-sized theropod, also similar to Coelophysis)
- Eubrontes (larger theropod, similar to Dilophosaurus)
- Gigandipus (another large theropod, also similar to Dilophosaurus)
- Otozoum (medium to large prosauropod, possibly a large Anchisaurus)
- Anomoepus (probably an ornithopod, similar to Scutellosaurus)
- Batrachopus (a small crocodylomorph, presumably similar to Stegomosuchus)

== See also ==
- Dinosaur Footprints nature reserve in Holyoke, Massachusetts
- Dinosaur State Park and Arboretum in Rocky Hill, Connecticut
