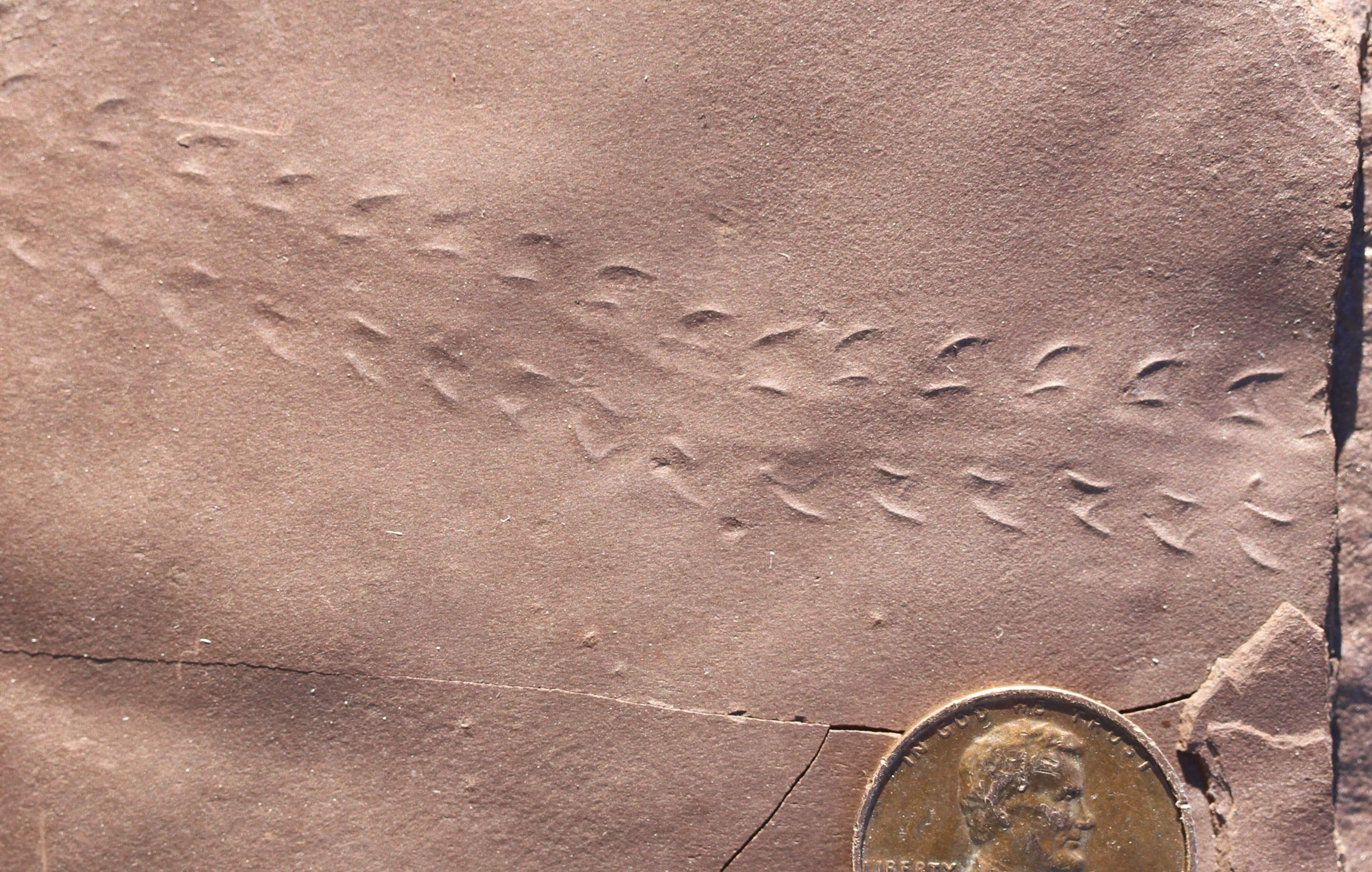
- Bifurculapes laqueatus from the Early Jurassic East Berlin Formation of Holyoke, Massachusetts, USA. Coin, for scale, is 1.905 cm wide.
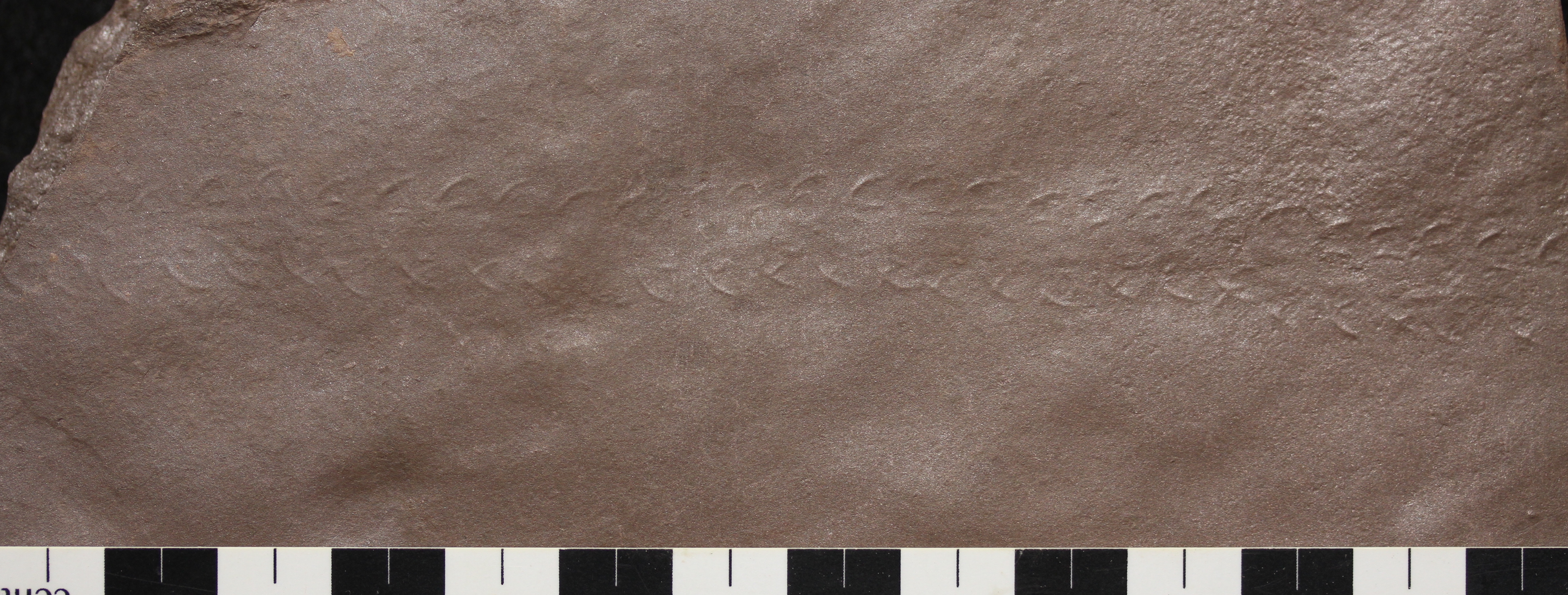
- A second specimen, from the same locality as the first. Scale is in cm.

Scientific classification
- Kingdom: Animalia
- Phylum: Arthropoda
- Clade: Pancrustacea
- Class: Insecta
- Ichnogenus: Bifurculapes; Hitchcock, 1858

= Bifurculapes =

Trace fossil

Edward Hitchcock erected the ichnogenus Bifurculapes, meaning "two little forked feet," for trace fossils that were discovered in the Early Jurassic Turners Falls Formation in the Deerfield Basin of Massachusetts. They are insect or crustacean trackways that consist of two rows of two to three tracks per series, with the two larger tracks being oriented parallel or oblique to the trackway axis. The third track, when present, is much smaller than the other two and is oriented approximately perpendicular to the trackway axis. Medial drag marks sometimes are present between the track rows. In trace fossil classification schemes based on behavior, Bifurculapes is considered a repichnion, or locomotion trace. Getty (2020) considered Bifurculapes to represent locomotion under water based on the orientation of some trackways relative to sedimentary structures called current lineations.

Hitchcock originally erected four ichnospecies, B. elachistotatus, B. laqueatus, B. scolependroideus, and B. tuberculatus, but subsequently removed B. tuberculatus while erecting B. curvatus. Since Hitchcock did not establish a type species, Lull (1953) designated B. laqueatus as the lectotype. In a recent revision of the ichnogenus, Getty (2016) recognized only two ichnospecies, B. laqueatus and B. scolependroideus; B. curvatus and B. elachistotatus were considered junior subjective synonyms of B. laqueatus, whereas B. tuberculatus was considered a nomen dubium. More recently, Getty (2018) considered the ichnogenus Camurichnus as a minor morphological variant of Bifurculapes. Outside of the Deerfield Basin, undoubted examples of Bifurculapes have been found only in the East Berlin Formation of the adjacent Hartford Basin (Getty 2016), the Lockatong Formation of Pennsylvania, and the Moenave Formation of the Zuni sag.
