= Gaulin Dinosaur Tracksite =

Ancient dinosaur tracks in Massachusetts

Coordinates: 42°11′52.29″N 72°38′40.92″W

Gaulin Dinosaur Tracksite contains assemblages of animal trace fossils including dinosaur footprints, believed to have been made during the Early Jurassic Period around 200 million years b.p., on what was then periodically a playa lake shoreline. The first tracks were discovered March 25, 1996 on private land in Holyoke, Massachusetts by landowner Gary Gaulin.

The site is part of ongoing academic research, but is located in a residential area and not open to the general public as a tourist attraction. The scientifically valuable specimens are on public display or stored for further study in the "vault" below the main viewing area at the nearby Springfield Science Museum for researchers to request a visit into.

== Geology ==
Gaulin Dinosaur Tracksite is in redstone/brownstone layers of the East Berlin Formation, running under the younger trace fossil bearing graystone Portland Formation.

== See also ==
- Dinosaur Footprints Reservation
