= Autumn in New England =

Autumn season in New England

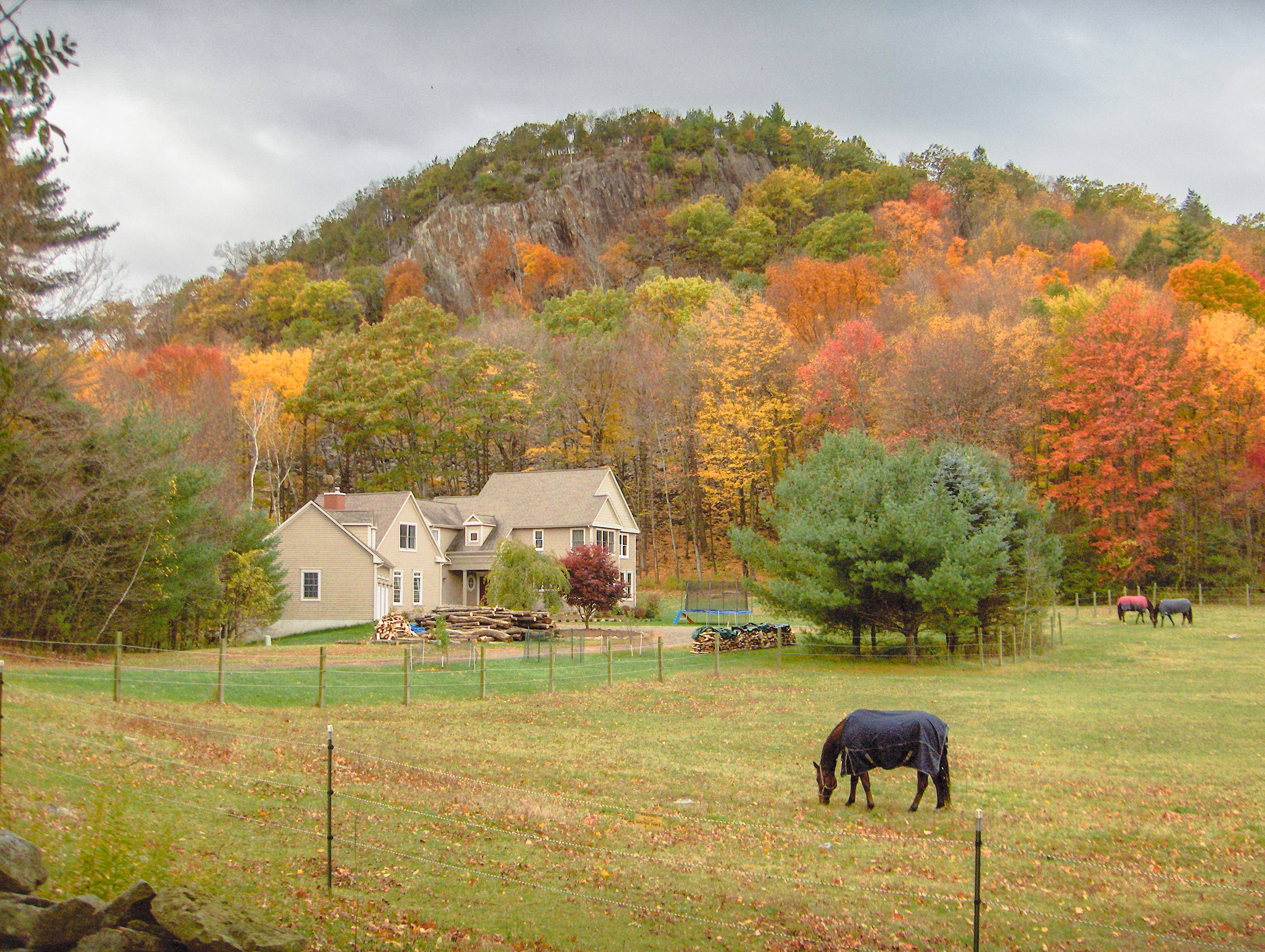
Barndoor Hills, Connecticut

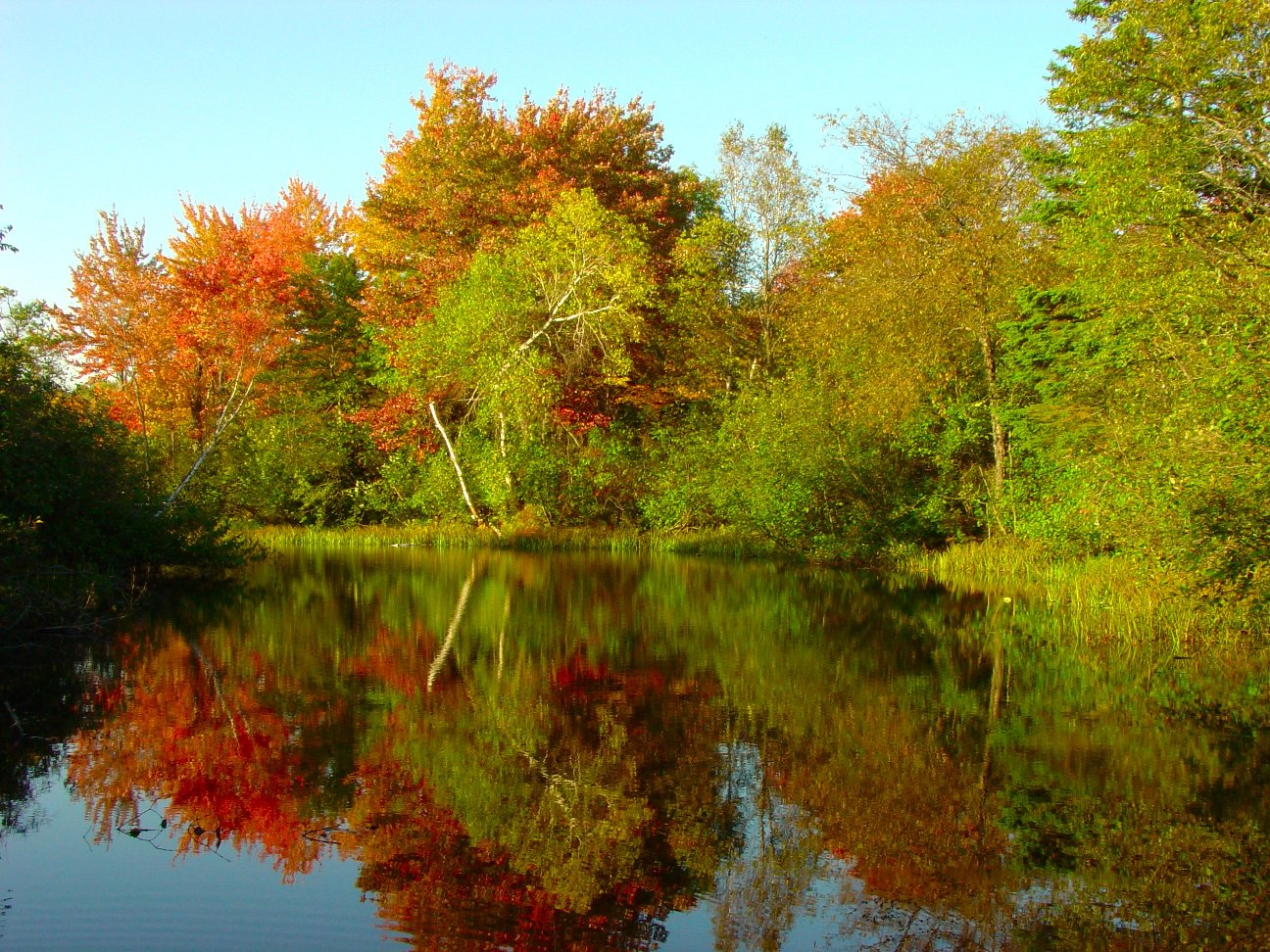
Lemon Stream, Maine

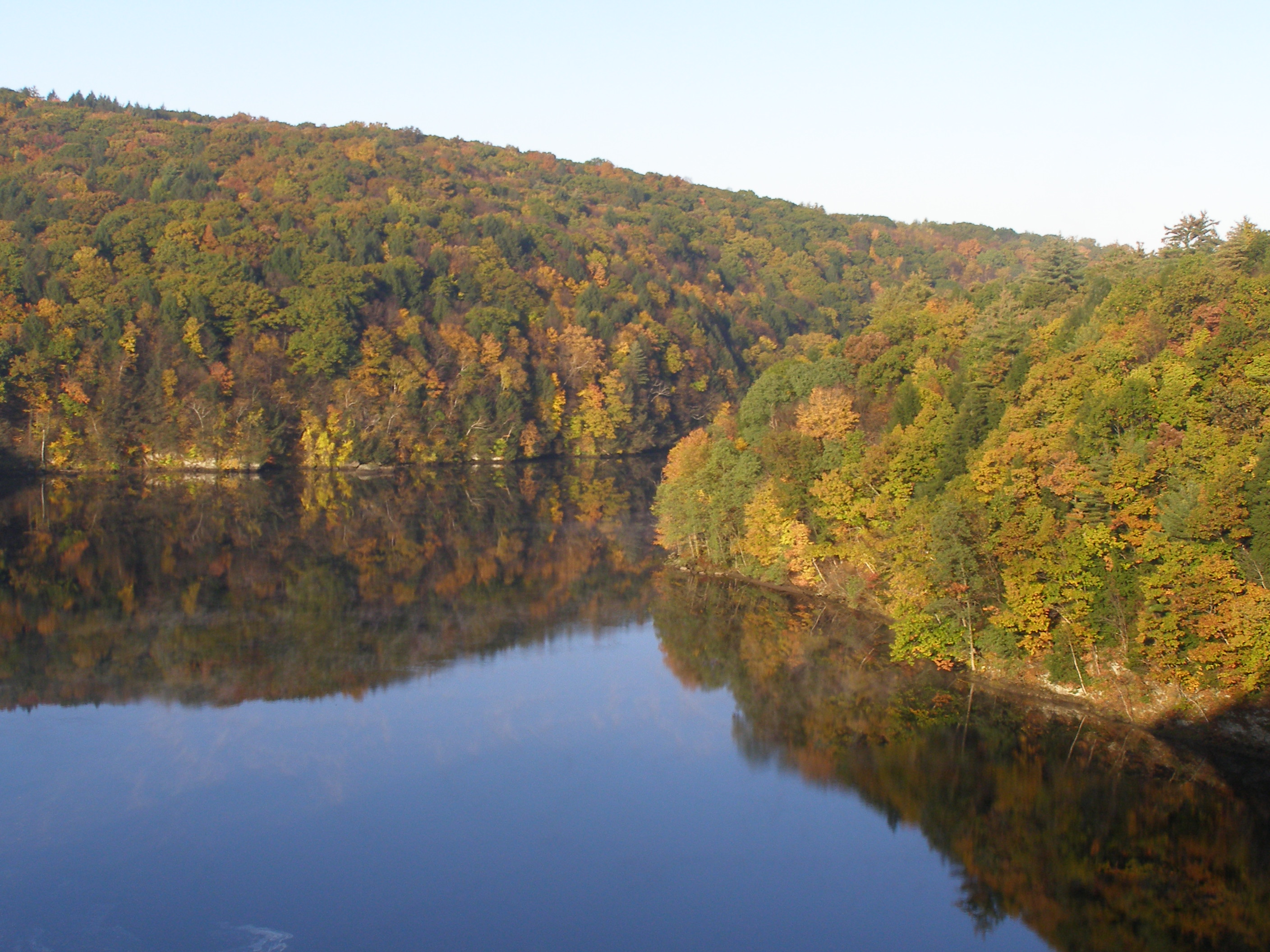
Connecticut River, Massachusetts

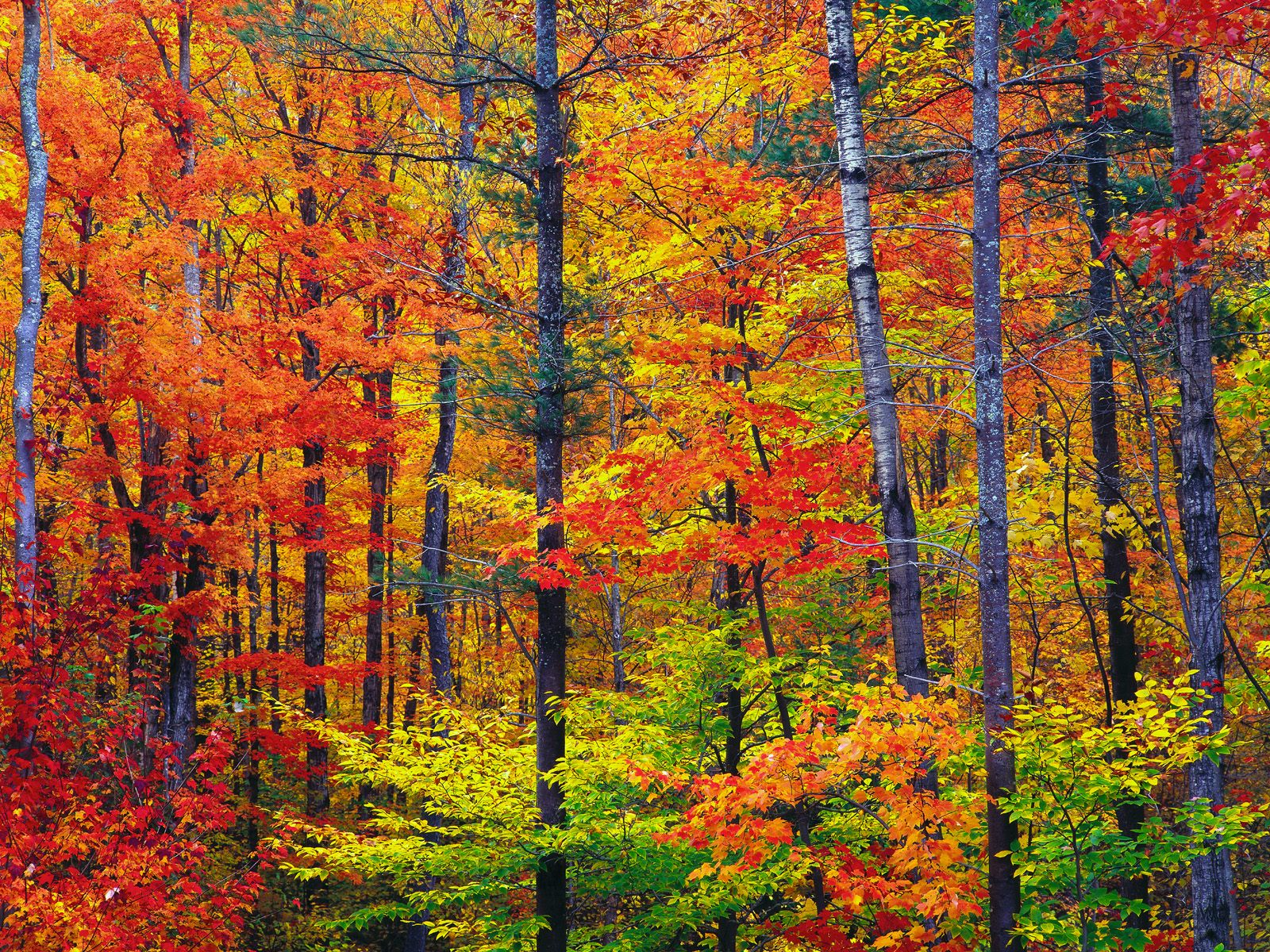
New Hampshire

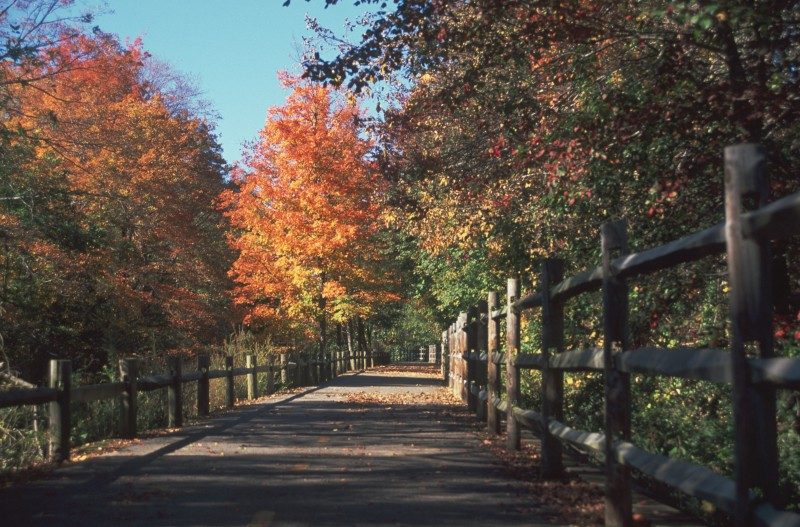
Blackstone River Bikeway, Rhode Island

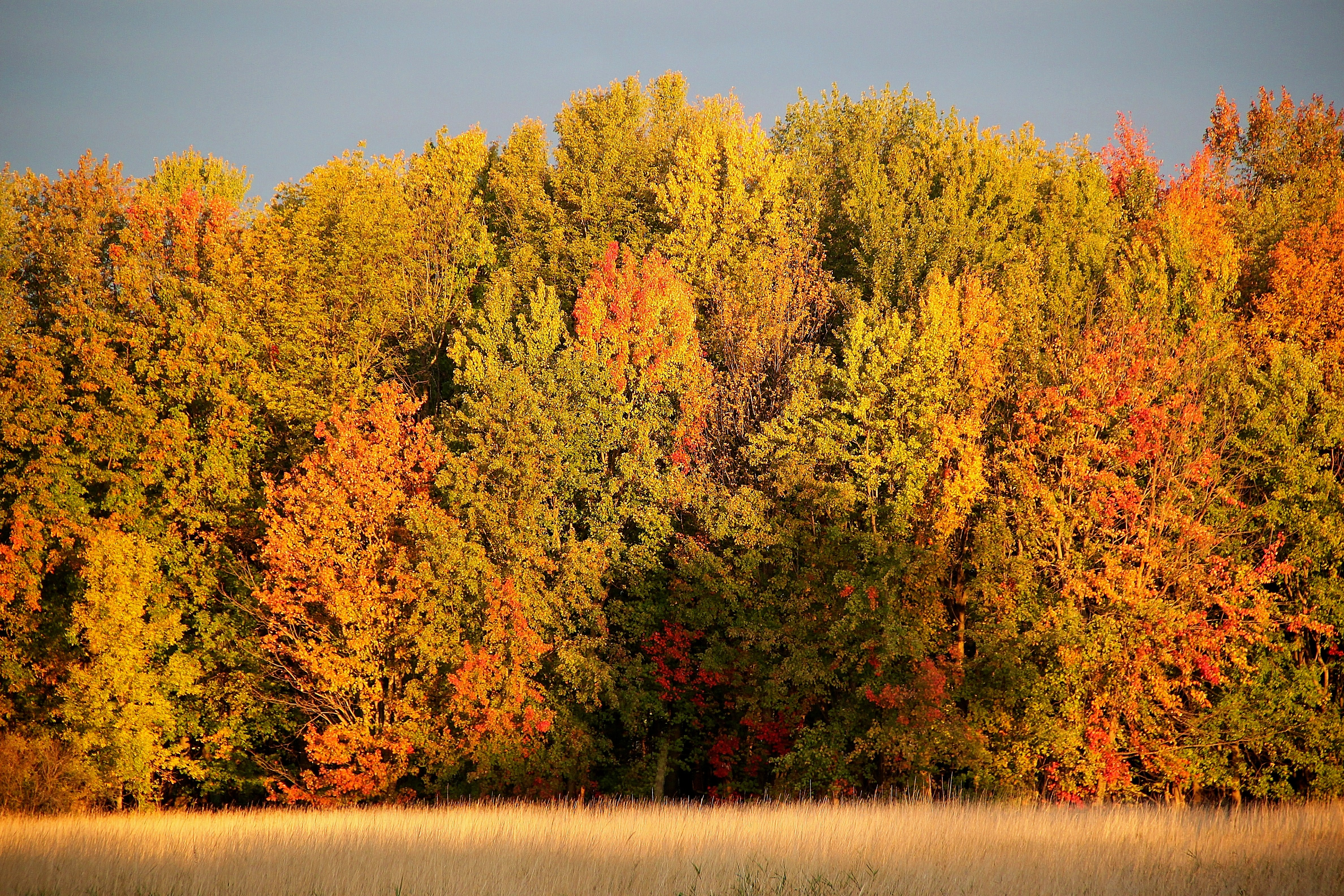
Missisquoi National Wildlife Refuge, Vermont

Autumn in New England begins in late September and ends in late December. It marks the transition from summer to winter and is known for its vibrant colors and picturesque beauty. The autumn color of the trees and flora in New England has been reported to be some of the most brilliant natural color in the United States; as such, it is a popular tourist destination, attracting visitors from across North America and overseas. Travelers flock to Vermont, New Hampshire, Maine, and parts of Massachusetts to see the colors each fall, a practice known as leaf peeping. Hiking during Autumn has become popular, and several areas offer guided tours.

The combination of natural rugged landscape and rural, small town villages have made several areas in New England iconic locations for fall color photography. The numerous barns, church buildings, farmhouses, and villages combined with the vibrant seasonal colors makes for iconic photographs. A secondary reason for popularity especially in northern New England with leaf peepers is because of the banning of billboards by Vermont and Maine, as well as the relative lack of, but not absolute absence of New Hampshire. As such, almost every back road in the region is ripe with opportunities for bucolic and idyllic rural scenes idealized with autumn foliage.

== Natural change ==
Across most of northern New England by mid-September the days are still warm, but the nights have become cool. This is the time in which deciduous trees begin the process of colorful changes in their foliage. In New England, a large percentage of trees produce a pigment known as an Anthocyanin, which results in brilliant reds and purples commonly seen around this time; a change that is particularly pronounced in the region's sugar maple trees. This gradual process in which the trees change colors starts in far Northern New England in northern Maine and the higher elevations of Vermont and New Hampshire in mid September, reaching central New England areas of southern Vermont, southern New Hampshire, and Massachusetts by early October. By mid October the color peak reaches northern Rhode Island and northern Connecticut.

From southern Connecticut southward into northern New Jersey and points south, the number of sugar maple trees declines rapidly as the climate changes to a more temperate zone and oaks become more dominant, thus there are less bright colors.

The term stick season refers to the period in late fall after the leaves have fallen and before snow has settled on the trees. The term is used often in Vermont, where the season can last for many weeks or months.

== In popular culture ==
Autumn in New England has also become a popular theme in American popular culture, with many fictional stories being set in autumntime New England.
