= Boonton Formation =

Lithostratigraphic unit

- Stratigraphic range: Late Hettangian-Sinemurian; ~197–190 Ma
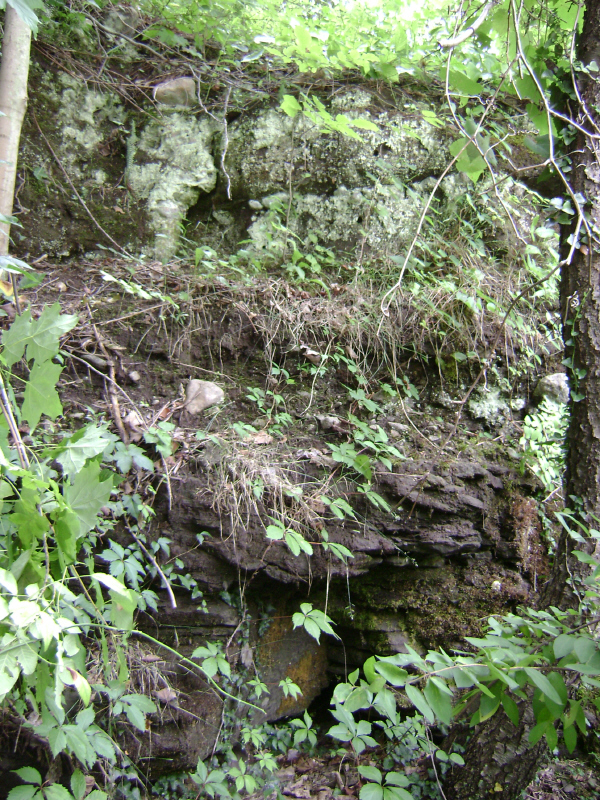
- Exposure of the Boonton Formation along a road cut in Pequannock Township, New Jersey.
- Type: Geological formation
- Unit of: Newark Supergroup; Meriden Group
- Underlies: Potomac Formation
- Overlies: Hook Mountain Basalt
- Thickness: maximum of over 1,640 feet (500 m)

Lithology
- Primary: Sandstone, siltstone, mudstone
- Other: Conglomerate, evaporite

Location
- Coordinates: 40.9°N 74.4°W
- Approximate paleocoordinates: 22.7°N 19.8°W
- Region: Newark Basin of Eastern North America Rift Basins
- Extent: continuous for ~30 miles (48 km) in New Jersey

Type section
- Named for: Boonton, New Jersey
- Named by: Paul E. Olsen
- Year defined: 1980
- Boonton Formation (the United States) Boonton Formation (New Jersey)

The Boonton Formation is a mapped bedrock unit in New Jersey, formerly divided between the Boonton and Whitehall beds of the defunct Brunswick Formation. It is named for the town of Boonton, New Jersey, which is near where its type section was described by paleontologist Paul E. Olsen.

== Description ==
The Boonton Formation is composed of reddish-brown to reddish-purple fine grained sandstone, as well as red, gray, purple, and black siltstone and mudstone. Siltstone and mudstone layers can be calcareous and feature dolomitic concretions. A well known fossil fish bed is known to exist in a carbonate rich siltstone near the top of the formation. Additionally, cross-bedded conglomerate layers interfinger with beds of the formation, usually bearing clasts of gneiss and granite.

=== Depositional environment ===
The Boonton Formation can be characterized as the uppermost continuation of the Passaic Formation, which is mostly playa and alluvial fan deposits resulting from the rifting of Pangea. However, unlike the Passaic Formation, which is primarily red in color due to arid conditions at the time of deposition, the Boonton Formation contains a much more significant portion of non-red layers, indicative of lakes present during wetter periods.

A chief difference between the Boonton Formation and all other formations of the Newark Basin is that the lower part of the formation lacks a cyclic deposition pattern. Typically, the sedimentary formations of the Newark Basin feature recurring periods of wet and dry deposition, resulting in a series of alternating red and gray-black beds. However, the lower beds of the Boonton Formation show a wide variety of color and texture arranged in no particular order.

=== Fossils ===
Fish fossils, including the ray-finned Semiontus elegans, the coelacanth Diplurus longicaudatus, and others, such as Redfieldius and Ptycholepis, can be found in the uppermost parts of the formation. In other layers, indeterminate fossil ornithischian tracks have been noted (Anomoepus is reported), along with additional reptile and dinosaur prints, such as those of Batrachopus, and the theropod Grallator. Fossil conifer remains, as well as other plant related fossils such as root structures and pollen, are also found in the formation.

== Age ==
The Boonton Formation rests conformably above the Hook Mountain Basalt, placing its deposition sometime between approximately 197 and 190 million years ago during the late Hettangian stage and Sinemurian stage of the Jurassic.

== See also ==
- Geology of New Jersey
- List of dinosaur-bearing rock formations
  - List of stratigraphic units with ornithischian tracks
    - Indeterminate ornithischian tracks
