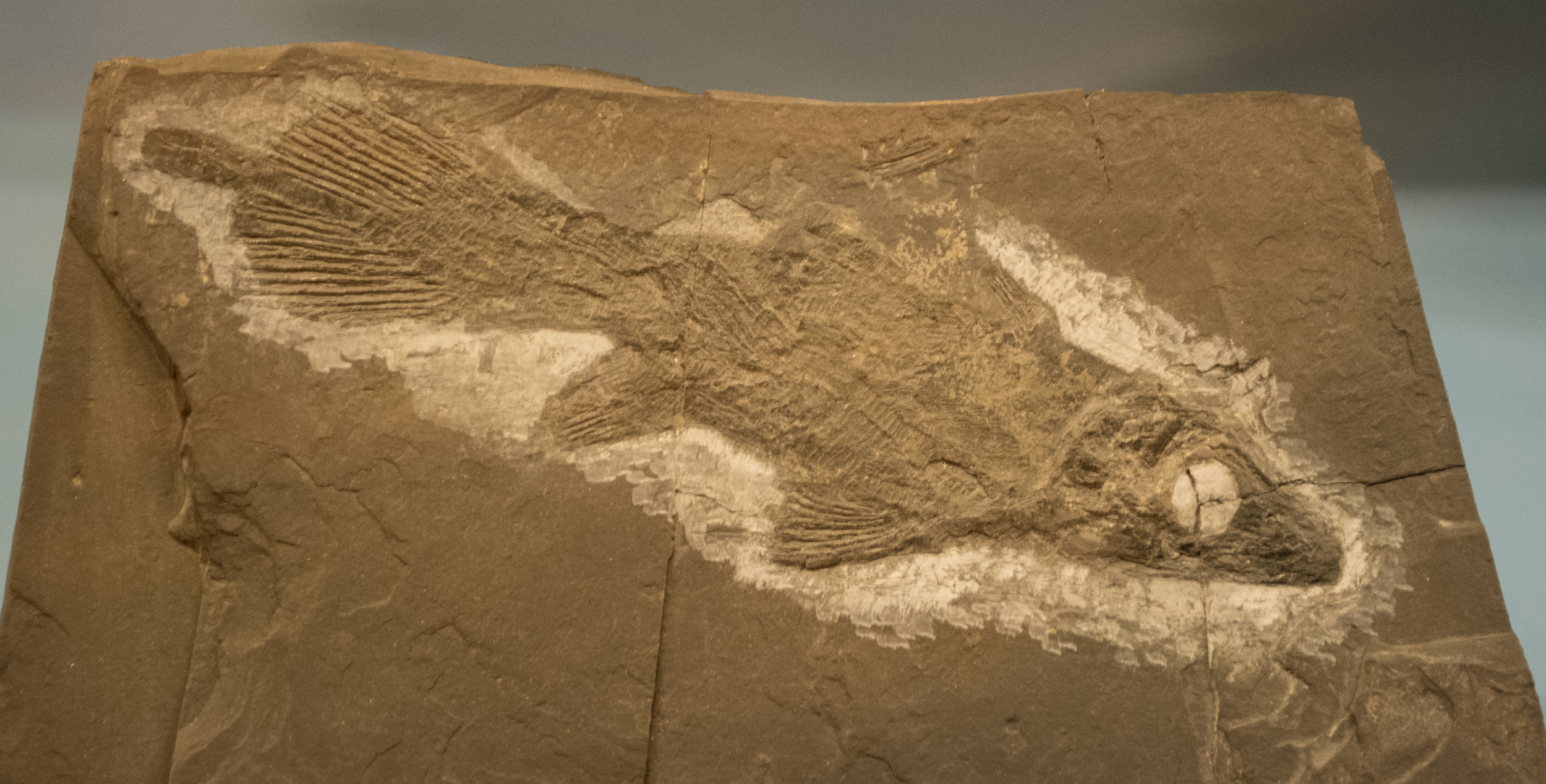
- Fossil
- Skull diagram of D. newarki

Scientific classification
- Kingdom: Animalia
- Phylum: Chordata
- Class: Actinistia
- Order: Coelacanthiformes
- Suborder: Latimerioidei
- Family: †Mawsoniidae
- Genus: †Diplurus; Newberry, 1878

Species
- †D. longicaudatus; †D. newarki; †D. uddeni; †D. enigmaticus

= Diplurus =

Diplurus Temporal range: Norian-Pliensbachian 218–186 Ma

Extinct genus of coelacanths

Diplurus is a genus of prehistoric mawsoniid coelacanth fish which lived during the Late Triassic-Early Jurassic period in North America. The fossils of this genus are common on the eastern North American Margin, being a key taxon of the Newark Supergroup, and recovered from units such as the Bull Run Formation (Norian, Virginia), Lockatong Formation (Norian, Pennsylvania), Stockton Formation (Norian, New Jersey), Solite Quarry (Norian, North Carolina-Virginia), Midland Formation (Hettangian, Virginia), East Berlin Formation (Hettangian, Connecticut), Boonton Formation (Sinemurian, New Jersey) and the Portland Formation (Hettangian-Pliensbachian, Connecticut). Three species are known, the type D. longicaudatus (Newberry, 1878), the youngest and biggest, D. newarki, (Bryant in 1934) the oldest, followed then by "D. uddeni" (Eastman), also from older rocks and considered dubious. Recent studies have recovered a 3rd or 4th species, D. enigmaticus, from the Late Triassic of New Jersey, representing another small-bodied form living in sympatry with the similarly sized D. newarki. This genus ranges in size from 15 cm of D. newarki and D. enigmaticus in New Jersey to the larger 60 cm specimens of Diplurus longicaudatus found in the Connecticut River Valley, which indicates a considerable growth and likely a change in the ecological position of the genus to a possible apex predatory niche. It may have eaten fish.

== Paleoenvironment ==
Diplurus represents a freshwater taxon that inhabited the fluvial, palustrine and lacustrine environments that filled the Valley incisions of the Newark Supergroup, mostly fed by the coeval activity of the North American CAMP. This units represented several types of freshwater settings, from rivers and wetlands to deep lakes, with a notorious diversity of fauna and flora. Late Triassic D. newarki and D. enigmaticus lived along a great invertebrate diversity, including Hyriinae, Unionidae and Corbiculidae clams, freshwater crayfishes (Cytioclopsis), ostracods (Darwinula spp.), clam-shrimps (Cyzicus spp.), insects (Belostomatidae, Coleoptera) and Notostracan crustaceans (Triops spp), then vertebrates such as the hybodont shark Carinacanthus and the bony fishes Turseodus, Synorichthys, Cionichthys, Semionotus and another coelacanth, Pariostegus. The larger Lower Jurassic D. longicaudatus shared its environment with Unionidae clams, freshwater snails (Hydrobia and Gyraulus) insects (Diptera and Coleoptera larvae, such as Mormolucoides), clam-shrimps (Cyzicus spp.) and ostracods (Darwinula spp.) invertebrates, then also with fishes such as Hybodus, Redfieldius, Ptycholepis, Acentrophorus and Semionotus. Linked with both Late Triassic and Early Jurassic, abundant terrestrial vertebrate ichnosites and body fossils are found, including those of Archosaurs and Synapsids.
