= Towaco Formation =

- Stratigraphic range: Early Jurassic
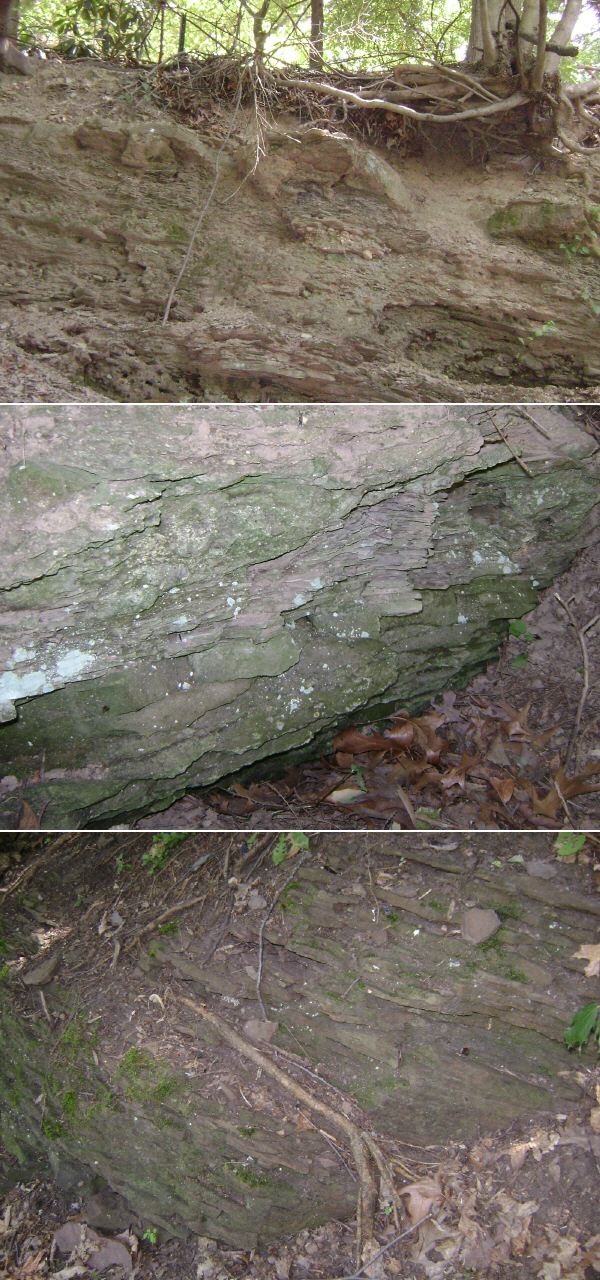
- Various colors and textures of Towaco Formation seen within Pines Lake area of Wayne, New Jersey.
- Type: Geological formation
- Unit of: Newark Supergroup
- Underlies: Hook Mountain Basalt
- Overlies: Preakness Basalt
- Thickness: maximum of at least 1,115 feet (340 m)

Lithology
- Primary: Sandstone, siltstone, mudstone
- Other: Conglomerate

Location
- Coordinates: 40.8°N 74.3°W
- Approximate paleocoordinates: 21.4°N 20.6°W
- Region: Newark Basin of Eastern North America Rift Basins
- Extent: nearly continuous for ~35 miles (56 km) in New Jersey

Type section
- Named for: Towaco, New Jersey
- Named by: Paul E. Olsen, 1980
- Towaco Formation (the United States) Towaco Formation (New Jersey)

The Towaco Formation is a mapped bedrock unit in New Jersey. It is named for the unincorporated village of Towaco, which is near the place its type section was described by paleontologist Paul E. Olsen.

== Description ==
The Towaco Formation is composed of reddish brown, reddish purple, gray, grayish-green, and white sandstone of varying grain thickness, as well as black siltstone and calcareous mudstone. Clastic/conglomerate beds are known to exist, including a 1-meter (~3 feet) thick volcaniclastic bed in the upper portion of the formation.

=== Depositional environment ===
The Towaco Formation can be characterized as a continuation of the Passaic Formation, which is mostly playa and alluvial fan deposits resulting from the rifting of Pangea. The primarily red color of this formation is often evidence that the sediments were deposited in arid conditions. However, the Towaco Formation differs from the Passaic Formation in that it contains a more significant portion of non-red layers, which were laid down by deep lakes present during wetter periods.

One of the key differences between the Towaco Formation and earlier Triassic/Jurassic sedimentary formations of the Newark Basin is that it contains much longer cyclical deposition periods. Cycles in the Towaco Formation are represented by sequences of rock ten times thicker than sequences seen in the Lockatong and Passaic formations.

Additionally, compared to the underlying Feltville Formation, the Towaco Formation contains a much more significant clastic component.

=== Fossil content ===
Fish fossils, commonly those of the ray-finned Semionotus, can be found within the formation. In other layers, indeterminate fossil ornithischian tracks have been noted, along with additional reptile and dinosaur prints. Carbonized plant remains and impressions, as well as root structures and pollen, are present. Coprolite can also be found within the formation.

== Age ==
The Towaco Formation rests conformably above the Preakness Mountain Basalt and below the Hook Mountain Basalt, placing its deposition somewhere between approximately 198 and 197 million years ago during the early Jurassic stage known as the Hettangian.

== See also ==
- Geology of New Jersey
- List of dinosaur-bearing rock formations
  - List of stratigraphic units with ornithischian tracks
    - Indeterminate ornithischian tracks
