= List of fossiliferous stratigraphic units in Connecticut =

This article contains a list of fossil-bearing stratigraphic units in the state of Connecticut, U.S.

== Sites ==
Group or Formation	Period	Notes
Agawam Group/Portland	Jurassic	
Chatham Group/New Haven	Triassic	
East Berlin Formation	Jurassic	
Meriden Group/East Berlin Formation	Jurassic	
Meriden Group/Shuttle Meadow Formation	Jurassic	
Newark Group/New Haven Formation	Triassic	
Portland Formation	Jurassic	
Shuttle Meadow Formation	Jurassic	

== See also ==
- Paleontology in Connecticut

== Bibliography ==
- Various Contributors to the Paleobiology Database. "Fossilworks: Gateway to the Paleobiology Database".
