= Feltville Formation =

- Stratigraphic range: Hettangian; ~199–196 Ma
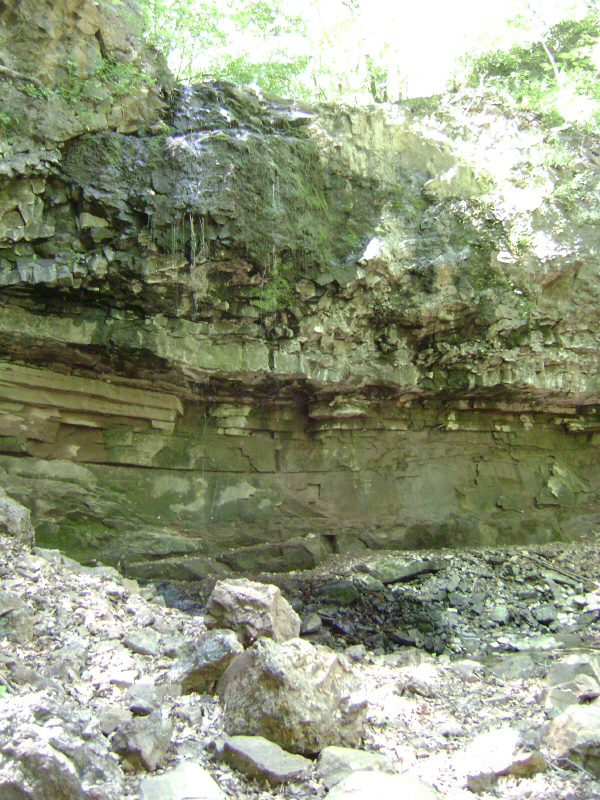
- Exposure of Feltville Formation sandstone beneath a ledge of Preakness Basalt on Preakness Mountain in New Jersey.
- Type: Geological formation
- Unit of: Newark Supergroup; Meriden Group
- Underlies: Preakness Basalt
- Overlies: Orange Mountain Basalt
- Thickness: maximum of 1,968 feet (600 m)

Lithology
- Primary: Sandstone, siltstone, mudstone
- Other: Limestone

Location
- Coordinates: 40.8°N 74.3°W
- Approximate paleocoordinates: 21.4°N 20.7°W
- Region: Newark Basin of Eastern North America Rift Basins
- Extent: continuous for ~40 miles (64 km) in New Jersey, with outliers present in New Jersey, New York & Pennsylvania

Type section
- Named for: Deserted Village of Feltville, New Jersey
- Named by: Paul E. Olsen
- Year defined: 1980
- Feltville Formation (the United States) Feltville Formation (New Jersey)

The Feltville Formation is a mapped bedrock unit primarily in New Jersey, with one known outlier in Pennsylvania and another one in New York. It is named for the Deserted Village of Feltville in Watchung Reservation, New Jersey, which is near where its type section was described by paleontologist Paul E. Olsen.

== Description ==
The Feltville Formation is composed of red, gray, and white sandstone of varying grain thickness, as well as red, gray, and black siltstone and calcareous mudstone. Sandstone/siltstone layers tend to be alternatingly massive and cross-bedded. Black to white carbonaceous limestone layers exist near the base of the formation. Additionally, pebbles and cobbles of quartz are embedded within layers of sandstone and siltstone that interfinger with the Feltville Formation near Oakland, New Jersey.

=== Depositional environment ===
The Feltville Formation can be characterized as a continuation of the Passaic Formation, which is mostly playa and alluvial fan deposits resulting from the rifting of Pangea. The primarily red color of this formation is often evidence that the sediments were deposited in arid conditions. However, the Feltville Formation differs from the Passaic Formation in that it contains a more significant portion of non-red layers, which were laid down by deep lakes present during wetter periods.

=== Fossils ===
Fish fossils, commonly those of the ray-finned Semionotus, can be found in limestone layers within the formation. In other layers, indeterminate fossil ornithischian tracks have been noted, along with additional reptile and dinosaur prints. Fossil plant remains, as well as root structures and pollen, are also found in the formation.

== Age ==
The Feltville Formation rests conformably above the Orange Mountain Basalt and below the Preakness Basalt, placing its deposition somewhere between approximately 199 and 196 million years ago during the early Jurassic stage known as the Hettangian.

== Economic geology ==
The Feltville Formation was once mined for freestone, as indicated by a historical work detailing quarrying operations at the base of Preakness Mountain in New Jersey.

== See also ==
- Geology of New Jersey
- Geology of Pennsylvania
- Lists of dinosaur-bearing stratigraphic units
  - List of stratigraphic units with ornithischian tracks
    - Indeterminate ornithischian tracks
