= Portland Formation =

Geological formation in Connecticut and Massachusetts

- Stratigraphic range: Hettangian-Sinemurian; ~199–195 Ma
- Type: Geological formation
- Unit of: Agawam Group, Newark Supergroup
- Sub-units: Turners Falls Sandstone & Mount Toby Formation
- Overlies: East Berlin Formation

Lithology
- Primary: Sandstone
- Other: Mudstone, siltstone, limestone

Location
- Coordinates: 42.3°N 72.5°W
- Approximate paleocoordinates: 24.0°N 18.6°W
- Region: Connecticut, Massachusetts
- Country: United States
- Extent: Deerfield & Hartford Basins
- Portland Formation (the United States) Portland Formation (Massachusetts)

The Portland Formation is a geological formation in Connecticut and Massachusetts in the northeastern United States. It dates back to the Early Jurassic period. The formation consists mainly of sandstone laid down by a series of lakes (in the older half of the formation) and the floodplain of a river (in the younger half). The sedimentary rock layers representing the entire Portland Formation are over 4 kilometres (2.5 mi) thick and were formed over about 4 million years of time, from the Hettangian age (lower half) to the late Hettangian and Sinemurian ages (upper half).

In 2016, the paleontologist Robert E. Weems and colleagues suggested the Portland Formation should be elevated to a geological group within the Newark Supergroup (as the Portland Group), and thereby replacing the former name "Agawam Group". They also reinstated the Longmeadow Sandstone as a formation (within the uppermost Portland Group); it had earlier been considered identical to the Portland Formation.

== Vertebrate paleofauna ==
Dinosaur coprolites are known from the formation. This formation and the underlying East Berlin Formation are well-known for its numerous well-preserved dinosaur tracks, made by trackmakers including ornithischians, theropods, and sauropodomorphs, which are preserved at sites such as Dinosaur Footprints Reservation. Other tracks are also known representing animals such as pseudosuchians, turtles, and temnospondyls.

Color key: Taxon / Reclassified taxon / Taxon falsely reported as present / Dubious taxon or junior synonym / Ichnotaxon / Ootaxon / Morphotaxon

Notes
Uncertain or tentative taxa are in small text
~~crossed out~~ taxa are discredited.

Dinosaurs
Genus	Species	Location	Stratigraphic position	Material	Notes	Images
Anomoepus	A. sp.	Massachusetts; Connecticut		Hundreds of ornithischian footprints and trackways.	Tracks made by small Ornithischians.	
Eubrontes	E. sp.	Massachusetts; Connecticut		Many theropod footprints and trackways.	Tracks made by medium to large sized theropods likely similar to Dilophosaurus.	
Grallator	G. sp.	Massachusetts; Connecticut		Many theropod footprints and trackways.	Tracks made by small to medium sized theropods likely similar to Coelophysis.	
Otozoum	O. sp	Massachusetts; Connecticut		Many sauropodomorph trackways.	Tracks made by medium sized Sauropodomorphs. Likely made by animals such as Anchisaurus.	
Anchisaurus	A. polyzelus	Connecticut; Massachusetts		Several specimens.	A relatively small basal Sauropodomorph. Many Otozoum tracks in the formation that may belong to Anchisaurus could have been made by potentially even larger specimens of the genus.	
Podokesaurus	P. holyokensis	Massachusetts		Partial postcranial skeleton.	A coelophysoid theropod. The only specimen was destroyed in a fire.	
Neotheropoda indet.	indeterminate	Massachusetts		Partial humerus.	Estimated to have been 9 meters long, and possibly a semiaquatic piscivore.	
Theropoda indet.	indeterminate	Connecticut		Two specimens and tracks attributed to "Anchisauripus"	The animal was noted as being similar to Coelophysis as well as being slightly larger than some of the largest specimens attributed to Coelophysis.	

Non-dinosaur archosaurs
Genus	Species	Location	Stratigraphic position	Material	Notes	Images
Stegomosuchus	S. longipes	Hine's Quarry, Longmeadow		Partial postcranial skeleton.	Originally Stegomus. A small armored "protosuchian" crocodyliform.	
Pterosauria indet,	indeterminate	South Hadley, Massachusetts		Partial wrist bone and tooth.	Non-pterodactyloid pterosaur estimated to have a wingspan of 40 cm.	

Fish
Genus	Species	Location	Stratigraphic position	Material	Notes	Images
Acentrophorus	A. chicopensis				Material initially referred to the genus Acentrophorus. Most researchers consider the species distinct from Acentrophorus.	
Redfieldius	R. gracilis				The last surviving redfieldiiform fish.	
Semionotus	S. sp.				A semionotid fish.	

== Invertebrate paleofauna ==
Insects
Genus	Species	Location	Stratigraphic position	Material	Notes	Images
Holcoptera	H. schlotheimi				A coptoclavid beetle known with distinct color pattern.	
Holcoptera	H. giebeli				A coptoclavid beetle known with distinct color pattern.	
Orthoptera	indeterminate					
Blattaria	indeterminate					
Polyphaga	indeterminate				An indeterminate polyphagan larvae. Similar to Mormolucoides but larger.	

== See also ==
- List of dinosaur-bearing rock formations
- Newark Supergroup
- Paleontology in Connecticut
- Paleontology in Massachusetts
