= In the Presence of Dinosaurs =

2000 book by John Colagrande and Larry Felder

- Author: John Colagrande, Larry Felder
- Language: English
- Genre: Reference encyclopedia
- Publisher: Time Life Medical
- Publication date: 2000
- Pages: 189 pp
- ISBN: 0-7370-0089-9
- OCLC: 44046896
- Dewey Decimal: 567.9 21
- LC Class: QE861.4 .C65 2000

In the Presence of Dinosaurs is book that was published in 2000 by John Colagrande and Larry Felder.

== Details ==
In the Presence of Dinosaurs focuses predominantly on the dinosaurs of North America over the course of five different time periods and details the flora, fauna, geology and geography of each time period in a manner akin to a naturalist's viewpoint. The book is divided into seven chapters, each supplemented with illustrations regarding the prominent animals and plants in each time and area.

=== Chapter 1: New World Order ===
The first chapter focuses on the rise of life in North America after the Permian Extinction during the Triassic. The rise of archosaurs as one of the predominant groups is highlighted, along with their competitors, the therapsids. Pterosaurs are shown beginning to take flight.

Animals mentioned:

- Sharovipteryx (illustrated)
- Preondactylus (illustrated)
- Garjainia (illustrated)
- Eoraptor (illustrated)
- Cynognathus (illustrated)
- Megazostrodon (illustrated)

=== Chapter 2: Veiled Woodlands ===
This second chapter focuses on the areas that became the Petrified Forest during the Triassic. Here, Phytosaurs such as Rutiodon and Rauisuchians such as Postosuchus dominated as the region's top predators and Aetosaurs and Dicynodonts played the role of the local large herbivores. Dinosaurs such as Coelophysis and Fabrosaurs also dwelt here but are considered uncommon animals in the ecosystem.

Animals mentioned:

- Rutiodon
- Chinlea (referred to as Chinlia)
- Placerias
- Calyptosuchus
- Desmatosuchus
- Postosuchus
- Hesperosuchus
- Icarosaurus
- Fabrosaurids (real genus not disclosed)
- Metoposaurus
- Eudimorphodon
- Coelophysis

=== Chapter 3: Rift Valley ===
The third chapter focuses on the Early Jurassic rift valleys and lake ecosystems. By this time, the dinosaurs now completely dominated the landscape, and their adaptations that allowed them to survive this unpredictable, drought and forest fire-prone environment are discussed.

Animals mentioned:

- Coelophysis (species unknown)
- Semionotus
- Ammosaurus
- Anchisaurus
- Dilophosaurus
- Diplurus
- Fabrosaurids
- Trithelodonts (illustrated only)

=== Chapter 4: Plains Dominion ===
Chapter 4 takes place during the Late Jurassic (Tithonian stage), and focuses on the iconic fauna of the time period, such as Apatosaurus, Allosaurus, and Stegosaurus among others. Also discussed is how the changing of the wet and dry seasons affected the wildlife and how sauropods influenced the landscape.

Animals mentioned:

- Comodactylus
- Mesadactylus
- Apatosaurus
- Brachiosaurus
- Camarasaurus
- Stegosaurus
- Camptosaurus
- Othnielia
- Ceratosaurus
- Allosaurus
- Ornitholestes
- Coelurus
- Dryolestida (referred to as pantotheres)

=== Chapter 5: Wandering Shores ===
The fifth chapter deals with the Niobrara Sea during the Campanian Stage of the Late Cretaceous. The speculative habits of animals such as Hesperornis and Pteranodon are examined, and the influence of the sea is discussed.

Animals mentioned:

- Hydrotherosaurus (illustrated only)
- Elasmosaurus
- Cretoxyrhina (illustrated only)
- Hesperornis
- Pteranodon
- Apsopelix
- Nyctosaurus
- Ichthyornis
- Archelon
- Tylosaurus
- Ammonites

=== Chapter 6: Corridor ===
Corridor discusses the biodiversity of the dinosaurs of the Campanian stage of Laramidia, the possible migrations they might have made to feed and reproduce, and how those migrations affected both local wildlife and the environment.

Animals mentioned:

- Parasaurolophus
- Corythosaurus
- Chasmosaurinae
- Centrosaurinae
- Hadrosaurus
- Tyrannosauridae (species not mentioned)
- Troodon
- Dromaeosaurus
- Ornithomimidae
- Hypsilophodontidae

=== Chapter 7: Glens of Hell Creek ===
In this last chapter, the impact of Tyrannosaurus on its environment and fellow animals is discussed and how it in turn was affected by its prey.

Animals mentioned:

- Tyrannosaurus
- Edmontosaurus
- Triceratops
- Ankylosaurus
- Ornithomimidae
- Dromaeosauridae
- Troodontidae
