= Lockatong Formation =

Stratigraphic Unit in the Northeastern United States

- Stratigraphic range: mid-Norian, 222.56–218.11 Ma
- Type: Geological formation
- Unit of: Newark Supergroup
- Sub-units: Walls Island Member (in part), Tumble Falls Member, Smith Corner Member, Prahls Island Member, Tohickon Member, Skunk Hollow Member, Byram Member, Ewing Creek Member, Nursery Member, Princeton Member, Scudders Falls Member, Wilburtha Member
- Underlies: Passaic Formation
- Overlies: Stockton Formation

Lithology
- Primary: Mudstone
- Other: Sandstone, conglomerate

Location
- Region: Pennsylvania, New Jersey, New York
- Country: United States

Type section
- Named for: Lockatong Creek

The Lockatong Formation is a Late Triassic geological formation in the Newark Basin of Pennsylvania, New Jersey, and New York. It is named after the Lockatong Creek in Hunterdon County, New Jersey.

== Description ==
The Lockatong is defined as a light to dark gray, greenish-gray, and black very fine grained sandstone, silty argillite, and laminated mudstone. In New Jersey, the cyclic nature of the formation is noted with hornfels near diabase and basalt flows.

=== Depositional environment ===
The Lockatong is often described as lake or litoral sediments. The interfingering nature of the sediments with the surrounding Stockton Formation and Passaic Formation suggests that these litoral environments shifted as climate or as the dynamic terrane of the area developed. The deposition of calcitic sediments is indicative of a climate with high evaporation rates.

More recent studies suggest that the Lockatong was a highly turbulent environment, akin to the modern Salton Sea, that was frequently subjected to high wind events that overturned the lake waters, which depleted the dissolved oxygen in the water or made the lake more toxic. These environmental shifts led to massive fish kills that accumulated on the shoreline, where they decomposed or were scavenged by phytosaurs, leading to the formation's distinctive deposits of numerous disarticulated fish parts.

== Paleobiota ==
Invertebrate burrows are the most common fossils in the Lockatong Formation.

Color key: Taxon / Reclassified taxon / Taxon falsely reported as present / Dubious taxon or junior synonym / Ichnotaxon / Ootaxon / Morphotaxon	Notes; Uncertain or tentative taxa are in small text; ~~crossed out~~ taxa are discredited.

=== Tetrapods ===
Tetrapods of the Lockatong Formation
Genus	Species	Locales known from	Material	Notes	Images
Eupelor	E. durus	Phoenixville?	Shoulder girdle elements	An dubious amphibian, potentially a metoposaurid	
Gwyneddosaurus	G. erici	Gwynedd	Partial skeleton (Gastric ejection)	A dubious reptile, likely a chimera consisting of coelacanth and Tanytrachelos fossils. Has also been considered a synonym of Tanytrachelos.	
Hypuronector	H. limnaios	Granton Quarry (Ewing Creek Member?), Weehawken Quarry (Nursery Member), Edgewater Quarry	Several partial skeletons	A drepanosaur, originally known as "the deep-tailed swimmer".	
Icarosaurus	I. siefkeri	Granton Quarry (Ewing Creek Member?)	A partial skeleton	A kuehneosaurid.	
Rhabdopelix	R. longispinis	Gwynedd	Isolated vertebrae and other remains, now lost	A dubious reptile, likely a chimera consisting of Tanytrachelos, Icarosaurus, and/or fish fossils.	
Rutiodon	R. carolinensis	Granton Quarry, Princeton, Phoenixville	Skull, teeth, other fragments	A phytosaur.	
Tanytrachelos	T. ahynis	Granton Quarry, Haines & Kibblehouse Quarry (Skunk Hollow-Tohickon Members), Weehawken Quarry, other Palisades area outcrops.	A large number of partial skeletons	A small and fairly common tanystropheid.	

=== Fish ===
Fish of the Lockatong Formation
Genus	Species	Locales known from	Material	Notes	Images
Carinacanthus	C. jepseni	Gwynedd	A partial skeleton	A very rare hybodont shark	
Cionichthys	C. sp.	Gwynedd, Weehawken Quarry	Partial skeletons	A rare redfieldiid, originally called Redfieldius obrai.	
Diplurus	D. longicaudatus	Granton Quarry, Gwynedd, Princeton	A partial skull and scales	A rare coelacanth	
Diplurus	D. newarki	Granton Quarry, Gwynedd, Princeton, Weehawken Quarry and other Palisades area outcrops, Arcola.	Numerous skeletons	An abundant coelacanth, sometimes given its own genus (Osteopleurus). Includes "Osteopleurus milleri", from Granton Quarry, which is indistinguishable apart from its larger size.	
Lysorocephalus	L. gwynnedensis	Gwynedd	A partial skull	A dubious fish likely synonymous with Turseodus. Originally misidentified as a lysorophian amphibian.	
Pariostegus?	P. sp.	Arcola, Granton Quarry	Isolated fossils	A rare but very large coelacanth which may be synonymous with Diplurus.	
Rabdiolepis	R. gwyneddensis	Gwynedd	A partial skeleton	A dubious coelacanth, likely synonymous with Diplurus or Pariostegus.	
Semionotus	"S. brauni group"	Weehawken Quarry and other Palisades area outcrops, Arcola.	Numerous skeletons	A locally common semionotiform. Likely encompasses two species.	
Synorichthys	S. cf. S. stewarti	Granton Quarry, Weehawken Quarry, Arcola.	Numerous skeletons	A locally common redfieldiid.	
Turseodus	T. acutus	Granton Quarry, Princeton, Phoenixville, Weehawken Quarry and other Palisades area outcrops, Arcola, Gwynedd, Miller's Quarry., Haines & Kibblehouse Quarry.	Numerous skeletons	An abundant palaeonisciform which may include multiple species.	

=== Ichnofossils ===
Ichnofossils of the Lockatong Formation
Ichnogenus	Ichnospecies	Locales known from	Notes
Anchisauripus	A. gwyneddensis	Gwynedd	Possible junior synonym of Atreipus milfordensis
Apatopus	A. lineatus	Schuylkill outcrops	Phytosaur tracks
Atreipus	A. milfordensis	Souderton (Tumble Falls Member), Gwynedd, Arcola, Schuylkill outcrops?	Tracks from quadrupedal ornithischian dinosaurs or silesaurid dinosauromorphs.
Brachychirotherium	B. parvum	Arcola, Schuylkill outcrops	Aetosaur tracks? May include B. eyermani, a junior synonym.
Grallator	G. sp.		Theropod dinosaur tracks.
Gwyneddichnium	G. majore	Gwynedd, Souderton, numerous other localities.	Tracks from small tanystropheids such as Tanytrachelos.
Gwyneddichnium	G. minore	Gwynedd	Nomen dubium: indeterminate or synonymous with G. majore.
Gwyneddichnium	G. elongatum	Gwynedd	Nomen dubium: indeterminate or synonymous with G. majore.
Platypterna	P. lockatong	Gwynedd	Dubious ornithischian tracks.
Rhynchosauroides	R. brunswickii	Arcola? Gwynedd?	Originally known as Kintneria brunswickii. Sphenodontian or lizard tracks.
Rhynchosauroides	R. hyperbates	Arcola, Schuylkill outcrops.	Sphenodontian or lizard tracks.
Rhynchosauroides	R. sp.	Souderton, Phoenixville.	Indeterminate Rhynchosauroides specimens.

== Geological facies ==
=== Laminated mudstone ===
Grey to black laminated mudstone (shale) was deposited in long-lasting perennial lakes. Some of the laminae are graded due to their sediment settling out after a turbidity flow. Others have a lenticular or "pinch-and-swell" shape (with alternating narrow and elliptical cross-sections), which results from the motion of waves at the water surface. Small burrows and minor sediment deformation are also known to occur. However, these shales and their layers become finer, flatter, and less disturbed as the lakes deepen. They also lose oxygen and acquire higher concentrations of dark organic material and carbonate.

The finest shales formed in the deepest parts of the largest lakes. Their layers are very thin and consist of perfectly even, continuous bands of organic material alternating with carbonate (limestone) or clay. Sometimes these shales can be up to 8% organic material by weight. The different layers may be due to seasonal variation in sediment deposition, chemical conditions, and/or algal growth. A complete lack of influence from waves or bioturbating animals indicates that the lakes were very deep and anoxic at their lowest extents. Fossils such as well-preserved fish skeletons are common in the absence of decomposing organisms. The minimum depth necessary to maintain this environment has been estimated to range from 60 meters to up to 80 or 100 meters.

=== Thin-bedded mudstone ===
Red to grey thin-bedded mudstones are lake or lakeshore sediments intermediate in layer width between shale and massive mudstone. Graded and "pinch-and-swell" layers are common in these facies. This indicates that these shallower sediments experienced disturbances like floods or increased wave action during storms. Other thin-bedded mudstone is so heavily bioturbated by burrows that it has a "shredded" appearance, where it is difficult to distinguish the individual layers. The higher-energy shallow water environment means that the sediments which make up thin-bedded mudstone are coarser than those of shale. Most of the shallow mudstone layers are interbedded with siltstone and/or sandstone. In some cases, cross-bedding, ripple marks, or other sedimentary structures can be observed in coarse layers. Though small and rare, stromatolite structures made of micrite are known to occur around some lakeshore sediments.

Thin-bedded mudstones with deep mudcracks develop in environments where the lake mud is frequently exposed to dry air. These mudcracks can be simple crevices or more complex multi-branched structures. After a flood, the mudcracks are refilled with mud or other sediments. In some areas tiny circular or elliptical vesicles (air bubbles) are preserved within the refilled mudcracks. Vesicles most commonly form in narrow layers of drying fresh mud deposited on top of older, tougher mud-cracked lake sediments. The mud layers which contain vesicles often have a scalloped appearance where their edges peel upwards above the mudcracks.

=== Massive mudstone ===
Red to grey massive mudstone has no discernable layers. Almost all massive mudstone develops mudcracks, indicating dry conditions above water most of the time. Brecciated massive mudstone is heavily cracked in multiple directions. It has been described as a "breccia fabric": a patchwork of angular mud fragments held together by a carbonate or silicate matrix. This type of mudstone formed on dry lakes (playas) which constantly redeveloped mudcracks as they were hydrated and dried out multiple times. Vesicles can occur in breccia fabric which dried quickly enough to trap air bubbles without collapsing. Vesicular massive mudstone is more chaotic in structure, dominated by numerous vesicles and thin, jagged cracks. The playas responsible for vesicular massive mudstone were much drier than their brecciated equivalent.

Peloidal or efflorescent massive mudstone is similar to brecciated massive mudstone, but its mud fragments are small, rounded clumps. This clumping pattern resembles that of modern salty playas, where dissolved salt gives the lakebed mud a crumbly powdered texture. Traces of mudcracks are still present, but have been heavily deformed by the textural changes. The wettest type of massive mudstone is burrowed massive mudstone, which is thin-bedded mudstone that has been completely homogenized by bioturbation.

=== Crystal structures ===
Saline minerals (typically calcite) are common in the mudstones of the Lockatong Formation. Calcite crystals may be present in the form of hexagonal pseudomorphs. The original hexagonal crystal (now replaced by calcite) was probably pirssonite or a similar mineral, which settled on the lakebed after crystallizing near the water surface. In laminated mudstone, some laminae may consist entirely of sheets of hexagonal calcite crystals. They act similar to sand grains and can occur in graded, "pinch-and-swell", and continuous laminae of lake mudstone.

Crystal clasts are a different kind of crystal structure occurring in the Lockatong Formation. They involve blade-like cavities (perhaps originally from sodium carbonate) which have been filled with crystals of various other minerals. Calcite, analcime, albite, dolomite, and potassium feldspar are all known to occur within Lockatong crystal clasts. Although gypsum is abundant in the crystal clasts of the overlying Passaic Formation, it is absent in the Lockatong Formation. Some crystal clasts grow perpendicular to the layers, often sending out multiple branches as they radiate from a bedding plane. These radiating crystal clasts typically form in transgressing shallow lake mudstones, as saline waters penetrate the lakebed and promote crystal growth.

Most crystal clasts are more random in orientation and distribution. Random crystal clasts are typically graded, growing larger and more euhedral the deeper they occur within a given layer. They most commonly occur in peloidal massive mudstone, as brine sinks into a saline mudflat and crystallizes. Periodic rains dissolve crystals closer to the surface, explaining why crystals higher in a sequence are smaller and more irregular in shape.

=== Sandstone and conglomerate facies ===
While most Lockatong sediments are mudstones associated with lakes or lakebeds, river or stream deposits can also occur. These deposits form in areas equivalent to the edge of the Newark basin, and typically consist of sandstone and conglomerate. Since the Lockatong Formation is primarily exposed in the center of the Newark basin, basin-margin facies are rare. The overlying Passaic Formation has more extensive exposures near the basin margin, and thus a higher prevalence of sandstone and conglomerate.

Thin beds of rippling sandstone are termed wave-dominated sandstone. This type of sandstone formed in the sandy shallows of lakes with low-angled lakebeds. Their characteristic wavy layering represents ripple marks formed during storms and other disruptive events. Slightly thicker sandstone foreset beds (preserved sandbars) are often associated with wave-dominated sandstone. Sandstone beds overlying mudstone become coarser the further up one goes in the sequence. Mudcrack-like structures can also develop when the sand is exposed to the air.

Some rivers flowing into the basin create deltas along the edges of lakes. Lockatong deltas produced sandstone beds with climbing ripple cross-bedding, a specialized sedimentary structure indicative of decelerating water. Some deltaic sandstone bedding is similar to the foreset beds of wave-dominated sandstone. However, the layers are more bowl-shaped and clinoform (i.e. stacked at much steeper angles). Upward-coarsening trends are still abundant, and root casts are sometimes found as well. Clinoform deltaic sandstone formed in Gilbert deltas, which involve coarse riverbed sediments abruptly being deposited onto a lakebed. Extensive stacks of this sandstone type indicate rising and falling lake water levels, inducing the deltas to shift and overlap older sediments. Sheet-like deltaic sandstones also have climbing ripples, but their layers are at a much lower angle than clinoform deltaic sandstone. They are often interbedded with mudcracked mudstone, typically vesicle-rich thin-bedded mudstone. The deltas which form these kinds of sandstone were low-relief temporary deltas that manifested during sheet flood events. Both the sheet deltas and the ephemeral lakes supplied by them would have dried up shortly afterwards. Deformation is common within the sheet delta sandstone layers due to repeated sheet floods through time.

Close to the Ramapo Fault (which forms the northern border of the Newark basin), conglomerate becomes the dominant form of sediment. Border fault conglomerate is locally common but can only be found in a small portion of the basin's area. The rocks making up the clasts of Newark conglomerate include dolomite, limestone, gneiss, granite, quartzite, and older Devonian conglomerate from the surrounding mountains. At their maximum size, conglomerate clasts are boulders up to half a meter across, but most clasts are much smaller. Large pebbles and cobbles are typically supported in distinct sandstone lenses with convex upper margins and flat lower margins. The largest clasts are found near the upper margin of the lenses. These facies are termed matrix-supported conglomerate, corresponding to debris flows on an alluvial fan. Some conglomerate involves bands of smaller pebbles interbedded with laminated sandstone in lenses with flat upper margins and concave lower margins. This type of conglomerate is known as clast-supported conglomerate, which was deposited in ephemeral stream channels on an alluvial fan. Away from the fault, sandstone becomes more common and conglomerate becomes more rare, indicating that the alluvial fans flatten into dry sandy plains. Root casts and burrows are abundant in deposits corresponding to the lower portions of an alluvial fan, where porous sediments and a high water table occur simultaneously.

The southwest and northeast corners of the Newark basin have another type of sandstone and conglomerate facies: axial facies. The most visible layers in these areas are graded conglomerate beds with large-scale and easily visible cross-bedding. Between the conglomerate layers lie sequences of interbedded mudstone and sandstone, with sandstone beds becoming thicker the higher one goes in a sequence. Unlike the cross-bedded conglomerate, the mudstone and sandstone layers have rare or absent sedimentary structures. Instead, they are heavily bioturbated by burrows and roots. Axial facies are riverbed and overbank deposits from braided rivers flowing down to supply the basin with water and sediment. The southwestern river system which flowed into the Newark basin is likely the same as that which formed the Hammer Creek Formation further west.

== Age ==
Relative age dating of the Lockatong places it in the Upper Triassic. It rests unconformably below many different formations of the Atlantic Coastal Plain. It interfingers with both the Stockton Formation and Passaic Formation. There are numerous diabase intrusions and basalt into the Stockton with local contact metamorphic rocks.

Starting in the 1990s, the depositional history of the Newark Basin was recalibrated through a combination of core drilling, radiometric dating, cyclostratigraphy, and magnetostratigraphy. The result was the Newark astrochronostratigraphic polarity time scale (APTS), a unifying system which provides precise ages for sediment layers within the basin. Based on the Newark APTS, the Lockatong Formation was assigned a mid-Norian age (222.56 – 218.11 Ma).

== See also ==
- Geology of Pennsylvania
- Geology of New Jersey
