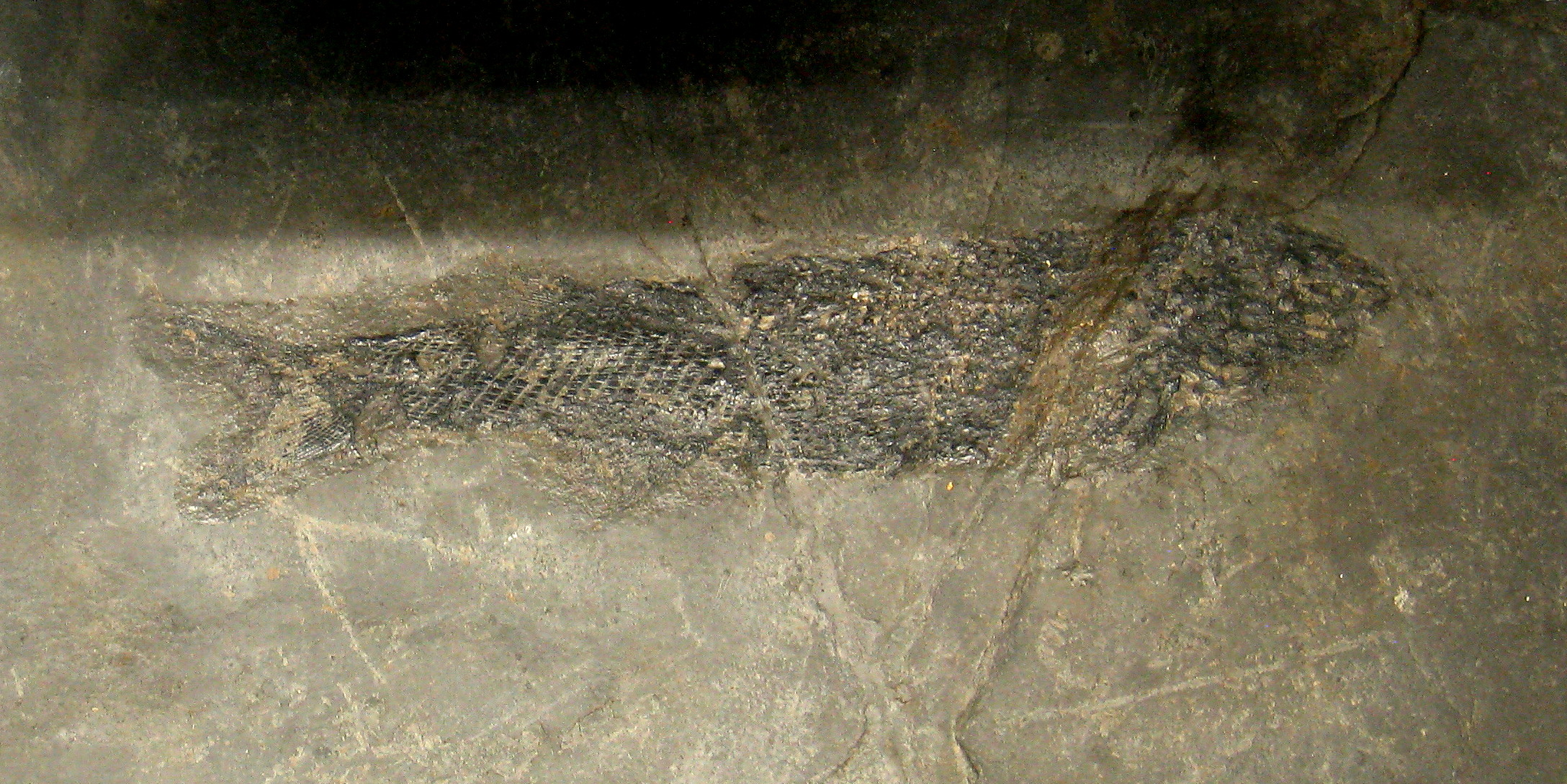
- Fossil specimen at the UMMNH

Scientific classification
- Domain: Eukaryota
- Kingdom: Animalia
- Phylum: Chordata
- Class: Actinopterygii
- Order: †Redfieldiiformes
- Family: †Redfieldiidae
- Genus: †Redfieldius; Hay, 1899
- Species: †R. gracilis

Binomial name
- †Redfieldius gracilis (Redfield, 1837)

Synonyms
- †Catopterus Redfield, 1837

= Redfieldius =

Redfieldius Temporal range: Early Jurassic, Hettangian-Sinemurian

Extinct genus of fishes

Redfieldius is an extinct genus of freshwater ray-finned fish that inhabited eastern North America during the Early Jurassic period. It contains a single species, R. gracilis, known from the Hettangian to the Sinemurian of the northeastern United States. It is the type genus and was the last surviving member of the order Redfieldiiformes, which was widespread and diverse throughout the preceding Triassic period. It is notable for representing possibly the first fossil bony fish collected from North America, with a specimen from Middletown collected in 1816 by Benjamin Silliman.

== Taxonomy ==
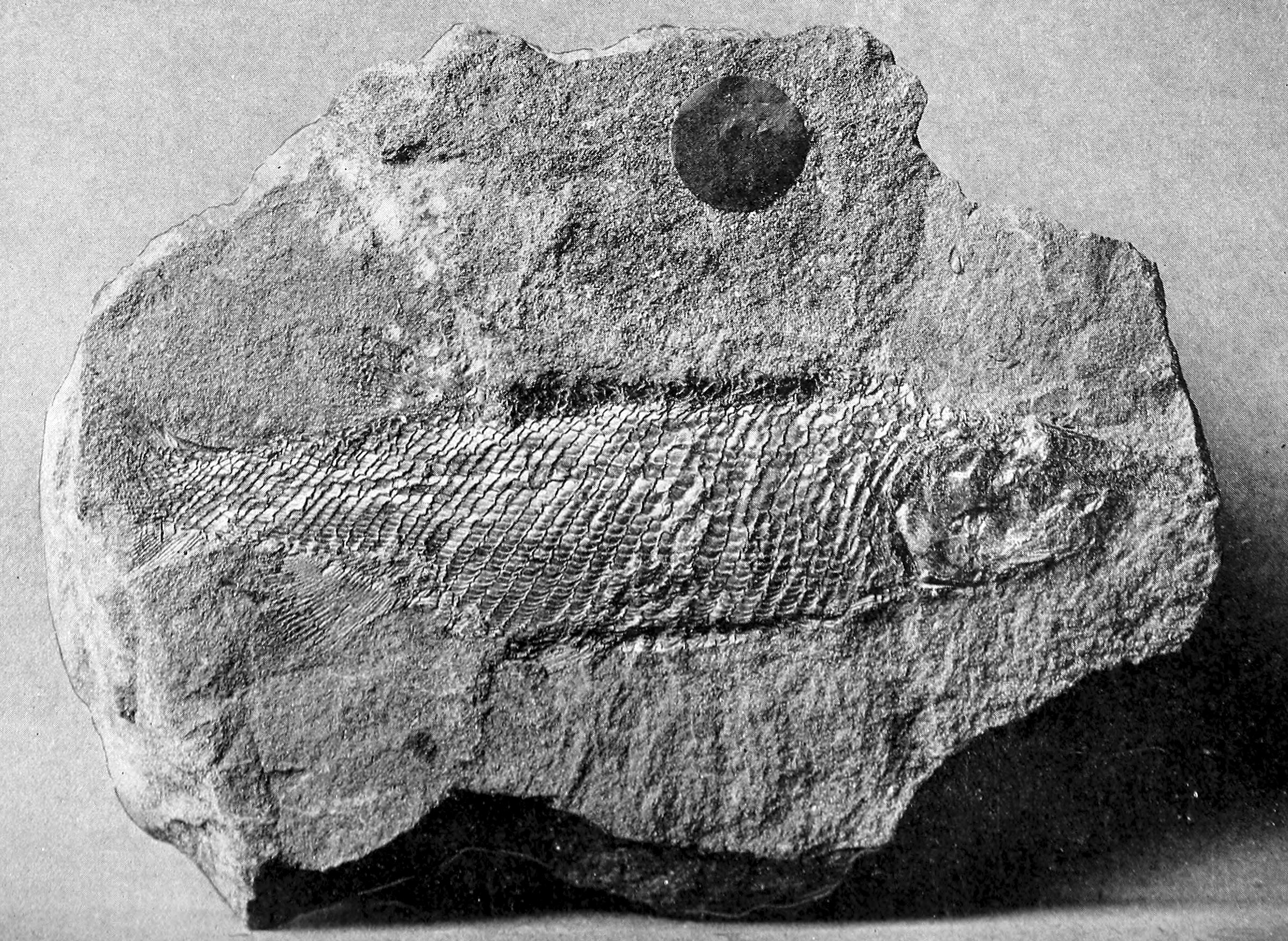
Fossil specimen

It was initially described in the genus Catopterus by naturalist John Howard Redfield, but later taxonomic revisions found Catopterus to already be a synonym for the early lungfish Dipterus. Due to this, Oliver Perry Hay reclassified it into the new genus Redfieldius, named in honor of Redfield. Previously, many other species were classified into Catopterus/Redfieldius, but most of these have either been synonymized with R. gracilis or (in the case of former Triassic species classified into this genus) moved into their own genera.

== Distribution ==
Redfieldius appears to have been widespread in the rift lakes of the upper Newark Supergroup, with fossils known from Connecticut (East Berlin, Portland & Shuttle Meadow Formations), New Jersey (Boonton Formation), and Virginia (Midland Formation). There have also been reports from Massachusetts, but no specimens have been identified.

== Description ==
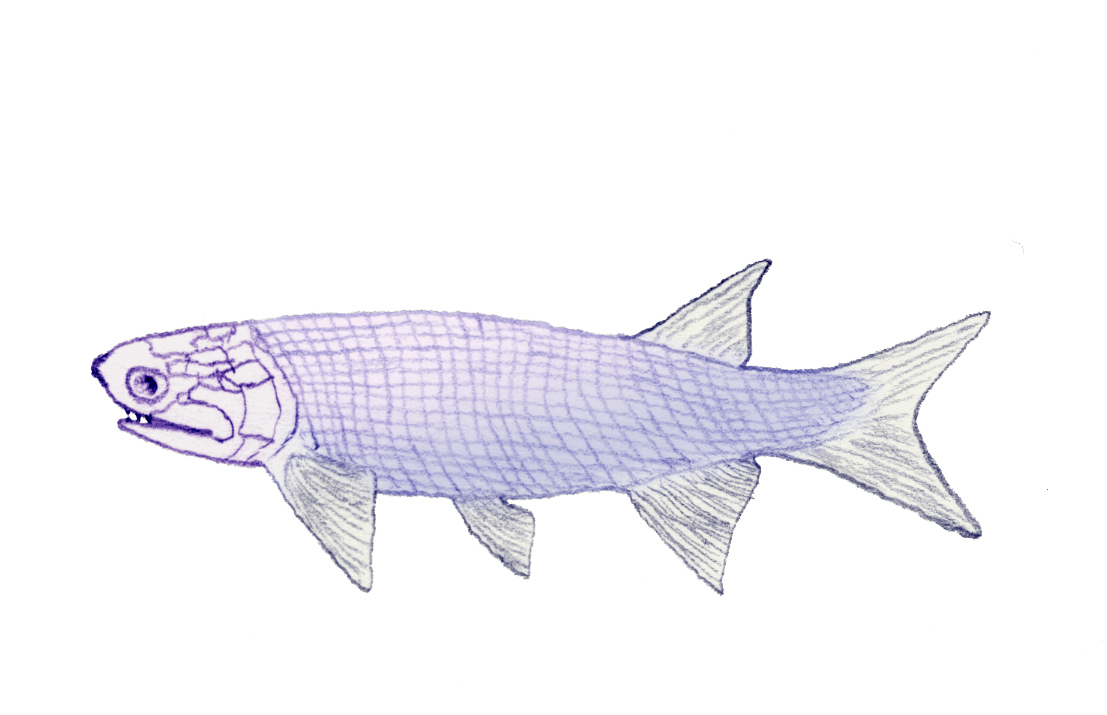
Life restoration

Redfieldius was of medium size, and usually did not exceed 20 centimeters in length. The body was slightly robust, oval in shape; the snout was rounded, the eyes large and the mouth was equipped with small teeth. Like all its close relatives, Redfieldius also had a single triangular dorsal fin set far back, practically mirroring the anal fin, which was very similar in shape and size. The ventral fins were small, while the pectoral fins were slightly larger. The caudal fin was slightly heterocercal, while there was a single branchiostegal reduced to a plate-shaped bone. All the fins were equipped with extremely thin fulcrums. The scales were rhomboid, and those in the anterior part of the body were larger, arranged in diagonal rows. The external nasal opening was enclosed by a premaxillary bone, a nasal, a rostral and an adnasal bone. Redfieldius, unlike other closely related fish, had a skull heavily ornamented with tubercles, particularly the area around the orbit and the tip of the snout.
