= Watchung Outliers =

Mountain in New York, United States

Coordinates: 40.511°N 74.866°W

The Watchung Outliers include six areas of isolated low hills and rock outcrops of volcanic and sedimentary origin in the U.S. states of New York, New Jersey, and Pennsylvania. These geologic outliers are primarily diminutive and detached remnants of the Triassic/Jurassic age Watchung Mountain basalt flows with intervening layers of sedimentary rock. All six of the outliers are found along the western edge of the Newark Basin, occupying small synclines adjacent to the Ramapo fault system. The outliers, from north to south, are known as: Ladentown, Union Hill, New Germantown/Oldwick (including Round Top), Prospect Hill, Sand Brook, and Jacksonwald.

== Ladentown Outlier ==
The Ladentown Outlier is the most northern of the Watchung Outliers, located along the border of the Town of Haverstraw and Ramapo, New York, approximately seven miles north of the maximum extent of the Watchung Mountains at Campgaw Mountain. The outlier is completely composed of volcanic trap rock, the Ladentown basalt, which covers a considerable area, running at or beneath the surface for a length of about two miles with a width of about a mile. Originally, because of its close proximity to the Palisades, the Ladentown basalt was thought to be an extension of the intrusive sill. It is now known from magnetic and gravity measurements that the Ladentown basalt is linked to the Palisades by a significant subsurface volcanic dike, but it is definitely an extrusive feature, displaying Orange Mountain Basalt characteristic of First Watchung Mountain. This makes the Ladentown basalt unique among the Watchung basalts in that it appears to be rooted to an intrusive feature. In this respect, the Ladentown basalt can be thought of as the remains of a fissure volcano, owing to the extrusion's slab-like character and ramping profile. New research indicates that the vicinity of Ladentown may have served as the primary vent from which the magma of the Palisades Sill erupted to the surface to form the Watchung flood basalts.

== Union Hill ==
Union Hill is located near the village of Suffern in Ramapo, New York, about three and a half miles north of the Watchung Mountains, or about halfway between the Ladentown Outlier and Campgaw Mountain. The hill, primarily composed of trap rock, originally rose 150 feet above the surrounding terrain, but extensive quarrying has since obliterated most of the hill except for the slopes of its perimeter. Like the Ladentown Outlier, Union Hill was once considered to be an extension of the Palisades. It was determined later in the 20th century that the hill was composed of extrusive basalt with a minimum thickness of 125 ft (38 m). However, by 2011 it was known that the outlier, once considered to consist only of a single type of basalt, is more complex than originally thought. The outermost part of the outlier is composed of an elongated arc of Orange Mountain Basalt. Lying within this arc and stratigraphically above it is a band of sedimentary rock from the Feltville Formation. Finally, lying within and above the band of sedimentary rock is a central area of Preakness Mountain Basalt which constitutes the portion of the outlier reduced by quarrying.

== New Germantown Outlier ==
The New Germantown Outlier (also known as the Oldwick Outlier) is the most northern of the outliers south of the Watchung Mountains. The hills of the New Germantown Outlier are located along the border of Tewksbury Township and Readington Township, New Jersey, approximately seven miles southwest of the southern extent of the Watchungs and about three miles north of Cushetunk Mountain. The structure of the New Germantown Outlier appears to mirror the construction of the Watchung Mountains on a tiny scale. The eastern side of the feature consists of a horseshoe shaped ridge with prongs facing to the west. This ridge is composed of Orange Mountain (First Watchung Mountain) basalt which is actively quarried. West of this First Watchung-like ridge is a valley occupied by sedimentary layers of the Feltville Formation, characteristic of the valley between the First and Second ridges of the Watchungs. Finally, at the center of the horseshoe is a dome of volcanic rock forming a hill known as Round Top. The hill is composed of Preakness Mountain Basalt, making it the equivalent of Second Watchung Mountain in the New Germantown complex. The thickness of basalt in this outlier is estimated at close to 425 ft (~130 m).

== Prospect Hill ==
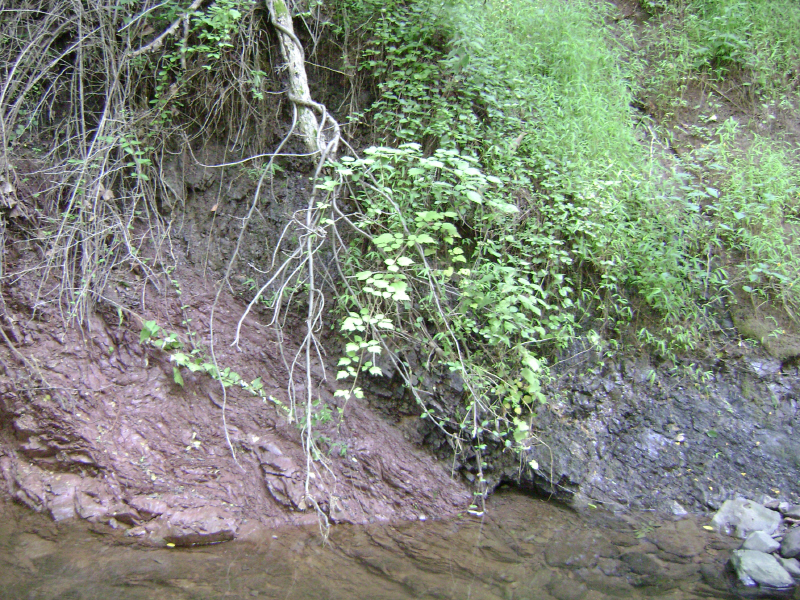
Contact between basalt lava and underlying shale at Prospect Hill

Located along the border of western Flemington and Raritan Township, New Jersey, Prospect Hill constitutes the smallest of the Watchung Outliers, being approximately one fourth of a mile wide and extending north to south for less than half a mile. The hill is composed of Orange Mountain Basalt, with no overlying Jurassic sediments apparent. Dikes branching south from the vicinity of the outlier appear to be connected to the intrusive igneous Sourland Mountain, an extension of the Palisades Sill. In this respect, Prospect Hill likely marks another location where the Palisades magma found a way to the surface, albeit not as significant as in the Ladentown Outlier.

== Sand Brook Outlier ==
The Sand Brook Outlier, located in the eastern part of Delaware Township, New Jersey, appears nearly identical in construction to the New Germantown Outlier. A low ridge composed of Orange Mountain Basalt forms a horseshoe around the eastern edge of a belt of sedimentary strata from the Feltville Formation. In the middle of the outlier is a dome-like structure of what is likely Preakness Mountain Basalt, not unlike Round Top in the New Germantown complex. The thickness of the basalt in this outlier is estimated at nearly 400 ft (~120 m), similar to New Germantown.

== Jacksonwald Outlier ==
The Jacksonwald Outlier is the only Watchung Outlier in Pennsylvania. It is located over 100 km southwest of the actual Watchung Mountains in Exeter Township. The outlier shares some similarity with the Sand Brook and New Germantown outliers. As in the other two outliers, the Jacksonwald Outlier features a low, horseshoe shaped ridge of Orange Mountain Basalt (sometimes referred to as just the Jacksonwald Basalt) that embraces an area composed of sedimentary strata from the Feltville Formation. However, unlike in the Sand Brook and New Germantown outliers, the Jacksonwald Outlier lacks a central dome of Preakness Mountain Basalt. The thickness of the basalt in this outlier is estimated to be in excess of 325 ft (~100 m).

An interesting trait of the Jacksonwald Outlier is that it is surrounded by a ridge of intrusive diabase on its eastern side. The diabase, which lies stratagraphically below the basalt, is thought to have been intruded into the syncline containing the Jacksonwald Outlier during or after some degree of folding had affected local strata. The diabase is therefore considered to constitute a phacolith.

== See also ==
- Watchung Mountains
