= Towaco =

Towaco may refer to:

- Towaco, New Jersey, an unincorporated village within Montville Township, Morris County
- Towaco (NJT station), a New Jersey Transit station in Towaco
- Towaco Formation, a mapped bedrock unit of New Jersey
