= Feltville =

Feltville may refer to:

- Feltville Historic District, in Union County, New Jersey
- Feltville Formation, a mapped bedrock unit, named for the above district
