= Watchung =

Watchung may refer to:

In geology

- Watchung Mountains, a group of three long low ridges in northern New Jersey
- Watchung Outliers, six areas of isolated low hills and rock outcrops of volcanic origin in the U.S. states of New York, New Jersey, and Pennsylvania

Other

- Watchung, New Jersey, a borough in Somerset County, New Jersey
- Watchung Avenue (NJT station)
- Watchung Borough Schools
- Watchung Conference, a former high school sports association
- Watchung Hills Regional High School
- Watchung Reservation, a park in Union County, New Jersey
