= Outer Coastal Plain =

The phrase Outer Coastal Plain can refer to:

- Outer Coastal Plain (physiographic province), a geological region of New Jersey in the United States.
- Outer Coastal Plain AVA, a wine region in New Jersey recognized as an American Viticultural Area.
