= New Haven Formation =

Geological formation in Connecticut

- Stratigraphic range: Triassic - Jurassic
- Type: Formation
- Unit of: Newark Supergroup

Location
- Region: Connecticut
- Country: United States

The New Haven Formation is a geologic formation in Connecticut. It preserves fossils dating back to the Triassic period.

== See also ==
- List of fossiliferous stratigraphic units in Connecticut
