= Stockton Formation =

Geological Formation in the United States

- Stratigraphic range: Late Triassic, Late Carnian to Early Norian
- Type: Formation
- Unit of: Newark Supergroup
- Underlies: Lockatong Formation

Lithology
- Primary: sandstone
- Other: siltstone, mudstone

Location
- Region: Pennsylvania, New Jersey, and New York
- Country: United States

Type section
- Named for: Stockton, New Jersey

The Triassic Stockton Formation is a mapped bedrock unit in Pennsylvania, New Jersey, and New York. It is named after Stockton, New Jersey, where it was first described. It is laterally equivalent to the New Oxford Formation in the Gettysburg Basin of Pennsylvania and Maryland.

== Description ==
The Stockton is defined as a light-gray to light brown and yellowish medium to coarse grained sandstone and reddish to purplish-brown siltstone and mudstone with shale interbeds; and interbedded argillite. In New Jersey, feldspar pebbly sandstone and conglomerate, and quartz-pebble conglomerate are also mapped.

=== Depositional environment ===
The Stockton is described as a bajada. The sediments were a result of the rifting of Pangea. The sediments came from the southeast from a largely granitic terrane and spread across an even plain. Interfingered with the Stockton, the Lockatong Formation are lake sediments, which grew during wetter climatic cycles during the Late Triassic.

=== Fossils ===
Some fossils found within the Stockton Formation are fossil ferns including Sphenopteris sitholeyi. (Virginia Museum of Natural History Guidebook, no 1, p83.)

== Age ==
Relative age dating of the Stockton places it in the Upper Triassic System, i.e., deposition between 237 and 207 (±5) million years ago. It rests unconformably a top many different formations of the Appalachian Piedmont. It interfingers with the Lockatong Formation and also rests conformably below the Passaic Formation. There are numerous diabase intrusions into the Stockton with local contact metamorphic rocks. Conchostrachan fossil-based dating finds it to be middle Carnian in age, whereas astrochronological dating finds it to last from the late Carnian to the early Norian.

== See also ==
- Geology of New Jersey
- Geology of Pennsylvania
