= Meriden Group =

- Stratigraphic range: Jurassic
- Type: Group

Location
- Region: Connecticut
- Country: United States

The Meriden Group is a geologic group, part of the Newark Supergroup, in Connecticut. It preserves fossils dating back to the Jurassic period.

The group consists of the East Berlin Formation, Holyoke Basalt, Shuttle Meadow Formation, and Talcott Basalt.

== See also ==
- List of fossiliferous stratigraphic units in Connecticut
