= Palisades Sill =

Large outcrop on the western Hudson River Valley

Coordinates: 40.9738°N 73.9103°W

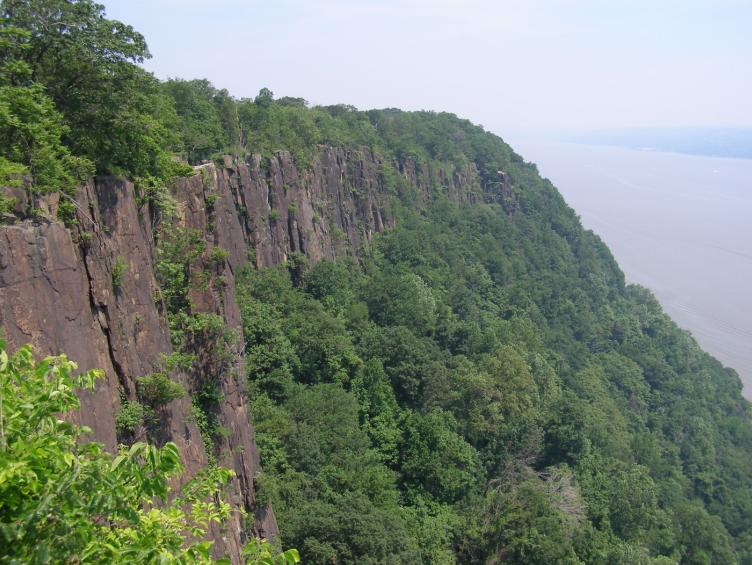
The Palisades Sill as seen from the Palisades Interstate Parkway. The Hudson River is the background.

The Palisades Sill is a Triassic, 200 Ma diabase intrusion. It extends through portions of New York and New Jersey. It is most noteworthy for the Palisades, the cliffs that rise steeply above the western bank of the Hudson River. The ideal location and accessibility of the sill, as well as its unique features, have generated much attention from nature enthusiasts, rock climbers, and geologists alike.

== Location ==
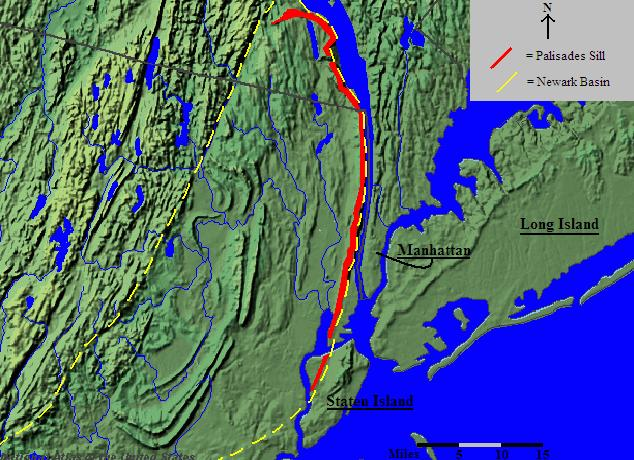
Location map of the Palisades Sill (red) within the Newark Basin (yellow)

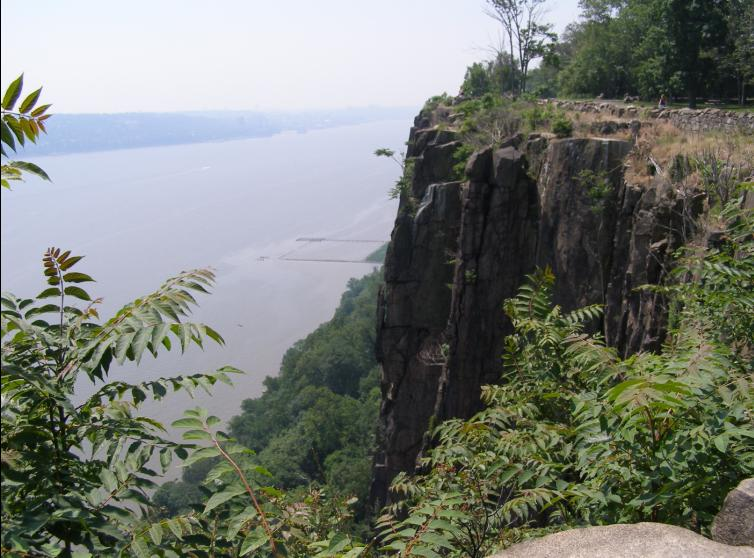
The Palisades rising above the Hudson River

The outcrop of the Palisades Sill is quite recognizable for its prominent cliffs above the Hudson River; it is easily seen from the western portions of Manhattan. The exposure is approximately 80 kilometers (50 mi) long, most of it following the Hudson River. It first emerges in Staten Island in New York City. The sill then crosses the state line into New Jersey, where Jersey City, Union City, Fort Lee, and Englewood Cliffs all lie on it.

The sill eventually crosses back into New York, following the Hudson River north until reaching Haverstraw. It is at this point that the sill makes a turn to the west, where it disappears near Pomona. At this turn, the sill cuts across local strata, making it a dike in that area, not a sill.

It has been proposed that the sill reemerges in two locations in Pennsylvania (where the outcrops are also discordant with local strata), but this idea is not generally agreed upon, and discussion of the Palisades Sill is usually limited to the exposure in New York and New Jersey.

A portion of the sill is also home to the Palisades Interstate Parkway, a stretch of road that passes through the park area preserved by John D. Rockefeller to protect its natural beauty.

== Geology ==
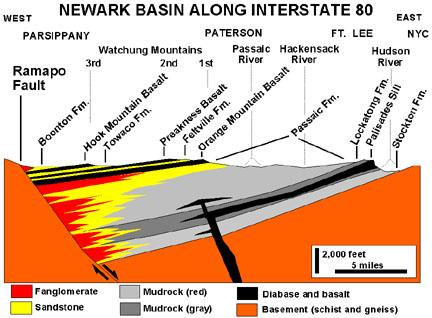
USGS cross-section of the Newark Basin. The Palisades sill is shown intruded into the second layer (Lockatong formation) above west dipping precambrian basement (orange colored) blocks.

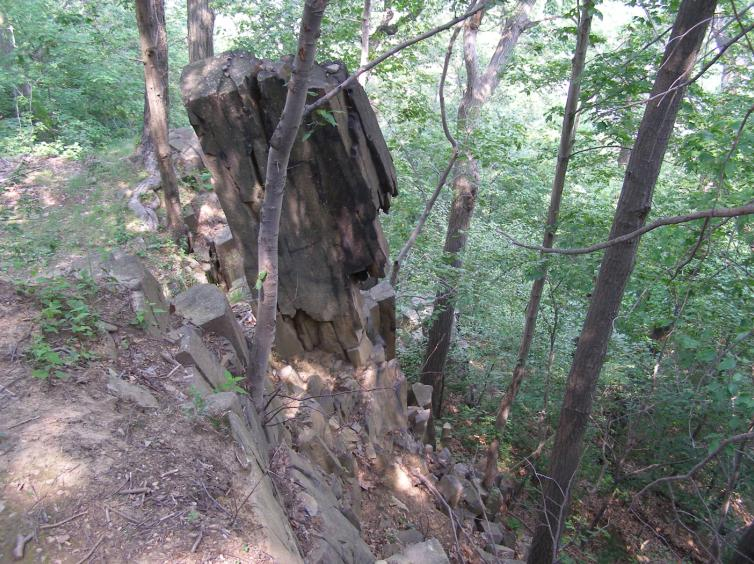
Columnar jointing in the Palisades Sill

The end of the Triassic Period saw large-scale rifting during the break-up of Pangaea. What is now eastern North America began to separate from what is now north-western Africa, creating the young Atlantic Ocean. Magma was generated through decompression melting, and a portion of it was intruded into the sandstones and arkoses of the Stockton Formation within the Newark Basin, one of the Eastern North America Rift Basins. The magma would eventually solidify and, after millions of years, the overlying rocks would be uplifted and eroded, exposing the Palisades Sill as we know it today.

The composition of the sill is that of diabase, although its mineral assemblage is not uniform throughout the thickness of the body. The mineralogy of the sill consists principally of plagioclase feldspar, several varieties of pyroxenes, and olivine, with minor biotite, titanite, zircon and oxides.

Most researchers report that, generally speaking, the sill becomes progressively differentiated as one moves away from either the upper or lower contact. The "sandwich horizon" is the term given to the central region where both cooling fronts met; it is here where the diabase is the most differentiated.

The most intriguing geological feature of the sill is a 10-meter-thick olivine-rich zone roughly 10 meters (30 ft) from the lower contact. The modal percent of olivine goes from 0-2% within the main body of the sill to up to 28% within this layer. It is the origin of this layer, and subsequently, the sill as a whole, that has generated much of the attention, as well as the varying origin theories proposed for the intrusion (see below).

There is an average stratigraphic thickness of 300 meters (~1000 feet), with the famous cliffs rising 100 meters (300 ft) on average above sea level. The intrusion dips between 10 and 15 degrees westward for most of its length. It has been determined through stratigraphic studies that the sill was intruded at a depth of approximately 3-5 kilometers. These studies also concluded that the sill was emplaced in a position nearly identical to its current one (10-to-15-degree dip); this is further confirmed by the still-vertical orientation of the columnar jointing.

It has been proposed that the Watchung basalt flows of the Watchung Mountains are extrusive eruptions of the same magma that created the Palisades Sill. Magnetic and gravity measurements have indicated the presence of a large subsurface dike between the Palisades intrusion and the Ladentown basalt, an extrusive body of Watchung basalt north of Suffern, New York. More recently, the various Watchung flows have been correlated to geochemically distinct layers within the Palisades sill, bolstering the theory that eruptions of the Palisades magma were responsible for the episodic flood basalts of the Newark Basin.

== Origin ==
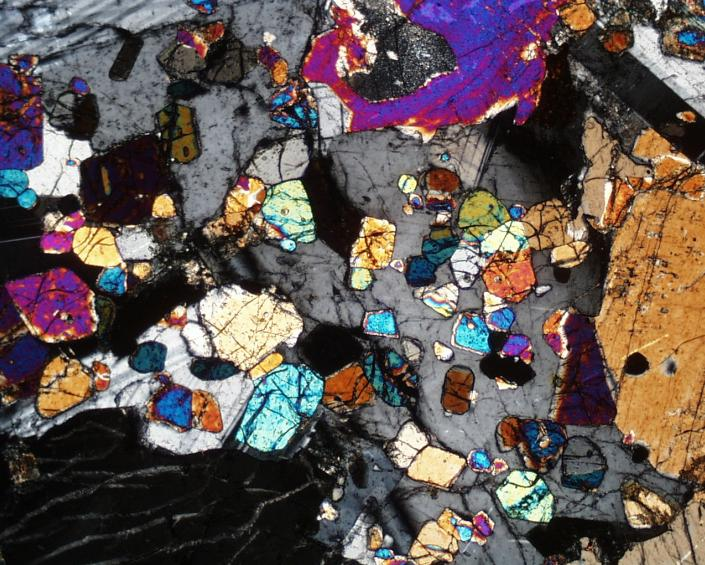
Photomicrograph of a thin section showing the strong presence of olivine (brightly colored, rounded grains) surrounded by plagioclase and pyroxene grains within the olivine-rich zone. Crossed polars, 40x

Due to the presence of the olivine-rich zone, the normally difficult task of determining the history of an igneous body becomes even tougher.

- The original studies concluded that the sill was the result of a single injection of magma. The variety in mineralogy was credited to simple crystal fractionation.
- The next model introduced whole rock geochemistry data and determined that there were at least two separate injections; an olivine-rich magma was followed by normal tholeiitic basalt.
- The third hypothesis instead proposed at least three, but probably four separate pulses, with the olivine-rich magma being the final one. This was also conjectured through the use of whole-rock chemistry.

Each of these theories supported the idea of crystal fractionation playing a significant, if not total, role in the differentiation of the sill. A single source for the magma was assumed.

- The latest conclusion reached for the origin of the intrusion was that the olivine in the olivine-rich zone could not have been in equilibrium with the rest of the body, indicating more than one source for the magma. This was determined through mass balance equations. It was also suggested that lateral flow within the still-liquid body played as important a role in differentiation as fractionation.

Due to the interest in the subject, and a lack of a satisfactory conclusion, research on the Palisades Sill is currently ongoing.

== See also ==
- Diabase
- Igneous differentiation
- Sill (geology)
