= Agawam Group =

- Stratigraphic range: Jurassic
- Type: Group

Location
- Region: Connecticut
- Country: United States

The Agawam Group is a geologic group in Connecticut. It preserves fossils dating back to the Jurassic period.

== See also ==
- List of fossiliferous stratigraphic units in Connecticut
