= Turseodus =

Turseodus Temporal range: Carnian–Norian ~237–208.5 Ma

Scientific classification
- Kingdom: Animalia
- Phylum: Chordata
- Class: Actinopterygii
- Family: †Turseoidae
- Genus: †Turseodus; Leidy 1857

Type species
- †T. acutus Leidy, 1857

Other Species
- †T. dolorensis Schaeffer, 1967

Synonyms
- †Gwyneddichthis Bock, 1959; †Eurecana Bock, 1959

Extinct genus of fish

Turseodus is an extinct genus of ray-finned fish found in Late Triassic freshwater sediments of the United States. Two species have been described, T. acutus from the Lockatong Formation (Carnian stage) of Pennsylvania, and T. dolorensis from the Chinle Formation (Norian stage) of Colorado.

== Classification ==
Although previously placed in the paraphyletic family Palaeoniscidae, Turseodus was later referred to its own family, Turseoidae, by Wilhelm Bock. The lachrymal bone of Turseodus forms part of the oral margin, an unusual condition known otherwise only from the Early to Middle Triassic Pteronisculus. Based on this synapomorphy and other similarities, a close relationship between Turseodus and Pteronisculus is hypothesized. There are also similarities with Turfania from the Permian of China. However, a close evolutionary relationship between these genera has not yet been tested by cladistic analyses.

== See also ==
- Prehistoric fish
- List of prehistoric bony fish
