= Shuttle Meadow Formation =

Geological Formation in Connecticut and Massachusetts

- Stratigraphic range: Hettangian; ~201–199 Ma
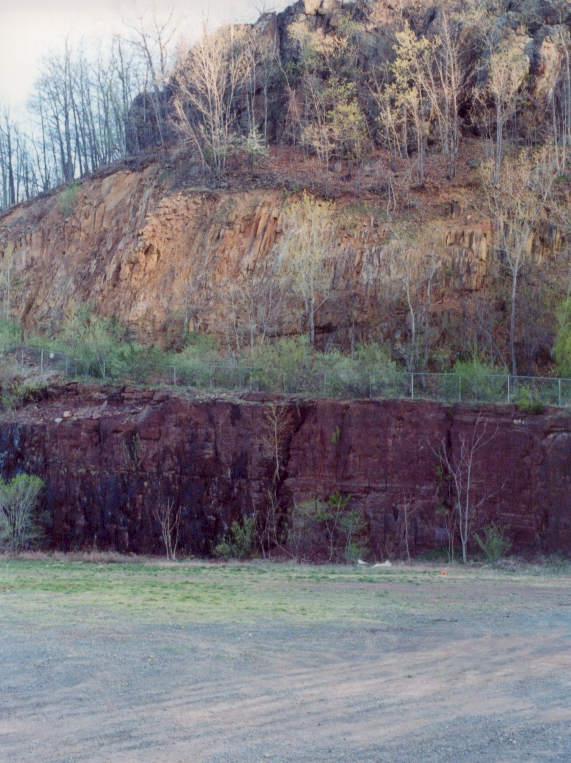
- Talcott Formation over Shuttle Meadow Formation in a quarry (Connecticut)
- Type: Geological formation
- Unit of: Newark Supergroup; Meriden Group
- Underlies: Talcott Formation

Lithology
- Primary: Black shale
- Other: Siltstone

Location
- Coordinates: 41.4°N 72.7°W
- Approximate paleocoordinates: 22.1°N 19.5°W
- Region: New England
- Country: United States
- Extent: Connecticut and Massachusetts
- Shuttle Meadow Formation (the United States) Shuttle Meadow Formation (Connecticut)

The Shuttle Meadow Formation is a Mesozoic geologic formation in the Hartford Basin in Connecticut and Massachusetts, USA. Insect fossils of Mormolucoides articulatus and dinosaur remains are among the fossils that have been recovered from the formation; Coelophysis sp.

== See also ==
- List of dinosaur-bearing rock formations
  - List of stratigraphic units with indeterminate dinosaur fossils
