= East Berlin Formation =

Geologic formation in the United States

- Stratigraphic range: Early Jurassic 201.3–174.7 Ma
- Type: Geological formation
- Unit of: Newark Supergroup

Lithology
- Primary: Mudstone ,Siltstone ,Mudrock ,Shale , Sandstone

Location
- Region: New England
- Country: United States
- Extent: Massachusetts and Connecticut

The East Berlin Formation is an Early Jurassic geological formation in New England, United States. Dinosaur footprints and trackways are abundant in this formation. These tracks include Eubrontes (belonging to medium-sized-theropods similar to Dilophosaurus), Anchisauripus (belonging to small theropods like Coelophysis), and Anomoepus (belonging to indeterminate small ornithischians). Several museums, parks, and tourist attractions are based around the East Berlin Formation's dinosaur tracks, including Dinosaur State Park in Rocky Hill, Connecticut and Powder Hill Dinosaur Park in Middlefield, Connecticut.

Although the East Berlin Formation was originally intended to apply to the Hartford Basin of Connecticut and Massachusetts, equivalent strata is found elsewhere in the Newark Supergroup. Equivalent formations include the Waterfall Formation (Culpeper Basin; Virginia, Maryland), Towaco Formation (Newark Basin; New Jersey), White Oaks Formation (Pomperaug Basin, Connecticut), and Turner Falls Sandstone (Deerfield Basin, Massachusetts).

== Despositional environment ==
The formation was deposited in an alluvial and lacustrine half-graben succession which was deposited in a climate semi-arid in nature. A 2026 study on certain Eubrontes tracks show that they were made in an area with an ephemeral lake system rather than at the margin of a perennial lake in the Hartfort basin.

== Fossil content ==
Color key: Taxon / Reclassified taxon / Taxon falsely reported as present / Dubious taxon or junior synonym / Ichnotaxon / Ootaxon / Morphotaxon	Notes; Uncertain or tentative taxa are in small text; ~~crossed out~~ taxa are discredited.

Dinosaurs from the East Berlin Formation
Genus	Species	Material	Notes	Images
Anchisauripus			Made by small theropods similar to Coelophysis	
Anomoepus			Made by indeterminate small ornithischians	
Eubrontes			Made by medium-sized-theropods similar to Dilophosaurus	

== See also ==
- List of dinosaur-bearing rock formations
  - List of stratigraphic units with ornithischian tracks
    - Indeterminate ornithischian tracks
