= Geology of New Jersey =

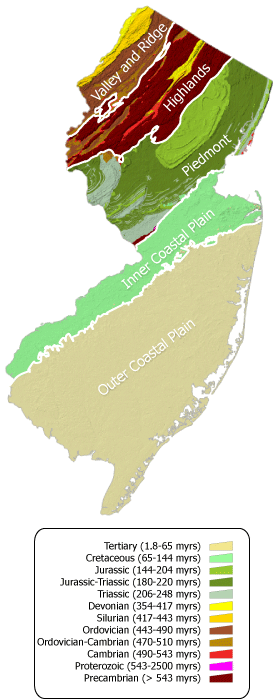
Physiographic Provinces of New Jersey

New Jersey is a very geologically and geographically diverse region in the United States' Middle Atlantic region, offering variety from the Appalachian Mountains and the Highlands in the state's northwest, to the Atlantic Coastal Plain region that encompasses both the Pine Barrens and the Jersey Shore. The state's geological features have impacted the course of settlement, development, commerce and industry over the past four centuries.

New Jersey has four distinct physiographic provinces. They are: (listed from the south to the north) the Atlantic Coastal Plain Province, the Piedmont Province, the Highlands Province, and the Ridge and Valley Province.

== Coastal Plain ==
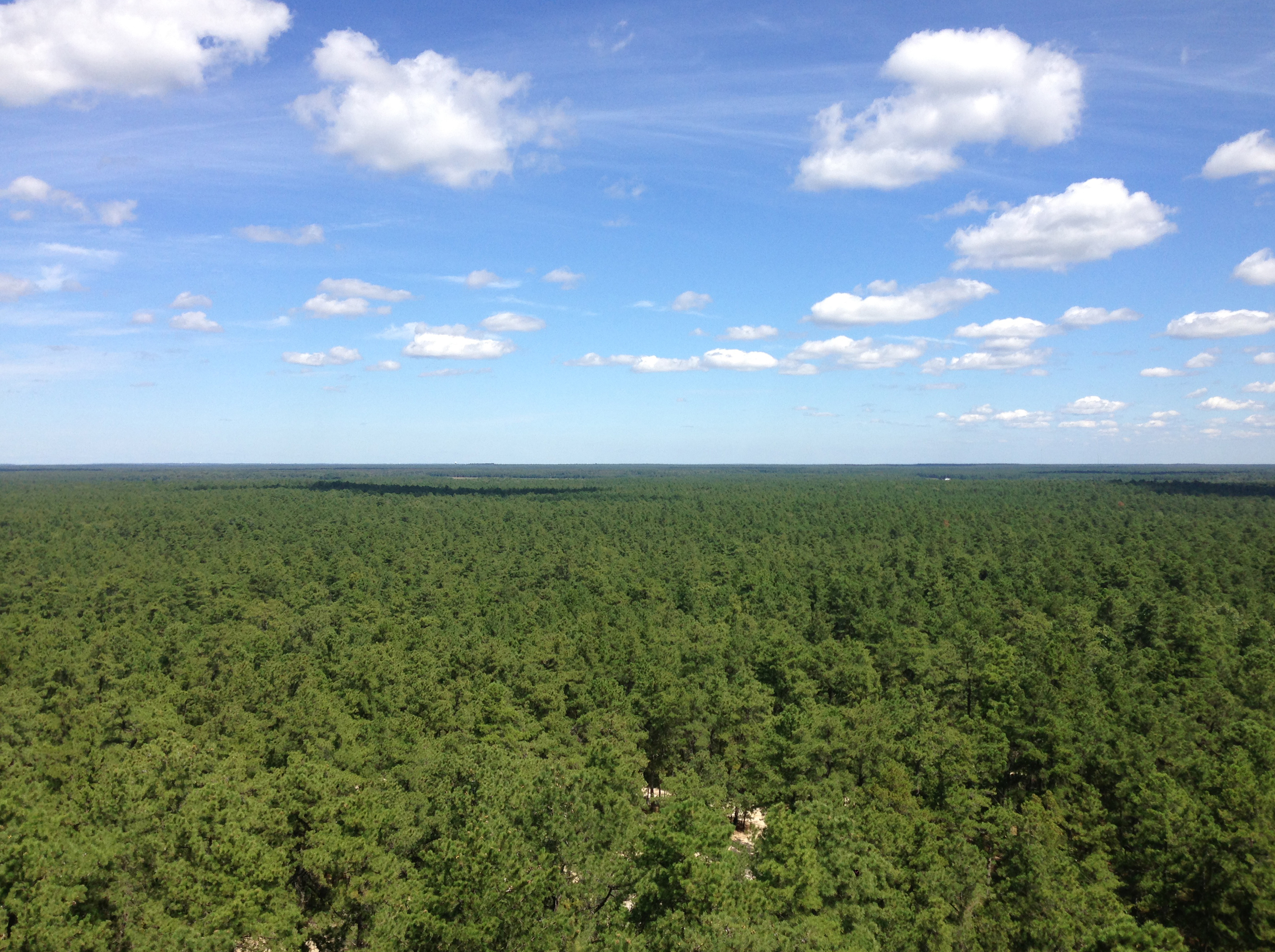
View north from the fire tower on Apple Pie Hill in Wharton State Forest, Tabernacle Township, New Jersey

The largest province in the state encompasses the southeast part of the state below the fall zone from Trenton to Carteret. It contains a large wedge of unconsolidated sediments that have been deposited since the Cretaceous Period. These sediments continue off-shore as far as the continental shelf edge in the Atlantic Ocean. Topography is relatively flat with a few hills of erosion resistant sediments containing gravel or iron-sedimented sands. The province is divided further into three subprovinces. One is the Lowland section, which comprises flat, frequently inundated areas of tidal marshes, back bays, and barrier islands. This section generally follows the coastline, Delaware Bay, and Delaware River. The intermediate upland section comprises raised areas inland and is best suited for farming and other agriculture. The sands of the coastal plain have been mined for foundry sand and sand used for glass making. Finally, the upland section is home to the New Jersey Pine Barrens and Fort Dix. Glauconite is commonly found in this section, especially around Freehold Township, New Jersey.

== Piedmont ==
A majority of the rocks in this province are a part of the Newark Supergroup. They include the Passaic Formation, the Lockatong Formation, the Stockton Formation, and the igneous rocks basalt and diabase. In New Jersey, more basalt flows are evident with several named formations including the Hook Mountain Basalt, the Preakness Basalt, and the Orange Mountain Basalt. Diabase is prominently displayed along the Hudson River in the Palisades Sill. These rocks were deposited during the rifting of Pangea during the Triassic and Jurassic Periods. Much of the northern segment of this region was glaciated and the resultant shaping help to form New York and Newark harbors.

A small portion of the Pennsylvania Piedmont Highlands called the Trenton Prong extends into New Jersey through Trenton and are mostly Ediacaran and Cambrian aged rocks, that includes the Wissahickon Formation. The Manhattan schist exists in New Jersey, largely below New York harbor and in the vicinity of Bayonne and Jersey City.

== Highlands ==
The Highland Province consists of the remnants of a billion year old mountain range that stretched from Newfoundland to Mexico on the edge of the North American continent and was created in the Grenville Orogeny.

To the east of the Kittatinny Valley is the Highland province. A narrow fault of Hardyston Quartzite separates the Kittatinny Valley from the Highlands. Igneous and metamorphic rock from the Late Precambrian and Early Paleozoic era, make up the Highlands. Kittatinny and Franklin formation, along with Hardyston Quartzite are in the Highlands. The New Jersey Highlands geology is complicated due to complex patterns of folds, faults and intrusions.

The Highland Province has the Wawayanda Mountains which has an elevation of 1448 at two peaks; Sparta Mountain, elevation 1232: Pochuck Mountain, elevation 1194, north of Lake Pochung; Hamburg Mountain, elevation 1495 east of Lake Wildwood.

This section contains some the oldest rocks in New Jersey and is largely a mix of Pre-Cambrian granites and gneisses and lower Paleozoic clastic and carbonate rocks. The harder granites and gneisses produce steep sided hills and mountains since they are relatively resistant to erosion. There are two small klippes in the southern part of this province, the Jutland klippe south of Musconetcong Mountain and the Peapack klippe in southern Morris County.

There are numerous active and abandoned mines in this area because of its rich mineral wealth. Iron, zinc, and marble were all important minerals mined from the New Jersey Highlands. Franklinite is a mineral first described at Sterling Hill Mine.

Green Pond Mountain in Northern Passaic County and into western Morris County is a slice of Lower Cambrian to Middle Devonian rocks that are collected in a half graben and are detached from the Valley and Ridge sequence. These rocks have always been described separately from the rocks in the Valley and Ridge, but have been cross-correlated to those rocks.

== Ridge and Valley ==
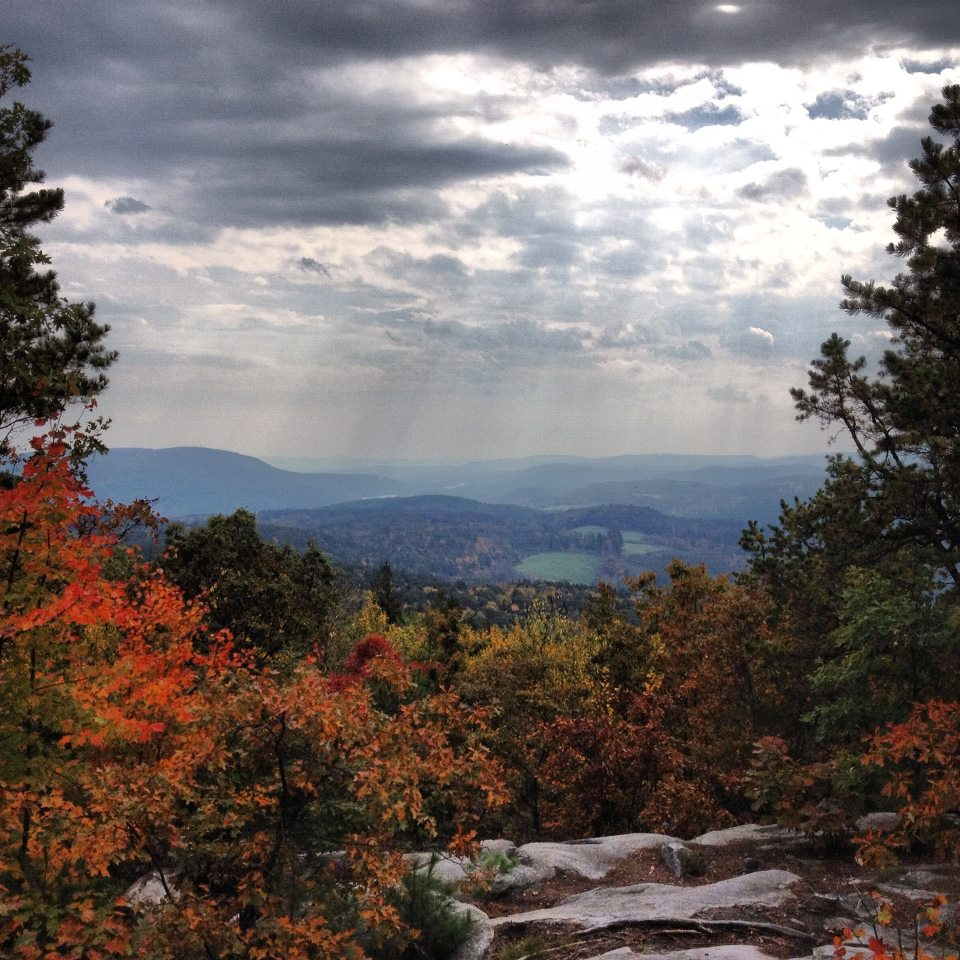
Looking east from the ridge of Kittatinny Mountain in Walpack Township

The smallest province in the state, it is confined to the northwest corner of the state. The Kittatinny Valley is a part of the Great Appalachian Valley and contain some of the oldest rocks of the province known as the Matinsburg shale created during the Ordovician period. At the edge of this valley is the Kittatinny Ridge which is from 1500 feet to 1800 feet. The ridge goes in a northeast–southwest axis. Beyond this ridge, there are series of rolling hills and small ridges underlain by Silurian and Devonian aged rocks.

The Kittatinny Ridge was created about four hundred million years ago when a small continent that was long and thin collided with proto North America. The strike caused folding and faulting which cause the Silurian Shawnagunk conglomerate which is made mostly of quartz, to rise out of a shallow sea. The heat from pressure caused the quartz to bend, and silica melted the quartz granules together along with other stone. Millions of years of erosion from rain, wind, snow, ice shaped the mountain and valley to its present configuration. The Wisconsin glacier which started to form around 21,000 BC and started to melt in 13,000 BC left boulder fields, end moraines and a terminal moraine which starts north of Belvidere and goes east to just south of Great Meadow and continues east to just north of Budd Lake and continues east to Denville where it goes southeast toward Morristown and goes around the south end of Great Swamp.

The Delaware River is deflected by ridges and travels generally southwest, along the strike of the upturned beds of shale sedimentary rock. The Delaware flows in a riverbed of glacial till in the Minisink and Walpack buried valleys, formed from erosion of softer bedrock, then passes through the Delaware Water Gap in Kittatinny Mountain, a continuation of Blue Mountain in Pennsylvania. The buried valleys extend beyond the riverbed and stretch across the state from Pennsylvania to New York. The limestones in this area also exhibit karst topography, including sinkholes and small caves.

== Geologic Features ==
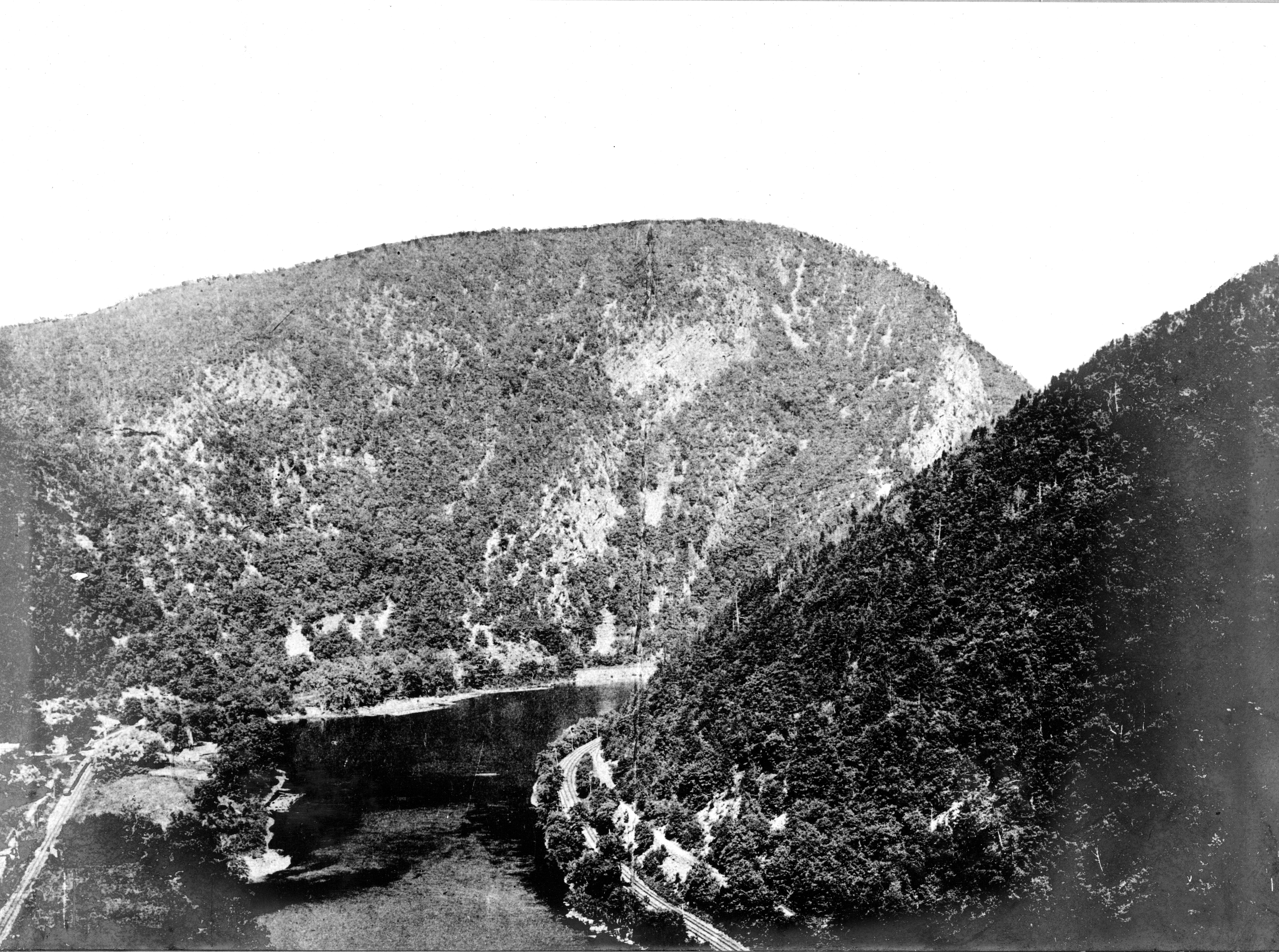
View of the Delaware Water Gap in Warren County, seen from the west

- Delaware Water Gap
- New Jersey Palisades
- Sterling Hill

== Notable Rock Formations ==
- Lockatong Formation
- Passaic Formation (former Brunswick Formation)
- Stockton Formation
- Marcellus Formation
