= Passaic Formation =

- Stratigraphic range: Late Triassic, 219–201.7 Ma
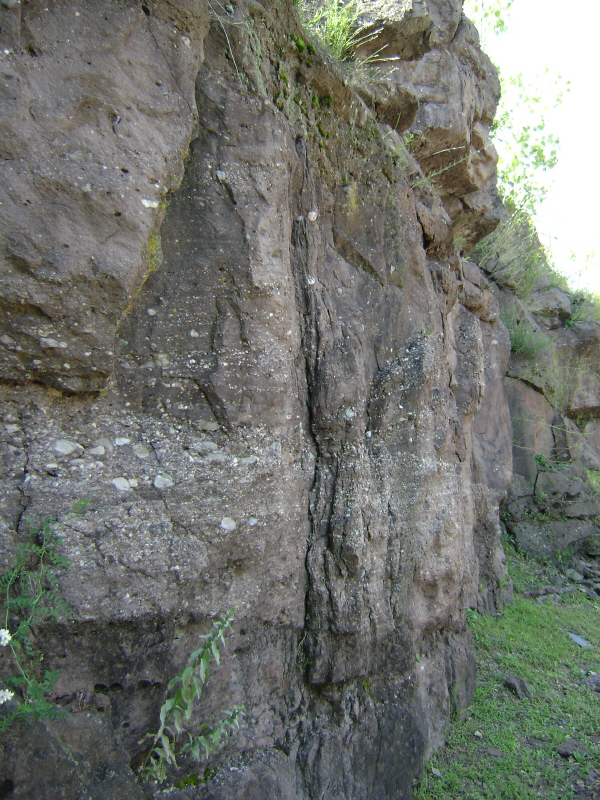
- Exposure of Passaic Formation sandstone on Goffle Hill in Hawthorne, New Jersey.
- Type: Geological formation
- Unit of: Newark Supergroup
- Underlies: Orange Mountain Basalt
- Overlies: Lockatong Formation
- Thickness: maximum of over 19,685 feet (6,000 m)

Lithology
- Primary: Siltstone, Mudstone, Shale
- Other: Sandstone, Conglomerate

Location
- Region: Newark Basin of Eastern North America Rift Basins
- Extent: ~200 miles (320 km) in New York, New Jersey, and Pennsylvania

Type section
- Named for: Passaic, New Jersey
- Named by: Paul E. Olsen, 1980

The Passaic Formation is a mapped bedrock unit in Pennsylvania, New Jersey, and New York. It was previously known as the Brunswick Formation since it was first described in the vicinity of New Brunswick, New Jersey. It is now named for the city of Passaic, New Jersey, which is near where its type section was described by paleontologist Paul E. Olsen.

== Description ==
The Passaic is defined as a reddish-brown shale, siltstone and mudstone with a few green and brown shale interbeds; red and dark-gray interbedded argillites near the base. In New Jersey, there are conglomerate and sandstone beds within the formation.

=== Depositional environment ===
The Passaic is mostly shallow lakes, playa, and alluvial fan deposits resulting from the rifting of Pangea. The red color is often evidence that the sediments were deposited in arid conditions. The Passaic Formation overlies the Lockatong Formation deep lake sediment cycles, which were deposited during wetter climatic cycles during the Late Triassic. These sediments came from the northwest and contain clasts from Appalachian formations.

=== Fossils ===
- Clepsysaurus
- Hypsognathus fenneri

== Age ==
The Passaic is Late Triassic with an astronomically calibrated age of 219 to 201.7 million years ago (Ma) and is about 13,000 ft (~4 km) thick in the basin depocenter. It conformably overlies the Lockatong Formation (darker, generally gray shales and mudrocks) and is overlain by the first Watching(Orange Mountain Formation) basalt. The Triassic/Jurassic boundary and correlated by pollen is located in the uppermost part of the formation, ~ 2 precessional cycles (~10–12 m) below the Orange Mountain Basalt. There are numerous diabase intrusions into the Passaic with local contact metamorphic rocks.

== See also ==
- Geology of Pennsylvania
- Geology of New Jersey
