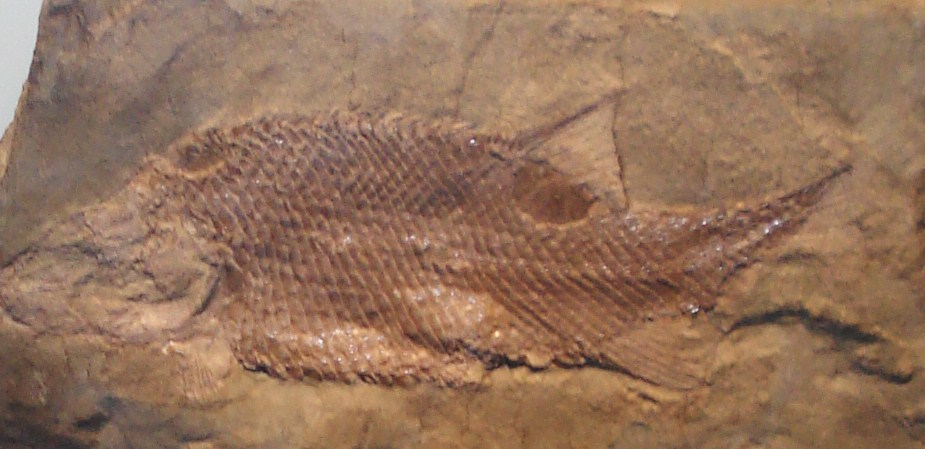
- Fossils of S. bergeri

Scientific classification
- Kingdom: Animalia
- Phylum: Chordata
- Class: Actinopterygii
- Clade: Ginglymodi
- Order: †Semionotiformes
- Superfamily: †Semionotoidea
- Family: †Semionotidae
- Genus: †Semionotus; Agassiz, 1843

= Semionotus =

Semionotus Temporal range: 248.1–184.2 Ma Early Triassic to Early Jurassic

Extinct genus of fishes

Semionotus (from Greek: σημιον semion, 'mark' and Greek: νῶτος nôtos, 'back') is an extinct genus of ray-finned fish found throughout Northern Pangaea (North America and Europe) during the late Triassic, becoming extinct in the Early Jurassic.

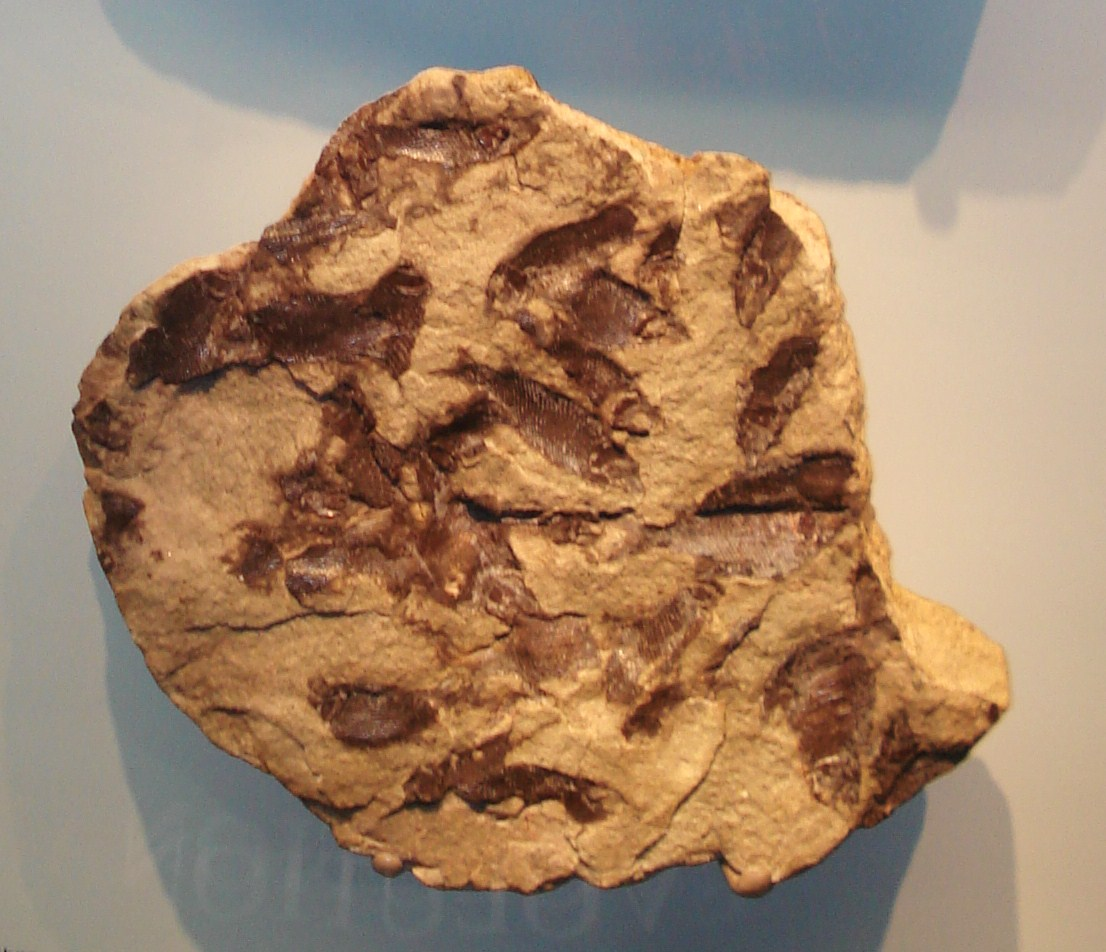
Fossil slab of S. kapffi mass mortality

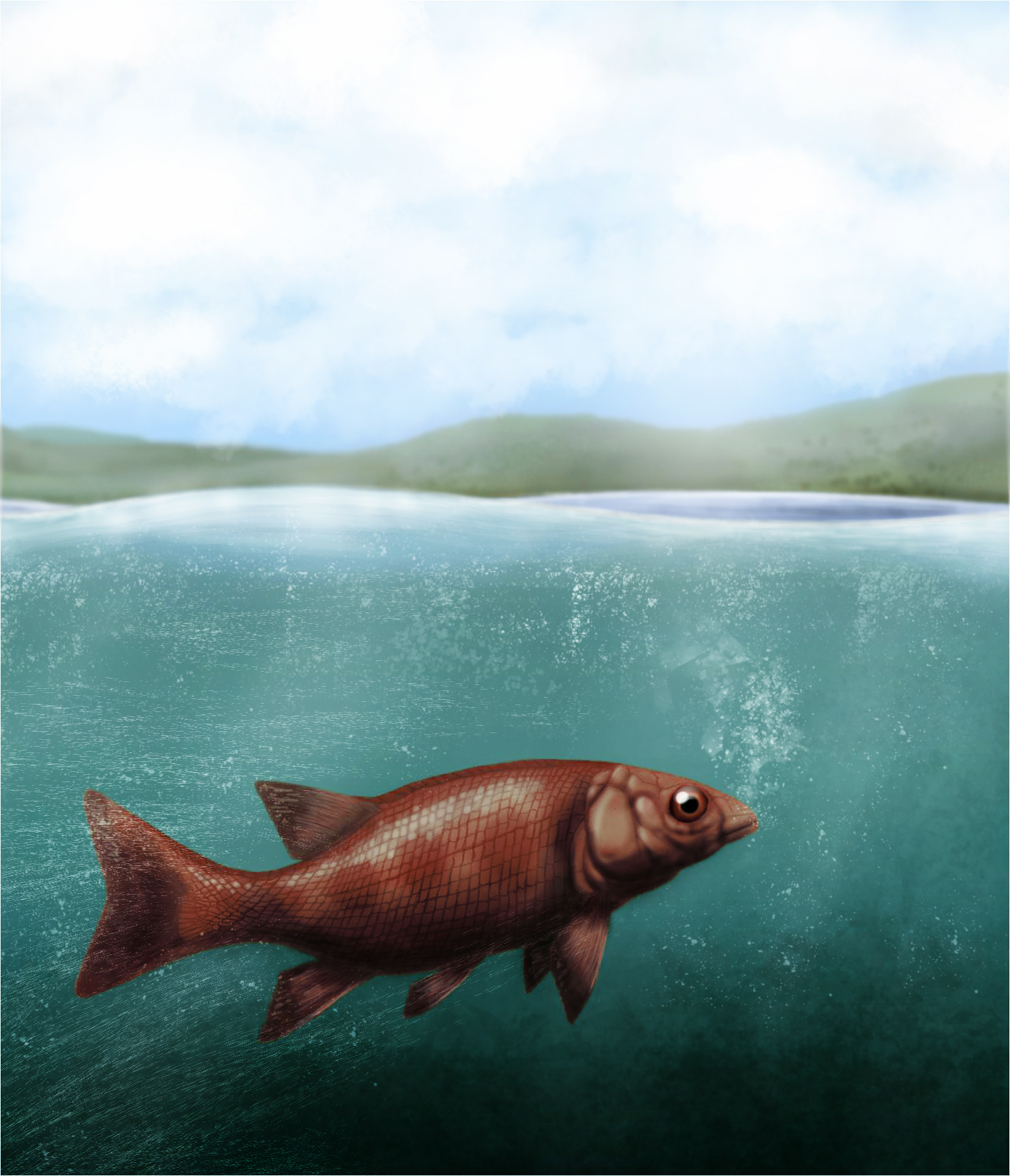
Reconstruction of a generalized individual
