= Evergreen Formation =

- Stratigraphic range: Lower Pliensbachian- Late Toarcian; ~186.74–175.94 Ma
- Type: Geological formation
- Unit of: Bundamba Group
- Sub-units: Boxvale Sandstone & Westgrove Ironstone Members
- Underlies: Hutton Sandstone
- Overlies: Precipice Sandstone
- Thickness: Up to 255 m (837 ft)

Lithology
- Primary: Sandstone, siltstone, mudstone
- Other: Coal, ironstone

Location
- Coordinates: 25.8°S 150.3°E
- Approximate paleocoordinates: 61.7°S 90.0°E
- Region: New South Wales, Queensland
- Country: Australia
- Extent: Eromanga Basin; Surat Basin

Type section
- Named for: "Evergreen Shales"
- Named by: Hogetoorn
- Evergreen Formation (Australia)

The Evergreen Formation is a Pliensbachian to Toarcian geologic formation of the Surat Basin in New South Wales and Queensland, eastern Australia. Traditionally it has been considered to be a unit whose age has been calculated in between the Pliensbachian and Toarcian stages of the Early Jurassic, with some layers suggested to reach the Aalenian stage of the Middle Jurassic, yet modern data has found that an Early Pliensbachian to Latest Toarcian age is more possible. The formation was named due to the "Evergreen Shales", defined with a lower unit, the Boxvale Sandstone, and a partially coeval, partially younger upper unit, the Westgrove Ironstone Member. This unit overlies the Hettangian-Sinemurian Precipice Sandstone, as well several informal units such as the Nogo Beds, and Narayen beds, as well Torsdale Volcanics. This unit likely was deposited in a massive lacustrine body with possible marine environment influences.

== Fossil content ==
Indeterminate Unionoid bivalves are known from the Kolane Station.

=== Ichnofossils ===
Genus	Species	Type	Location	Material	Origin	Images
Asterosoma	A. isp.	Fodinichnia	Chinchilla 4 Borehole; Condabri MB9-H Borehole; Kenya East GW7 Borehole; Moonie 31 Borehole; Moonie 34 Borehole; Reedy Creek MB3-H Borehole; Roma 8 Borehole; Taroom 17 Borehole; West Wandoan 1 Borehole; Woleebee Creek GW4 Borehole	Radiating bulb-like swelling burrows	Annelid worm, vermiform organism	
Conichnus	C. isp.	Domichnia; Cubichnia	Chinchilla 4 Borehole; Condabri MB9-H Borehole; Kenya East GW7 Borehole; Moonie 31 Borehole; Moonie 34 Borehole; Reedy Creek MB3-H Borehole; Roma 8 Borehole; Taroom 17 Borehole; West Wandoan 1 Borehole; Woleebee Creek GW4 Borehole	trails	Gastropods	
Cylindrichnus	C. isp.	Domichnia	Chinchilla 4 Borehole; Condabri MB9-H Borehole; Kenya East GW7 Borehole; Moonie 31 Borehole; Moonie 34 Borehole; Reedy Creek MB3-H Borehole; Roma 8 Borehole; Taroom 17 Borehole; West Wandoan 1 Borehole; Woleebee Creek GW4 Borehole	Long, subconical, weakly curved burrows	Anemones; Polychaete worms	
Diplocraterion	D. parallelum	Domichnia	Chinchilla 4 Borehole; Condabri MB9-H Borehole; Kenya East GW7 Borehole; Moonie 31 Borehole; Moonie 34 Borehole; Reedy Creek MB3-H Borehole; Roma 8 Borehole; Taroom 17 Borehole; West Wandoan 1 Borehole; Woleebee Creek GW4 Borehole	U-shaped burrows	Polychaeta annelids (Axiothella, Abarenicola and Scolecolepis); Sipunculans (Sipunculus); Enteropneustans (Balanoglossus); Echiurans (Urechis).	Diplocraterion parallelum diagram
Helminthopsis	H. isp.	Fodinichnia	Chinchilla 4 Borehole; Condabri MB9-H Borehole; Kenya East GW7 Borehole; Moonie 31 Borehole; Moonie 34 Borehole; Reedy Creek MB3-H Borehole; Roma 8 Borehole; Taroom 17 Borehole; West Wandoan 1 Borehole; Woleebee Creek GW4 Borehole	Simple, unbranched, horizontal cylinder traces	Polychaetes; Priapulids	Example of Helminthopsis fossil
Lockeia	L. amygdaloides; L. isp.	Cubichnia; Domichnia	Chinchilla 4 Borehole; Condabri MB9-H Borehole; Kenya East GW7 Borehole; Moonie 31 Borehole; Moonie 34 Borehole; Reedy Creek MB3-H Borehole; Roma 8 Borehole; Taroom 17 Borehole; West Wandoan 1 Borehole; Woleebee Creek GW4 Borehole	Dwelling traces	Bivalves	
Naktodemasis	N. isp.	Fodinichnia	Chinchilla 4 Borehole; Condabri MB9-H Borehole; Kenya East GW7 Borehole; Moonie 31 Borehole; Moonie 34 Borehole; Reedy Creek MB3-H Borehole; Roma 8 Borehole; Taroom 17 Borehole; West Wandoan 1 Borehole; Woleebee Creek GW4 Borehole	Straight to sinuous, unlined and unbranched burrows	Soil bugs; Cicada nymphs; Scarabaeid beetle larvae	
Palaeophycus	P. tubularis	Domichnia	Chinchilla 4 Borehole; Condabri MB9-H Borehole; Kenya East GW7 Borehole; Moonie 31 Borehole; Moonie 34 Borehole; Reedy Creek MB3-H Borehole; Roma 8 Borehole; Taroom 17 Borehole; West Wandoan 1 Borehole; Woleebee Creek GW4 Borehole	Straight or gently curved tubular burrows.	Polychaetes; Semiaquatic Insects (Orthoptera and Hemiptera); Semiaquatic and non-aquatic Beetles.	Example of Palaeophycus fossil
Phycosiphon	P. isp.	Fodinichnia	Chinchilla 4 Borehole; Condabri MB9-H Borehole; Kenya East GW7 Borehole; Moonie 31 Borehole; Moonie 34 Borehole; Reedy Creek MB3-H Borehole; Roma 8 Borehole; Taroom 17 Borehole; West Wandoan 1 Borehole; Woleebee Creek GW4 Borehole	Irregularly meandering burrows	Vermiform Animals	
Planolites	P. montanus; P. beverleyensis; P. isp.	Pascichnia	Chinchilla 4 Borehole; Condabri MB9-H Borehole; Kenya East GW7 Borehole; Moonie 31 Borehole; Moonie 34 Borehole; Reedy Creek MB3-H Borehole; Roma 8 Borehole; Taroom 17 Borehole; West Wandoan 1 Borehole; Woleebee Creek GW4 Borehole	Cylindrical or elliptical curved/tortuous trace fossils	Polychaetes; Insects	Example of Planolites fossil
Scolicia	S. isp.	Cubichnia	Chinchilla 4 Borehole; Condabri MB9-H Borehole; Kenya East GW7 Borehole; Moonie 31 Borehole; Moonie 34 Borehole; Reedy Creek MB3-H Borehole; Roma 8 Borehole; Taroom 17 Borehole; West Wandoan 1 Borehole; Woleebee Creek GW4 Borehole	Symmetrical trail or burrow	Gastropods	Scolicia trails
Skolithos	S. isp.	Domichnia	Chinchilla 4 Borehole; Condabri MB9-H Borehole; Kenya East GW7 Borehole; Moonie 31 Borehole; Moonie 34 Borehole; Reedy Creek MB3-H Borehole; Roma 8 Borehole; Taroom 17 Borehole; West Wandoan 1 Borehole; Woleebee Creek GW4 Borehole	Cylindrical strands with branches	Polychaetes; Phoronidans	
Siphonichnus	S. ophthalmoides	Domichnia	Chinchilla 4 Borehole; Condabri MB9-H Borehole; Kenya East GW7 Borehole; Moonie 31 Borehole; Moonie 34 Borehole; Reedy Creek MB3-H Borehole; Roma 8 Borehole; Taroom 17 Borehole; West Wandoan 1 Borehole; Woleebee Creek GW4 Borehole	Cylindrical strands with branches	Polychaetes; Phoronidans	
Taenidium	T. serpentinum; T. isp.	Fodinichnia	Chinchilla 4 Borehole; Condabri MB9-H Borehole; Kenya East GW7 Borehole; Moonie 31 Borehole; Moonie 34 Borehole; Reedy Creek MB3-H Borehole; Roma 8 Borehole; Taroom 17 Borehole; West Wandoan 1 Borehole; Woleebee Creek GW4 Borehole	Unlined meniscate burrows	Deposit-feeding Sipuncula; Polychaetes; Phoronidans	
Thalassinoides	T. isp.	Tubular Fodinichnia	Chinchilla 4 Borehole; Condabri MB9-H Borehole; Kenya East GW7 Borehole; Moonie 31 Borehole; Moonie 34 Borehole; Reedy Creek MB3-H Borehole; Roma 8 Borehole; Taroom 17 Borehole; West Wandoan 1 Borehole; Woleebee Creek GW4 Borehole	Tubular Burrows	Thalassinidea; Several Crustaceans (Anomura, Decapoda); Annelids (Polychaeta; Sipuncula; Dipnoi	Thalassinoides burrowing structures, with modern related fauna, showing the ecological convergence and the variety of animals that left this Ichnogenus.
Teichichnus	T. isp.	Fodinichnia	Chinchilla 4 Borehole; Condabri MB9-H Borehole; Kenya East GW7 Borehole; Moonie 31 Borehole; Moonie 34 Borehole; Reedy Creek MB3-H Borehole; Roma 8 Borehole; Taroom 17 Borehole; West Wandoan 1 Borehole; Woleebee Creek GW4 Borehole	Vertical to oblique, unbranched or branched, elongated to arcuate spreite burrow	Polychaetes; Dwelling Echiurans; Dwelling Holothurians.	Teichichnus burrows

=== Diplopoda ===
Genus	Species	Location	Stratigraphic position	Material	Notes	Images
Decorotergum	D. warrenae	Kolane Station, 58 km ENE of Taroom	Westgrove Ironstone Member	Incomplete specimens: QMF12294, QMF12295 and one small fragment of a third specimen, QMF12296	A millipede whose affinities are controversial. It may be an Oniscomorpha of the order Amynilyspedida family Amynilyspedidae or a member of the order Polydesmida	Extant example of the order Amynilyspedida, Glomeris

=== Vertebrata ===
Genus	Species	Location	Stratigraphic position	Material	Notes	Images
Plesiosauria	Indeterminate	Kolane Station, 58 km ENE of Taroom	Westgrove Ironstone Member	QM F10440, Limb, girdle and vertebral fragments from a single skeleton; QM F10441, partial skeleton	A Freshwater Plesiosaur with affinities with Pliosauridae and Neoplesiosauria	
Siderops	S. kehli	Kolane Station, 58 km ENE of Taroom	Westgrove Ironstone Member	QM F7822, nearly complete skull with mandible and postcrania	A gigantic chigutisaurid temnospondyl, representing a relictual genus isolated in the Australian Ecoregion, as well one of the largest Mesozoic amphibians	Restoration of Siderops kehli

=== Phytoplankton ===
Genus	Species	Stratigraphic position	Material	Notes	Images
Chomotriletes	C. triangularis	GSQ Mundubera Borehole	Spores	Affinities with the family Zygnemataceae. A genus derived from freshwater filamentous or unicellular, uniseriate (unbranched) green algae.	

=== Bryophyta ===
Genus	Species	Stratigraphic position	Material	Notes	Images
Anapiculatisporites	A. dawsonensis; A. pristidentatus	GSQ Mundubera Borehole	Spores	Incertae sedis; affinities with Bryophyta.	
Cingutriletes	C. clavus; C. parvus	GSQ Mundubera Borehole	Spores	Incertae sedis; affinities with Bryophyta.	
Distalanulisporites	D. punctus; D. verrucosus	GSQ Mundubera Borehole	Spores	Affinities with the family Sphagnaceae in the Sphagnopsida.	
Foraminisporis	F. spp.	Chinchilla 4 Borehole; Condabri MB9-H Borehole; Kenya East GW7 Borehole; Moonie 31 Borehole; Reedy Creek MB3-H Borehole; Roma 8 Borehole; Taroom 17 Borehole; West Wandoan 1 Borehole; Woleebee Creek GW4 Borehole	Spores	Affinities with the family Notothyladaceae in the Anthocerotopsida.	
Nevesisporites	N. vallatus	Boxvale Area; Chinchilla 4 Borehole; Condabri MB9-H Borehole; GSQ Mundubera Borehole; Kenya East GW7 Borehole; Moonie 31 Borehole; Reedy Creek MB3-H Borehole; Roma 8 Borehole; Taroom 17 Borehole; West Wandoan 1 Borehole	Spores	Incertae sedis; affinities with Bryophyta. This spore is found in Jurassic sediments associated with the polar regions.	
Polycingulatisporites	P. crenulatus; P. densatus; P. mooniensis; P. triangularis; P. tortuosus	Boxvale Area; Chinchilla 4 Borehole; Condabri MB9-H Borehole; GSQ Mundubera Borehole; Kenya East GW7 Borehole; Moonie 31 Borehole; Reedy Creek MB3-H Borehole; Roma 8 Borehole; Taroom 17 Borehole; West Wandoan 1 Borehole; Woleebee Creek GW4 Borehole	Spores	Affinities with the family Notothyladaceae in the Anthocerotopsida. Hornwort spores.	Extant Notothylas specimens
Rogalskaisporites	R. cicatricosus; R. multicicatricosus	GSQ Mundubera Borehole	Spores	Affinities with the family Sphagnaceae in the Sphagnopsida.	
Stereisporites	S. antiquasporites; S. radiatus	Boxvale Area; GSQ Mundubera Borehole	Spores	Affinities with the family Sphagnaceae in the Sphagnopsida. "Peat moss" spores, related to genera such as Sphagnum that can store large amounts of water.	Extant Sphagnum specimens
Staplinisporites	S. caminus; S. manifestus; S. pocockii	Boxvale Area; GSQ Mundubera Borehole	Spores	Affinities with the family Encalyptaceae in the Bryopsida. Branching moss spores, indicating high water-depleting environments.	Extant Encalypta specimens; Staplinisporites probably come from similar genera

=== Lycophyta ===
Genus	Species	Stratigraphic position	Material	Notes	Images
Antulsporites	A. granulatus; A. saevus; A. varigranulatus; A. spp.	GSQ Mundubera Borehole	Spores	Affinities with the Selaginellaceae in the Lycopsida.	
Apiculatisporis	A. spp.	GSQ Mundubera Borehole	Spores	Incertae sedis; affinities with Lycopodiopsida	
Cadargasporites	C. baculatus; C. granulatus; C. reticulatus	Boxvale Area; Chinchilla 4 Borehole; Condabri MB9-H Borehole; GSQ Mundubera Borehole; Kenya East GW7 Borehole; Moonie 31 Borehole; Reedy Creek MB3-H Borehole; Roma 8 Borehole; Taroom 17 Borehole; West Wandoan 1 Borehole; Woleebee Creek GW4 Borehole	Spores	Affinities with the Selaginellaceae in the Lycopsida. Herbaceous lycophyte flora, similar to ferns, found in humid settings. This family of spores are also the most diverse in the formation.	Extant Selaginella, typical example of Selaginellaceae
Camarozonosporites	C. clivosus; C. ramosus; C. rudis; C. spp.	Boxvale Area; Chinchilla 4 Borehole; Condabri MB9-H Borehole; GSQ Mundubera Borehole; Kenya East GW7 Borehole; Moonie 31 Borehole; Reedy Creek MB3-H Borehole; Roma 8 Borehole; Taroom 17 Borehole; West Wandoan 1 Borehole; Woleebee Creek GW4 Borehole	Spores	Affinities with the family Lycopodiaceae in the Lycopodiopsida. Lycopod spores, related to herbaceous to arbustive flora common in humid environments.	
Dictyotosporites	D. sandrana	GSQ DRD 22	Spores	Incertae sedis; affinities with Lycopodiopsida.	
Lycopodiumsporites	L. austroclavatidites; L. circolumenus; L. rosewoodensis; L. semimuris; L. triangularis	Boxvale Area; GSQ Mundubera Borehole	Spores	Affinities with the family Lycopodiaceae in the Lycopodiopsida. Lycopod spores, related to herbaceous to arbustive flora common in humid environments.	Extant Lycopodium specimens
Neoraistrickia	N. elongata; N. suratensis; N. truncata; N. spp.	GSQ Mundubera Borehole	Spores	Affinities with the Selaginellaceae in the Lycopsida.	
Punctatosporites	P. walkomii	Boxvale Area	Spores	Incertae sedis; affinities with Lycopodiopsida.	
Retitriletes	R. austroclavatidites; R. huttonensis; R. rosewoodensis; R. semimurus	GSQ Mundubera Borehole	Spores	Affinities with the family Lycopodiaceae in the Lycopodiopsida.	
Lycopodiumsporites	S. pseudoalveolatus	GSQ Mundubera Borehole	Spores	Affinities with the family Lycopodiaceae in the Lycopodiopsida. Lycopod spores, related to herbaceous to arbustive flora common in humid environments.	
Uvaesporites	U. verrucosus	GSQ Mundubera Borehole	Spores	Affinities with the Selaginellaceae in the Lycopsida.	

=== Pteridophyta ===
Genus	Species	Stratigraphic position	Material	Notes	Images
Annulispora	A. altmarkensis; A. badia; A. densata; A. folliculosa; A. microannulata; A. radiata; A. triangularis; A. spp.	Boxvale area; GSQ Mundubera Borehole	Spores	Affinities with the genus Saccoloma, type representative of the family Saccolomataceae. This fern spore resembles those of the living genus Saccoloma, being probably from a pantropical genus found in wet, shaded forest areas.	Extant Saccoloma specimens; Annulispora probably comes from similar genera or maybe a species in the genus
Baculatisporites	B. comaumensis	Boxvale area; GSQ Mundubera Borehole	Spores	Affinities with the family Osmundaceae in the Polypodiopsida. Near fluvial current ferns, related to the modern Osmunda regalis.	Extant Osmunda specimens; Baculatisporites and Todisporites probably come from similar genera or maybe a species from the genus
Biretisporites	B. modestus	GSQ Mundubera Borehole	Spores	Affinities with the Marattiaceae in the Polypodiopsida. Fern spores from low herbaceous flora.	
Cingulatisporites	C. caminus	GSQ Mundubera Borehole	Spores	Incertae sedis; affinities with the Pteridophyta	
Clavatisporites	C. hammenii	GSQ Mundubera Borehole	Spores	Incertae sedis; affinities with the Pteridophyta	
Cyathidites	C. australis; C. minor	GSQ Mundubera Borehole	Spores	Affinities with the family Cyatheaceae in the Cyatheales. Arboreal fern spores.	Extant Cyathea
Dictyophyllidites	D. mortoni	Boxvale area	Spores	Affinities with the family Matoniaceae in the Gleicheniales.	
Duplexisporites	D. problematicus; D. spp.	GSQ Mundubera Borehole	Spores	Incertae sedis; affinities with the Pteridophyta	
Foveosporites	F. moretonensis	GSQ Mundubera Borehole	Spores	Incertae sedis; affinities with the Pteridophyta	
Gleicheniidites	G. senonicus; G. spp.	Boxvale area; GSQ Mundubera Borehole	Spores	Affinities with the Gleicheniales in the Polypodiopsida. Fern spores from low herbaceous flora.	Extant Gleichenia specimens; Gleicheniidites probably come from similar genera or maybe a species in the genus
Granulatisporites	G. spp.	GSQ Mundubera Borehole	Spores	Affinities with the Pteridaceae in the Polypodiopsida. Forest ferns from humid ground locations.	Extant Pityrogramma specimens
Heliosporites	H. spp	GSQ Mundubera Borehole	Spores	Incertae sedis; affinities with the Pteridophyta	
Ischyosporites	I. marburgensis; I. surangulus	Boxvale area; GSQ Mundubera Borehole	Spores	Incertae sedis; affinities with the Pteridophyta	
Leiotriletes	L. directus; L. magnus	GSQ Mundubera Borehole	Spores	Incertae sedis; affinities with the Pteridophyta	
Leptolepidites	L. major; L. verrucatus	GSQ Mundubera Borehole	Spores	Affinities with the family Dennstaedtiaceae in the Polypodiales. Forest fern spores.	Extant Dennstaedtia specimens; Leptolepidites probably comes from similar genera
Matonisporites	M. spp	Boxvale area; GSQ Mundubera Borehole	Spores	Affinities with the family Matoniaceae in the Gleicheniales.	
Osmundacidites	O. wellmanii	GSQ Mundubera Borehole	Spores	Affinities with the family Osmundaceae in the Polypodiopsida. Near fluvial current ferns, related to the modern Osmunda regalis.	
Peroaletes	P. rugosus	GSQ Mundubera Borehole	Spores	Incertae sedis; affinities with the Pteridophyta	
Perotrilites	P. tenuis	GSQ Mundubera Borehole	Spores	Incertae sedis; affinities with the Pteridophyta	
Polypodiisporites	P. ipsviciensis	GSQ Mundubera Borehole	Spores	Affinities with the family Dennstaedtiaceae in the Polypodiales. Forest fern spores.	
Rugulatisporites	R. ramosus; R. spp.	GSQ Mundubera Borehole	Spores	Affinities with the family Osmundaceae in the Polypodiopsida. Near fluvial current ferns, related to the modern Osmunda regalis.	

=== Peltaspermales ===
Genus	Species	Stratigraphic position	Material	Notes	Images
Alisporites	A. australis; A. lowoodensis; A. similis	Boxvale Area	Pollen	Affinities with the families Peltaspermaceae, Corystospermaceae or Umkomasiaceae in the Peltaspermales. Pollen of uncertain provenance that can be derived from any of the members of the Peltaspermales. The lack of distinctive characters and poor conservation make this pollen difficult to classify. Arboreal to arbustive seed ferns.	
Kekryphalospora	K. distincta	Chinchilla 4 Borehole; Condabri MB9-H Borehole; Kenya East GW7 Borehole; Moonie 31 Borehole; Reedy Creek MB3-H Borehole; Roma 8 Borehole; Taroom 17 Borehole; West Wandoan 1 Borehole; Woleebee Creek GW4 Borehole	Pollen	Affinities with the families Peltaspermaceae, Corystospermaceae or Umkomasiaceae in the Peltaspermales. Extremely abundant	
Vitreisporites	V. contectus; V. pallidus	Boxvale Area; GSQ Mundubera Borehole	Pollen	From the family Caytoniaceae in the Caytoniales. Caytoniaceae are a complex group of Mesozoic fossil floras that may be related to both Peltaspermales and Ginkgoaceae.	

=== Cycadophyta ===
Genus	Species	Stratigraphic position	Material	Notes	Images
Cycadopites	C. crassimarginis; C. granulatus; C. infirmus; C. nitidus	GSQ Mundubera Borehole	Pollen	Affinities with the family Cycadaceae in the Cycadales or with Cycadaceae and Bennettitaceae. It has been found associated with the Bennetite pollen cone Bennettistemon	Extant Cycas platyphylla

=== Conifers ===
Genus	Species	Stratigraphic position	Material	Notes	Images
Araucariacites	A. australis; A. fissus	Chinchilla 4 Borehole; GSQ Mundubera Borehole	Pollen	Affinities with the family Araucariaceae in the Pinales. Conifer pollen from medium to large arboreal plants.	Extant Araucaria. Callialasporites may come from a related plant
Callialasporites	C. dampierii; C. turbatus; C. propinquivellersis	Chinchilla 4 Borehole; Kenya East GW7 Borehole; GSQ DRD 24	Pollen	Affinities with the family Araucariaceae in the Pinales. Conifer pollen from medium to large arboreal plants.	
Classopollis	C. classoides; C. meyeriana; C. simplex; C. spp.	Boxvale Area; Chinchilla 4 Borehole; Condabri MB9-H Borehole; GSQ Mundubera Borehole; Kenya East GW7 Borehole; Moonie 31 Borehole; Reedy Creek MB3-H Borehole; Roma 8 Borehole; Taroom 17 Borehole; West Wandoan 1 Borehole; Woleebee Creek GW4 Borehole	Pollen	Affinities with the Hirmeriellaceae in the Pinopsida.	
Inaperturopollenites	I. turbatus; I. spp.	Boxvale Area; GSQ Mundubera Borehole	Pollen	Affinities with the Pinidae inside Coniferae.	Extant Pinus cembra Cone, example of the Pinidae. Inaperturopollenites is similar to the pollen found on this genus
Indusiisporites	I. parvisaccatus	Boxvale Area; GSQ Mundubera Borehole	Pollen	Affinities with the family Podocarpaceae inside Coniferae.	
Perinopollenites	P. elatoides	Boxvale Area; Chinchilla 4 Borehole; Condabri MB9-H Borehole; GSQ Mundubera Borehole; Kenya East GW7 Borehole; Moonie 31 Borehole; Reedy Creek MB3-H Borehole; Roma 8 Borehole; Taroom 17 Borehole; West Wandoan 1 Borehole; Woleebee Creek GW4 Borehole	Pollen	Affinities with the family Cupressaceae in the Pinopsida. Pollen that resembles that of extant genera such as the genus Actinostrobus and Austrocedrus, probably derived from dry environments.	Extant Austrocedrus
Podocarpidites	P. ellipticus	GSQ Mundubera Borehole	Pollen	Affinities with the family Podocarpaceae. Pollen from diverse types of Podocarpaceous conifers, that include morphotypes similar to the low arbustive Microcachrys and the medium arbustive Lepidothamnus, likely linked with Upland settings	Extant Microcachrys
Podosporites	P. spp.	Boxvale Area; GSQ Mundubera Borehole	Pollen	Affinities with the family Podocarpaceae.	
Trisaccites	T. variabilis	GSQ Mundubera Borehole	Pollen	Affinities with the family Podocarpaceae.	
Zonalapollenites	Z. dampieri; Z. segmentatus; Z. trilobatus	Boxvale Area; GSQ Mundubera Borehole	Pollen	Affinities with the family Pinaceae in the Pinopsida. Conifer pollen from medium to large arboreal plants.	Extant Picea.
