= Precipice Sandstone =

Geologic formation in Australia

- Stratigraphic range: Sinemurian to early Pliensbachian; ~199–187 Ma
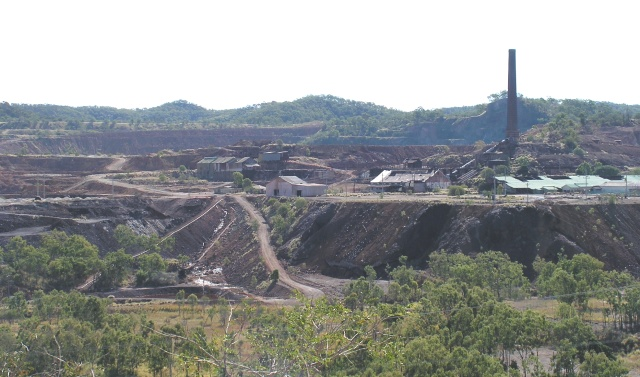
- Mount Morgan Mine, where strata of the formation was exposed
- Type: Geological formation
- Unit of: Bundamba Group
- Sub-units: Lower Member; Upper Member
- Underlies: Evergreen Formation
- Overlies: Basement; Moolayember Formation
- Thickness: 175 m (574 ft)

Lithology
- Primary: Sandstone
- Other: Siltstone, mudstone

Location
- Coordinates: 24.3°S 150.5°E
- Approximate paleocoordinates: 58.6°S 92.4°E
- Region: Queensland, New South Wales
- Country: Australia
- Extent: Surat Basin

Type section
- Named for: Sandstone cliffs in the gorge of Precipice Creek, a tributary of the Dawson River
- Named by: Whitehouse
- Precipice Sandstone (Australia)

The Precipice Sandstone an Early Jurassic (Sinemurian to early Pliensbachian, with possible Hettangian levels) geologic formation of the Surat Basin in New South Wales and Queensland, eastern Australia, know due to the presence of abundant vertebrate remains & tracks. This unit includes the previously described Razorback beds. This unit represents a major, almost primary, source of hydrocarbons in the region, with a Potential CO_{2} reservoir of up to 70m. It was deposited on top of older sediments, like Bowen Basin units, in an unconformable manner, resting along the eastern basin margin and the Back Creek Group in the southern Comet Platform, while in other areas it directly overlies the Triassic Moolayember Formation & Callide Coal Measures, being deposited in a comparatively stable basin. Isopach maps of the Precipice Sandstone indicate two distinct areas of sediment accumulation, suggesting two separate depocentres filled from different source regions during the Sinemurian, with the Thomson orogeny and New England Orogen hinterlands as possible ones. This unit represented a fluvial-palustrine-lacustrine braided channel north-flowing succession, that seem to have debouch into a shallow restricted tidal/wave influenced marine embayment, marked at areas like Woleebee Creek. Paleoenvironment-wise, it represents a hinterland rich in vegetation, hinting at wet environments like swamps, where agglutinated foraminifera suggests marine flooding and drier conditions or the encroachment of seawater onto coastal areas.

== Fireclay Caverns ==
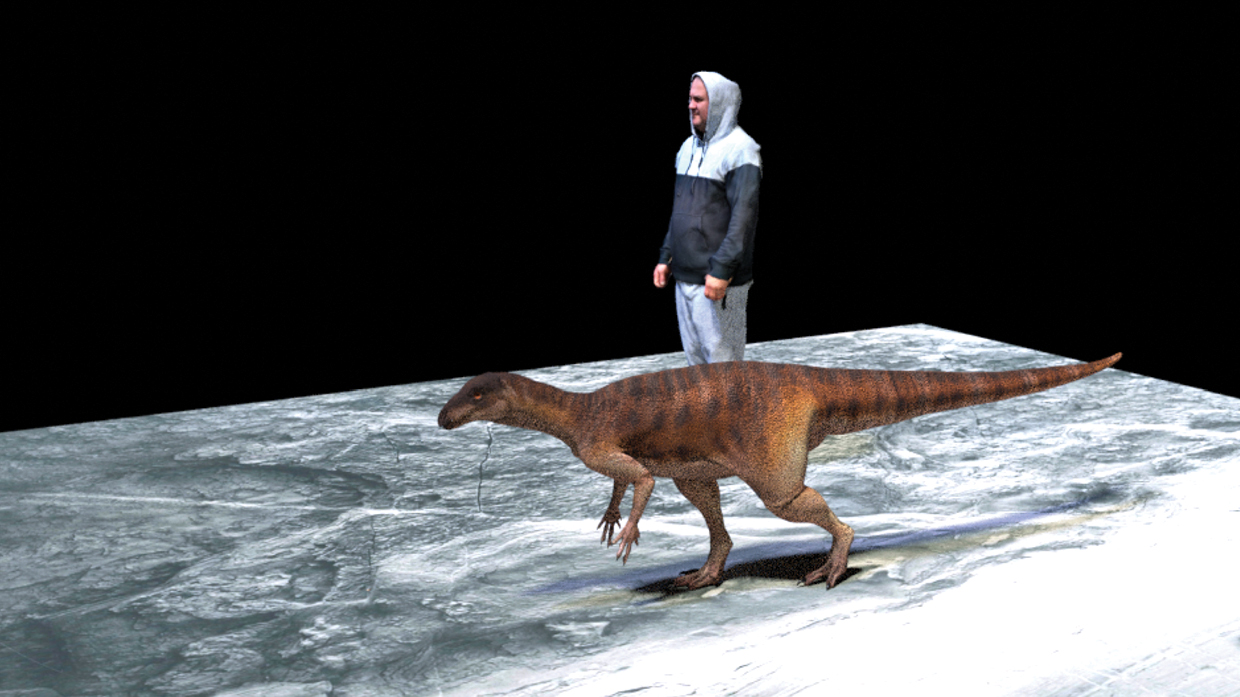
Fireclay Caverns' Site A1 trackmaker (Mount Morgan, Queensland) placed in its footprints to scale with a 1.75 m tall human.

The Fireclay Caverns were excavated by the Mount Morgan Mine to provide clay for its brickworks resulting in very large openings that measure between 4–12 metres in height from the cave floor. Excavation of the caverns ceased when the mine brickworks were decommissioned in the early 1900s. Erosion revealed dinosaur footprints (preserved as infills) being discovered in 1954. To date, nine different ceiling sections of the Fireclay Caverns have been recognised as containing dinosaur footprints. These have been dated to the Early Jurassic (Sinemurian) ~195 million years ago. Walkways and stairs had been constructed in 2010 to provide access to the dinosaur footprints as part of the mine site tours. The site was closed to access in 2011 due to ceiling erosion posing a significant risk to public safety.

The Fireclay Caverns were excavated to supply clay to brickworks of the Mount Morgan Mine. Clay was mined from within the caverns by pick and shovel, then transferred by underground rail to a brickworks lower in the Mount Morgan Mine site. Excavation from the caverns ceased when their clay was no longer required by the mine. After cavern excavations ceased, clay progressively fell from the cavern ceilings, revealing rock ceilings above. In 1954, HRE Staines, a Mount Morgan Limited geologist, identified dinosaur footprints in the rock ceilings. Over 300 such footprints have been identified on the cavern ceilings dated to the Early Jurassic (Sinemurian) ~195 million years ago. 2024 represents the 70th anniversary of when Ross Staines published Australia's first dinosaur trackway-consisting of four footprints. To celebrate, previously unpublished archival photographs (c. 1954) enabled a re-examination of Staines' original trackway, from which two additional footprints were revealed. Analyses indicated the trackmaker exhibited a walking gait, initially walking at ~3.8 km/h and then slowed to 1.8 km/h in association with a slight turn in direction.

After cavern excavations ceased, a colony of bent-wing bats began inhabiting the caverns. The sections of the caverns containing the bats are inaccessible to protect the bat habitat.

== Biota ==
=== Invertebrates ===
Genus	Species	Type	Location	Material	Origin	Notes	Images
Asterosoma	A. isp.	Fodinichnia	Chinchilla 4 Borehole; Condabri MB9-H Borehole; Kenya East GW7 Borehole; Moonie 31 Borehole; Moonie 34 Borehole; Reedy Creek MB3-H Borehole; Roma 8 Borehole; Taroom 17 Borehole; West Wandoan 1 Borehole; Woleebee Creek GW4 Borehole	Radiating bulb-like swelling burrows	Annelid worm, vermiform organism	Freshwater/brackish burrow-like ichnofossils	
Conichnus	C. isp.	Domichnia; Cubichnia	Chinchilla 4 Borehole; Condabri MB9-H Borehole; Kenya East GW7 Borehole; Moonie 31 Borehole; Moonie 34 Borehole; Reedy Creek MB3-H Borehole; Roma 8 Borehole; Taroom 17 Borehole; West Wandoan 1 Borehole; Woleebee Creek GW4 Borehole	trails	Gastropods	Freshwater/brackish fillings-like ichnofossils	
Cylindrichnus	C. isp.	Domichnia	Chinchilla 4 Borehole; Condabri MB9-H Borehole; Kenya East GW7 Borehole; Moonie 31 Borehole; Moonie 34 Borehole; Reedy Creek MB3-H Borehole; Roma 8 Borehole; Taroom 17 Borehole; West Wandoan 1 Borehole; Woleebee Creek GW4 Borehole	Long, subconical, weakly curved burrows	Anemones; Polychaete worms	Freshwater/brackish burrow-like ichnofossils	
Diplocraterion	D. parallelum	Domichnia	Chinchilla 4 Borehole; Condabri MB9-H Borehole; Kenya East GW7 Borehole; Moonie 31 Borehole; Moonie 34 Borehole; Reedy Creek MB3-H Borehole; Roma 8 Borehole; Taroom 17 Borehole; West Wandoan 1 Borehole; Woleebee Creek GW4 Borehole	U-shaped burrows	Polychaeta annelids (Axiothella, Abarenicola and Scolecolepis); Sipunculans (Sipunculus); Enteropneustans (Balanoglossus); Echiurans (Urechis).	Vertical, U-shaped, single-spreite Burrows; unidirectional or bidirectional spreite, generally continuous, rarely discontinuous. Most Diplocraterion show only protrusive spreiten, like the local ones, produced under predominantly erosive conditions where the organism was constantly burrowing deeper into the substrate as sediment was eroded from the top.	Diplocraterion parallelum diagram
Helminthopsis	H. isp.	Fodinichnia	Chinchilla 4 Borehole; Condabri MB9-H Borehole; Kenya East GW7 Borehole; Moonie 31 Borehole; Moonie 34 Borehole; Reedy Creek MB3-H Borehole; Roma 8 Borehole; Taroom 17 Borehole; West Wandoan 1 Borehole; Woleebee Creek GW4 Borehole	Simple, unbranched, horizontal cylinder traces	Polychaetes; Priapulids	Saltwater/brackish burrow-like ichnofossils.	Example of Helminthopsis fossil
Lockeia	L. amygdaloides; L. isp.	Cubichnia; Domichnia	Chinchilla 4 Borehole; Condabri MB9-H Borehole; Kenya East GW7 Borehole; Moonie 31 Borehole; Moonie 34 Borehole; Reedy Creek MB3-H Borehole; Roma 8 Borehole; Taroom 17 Borehole; West Wandoan 1 Borehole; Woleebee Creek GW4 Borehole	Dwelling traces	Bivalves	Marine, brackish or freshwater resting traces of Bivalves.	
Naktodemasis	N. isp.	Fodinichnia	Chinchilla 4 Borehole; Condabri MB9-H Borehole; Kenya East GW7 Borehole; Moonie 31 Borehole; Moonie 34 Borehole; Reedy Creek MB3-H Borehole; Roma 8 Borehole; Taroom 17 Borehole; West Wandoan 1 Borehole; Woleebee Creek GW4 Borehole	Straight to sinuous, unlined and unbranched burrows	Soil bugs; Cicada nymphs; Scarabaeid beetle larvae	Freshwater/Terrestrial burrow-like ichnofossils.	
Palaeophycus	P. tubularis	Domichnia	Chinchilla 4 Borehole; Condabri MB9-H Borehole; Kenya East GW7 Borehole; Moonie 31 Borehole; Moonie 34 Borehole; Reedy Creek MB3-H Borehole; Roma 8 Borehole; Taroom 17 Borehole; West Wandoan 1 Borehole; Woleebee Creek GW4 Borehole	Straight or gently curved tubular burrows.	Polychaetes; Semiaquatic Insects (Orthoptera and Hemiptera); Semiaquatic and non-aquatic Beetles.	Freshwater/brackish burrow-like ichnofossils.	Example of Palaeophycus fossil
Phycosiphon	P. isp.	Fodinichnia	Chinchilla 4 Borehole; Condabri MB9-H Borehole; Kenya East GW7 Borehole; Moonie 31 Borehole; Moonie 34 Borehole; Reedy Creek MB3-H Borehole; Roma 8 Borehole; Taroom 17 Borehole; West Wandoan 1 Borehole; Woleebee Creek GW4 Borehole	Irregularly meandering burrows	Vermiform Animals	Freshwater burrow-like ichnofossils.	
Planolites	P. montanus; P. beverleyensis; P. isp.	Pascichnia	Chinchilla 4 Borehole; Condabri MB9-H Borehole; Kenya East GW7 Borehole; Moonie 31 Borehole; Moonie 34 Borehole; Reedy Creek MB3-H Borehole; Roma 8 Borehole; Taroom 17 Borehole; West Wandoan 1 Borehole; Woleebee Creek GW4 Borehole	Cylindrical or elliptical curved/tortuous trace fossils	Polychaetes; Insects	Freshwater/brackish burrow-like ichnofossils. Planolites is really common in all types of the Ciechocinek Formation deposits. It is referred to vermiform deposit-feeders, mainly Polychaetes, producing active Fodinichnia. It is controversial, since is considered a strictly a junior synonym of Palaeophycus.	Example of Planolites fossil
Scolicia	S. isp.	Cubichnia	Chinchilla 4 Borehole; Condabri MB9-H Borehole; Kenya East GW7 Borehole; Moonie 31 Borehole; Moonie 34 Borehole; Reedy Creek MB3-H Borehole; Roma 8 Borehole; Taroom 17 Borehole; West Wandoan 1 Borehole; Woleebee Creek GW4 Borehole	Symmetrical trail or burrow	Gastropods	Freshwater/brackish trail-like ichnofossils	Scolicia trails
Skolithos	S. isp.	Domichnia	Chinchilla 4 Borehole; Condabri MB9-H Borehole; Kenya East GW7 Borehole; Moonie 31 Borehole; Moonie 34 Borehole; Reedy Creek MB3-H Borehole; Roma 8 Borehole; Taroom 17 Borehole; West Wandoan 1 Borehole; Woleebee Creek GW4 Borehole	Cylindrical strands with branches	Polychaetes; Phoronidans	Brackish trace ichnofossils. Interpreted as dwelling structures of vermiform animals, more concretely the Domichnion of a suspension-feeding Worm or Phoronidan.	
Siphonichnus	S. ophthalmoides	Domichnia	Chinchilla 4 Borehole; Condabri MB9-H Borehole; Kenya East GW7 Borehole; Moonie 31 Borehole; Moonie 34 Borehole; Reedy Creek MB3-H Borehole; Roma 8 Borehole; Taroom 17 Borehole; West Wandoan 1 Borehole; Woleebee Creek GW4 Borehole	Cylindrical strands with branches	Polychaetes; Phoronidans	Brackish trace ichnofossils. Interpreted as dwelling structures of vermiform animals, more concretely the Domichnion of a suspension-feeding Worm or Phoronidan.	
Taenidium	T. serpentinum; T. isp.	Fodinichnia	Chinchilla 4 Borehole; Condabri MB9-H Borehole; Kenya East GW7 Borehole; Moonie 31 Borehole; Moonie 34 Borehole; Reedy Creek MB3-H Borehole; Roma 8 Borehole; Taroom 17 Borehole; West Wandoan 1 Borehole; Woleebee Creek GW4 Borehole	Unlined meniscate burrows	Deposit-feeding Sipuncula; Polychaetes; Phoronidans	Freshwater/Blackish burrow-like ichnofossils. Taenidium is a meniscate backfill structure, usually considered to be produced by an animal progressing axially through the sediment and depositing alternating packets of differently constituted sediment behind it as it moves forward.	
Thalassinoides	T. isp.	Tubular Fodinichnia	Chinchilla 4 Borehole; Condabri MB9-H Borehole; Kenya East GW7 Borehole; Moonie 31 Borehole; Moonie 34 Borehole; Reedy Creek MB3-H Borehole; Roma 8 Borehole; Taroom 17 Borehole; West Wandoan 1 Borehole; Woleebee Creek GW4 Borehole	Tubular Burrows	Thalassinidea; Several Crustaceans (Anomura, Decapoda); Annelids (Polychaeta; Sipuncula; Dipnoi	Burrow-like ichnofossils. Large burrow-systems consisting of smooth-walled, essentially cylindrical components. Common sedimentary features are Thalassinoides trace fossils in the fissile marlstone to claystone intervals	Thalassinoides burrowing structures, with modern related fauna, showing the ecological convergence and the variety of animals that left this Ichnogenus.
Teichichnus	T. isp.	Fodinichnia	Chinchilla 4 Borehole; Condabri MB9-H Borehole; Kenya East GW7 Borehole; Moonie 31 Borehole; Moonie 34 Borehole; Reedy Creek MB3-H Borehole; Roma 8 Borehole; Taroom 17 Borehole; West Wandoan 1 Borehole; Woleebee Creek GW4 Borehole	Vertical to oblique, unbranched or branched, elongated to arcuate spreite burrow	Polychaetes; Dwelling Echiurans; Dwelling Holothurians.	Saltwater/brackish burrow-like ichnofossils. The overall morphology and details of the burrows, in comparison with modern analogues and neoichnological experiments, suggest Echiurans (spoon worms) or Holothurians (sea cucumbers) with a combined suspension- and deposit-feeding behaviour as potential producers.	Teichichnus burrows

=== Vertebrata ===
Genus	Species	Location	Stratigraphic position	Material	Notes	Images
Anomoepodidae	Indeterminate	Biloela	Lower Member	Footprints	ornithischian footprints, unassigned to any concrete ichnogenus, but with resemblance with Anomoepodidae	Small ornithischians similar to Lesothosaurus may have left these footprints
Anomoepus	A. scambus; A. ispp.	Callide Basin; Carnarvon Gorge; Fireclay Caverns; Mount Morgan	Lower Member	Footprints	Ornithischian Footprints, originally suggested as quadrupedal theropod tracks, latter identified as of Ornithischian origin. Up to 130 tracks & 4 short trackways are known.	
Eubrontes	E. isp.	Fireclay Caverns	Lower Member	Footprints	Medium-sized Theropod Footprints. Currently represent the largest of the prints at Mount Morgan	
Grallator	G. isp.	Fireclay Caverns	Lower Member	Footprints	Small-sized Theropod Footprints	
Plesiosauria	Indeterminate	Mount Morgan	Razorback Beds	QM F3983-QM F5500, single disarticulated skeleton preserved as natural moulds	A Freshwater Plesiosaur that cannot be confidently attributed to any particular plesiosaurian clade	
Steropoides	S?. isp	Biloela tracksite	Lower Member	Footprints	Small-sized Ornithischian Footprints	
Theropodipedia	Indeterminate	Callide Mine; Mount Morgan	Lower Member	Footprints	Possible theropod footprints, unassigned to any concrete ichnogenus. One morphotype includes large tridactyl prints, up to 24 cm.	Small theropods similar to Procompsognathus may have left these footprints
Theropodipedia	"Indet. 2"	Fireclay Caverns	Lower Member	Footprints	Possible theropod footprints, unassigned to any concrete ichnogenus. One morphotype includes large tridactyl prints, up to 24 cm.	Small theropods similar to Procompsognathus may have left these footprints
Theropodipedia	"Indet. 3"	Fireclay Caverns	Lower Member	Footprints	Possible theropod footprints, unassigned to any concrete ichnogenus. One morphotype includes large tridactyl prints, up to 24 cm.	Small theropods similar to Procompsognathus may have left these footprints
Wintonopus	W. isp.	Fireclay Caverns	Lower Member	Footprints	Small-sized Ornithischian Footprints	

=== Bryophyta ===
Genus	Species	Stratigraphic position	Material	Notes	Images
Annulispora	A. folliculosa; A. microannulata	Razorback Beds	Spores	Incertae sedis; affinities with Bryophyta.	
Cingutriletes	C. spp.	Razorback Beds	Spores	Incertae sedis; affinities with Bryophyta.	
Distalanulisporites	D. punctus; D. verrucosus	Razorback Beds	Spores	Affinities with the family Sphagnaceae in the Sphagnopsida.	
Foraminisporis	F. spp.	Razorback Beds	Spores	Affinities with the family Notothyladaceae in the Anthocerotopsida.	
Nevesisporites	N. vallatus	Razorback Beds	Spores	Incertae sedis; affinities with Bryophyta. This spore is found in Jurassic sediments associated with the polar regions.	
Polycingulatisporites	P. crenulatus; P. densatus; P. mooniensis	Razorback Beds	Spores	Affinities with the family Notothyladaceae in the Anthocerotopsida. Hornwort spores.	Extant Notothylas specimens
Stereisporites	S. antiquasporites; S. perforatus	Razorback Beds	Spores	Affinities with the family Sphagnaceae in the Sphagnopsida. "Peat moss" spores, related to genera such as Sphagnum that can store large amounts of water.	Extant Sphagnum specimens

=== Lycophyta ===
Genus	Species	Stratigraphic position	Material	Notes	Images
Apiculatisporis	A. spp.	Razorback Beds	Spores	Incertae sedis; affinities with Lycopodiopsida	
Lycopodiumsporites	L. austroclavatidites; L. rosewoodensis	Razorback Beds	Spores	Affinities with the family Lycopodiaceae in the Lycopodiopsida. Lycopod spores, related to herbaceous to arbustive flora common in humid environments.	Extant Lycopodium specimens
Neoraistrickia	N. truncata; N. spp.	Razorback Beds	Spores	Affinities with the Selaginellaceae in the Lycopsida.	

=== Pteridophyta ===
Genus	Species	Stratigraphic position	Material	Notes	Images
Calamospora	C. spp.	Razorback Beds	Spores	Affinities with the Calamitaceae in the Equisetales. Horsetails are herbaceous flora found in humid environments and are flooding-tolerant. In the sections of the formation such as Korsodde, this genus has small peaks in abundance in the layers where more Equisetites stems are found.	Reconstruction of the genus Calamites, found associated with Calamospora

=== Pteridophyta ===
Genus	Species	Stratigraphic position	Material	Notes	Images
Annulispora	A. microannulata; A. folliculosa	Razorback Beds	Spores	Affinities with the genus Saccoloma, type representative of the family Saccolomataceae. This fern spore resembles those of the living genus Saccoloma, being probably from a pantropical genus found in wet, shaded forest areas.	Extant Saccoloma specimens; Annulispora probably comes from similar genera or maybe a species in the genus
Baculatisporites	B. comaumensis	Razorback Beds	Spores	Affinities with the family Osmundaceae in the Polypodiopsida. Near fluvial current ferns, related to the modern Osmunda regalis.	Extant Osmunda specimens; Baculatisporites and Todisporites probably come from similar genera or maybe a species from the genus
Camarozonosporites	C. spp.	Razorback Beds	Spores	Incertae sedis; affinities with the Pteridophyta	
Cyathidites	C. australis; C. minor	Razorback Beds	Spores	Affinities with the family Cyatheaceae in the Cyatheales. Arboreal fern spores.	Extant Cyathea
Densoisporites	D. spp	Razorback Beds	Spores	Incertae sedis; affinities with the Pteridophyta	
Dictyophyllidites	D. mortoni	Razorback Beds	Spores	Affinities with the family Matoniaceae in the Gleicheniales.	
Duplexisporites	D. gyratus	Razorback Beds	Spores	Incertae sedis; affinities with the Pteridophyta	
Foraminisporis	F. tribulosus	Razorback Beds	Spores	Incertae sedis; affinities with the Pteridophyta	
Foveosporites	F. sp.	Razorback Beds	Spores	Incertae sedis; affinities with the Pteridophyta	
Heliosporites	H. spp	Razorback Beds	Spores	Incertae sedis; affinities with the Pteridophyta	
Indusiisporites	I. parvisaccatus	Razorback Beds	Spores	Incertae sedis; affinities with the Pteridophyta	
Osmundacidites	O. wellmanii	Razorback Beds	Spores	Affinities with the family Osmundaceae in the Polypodiopsida. Near fluvial current ferns, related to the modern Osmunda regalis.	
Rugulatisporites	R. spp.	Razorback Beds	Spores	Affinities with the family Osmundaceae in the Polypodiopsida. Near fluvial current ferns, related to the modern Osmunda regalis.	

=== Peltaspermales ===
Genus	Species	Stratigraphic position	Material	Notes	Images
Alisporites	A. australis; A. lowoodensis; A. sp.	Razorback Beds	Pollen	Affinities with the families Peltaspermaceae, Corystospermaceae or Umkomasiaceae in the Peltaspermales. Pollen of uncertain provenance that can be derived from any of the members of the Peltaspermales. The lack of distinctive characters and poor conservation make this pollen difficult to classify. Arboreal to arbustive seed ferns.	
Vitreisporites	V. contectus; V. pallidus	Razorback Beds	Pollen	From the family Caytoniaceae in the Caytoniales. Caytoniaceae are a complex group of Mesozoic fossil floras that may be related to both Peltaspermales and Ginkgoaceae.	

=== Conifers ===
Genus	Species	Stratigraphic position	Material	Notes	Images
Classopollis	C. classoides; C. simplex	Razorback Beds	Pollen	Affinities with the Hirmeriellaceae in the Pinopsida.	
Perinopollenites	P. sp.	Razorback Beds	Pollen	Affinities with the family Cupressaceae in the Pinopsida. Pollen that resembles that of extant genera such as the genus Actinostrobus and Austrocedrus, probably derived from dry environments.	Extant Austrocedrus
Podosporites	P. spp.	Razorback Beds	Pollen	Affinities with the family Podocarpaceae. Pollen from diverse types of Podocarpaceous conifers, that include morphotypes similar to the low arbustive Microcachrys and the medium arbustive Lepidothamnus, likely linked with Upland settings	Extant Microcachrys

== See also ==
- List of dinosaur-bearing rock formations
  - List of stratigraphic units with ornithischian tracks
    - Ornithopod tracks
