= Kaladongar Formation =

Geologic formation in India

- Stratigraphic range: Pliensbachian–Bajocian; ~185–168.5 Ma
- Type: Geological formation

Lithology
- Primary: Limestone

Location
- Region: Gujarat, Kachchh
- Country: India
- Extent: Kachchh Basin

The Kaladongar Formation is the oldest Mesozoic geologic formation of the Kachchh Basin. It is found in Patcham Island, Kachchh, Gujarat, India. It is made up of limestone and sandstone. It was later intruded by an olivine gabbroic intrusion which baked and shattered the overlying limestone. Dinosaur remains are among the fossils that have been recovered from the formation.

== Fossil content ==
Color key: Taxon / Reclassified taxon / Taxon falsely reported as present / Dubious taxon or junior synonym / Ichnotaxon / Ootaxon / Morphotaxon	Notes; Uncertain or tentative taxa are in small text; ~~crossed out~~ taxa are discredited.

=== Invertebrates ===
==== Ichnofossils ====
Ichnogenus	Ichnospecies	Provenance	Material	Notes	Images
Arenicolites	A. carbonarius	Kaladongar Hill range, Kuar Bet, Chappar Bet, Dingy Hills, Kuran village, Babia Cliff	Vertical U-shaped burrows	Suspension feeder traces.	
Asterosoma	A. radiciforme; A. ludwigae	Kaladongar Hill range, Kuar Bet, Chappar Bet and equivalent sections	Star-shaped burrows	Decapod feeding structures.	
Beaconites	B. coronus	Kaladongar Formation outcrops (Kuar Bet, Dingy Hills)	Meniscate burrows	Mobile deposit feeder traces.	
Bergaueria	B. hemispherica	Kaladongar Hill range sections	Plug-shaped or conical traces	Anemone Resting or dwelling traces.	
Chondrites	C. targionii; C. intricatus	Kaladongar Formation (various sections including Chappar Bet)	Dendritic feeding burrows	Deep-tier deposit feeders.	
Cochlichnus	C. anguineus	Kaladongar Hill range	Sinuous trails	Locomotion traces.	
Dactylophycus	D. isp.	Kaladongar Hill range	Branched traces	Feeding structures.	
Daedalus	D. verticalis	Kaladongar Hill range	Complex spreiten burrows	Feeding traces.	
Didymaulichnus	D. lyellii	Kaladongar Hill range	Bilobate trails	Crawling trail of molluscan origin.	
Diplocraterion	D. parallelum	Kuar Bet, Chappar Bet, Babia Cliff	U-shaped spreiten burrows	Equilibrium traces	
Gordia	G. arcuata	Kaladongar Hill range	Meandering trails	Grazing traces.	
Gyrochorte	G. comosa	Kaladongar Hill range, Kuar Bet, Dingy Hills	Bilobate meandering traces	Locomotion/feeding.	
Gyrolithes	G. isp.	Kaladongar Hill range	Helical burrows	Decapod dwelling/escape traces.	
Ichnocumulus	I. radiatus	Kaladongar Hill range	Cumulus-like traces	Feeding structures.	
Laevicyclus	L. isp.	Kaladongar Hill range	Circular traces	Dwelling shaft and scraping circles of Scolelepis.	
Lockeia	L. amygdaloides; L. siliquaria	Kaladongar Formation (bivalve-rich layers)	Bivalve resting traces	Shallow infaunal activity.	
Margaritichnus	M. reptilis	Kaladongar Formation	Pear-shaped traces	Wormlike sediment-eating animals.	
Monocraterion	M. tentaculatum	Kuar Bet, Chappar Bet	Single funnel-shaped burrows	Dwelling structures of worm-like organisms.	
Nereites	N. missouriensis	Kaladongar Hill range	Meandering grazing traces	Made by worms, gastropods or crustaceans.	
Ophiomorpha	O. nodosa	Kaladongar Hill range, Kuar Bet and equivalent	Pelleted burrows	Squillidae, especially Oratosquilla-like.	
Palaeobullia	P. isp.	Kaladongar Hill range	Grazing trails	Made by gastropods.	
Palaeophycus	P. isp.	Kaladongar Formation sections	Simple horizontal burrows	Dwelling traces.	
Phoebichnus	P. trochoides	Kaladongar Hill range	Radial traces	Feeding structures.	
Phycodes	P. circinnatum; P. palmatum	Kaladongar Hill range	Bundled feeding burrows	*Phycodes* assemblage.	
Pilichnus	P. dichotomus	Kaladongar Hill range	Piliform traces	Feeding traces.	
Planolites	P. beverleyensis; P. striatus; P. tubularis; P. annulatus	Widespread in Kaladongar Formation (Kuar Bet to Babia Cliff)	Simple unlined burrows	Worm-like deposit feeder traces.	
Protovirgularia	P. dichotoma	Kaladongar Hill range	Chevronate locomotion traces	Made by bivalves.	
Rhizocorallium	R. jenense; R. irregulare; R. uraliense	Kaladongar Hill range, Chappar Bet, Dingy Hills	Spreiten U-burrows	Feeding/dwelling.	
Scolicia	S. prisca; S. isp.	Kaladongar Hill range	Meniscate bilobate trails	Deposit feeder/locomotion activity of echinoids.	
Skolithos	S. linearis	Kuar Bet, Chappar Bet, Babia Cliff and other high-energy sections	Vertical cylindrical burrows	Made by polychaetes like Nereis.	
Taenidium	T. serpentinum	Kaladongar Hill range	Meniscate burrows	Mobile deposit feeders.	
Teichichnus	T. rectus	Kaladongar Hill range	Spreiten burrows	Deposit feeder traces.	
Thalassinoides	T. horizontalis; T. suevicus; T. isp.	Kaladongar Hill range and equivalent localities	Branching boxwork burrows	Crustacean dwelling.	
Walcottia	W. devilsdingli	Kaladongar Hill range	Complex traces	Feeding or locomotion traces.	

=== Anthozoa ===
Genus	Species	Provenance	Stratigraphic position	Material	Notes	Images
Cyathophora	C. bourgueti	Kachchh	Babia Cliff Sandstone	Eleven specimens	Cyathophorinae coral	

=== Dinosaurs ===
Genus	Species	Provenance	Stratigraphic position	Material	Notes	Images
Camarasauromorpha indet.	Indeterminate	Kachchh		Fragmentary remains belonging to an animal 20 metres in length.	A large indeterminate camarasauromorph	
Ceratocaudia	C. antiqua	Kachchh	Pliensbachian to Bajocian	IITBR 3-59, partial skeleton consisting of several cervical and caudal vertebrae, an isolated chevron, and elements of the appendicular skeleton including an interclavicle, an ulna, metacarpals, femora, tibiae, fibulae, and a metatarsal.	A macronarian sauropod	
Sauropoda indet.	Indeterminate	Kachchh	Aalenian to Bajocian	A partial skeleton, consisting of 12 vertebrae, several limb bones and 80 other elements reported by 2000. The fossil were deposited at Border Security force HQ.	An indeterminate sauropod	

=== Fish ===
Genus	Species	Provenance	Stratigraphic position	Material	Notes	Images
Strophodus	S. atlasensis; S. magnus; S. sp.	Kachchh	Bajocian to Bathonian	Teeth	A durophagous acrodontid hybodont	

=== Flora ===
Genus	Species	Provenance	Stratigraphic position	Material	Notes	Images
Alisporites	A. sp. A; A. sp. B	Kuar Bet	Dingi Hill Member	Pollen	Corystospermaceae	
Araucariacites	A. australis	Kuar Bet	Dingi Hill Member	Pollen	Araucariaceae	
Araucarites	A. sp.	Kuar Bet	Dingi Hill Member	Cone scale	Araucariaceae	
Callialasporites	C. dampieri; C. sp.	Kuar Bet	Dingi Hill Member	Pollen	Araucariaceae	
Concavissimisporites	C. sp. cf. C. variverrucatus	Kuar Bet	Dingi Hill Member	Spore	Filicopsida	
Coniopteris	C. kuarbetensis	Kuar Bet	Dingi Hill Member	Fronds	Polypodiidae	
Cyathidites	C. australis; C. concavus	Kuar Bet	Dingi Hill Member	Spore	Cyatheaceae	
Densoisporites	D. sp.	Kuar Bet	Dingi Hill Member	Spore	Filicopsida	
Dictyophyllidites	D. harrisii	Kuar Bet	Dingi Hill Member	Spore	Dipteridaceae	
Ginkgocycadophytes	G. sp.	Kuar Bet	Dingi Hill Member	Pollen	Ginkgoaceae	
Klukisporites	K. sp.	Kuar Bet	Dingi Hill Member	Spore	Schizaeales	
?Podocarpidites	?P. sp.	Kuar Bet	Dingi Hill Member	Pollen	Podocarpaceae	
Pachypteris	P. haburensis	Kuar Bet	Dingi Hill Member	Fronds	Corystospermaceae	
?Sphagnumsporites	?S. sp.	Kuar Bet	Dingi Hill Member	Spore	Sphagnaceae	
Sphenopteris	S. specifica	Kuar Bet	Dingi Hill Member	Fronds	Incertade sedis	

== See also ==
- List of dinosaur-bearing rock formations
  - List of stratigraphic units with indeterminate dinosaur fossils
