= Spence Shale =

Member of the Langston Formation in Idaho and Utah, United States

- Stratigraphic range: Cambrian, Miaolingian, Wuliuan; ~507.5–506 Ma
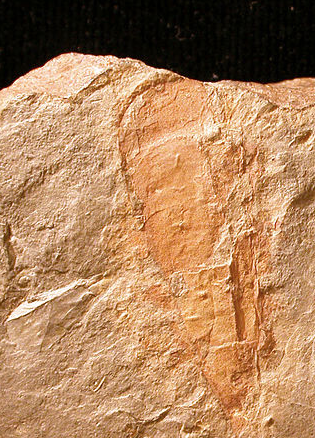
- Hyolitha, Spence Shale
- Type: Member
- Thickness: 9–120 m (30–394 ft)

Lithology
- Primary: carbonate mudstones
- Other: carbonate-rich siliciclastic mudstones and Wackestones

Location
- Region: Idaho, Utah
- Country: United States

Type section
- Named for: Spence Gulch
- Named by: Charles Doolittle Walcott

The Spence Shale is the middle member of the Langston Formation in southeastern Idaho and northeastern Utah. It is exposed in the Bear River Range, the Wasatch Range and the Wellsville Mountains. It is known for its abundant Cambrian trilobites and the preservation of Burgess Shale-type fossils.

The type locality is Spence Gulch in southeastern Idaho, near the town of Liberty. It was first described by Charles Doolittle Walcott in 1908.

== Stratigraphy ==
The Spence Shale spans the Albertella and Glossopleura biozones.

== Fauna ==
Generic list of the fauna of the Spence Shale:

=== Arthropoda ===
==== Soft-bodied ====
- Anomalocaris
- Canadaspis
- Caryosyntrips
- Dioxycaris
- Hurdia
- Isoxys
- Leanchoilia
- Meristosoma
- Mollisonia
- Sidneyia
- Tuzoia
- Utahcaris
- Waptia
- Yohoia

==== Agnostida ====
- Pentagnostus
- Ptychagnostus

==== Trilobita ====
- Alokistocare
- Alokistocarella
- Amecephalus
- Athabaskia
- Bathyuriscus
- Bythicheilus
- Chancia
- Ehmaniella
- Glossopleura
- Kochina
- Kootenia
- Ogygopsis
- Olenoides
- Oryctocara
- Oryctocephalites
- Oryctocephalus
- Pagetia
- Piochaspis
- Polypleuraspis
- Ptychoparella
- Solenopleura
- Syspacephalus
- Thoracocare
- Utia
- Zacanthoides

=== Brachiopoda ===
- Acrothele
- Dictyonina
- Diraphora
- Lingulella
- Micromitra?
- Wimanella

=== Mollusca ===
- Latouchella
- Scenella
- Wiwaxia

=== Lophotrochozoa ===
- Haplophrentis
- Hyolithellus
- Hyolithes

=== Echinodermata ===
- Ctenocystis
- Gogia
- Lyracystis
- Ponticulocarpus
- Totiglobus

=== Hemichordata ===
- Margaretia
- Sphenoecium

=== Priapulida ===
- Ottoia
- Selkirkia
- Wronascolex?

=== Lobopodia ===
- Acinocricus
- Hallucigenia

=== Porifera ===
- Brooksella?
- Protospongia
- Vauxia

=== Problematica ===
- Banffia
- Eldonia
- Siphusauctum
- Tentalus

=== Algae ===
- Marpolia

=== Cyanobacteria ===
- Morania

=== Trace Fossils ===
- Archaeonassa
- Arenicolites
- Aulichnites
- Bergaueria
- Chloephycus
- Conichnus
- Coprolite
- Cruziana
- Dimorphichnus
- Diplichnites
- Gordia
- Gyrophyllites
- Halopoa
- Lockeia
- Monomorphichnus
- Nereites
- Phycodes
- Phycosiphon
- Planolites
- Protovirgularia
- Rusophycus
- Sagittichnus
- Scolicia
- Taenidium
- Teichichnus
- Tomaculum
- Treptichnus
- Trichophycus

== See also ==
- List of fossiliferous stratigraphic units in Idaho
- List of fossiliferous stratigraphic units in Utah
- Paleontology in Idaho
- Paleontology in Utah
