= Ceratocaudia =

Ceratocaudia Temporal range: Jurassic, ~?Pliensbachian to Bajocian
- Silhouette with known material of C. antiqua indicated

Scientific classification
- Kingdom: Animalia
- Phylum: Chordata
- Class: Reptilia
- Clade: Dinosauria
- Clade: Saurischia
- Clade: †Sauropodomorpha
- Clade: †Sauropoda
- Clade: †Macronaria
- Genus: †Ceratocaudia; Abhishek et al., 2026

Type species
- †Ceratocaudia antiqua Abhishek et al., 2026

Genus of sauropod dinosaur

Ceratocaudia (lit. 'horned tail') is a genus of macronarian sauropod dinosaur from the Jurassic Kaladongar Formation of Gujarat, India. The genus contains a single species, Ceratocaudia antiqua, known from a partial skeleton.

== Discovery and naming ==
The Ceratocaudia antiqua holotype specimen was collected from the low-energy estuarine sediments of the Khadir Uplift of Kaladongar Formation in Kutch district of Gujarat, India. It consists a cervical (neck) and several caudal (tail) vertebrae, an isolated chevron, and elements of the appendicular skeleton including an interclavicle, an ulna (forearm bone), metacarpals (finger bones), femora (thighbones), tibiae, fibulae (lower leg bones), and a metatarsal (toe bone). They are housed in the Indian Institute of Technology Bombay in Mumbai, India, where they are permanently accessioned under as IITBR3–IITBR59.

In 2026, Abhishek Natarajan and colleagues described the remains as belonging to a new genus and species of sauropod dinosaur. The generic name, Ceratocaudia, comes from the Ancient Greek word κέρας, meaning 'horn', and the Latin word cauda, meaning 'tail', after the horn-like crest on the anterior caudal neural spine. The specific name, antiqua, is a Latin word meaning 'ancient'.

== Description ==
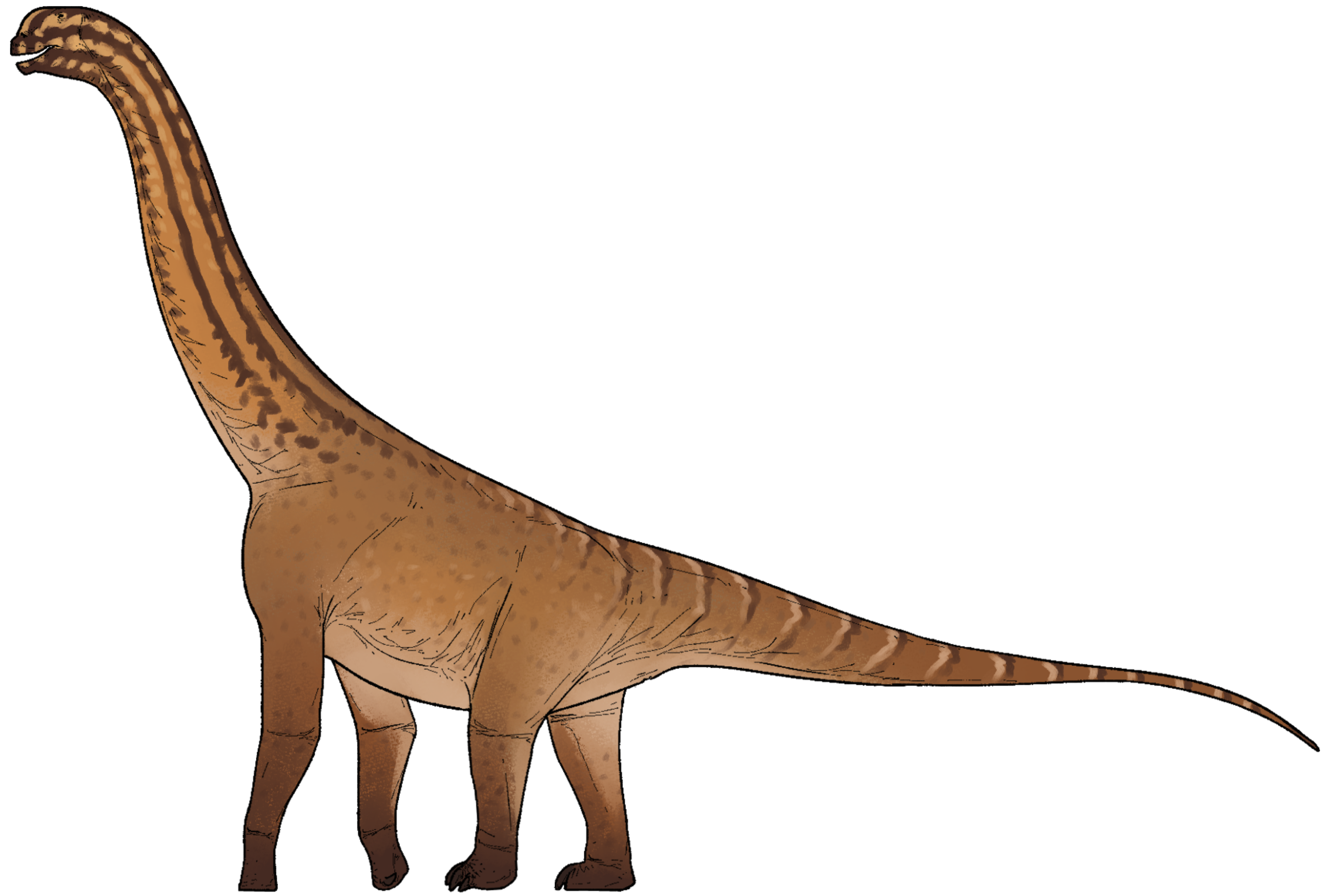
Life restoration

The Ceratocaudia holotype is estimated to belong to an animal about 7 metres (23 ft) long, making it one of the smallest known macronarians. There is a possibility that it represents a dwarf taxon. Based on histological analysis and the presence of a non-traumatic pathology, the holotype appears to have been a senescent (old) individual. A reconstructed muscle model of the tail suggests it could have been used to deter predators.

== Classification ==
To determine the relationships of Ceratocaudia, Abhishek et al. (2026) scored it in the phylogenetic matrices of Mannion & Moore (2025) and Pérez Moreno et al. (2023). Both analyses placed Ceratocaudia within the Macronaria, outside the Titanosauriformes, making it one of the oldest such sauropods and adding to the evidence of a global pre-Bajocian distribution of macronarians. The reduced strict consensus results of the Mannion & Moore (2025) dataset, pruning 21 taxa, is shown in the cladogram below:

- Macronaria
  - - - - Lourinhasaurus
        - Camarasaurus
      - - Tehuelchesaurus
        - - Haestasaurus
          - Janenschia
    - - - Mierasaurus
        - - Moabosaurus
          - Tendaguria
      - - Zby
        - Turiasaurus
        - Losillasaurus
  - - Aragosaurus
    - - Ceratocaudia
      - - Galveosaurus
        - Titanosauriformes

== Paleoecology ==
The sediments in which Ceratocaudia was found also consist of abundant petrified wood and bivalves like Protocardia and Indocorbula that lived in brackish waters. The Khadir Uplift, of a different horizon but of the same age, has yielded a large fragmentary sauropod which is estimated to be 20 metres long, as well as the hybodont shark Strophodus magnus. The presence of a large contemporary sauropod suggests niche partitioning between it and Ceratocaudia, though it is unknown what ecological role they had in their environment, as both lack cranial material.
