= Hutton Sandstone =

Geologic formation in Queensland, Australia

- Stratigraphic range: Bajocian; ~171–168 Ma
- Type: Geological formation
- Unit of: Bundamba Group
- Underlies: Birkhead Formation, Injune Creek Group, Walloon Coal Measures, Durabilla Formation
- Overlies: Evergreen & Poolowanna Formations
- Thickness: Up to 290 m (950 ft)

Lithology
- Primary: Sandstone
- Other: Siltstone, mudstone, coal, conglomerate

Location
- Coordinates: 28°50′36.93″S 149°30′03.29″E
- Approximate paleocoordinates: 64.2°S 89.9°E
- Region: Queensland
- Country: Australia
- Extent: Surat Basin

Type section
- Named for: Mount Hutton
- Hutton Sandstone (Australia)

The Hutton Sandstone is a geological formation of the Surat Basin in Queensland, Australia. The ferruginous sandstones and coal were deposited in a floodplain environment and dates back to the Bajocian.
