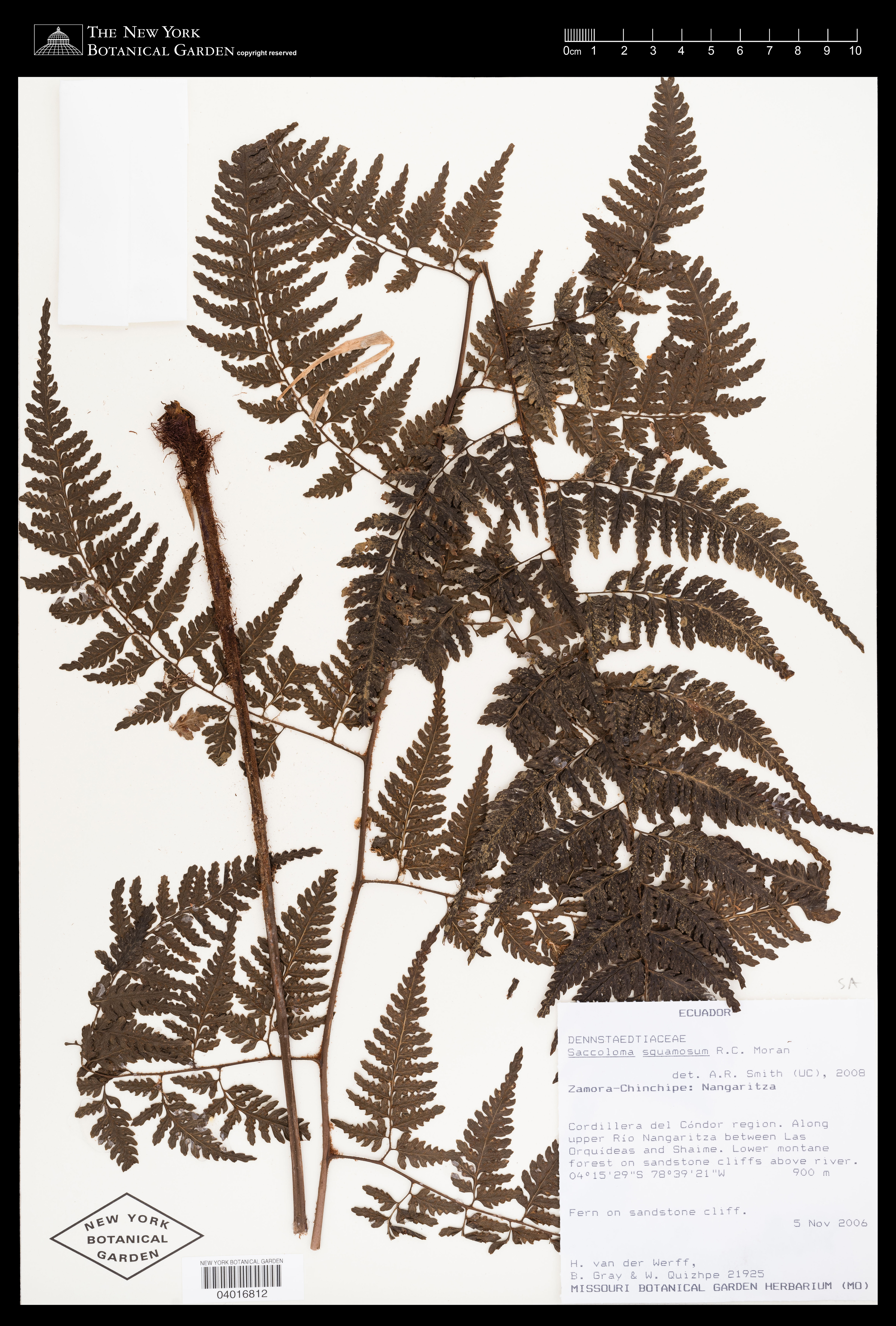

Conservation status
- Endangered (IUCN 3.1)

Scientific classification
- Kingdom: Plantae
- Clade: Tracheophytes
- Division: Polypodiophyta
- Class: Polypodiopsida
- Order: Polypodiales
- Family: Saccolomataceae
- Genus: Saccoloma
- Species: S. squamosum

Binomial name
- Saccoloma squamosum R.C.Moran

= Saccoloma squamosum =

Species of fern

Saccoloma squamosum is a species of fern in the family Saccolomataceae. It is endemic to Ecuador. Its natural habitat is subtropical or tropical moist lowland forests. It is threatened by habitat loss.
