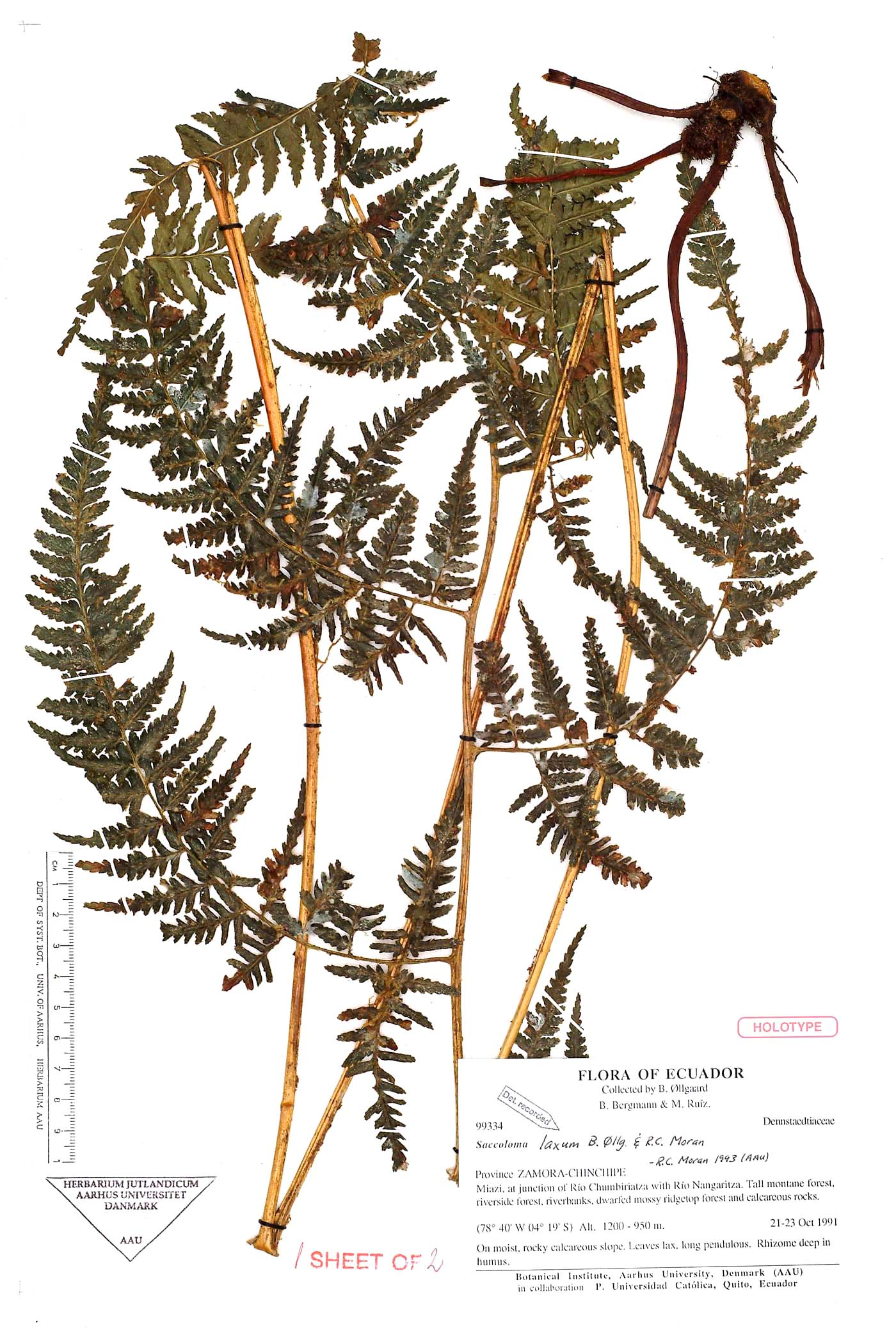

Conservation status
- Endangered (IUCN 3.1)

Scientific classification
- Kingdom: Plantae
- Clade: Tracheophytes
- Division: Polypodiophyta
- Class: Polypodiopsida
- Order: Polypodiales
- Family: Saccolomataceae
- Genus: Saccoloma
- Species: S. laxum

Binomial name
- Saccoloma laxum R.C.Moran & B.Øllg.

= Saccoloma laxum =

Species of fern

Saccoloma laxum is a species of fern in the family Lindsaeaceae. It is endemic to Ecuador, where it is only known from a single location in Zamora-Chinchipe Province. It grows in Amazonian forest habitat on limestone, a rock type which is rare in the region. It is threatened by urbanization and deforestation.
