= Holocystis =

Holocystis Temporal range: 125.45–112.6 Ma

Scientific classification
- Domain: Eukaryota
- Kingdom: Animalia
- Phylum: Cnidaria
- Subphylum: Anthozoa
- Class: Hexacorallia
- Order: Scleractinia
- Family: †Cyathophoridae
- Genus: †Holocystis; Lonsdale, 1850

Species
- †Holocystis bukowinensis; †Holocystis dupini; †Holocystis elegans (syn. †Cyathophora elegans); †Holocystis nomikosi

Synonyms
- Nowakocoenia Kolodziej and Gedl, 2000; Tetracoenia d'Orbigny, 1850

Extinct genus of corals

Holocystis is a genus of prehistoric stony corals.
