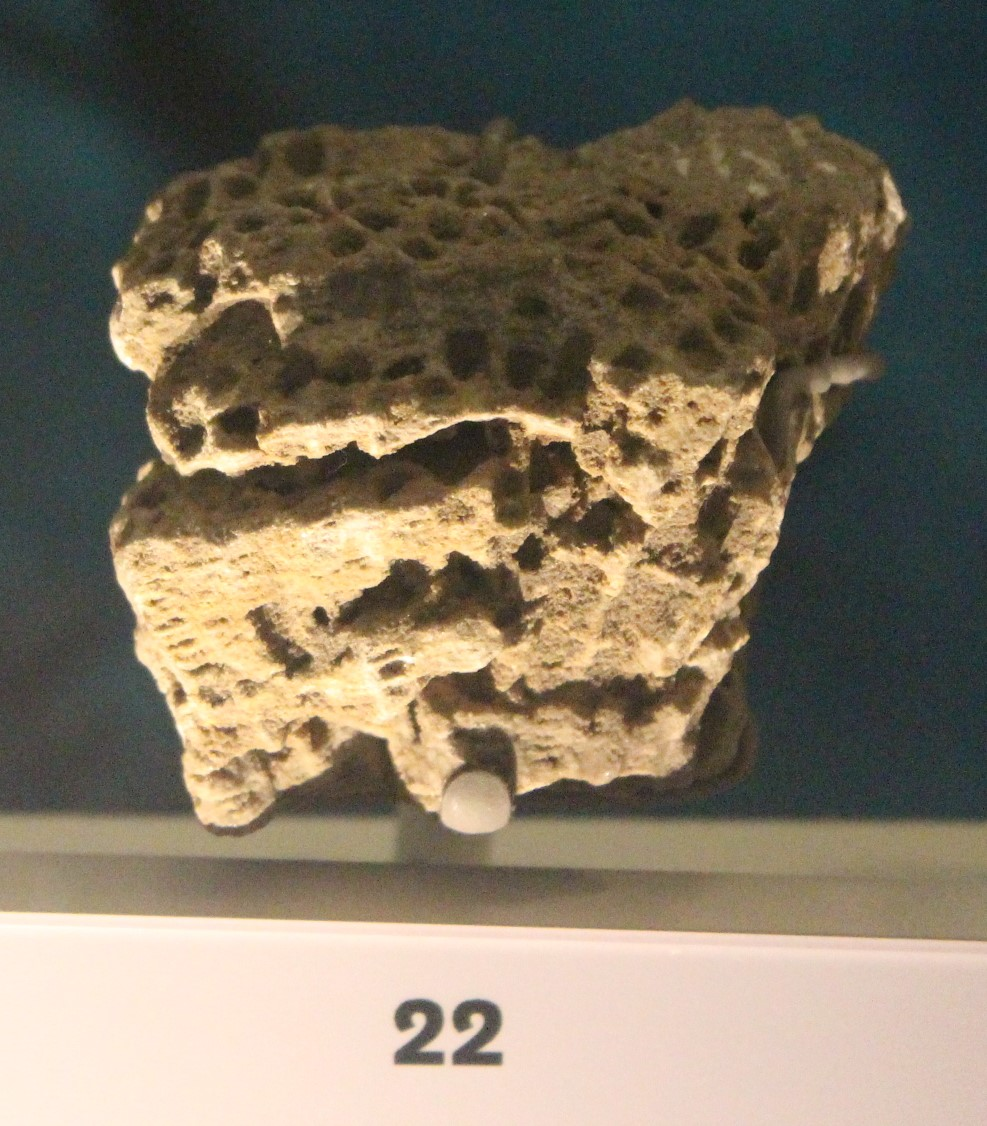
- C. bourgueti fossil, National Museum of Natural History

Scientific classification
- Domain: Eukaryota
- Kingdom: Animalia
- Phylum: Cnidaria
- Class: Hexacorallia
- Order: Scleractinia
- Family: †Stylinidae
- Subfamily: †Cyathophorinae
- Genus: †Cyathophora; Michelin, 1843

Species
- †Cyathophora atempa; †Cyathophora babaevi; †Cyathophora bangoinensis; †Cyathophora bourgueti; †Cyathophora cesaredensis; †Cyathophora claudiensis; †Cyathophora densata; †Cyathophora denseta; †Cyathophora dollfussi; †Cyathophora faveolata; †Cyathophora globosa; †Cyathophora gomangcoensis; †Cyathophora haysensis; †Cyathophora kobyi; †Cyathophora micrommatos; †Cyathophora miyakoensis; †Cyathophora neocomiensis; †Cyathophora olssoni; †Cyathophora parva; †Cyathophora pironae; †Cyathophora pratti; †Cyathophora steimanni; †Cyathophora steinmanni; †Cyathophora thurmanni; †Cyathophora tithonica

Synonyms
- Orbignycoenia

= Cyathophora (coral) =

Cyathophora Temporal range: 167.7–84.9 Ma

Extinct genus of corals

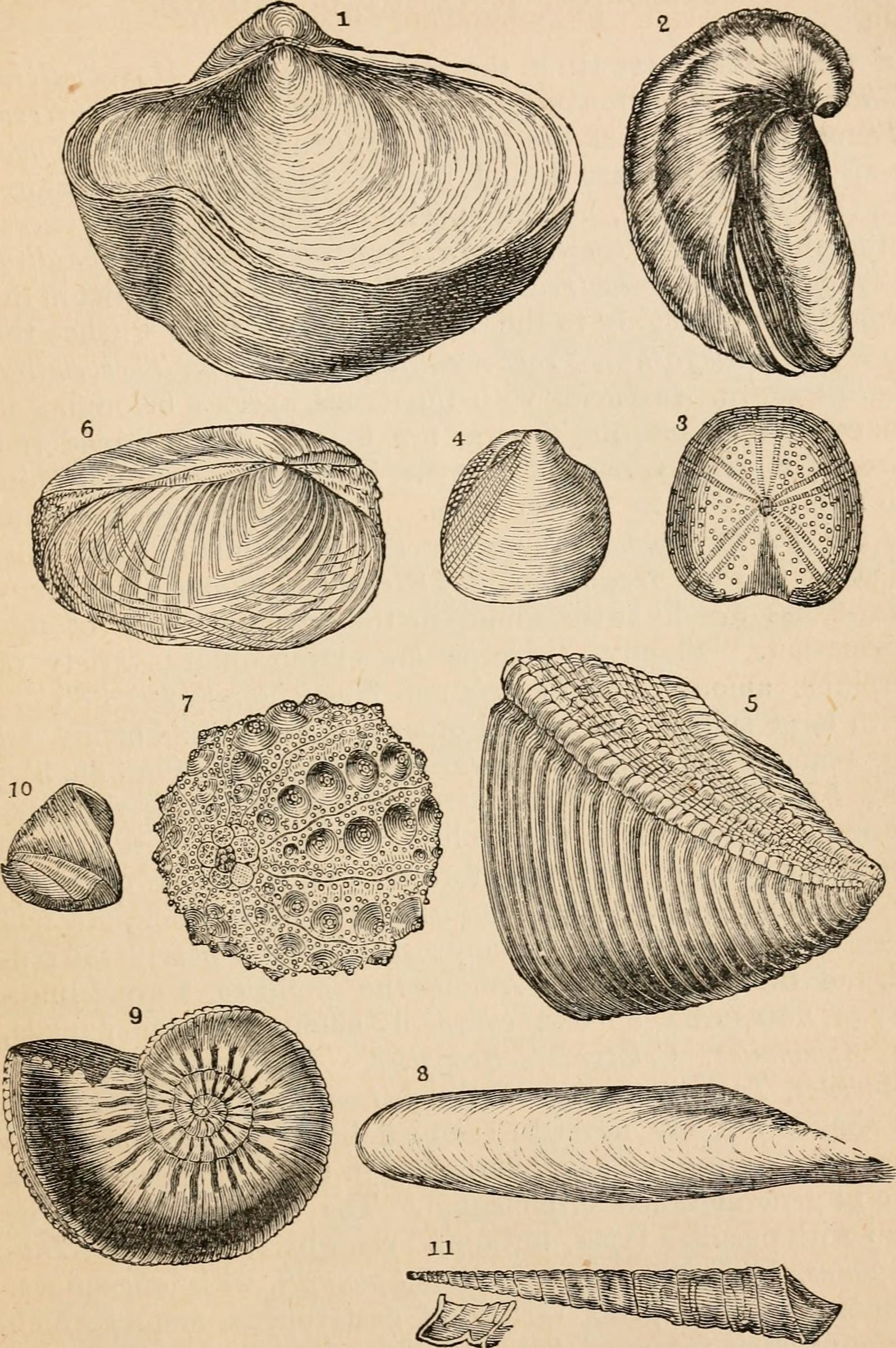
Early sketches of the prehistoric coral

Cyathophora is a genus of prehistoric stony corals.

Names brought to synonymy

- †Cyathophora elegans, a synonym for †Holocystis elegans
