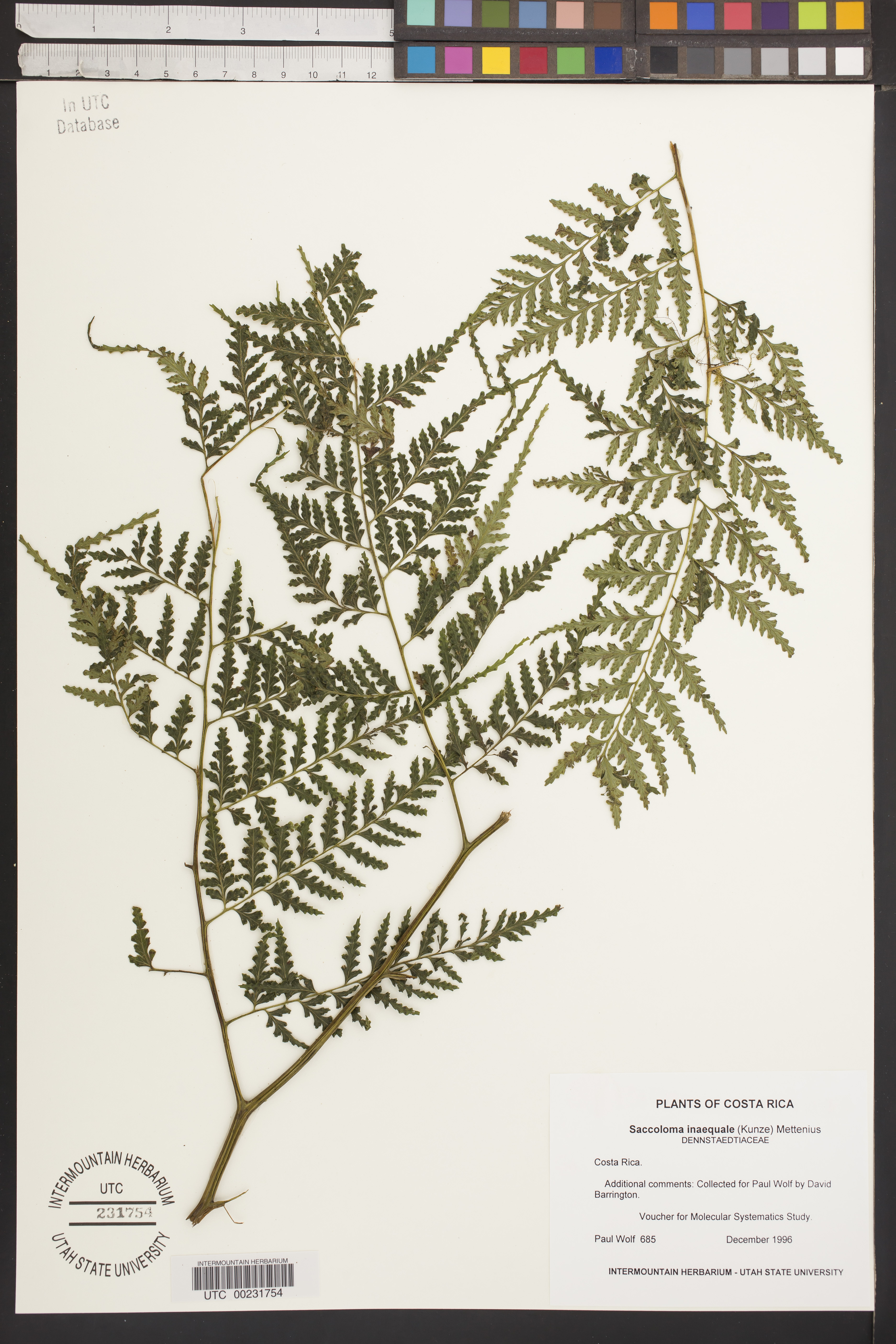
- Saccoloma inaequale herbarium specimen

Scientific classification
- Kingdom: Plantae
- Clade: Tracheophytes
- Division: Polypodiophyta
- Class: Polypodiopsida
- Order: Polypodiales
- Family: Saccolomataceae
- Genus: Saccoloma; Kaulf.

Type species
- Saccoloma elegans Kaulf.

Species
- See text

Synonyms
- Neuropteris Desv.; Orthiopteris Copel.

= Saccoloma =

Genus of ferns

Saccoloma is a fern genus in family Saccolomataceae. It is the only genus in the family in the Pteridophyte Phylogeny Group classification of 2016 (PPG I), but further investigation is needed. It is pantropical and its species are found in wet, shaded forest areas. Saccoloma species are characterized by an omega-shaped (Ω) vascular bundle in the cross-sections of their petioles. The common name soralpouch fern is used for Saccoloma.

== Phylogeny ==
Saccoloma includes Orthiopteris in the Pteridophyte Phylogeny Group classification of 2016 (PPG I), with a total of 18 species. As of August 2019, Plants of the World Online accepts the following species (which may be based on a wider circumscription of the genus). Synonyms are taken from the Checklist of Ferns and Lycophytes of the World.

Phylogeny of Saccoloma

- - Orthiopteris
    - O. campylura (Kunze) Copel. (syn. Saccoloma campylurum (Kunze) Mett.; Saccoloma caudatum Copel.; Saccoloma kingii (Bedd.) G.B.Nair)
    - O. ferulacea (T. Moore) Copel. (syn. Saccoloma ferulaceum (T.Moore) R.M.Tryon & A.F.Tryon)
  - Saccoloma
    - - S. galeottii (Fée) A.Rojas
      - S. sunduei A.Rojas
    - - - S. domingense (Spr.) Prantl
        - S. elegans Kaulf. (syn. Saccoloma chartaceum G.B.Nair)
      - - S. inaequale (Kunze) Mett.
        - - S. brasiliense (C.Presl) Mett.
          - S. nigrescens (Mett.) A.Rojas

Other species include:

- Saccoloma acuminatum (Rosenst.) Christenh. (syn. Orthiopteris acuminata(Rosenst.) Copel.)
- Saccoloma cicutarioides (Baker) Christenh. (syn. Orthiopteris cicutarioides (Baker) Copel.)
- Saccoloma firmum (Kuhn) C.Chr. (syn. Orthiopteris firma (Kuhn) Brownlie)
- Saccoloma henriettae (Baker) C.Chr. (syn. Orthiopteris henriettae (Baker) Copel.)
- Saccoloma laxum R.C.Moran & B.Øllg.
- Saccoloma membranaceum Mickel
- Saccoloma moranii A.Rojas
- Saccoloma quadripinnatum A.Rojas
- Saccoloma samoense (Hovenkamp & T.T.Luong) Christenh. (syn. Orthiopteris samoensis Hovenk. & T. T. Luong)
- Saccoloma squamosum R.C.Moran
- Saccoloma tenue (Brack.) Mett. (syn. Orthiopteris tenuis (Brack.) Brownlie)
- Saccoloma trichophyllum (Copel.) G.B.Nair (syn. Orthiopteris trichophylla Copel.)
