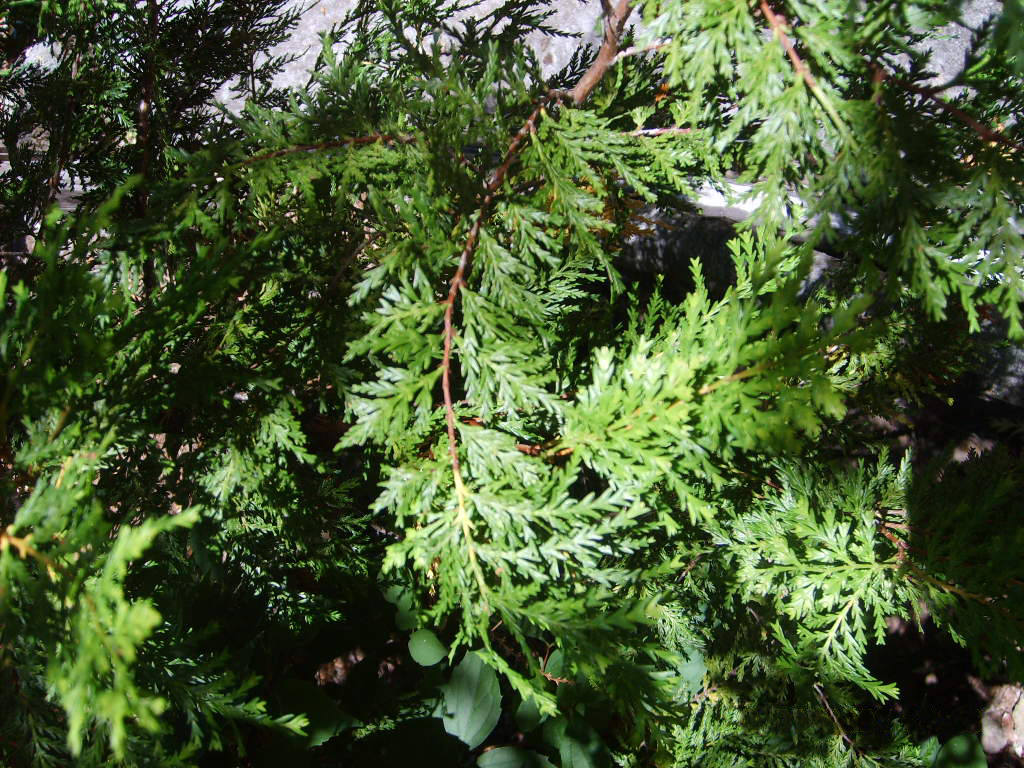

Conservation status
- Near Threatened (IUCN 3.1)

Scientific classification
- Kingdom: Plantae
- Clade: Tracheophytes
- Clade: Gymnosperms
- Division: Pinophyta
- Class: Pinopsida
- Order: Cupressales
- Family: Cupressaceae
- Subfamily: Callitroideae
- Genus: Austrocedrus; Florin & Boutelje
- Species: A. chilensis

Binomial name
- Austrocedrus chilensis (D.Don) Pic.Serm. & Bizzarri

Synonyms
- Cupressus chilensis Gillies ex Hook. nom. inval.; Cupressus thujoides Pav. ex Carrière; Libocedrus chilensis (D.Don) Endl.; Libocedrus excelsa Gordon nom. inval.; Thuja andina Poepp.; Thuja chilensis D.Don; Thuja cuneata Dombey ex Endl. nom. inval.

= Austrocedrus =

Austrocedrus Temporal range: Campanian–Present

Species of plant

Austrocedrus is a monotypic genus of conifer in the cypress family, Cupressaceae. Its sole living species, Austrocedrus chilensis, is native to the Valdivian temperate rain forests and the adjacent drier steppe-forests of central-southern Chile and western Argentina from 33°S to 44°S latitude. It is known in its native range as ciprés de la cordillera or cordilleran cypress, and elsewhere by the scientific name as Austrocedrus, or sometimes as Chilean incense-cedar or Chilean cedar. The generic name means "southern cedar". It also contains 1 extinct species, Austrocedrus vetus, from the Late Cretaceous of Antarctica.

It is a member of the subfamily Callitroideae, a group of distinct Southern Hemisphere genera associated with the Antarctic flora. It is closely related to the New Zealand and New Caledonian genus Libocedrus, and some botanists treat it within this genus, as Libocedrus chilensis, though it resembles Libocedrus less than the other South American cypress genus Pilgerodendron does.

It is a slow-growing, narrowly conical coniferous tree which grows from 10 to 24 m in height, with scale-like leaves arranged in decussate pairs. The leaves are unequal in size, with pairs of larger (4–8 mm) leaves alternating with pairs of smaller (2–3 mm) leaves, giving a flattened shoot. Each leaf has a prominent white stomatal stripe along the outer edge. The cones are 5–10 mm long, with four scales, two very small sterile basal scales and two large fertile scales; each fertile scale has two winged seeds 3–4 mm long. This is a dioecious species, with male and female cones growing on separate plants.

Cordilleran cypress is found in the evergreen mountain forests of the Andes, usually on drier sites near the temperate rainforest, in open pure woods (where it is often locally dominant on the eastern slopes of the Andes in southwestern Argentina) or in association with Araucaria araucana and Nothofagus species. Young plants grow best in conditions of 8% or higher soil humidity and intermediate to high solar radiation.

It has been introduced to northwest Europe and the Pacific Northwest of North America, where it is occasionally grown in botanical gardens.
