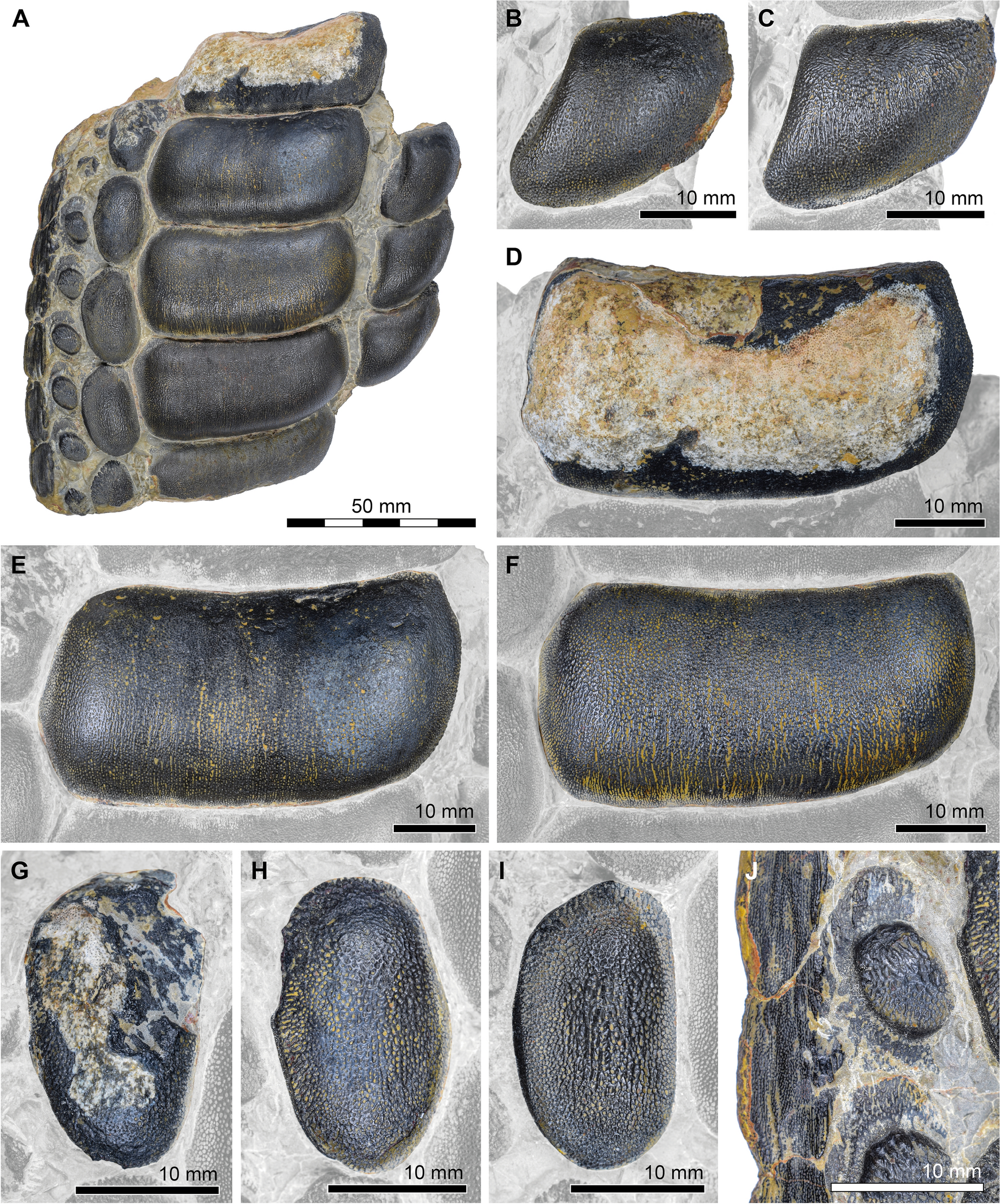
- Jaw fragment of Strophodus atlasensis
- Crushed jaws of Strophodus from the Late Jurassic of Germany

Scientific classification
- Kingdom: Animalia
- Phylum: Chordata
- Class: Chondrichthyes
- Order: †Hybodontiformes
- Family: †Acrodontidae
- Genus: †Strophodus; Agassiz, 1838

Species
- See text

= Strophodus =

Strophodus Temporal range: Middle Triassic–Hauterivian

Extinct genus of cartilaginous fishes

Strophodus is an extinct genus of durophagous hybodont known from the Triassic to Cretaceous. It was formerly confused with Asteracanthus.

== Taxonomy ==
It has long been confused with Asteracanthus due to the fin spines of the latter being found associated with the teeth of Strophodus. However, both genera can now be reliably be distinguished base on the morphology of both the fin spines and teeth.

== Description ==
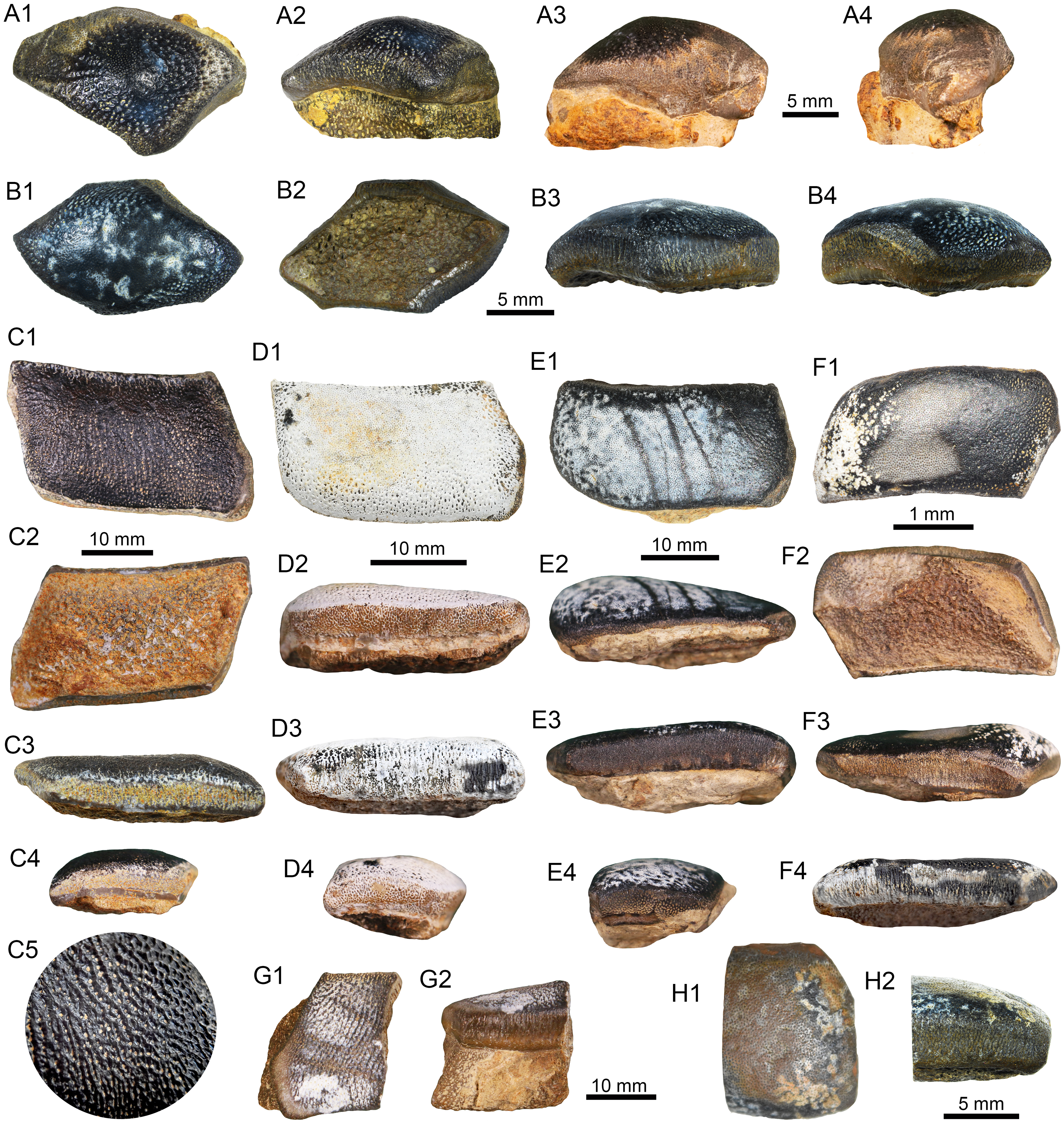
Teeth of Strophodus rebecae

Species of Strophodus had heavily rounded, durophagous crushing teeth, contrasting strongly with those of Asteracanthus, which are much more similar to those of Hybodus. Species of Strophodus have been estimated to reach up to 3 metres (9.8 ft) in length, making them some of the largest hybodonts. Like Asteracanthus, but unlike other hybodonts, the fin spines of Strophodus are covered in tubercles rather than being ribbed.

== Ecology ==
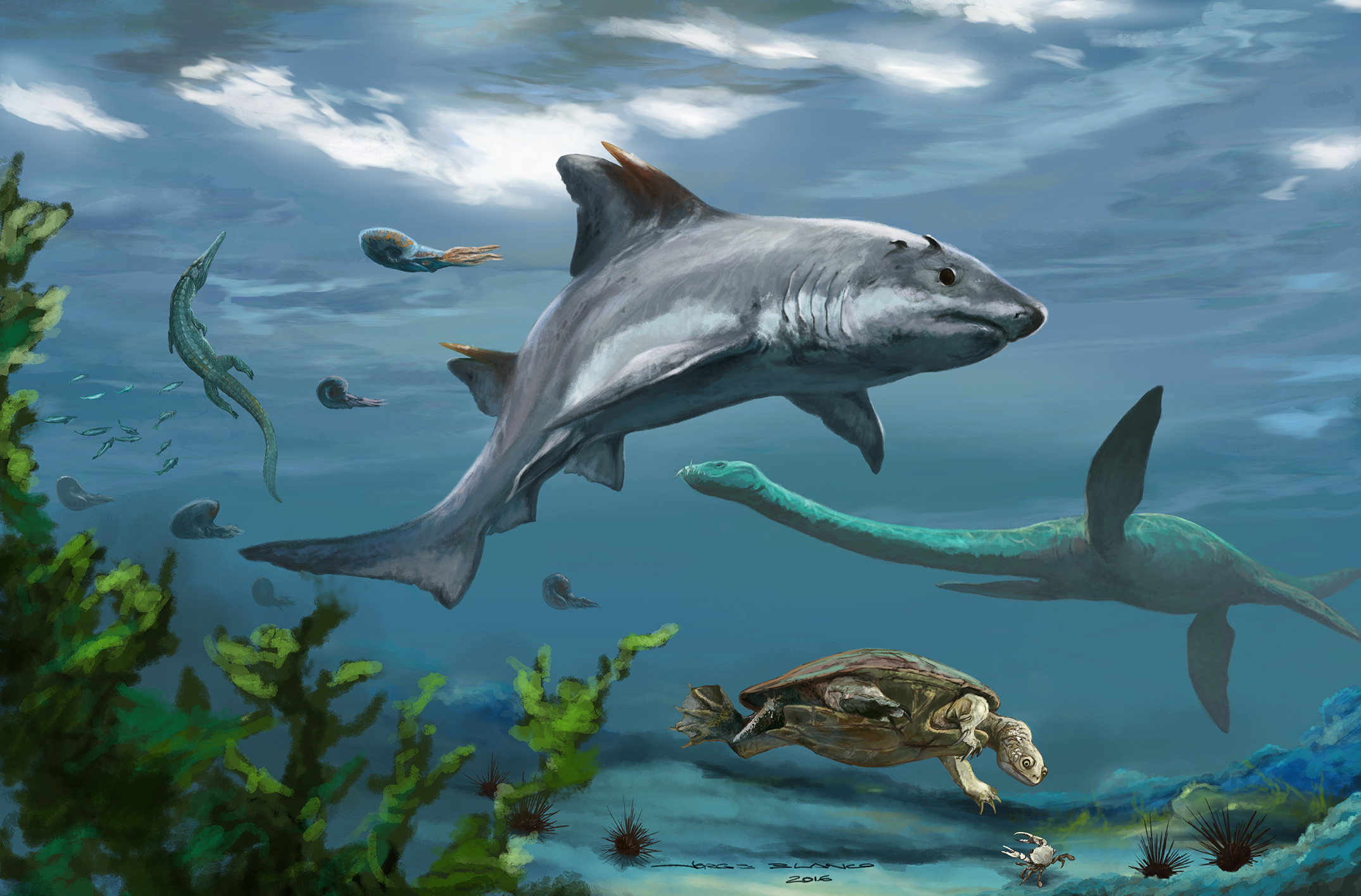
Life reconstruction of Strophodus rebecae with associated fauna found in the Rosa Blanca Formation

Strophodus has been interpreted as a bottom-dwelling animal that fed on hard-shelled invertebrates, though isotopic evidence has suggested that it may have been pelagic. It may also have been euryhaline.

== Species ==
Species of Strophodus:

- S. reticulatus (Agassiz, 1838) Middle-Late Jurassic (Bathonian–Tithonian) England, France, Germany, Hungary and Switzerland. A similar form S. cf. reticulatus is known from the Middle Triassic of Switzerland
- S. atlasensis (Stumpf et al., 2023) Middle Jurassic (Bajocian) Morocco
- S. smithwoodwardi (Peyer, 1946) Early Jurassic (Toarcian) Switzerland
- S. dunaii (Szabó & Főzy, 2020) Middle Jurassic (Aalenian) Hungary
- S. tenuis (Agassiz, 1838) Middle Jurassic (Aalenian-Bathonian) Germany, England
- S. longidens (Agassiz, 1838) Middle Jurassic (Bathonian) France
- S. magnus (Agassiz, 1838) Middle Jurassic (Bathonian) France, India, England
- S. indicus (Sharma & Singh, 2021) Middle Jurassic (Bathonian) India
- S. jaisalmerensis (Kumar et al., 2021) Middle Jurassic (Bathonian) India
- S. medius (Owen, 1869) Middle Jurassic (Bathonian-Callovian) India, France, England
- S. subreticulatus (Agassiz, 1838) Late Jurassic (Kimmeridgian) Switzerland
- S. timoluebkei (Carrillo-Briceño et al., 2025) Late Jurassic Switzerland
- S. udulfensis (Leuzinger et al., 2017) Late Jurassic (Kimmeridgian) Switzerland, ?England
- S. tridentinus (Zittel, 1870) Late Jurassic (Tithonian) Italy (possibly a nomen dubium)
- S. rebecae (Carrillo-Briceño & Cadena, 2022) Early Cretaceous (Valanginian-Hauterivian) Colombia

Indeterminate remains of Strophodus possibly extend into the Albian stage of the Early Cretaceous. Claimed records of the genus from the Late Cretaceous are doubtful.
