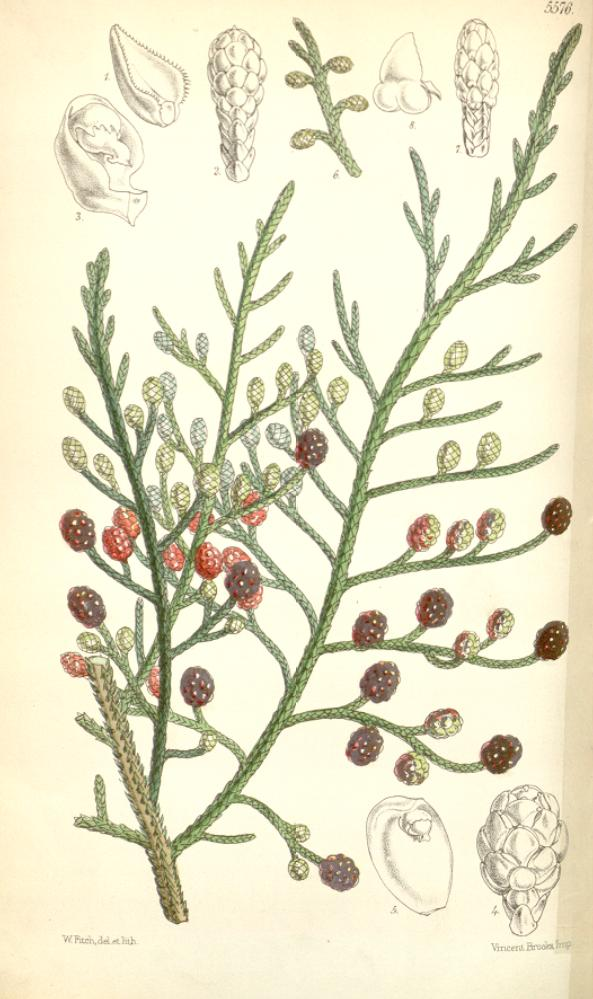
- Microcachrys tetragona, Illustration.

Scientific classification
- Kingdom: Plantae
- Clade: Tracheophytes
- Clade: Gymnosperms
- Division: Pinophyta
- Class: Pinopsida
- Order: Araucariales
- Family: Podocarpaceae
- Genus: Microcachrys; Hook.f.
- Species: M. tetragona

Binomial name
- Microcachrys tetragona (Hook.) Hook.f.

Synonyms
- Athrotaxis tetragona Hook.; Dacrydium tetragonum (Hook.) Parl.

= Microcachrys =

Genus of conifers

Microcachrys tetragona, the creeping pine or creeping strawberry pine, is a species of dioecious conifer in the family Podocarpaceae. It is the sole species of the genus Microcachrys, endemic to western Tasmania, where it is a low shrub growing to 1 m tall at high elevations. Its leaves are scale-like, arranged (unusually for the Podocarpaceae) in opposite decussate pairs, superficially resembling those of the unrelated Diselma archeri (Cupressaceae). It shares the common name creeping pine with several other plants. Females produce tiny, red, edible berries in summer.

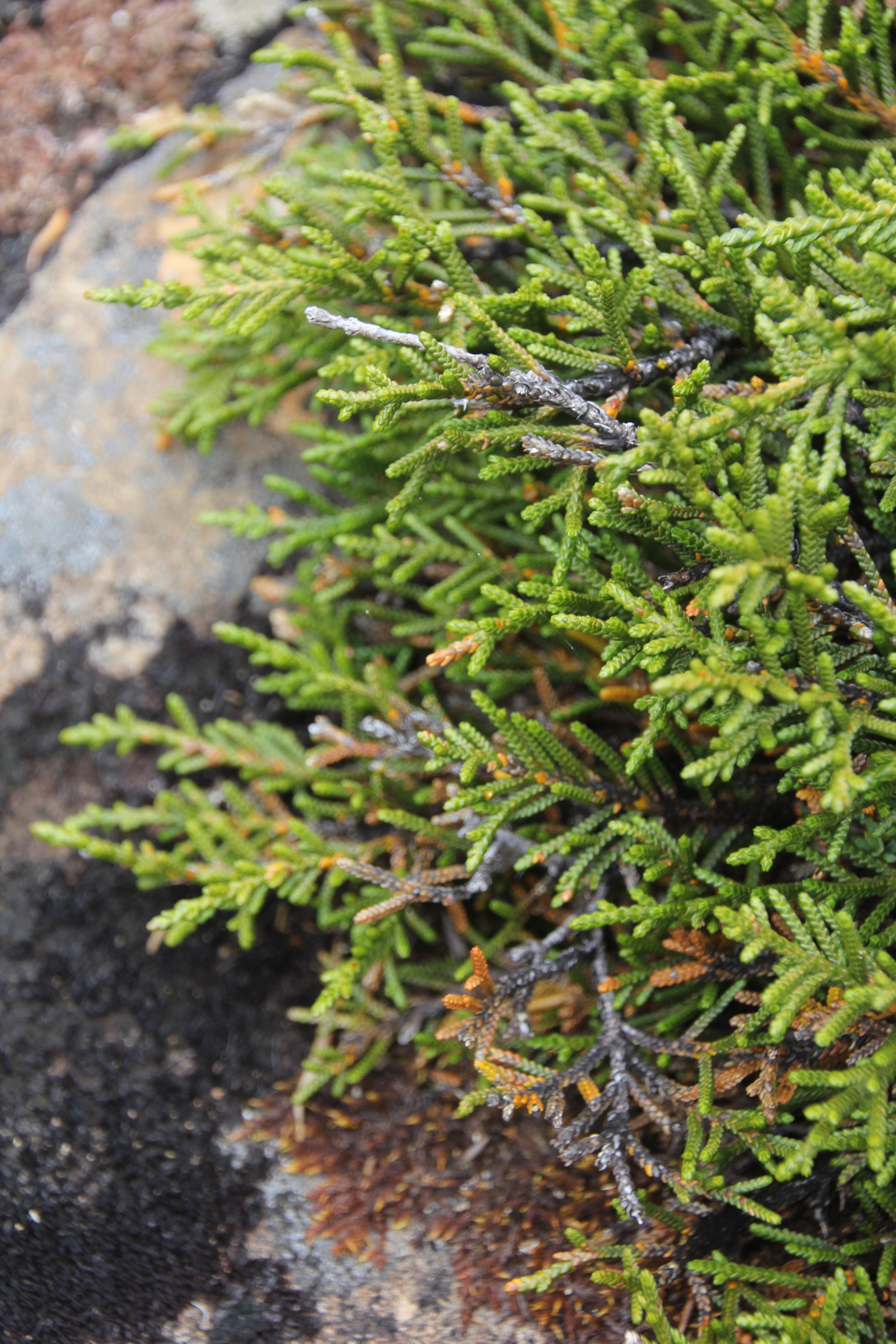
Microcachrys tetragona foliage

== Fossil record and paleoendemism ==
Microcachrys has been called one of the most spectacular cases of paleoendemism. It is a known relictual plant, being widespread in the past but now having a very restricted distribution. The only extant species today, Microcachrys tetragona, produces a very distinctive pollen grain compared with other members of its family, Podocarpaceae, and records of fossil pollen from the genus have been recorded from all over the Southern Hemisphere throughout the Cenozoic, being found in Antarctica, Australia, the now sunken islands of the Ninety East Ridge of the Indian Ocean, New Zealand, southern Africa and South America. Ocean drillings in the Kerguelen Plateau near Heard Island have revealed conifer remains with twigs very similar in appearance to those of Microcachrys.

The genus Microcachrys clearly had a very broad, Gondwanic distribution. But now, the sole surviving species, Microcachrys tetragona, is a shrub restricted to Tasmanian mountain thickets and boulder-fields. The fossil record of Microcachrys is one of many compelling lines of evidence which points to the highly dynamic and changing Southern Hemisphere vegetation through the Cenozoic since the break up of Gondwana.
