= Conichnus =

Trace fossil classification
- Ichnogenus: †Conichnus; Myannil, 1966

Type ichnospecies
- Conichnus conicus Myannil, 1966

Ichnospecies
- Conichnus conicus Myannil, 1966; Conichnus papillatus (Myannil, 1966)

Synonyms
- Amphorichnus Myannil, 1966

Trace fossil

Conichnus is an ichnogenus of trace fossil.

== See also ==
- Ichnology
