= Surat Basin =

Coordinates: 30°50′36.93″S 149°30′03.29″E

The Surat Basin is a geological basin in eastern Australia. It is part of the Great Artesian Basin drainage basin of Australia. The Surat Basin extends across an area of 270,000 square kilometres and the southern third of the basin occupies a large part of northern New South Wales, the remainder is in Queensland. It comprises Jurassic through to Cretaceous aged sediments derived from Triassic and Permian arc rocks of the Hunter-Bowen orogeny. Towns situated above the basin, once dominated by agriculture, are experiencing a boom as mines and infrastructure in the area are expanded.

== Formation ==
The Surat Basin is an intracratonic basin that covers a sizeable section of New South Wales and southern Queensland. It was formed by fluvial sedimentation of an intracratonic area which underwent sediment sag-loading in the Jurassic to Cretaceous.

== Stratigraphy ==
The western central parts of the Surat Basin unconformably overlies the Palaeozoic igneous, metamorphic and sedimentary rocks of the Lachlan Fold Belt.

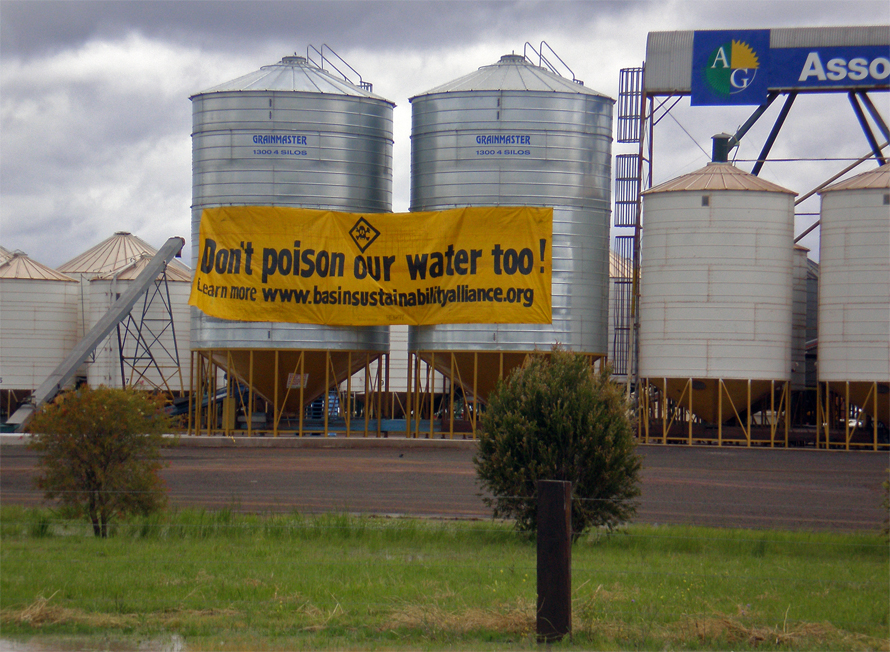
Primary producers are especially concerned with the environmental and economic impacts of the Basin's development, Dalby, 2010

In the east and northern parts of Queensland it unconformably overlies the sedimentary basin rocks of the Hunter-Bowen Orogen. The Surat Basin overlies parts of the Bowen Basin in southern Queensland, and overlies the Gunnedah Basin in central New South Wales.

Palaeozoic basement highs mark the western and eastern boundaries of the Surat Basin. The Nebine Ridge delineates the boundary between the Surat Basin and the Eromanga Basin to the west. The Nebine Ridge is well developed in Queensland and gravity data indicate that the southern extension of the ridge into northern New South Wales is terminated by cross faulting. In Queensland the Kumbarilla Ridge divides the Surat Basin from the Clarence-Moreton Basin to the east.

The mostly flat-lying basin has a maximum thickness of about 2,500 m in Queensland, with up to 1,800 m preserved in New South Wales.

Deposition in the Surat Basin commenced in the Early Jurassic with the Precipice Sandstone, a quartzose blocky sandstone unit interpreted as being deposited in a Braided Stream environment.

the Precipice Sandstone is overlain by the finer grained and lower energy Evergreen formation. The Evergreen also contains local sand unit known as the Boxvale Sandstone.

The Evergreen is conformably overlain by the Hutton Sandstone, which in turn is overlain by the Walloon Coal Measures.

After a brief (although debated) hiatus, the Springbok Sandstone was deposited. It is unclear whether the thickness changes in the Walloon Coal Measures indicate a major erosional event (unconformity), or if the contact is only locally scoured.

The Springbok Sandstone grades upward into the Westbourne Formation. This contact is poorly defined, and still subject to debate.

The westbourne is then overlain progressively by the Gubbermunda Sandstone, Oralo Formation, Mooga Sandstone, Bungil Formation, Wallumbilla Formation, Surat Siltstone, and finally the Griman Creek Formation.

Later sediments have been removed by erosion since Cretaceous times.

== Economic geology ==
Since the early 2000s the Coal Seam Gas has been produced from multiple fields. More than conventional 100 hydrocarbon accumulations have been found in the basin however only half are producing. The Surat Basin is not very important a target for oil as the source rocks have not generally been subjected to suitable conditions to evolve oil. There is some slight conventional natural gas potential. Jurassic coal seams have been worked and explored in the Queensland portions of the basin.

=== Mines ===
The basin has a number of mines such as Wilkie Creek Mine where Peabody Energy Australia mines and then exports coal.

=== Coal Seam Gas ===
The basin has a number of coal seam gas (CSG) fields - also known as coalbed methane - developing in the region. These fields presently supply both the domestic market, including a number of power stations and the Roma to Brisbane Pipeline, and Liquified Natural Gas (LNG) Plants located on Curtis Island near Gladstone to export Surat Basin gas to international markets. The Port of Gladstone is undergoing a A$3.5 billion expansion to accommodate expected demands. In 2010, two energy companies confirmed their mines have the potential to affect groundwater levels.

== See also ==
- Bituminous coal
- Mining in Australia
