= Phycosiphon =

Trace fossil

Phycosiphon is an ichnogenus of trace fossil. The first recorded fossil was found in Scunthorpe, United Kingdom.

== See also ==
- Ichnology
