= Asterosoma =

Asterosoma Temporal range: Paleozoic

Scientific classification
- Domain: Eukaryota
- Supergroup: Archaeplastida
- Clade: Viridiplantae
- Genus: †Asterosoma; Schimper, 1868

Species
- Asterosoma radiciforme; Asterosoma ludwigae

Trace fossil ichnogenus

Asterosoma is an ichnogenus of trace fossils typically found in marine sedimentary rocks. These trace fossils are recognized by their characteristic radiating burrow systems, which often resemble a star-like pattern, hence the name Asterosoma (from Greek aster meaning "star" and soma meaning "body"). These burrows are believed to have been created by organisms living in the sediment, possibly deposit-feeding worms, during the Paleozoic era.

== Description ==
Asterosoma trace fossils are distinguished by their radial symmetry and complex burrow structures. The burrows often have a central tube with radiating arms that can be straight or curved, depending on the sedimentary environment. The morphology of Asterosoma suggests a behavioral pattern where the trace-making organism moved within the sediment to feed or escape predation.

== Geological significance ==
Asterosoma is a valuable indicator of paleoenvironmental conditions, particularly in shallow marine settings. These trace a fossils are commonly found in transgressive–regressive cycles, where they can provide insights into the sedimentary dynamics and the behavior of ancient marine life. The presence of Asterosoma in the rock record can help geologists reconstruct past environments and understand the biological activity that took place during the deposition of the host sediments.

== Fossil record ==
Asterosoma trace fossils have been recorded in various locations worldwide, with notable occurrences in Devonian strata of the Paraná Basin, Brazil, and other Paleozoic formations. These fossils are often associated with other ichnogenera, contributing to a broader understanding of the ecological interactions within ancient sedimentary environments.

== See also ==
- Ichnology
