= Scolicia =

Trace fossil

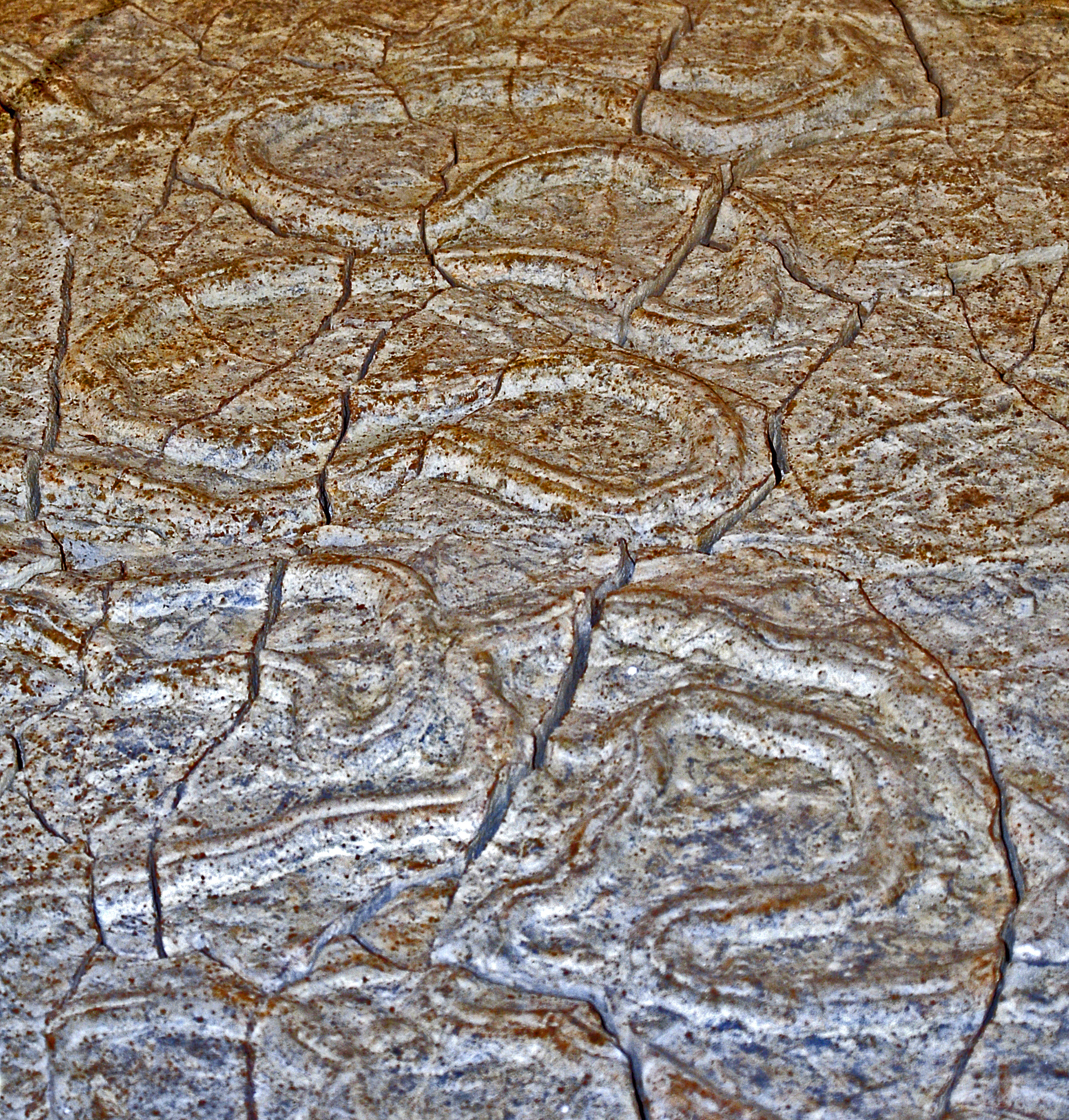
Scolicia strozzii (Savi and Meneghini, 1851), trails made by echinoids about 65-40 million years ago (from Italy)

Scolicia de Quartrefages, 1849 is a parataxon of ichnofossils present in sedimentary rocks of marine, marginal lacustrine, alluvial, or fluvial facies. These fossil traces appear in a wide geological range, from the Cambrian to the present.

Scolicia traces appear as horizontal, bilaterally symmetrical, meandering trails, variably shaped, ridgelike or ribbon like, about 1-5 centimeters wide. The trail consists of two parallel and identical in width stripes with variable trasversal ribs and a central channel.

Although the term Scolicia is the most common for this type of trails or burrows in some cases, when the transverse ribbing is not very clear, it is used for the positive impression (epirelief) the term Palaeobullia and for the negative impression (hyporelief) the term Subphyllochorda.

These very common fossil traces are locomotion or feeding traces made by different animal groups in their movement in the mud of the seabed, beneath the sand or in the transition from one to another area.

When these traces do not have the transverse ribbing their realization is usually assigned to members of various groups of gastropods and crustaceans.

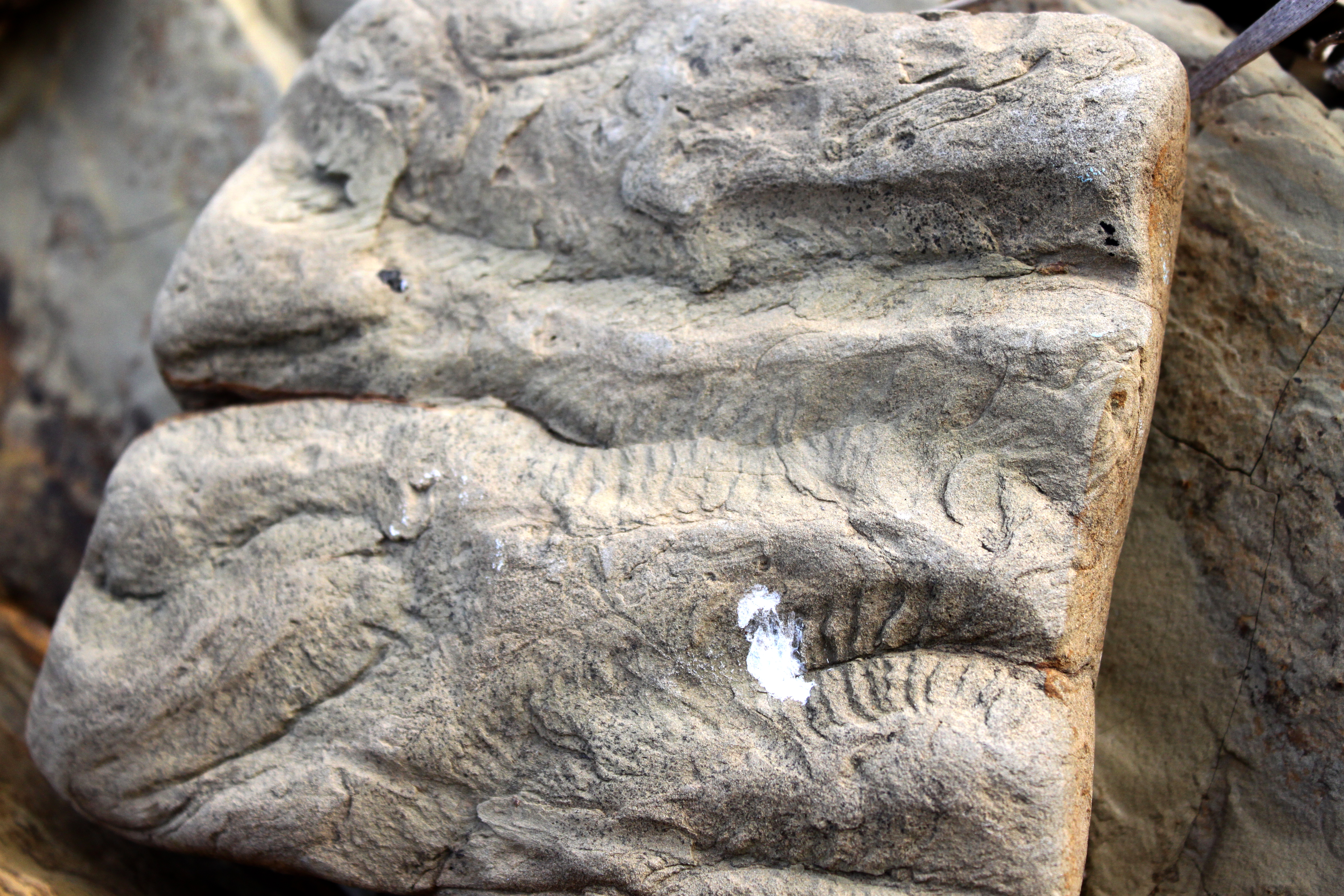
Ichnofossil Scolicia from Oligocene-Miocene of Spain

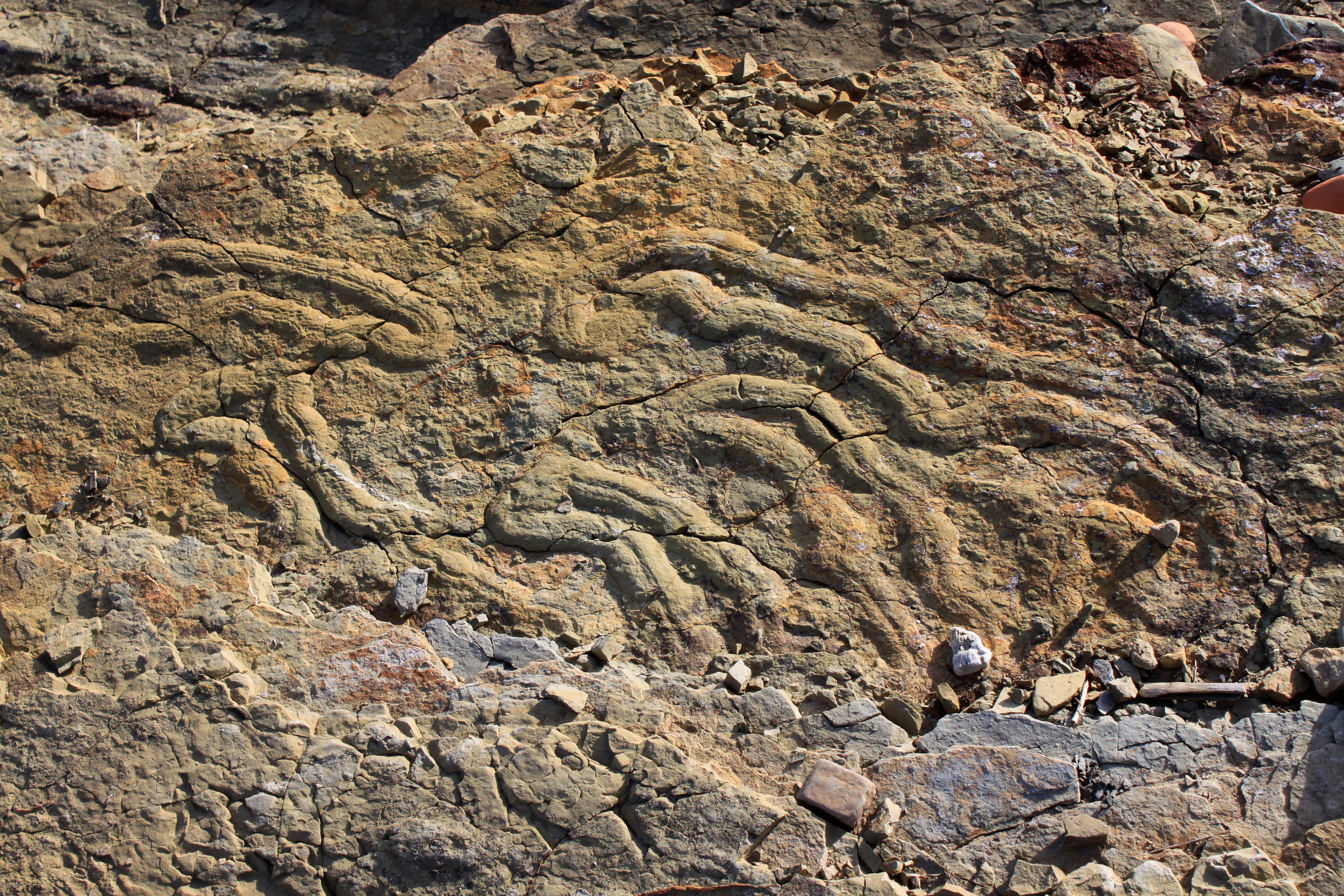
Ichnofossil Scolicia type Subphyllochorda from Oligocene-Miocene of Spain
