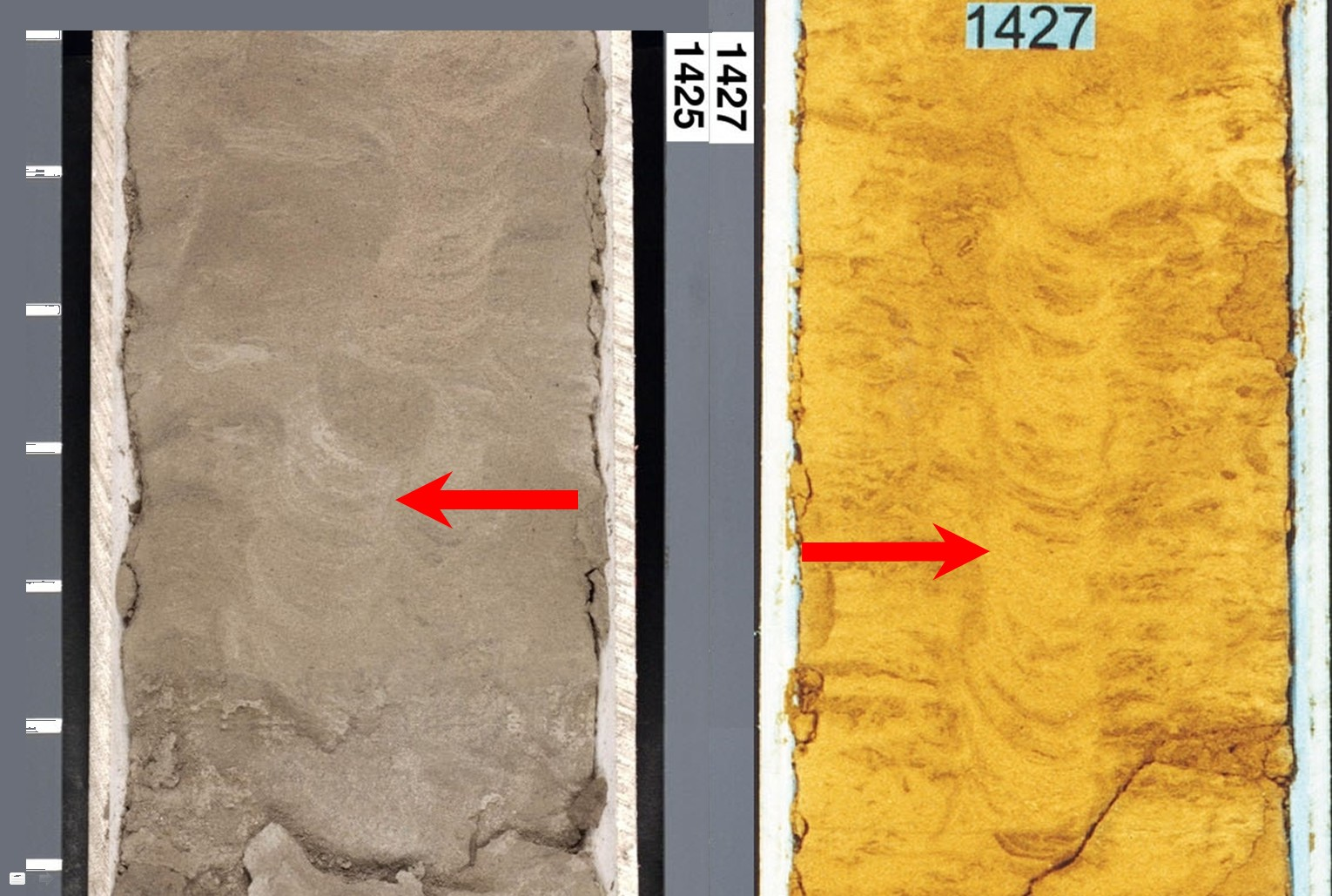
- Teichichnus trace in a Belridge Diatomite (Upper Miocene) core from Lost Hills Oil Field, California. The left core is shown in white light; the right core in UV light.

Trace fossil classification
- Ichnogenus: †Teichichnus; Seilacher, 1955

= Teichichnus =

Trace fossil

Teichichnus is an ichnogenus with a distinctive form produced by the stacking of thin 'tongues' of sediment, atop one another. They are believed to be fodinichnia, with the organism adopting the habit of retracing the same route through varying heights of the sediment, which would allow it to avoid going over the same area. These 'tongues' are often quite sinuous, reflecting perhaps a more nutrient-poor environment in which the feeding animals had to cover a greater area of sediment, in order to acquire sufficient nourishment. Teichichnus is recognized as a series of tightly packed, concave-up or down laminae, and lacks an outside border or lining, which distinguishes Teichichnus from the Diplocraterion ichnogenus. Teichichnus has 18 named species, of which 4 are valid (T. rectus, T. zigzag, T. patens and T. duplex).
