= Taenidia =

Taenidia (singular: taenidium) are circumferential thickenings of the cuticle inside a trachea or tracheole in an insect's respiratory system. The geometry of the Taenidiae varies across different orders of insects and even throughout the tracheae in an individual organism. Taenidia generally take the form of either hoop or spiral thickenings of the tracheal cuticle.
