= Hasandong Formation =

Geologic formation in South Korea

- Stratigraphic range: Aptian-Albian; ~118.0–112.4 Ma
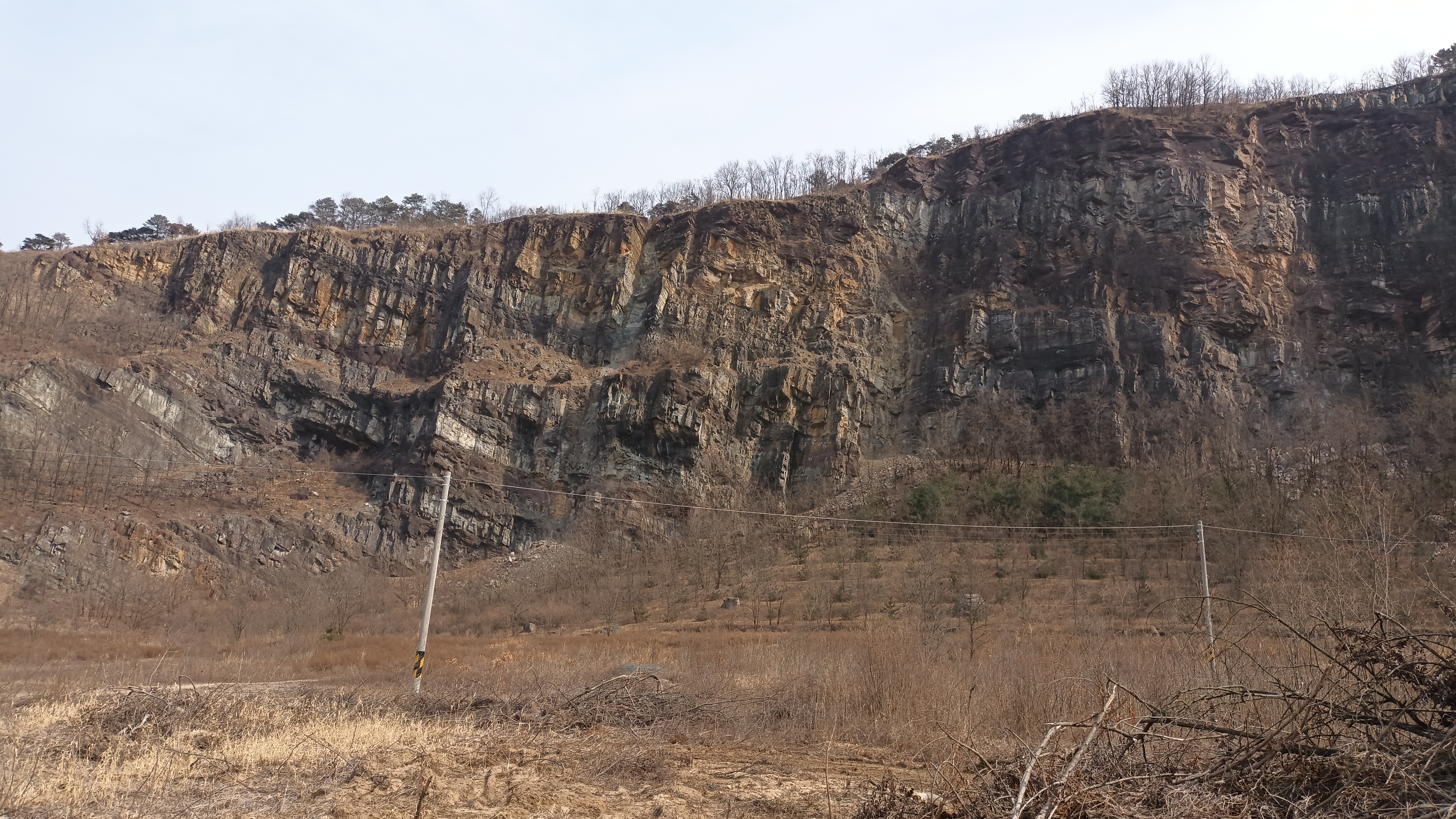
- Outcrop of the Hasandong Formation in Hasanri, Daegu
- Type: Geological formation
- Unit of: Shindong Group
- Underlies: Jinju Formation
- Overlies: Nakdong Formation
- Thickness: 1,200 metres

Lithology
- Primary: Mudstone
- Other: Shale, sandstone

Location
- Coordinates: 35.1°N 128.0°E
- Approximate paleocoordinates: 41.3°N 128.1°E
- Region: Gyeongsang Province
- Country: South Korea

Type section
- Named for: Hasandong(Now called Hasan-ri), Daegu
- Named by: Tateiwa, 1929
- Hasandong Formation (South Korea)

The Hasandong Formation (Korean: 하산동층; RR: Hasandong-cheung) is a Lower Cretaceous geologic formation in South Korea. It has been dated to the Aptian to possibly the earliest Albian stage.

The Hasandong Formation could be distinguished from the underlying Nakdong Formation and the overlying Jinju Formation by frequent intercalations of reddish beds. The paleoenvironment of this formation represents a floodplain with a meandering channel including occasional pond deposits. Meanwhile, the paleoclimate has been interpreted as a seasonal alternation of wet and dry seasons.

Based on detrital zircons, Lee et al. 2010 and 2018 estimated the maximum depositional age of the formation at 118.0 ± 2.6 Ma, and suggested that the overlying Jinju Formation likely had a maximum depositional age of 112.4 ± 1.3 Ma. Chae et al. (2026) examined two fossiliferous localities of the upper Hasandong Formation on Yusu-ri, Jinju and on Jangguseom Island of Jungpyeong-ri, Hadong, and estimated the maximum depositional age on each site at 116.9 ± 1.5 Ma and 113.4 ± 1.4 Ma respectively. Fossils including plants, molluscs, diverse vertebrate remains including dinosaurs, turtles, and pterosaurs are known from this formation.

== Fossil content ==
=== Invertebrate fossils ===
Few fragments of insects have been discovered from the formation.

==== Molluscs ====
Molluscs reported from the Hasandong Formation
Genus	Species	Location	Stratigraphic position	Material	Notes	Images
Plicatounio	P. naktongensis					
Plicatounio	P. okjuni					
Plicatounio	P. yooni					
Nagdongia	N. soni					
Trigonioides	T. jaehoi					
Trigonioides	T. kodairai					
Trigonioides	T. tamurai					
Brotiopsis	B. kobayashii					
Brotiopsis	B. naktongensis					
Brotiopsis	B. ryohoriensis					
Brotiopsis	B. wakinoensis					
Viviparus	V. sp.				Architaenioglossan gastropod, probably V. keishoensis	
Probaicalia	P. katoensis				Hydrobiidae gastropod; species previously assigned to the genus Micromelania	

==== Ostracods ====
Ostracod carapaces have been discovered from the formation.

Ostracods reported from the Hasandong Formation
Genus	Species	Location	Stratigraphic position	Material	Notes	Images
Cypridea	C. cf. trita					

=== Vertebrate fossils ===
==== Actinopterygii ====
Ray-finned fish reported from the Hasandong Formation
Genus	Species	Location	Stratigraphic position	Material	Notes	Images
Sinamia	S. sp.			Partial Skeleton		
Lepidotes	L. sp.			Partial Skeleton		

==== Testudines ====
Shell fragments of testudines have been discovered.

Turtles reported from the Hasandong Formation
Genus	Species	Location	Stratigraphic position	Material	Notes	Images
Byeoljubuchelys	B. yeosuensis			Nearly complete carapace and plastron and associated post-cranial bones	A carettochelyid turtle	
Proadocus	P. hadongensis			Partial Skeleton	An adocid turtle	

==== Crocodylomorpha ====
Several teeth remain have been reported but are not assigned to the specific clade.

Crocodylomorphs reported from the Hasandong Formation
Genus	Species	Location	Stratigraphic position	Material	Notes	Images
"Hadongsuchus"	"H. acerdentis"			Skull	nomen nudum	

==== Pterosaurs ====
Pterosaurs reported from the Hasandong Formation
Genus	Species	Location	Stratigraphic position	Material	Notes	Images
Pterodactyloidea	Indeterminate			Teeth and a partial second wing phalanx	Dental remains belong to either Boreopteridae or Anhanguerian	
Dsungaripterus	D.? cf. D. weii			Incomplete wing phalanx belonging to Dsungaripteridae		

==== Dinosaurs ====
Several indeterminate theropod teeth remains have been reported.

Dinosaurs reported from the Hasandong Formation
Genus	Species	Location	Stratigraphic position	Material	Notes	Images
Carcharodontosauridae	Indeterminate			Teeth	Some dental remains show similarities with Acrocanthosaurus	
Hadrosauroidea	Indeterminate			Tooth		
Titanosauriformes	Indeterminate			A partial skeleton and several teeth showing different morphotypes	Includes Chiayusaurus sp. and Pukyongosaurus milleniumi, both of which are nomen dubium	
Tyrannosauroidea	Indeterminate			Tooth, estimated crown length ~18mm		

==== Eggs ====
Unnamed dinosaur egg fossils have been reported.

Eggs reported from the Hasandong Formation
Genus	Species	Location	Stratigraphic position	Material	Notes	Images
Testudoolithus	T. aff. curiosa				Turtle eggs	

=== Ichnofossils ===
Tracks of theropods, sauropods and ornithopods have been discovered from the formation. Possible amphibian tracks are also known.

Ichnofossils reported from the Hasandong Formation
Genus	Species	Location	Stratigraphic position	Material	Notes	Images
Pteraichnus	P. koreanensis				Pterosaur tracks	
Sauripes	S. hadongensis				The oldest lizard tracks showing possible bipedalism, though potentially a nomen dubium due to insufficient description and problematic holotype designation	
Diplocraterion	D. luniforme					
Beaconites	B. coronus					
Circulichnus	C. montanus					
Cochlichnus	C. anguineus					
Chondrites	C. isp.					
Helminthopsis	H. abeli & H. hieroglyphica					
Laevicyclus	L. isp.					
Planolites	P. annularius, P. beverleyensis & P. montanus					
Skolithos	S. magnus, S. verticalis & S. isp.					
Spirodesmos	S. isp.					
Taenidium	T. barretti					
Thalassinoides	T. paradoxicus & T. suevicus					

=== Paleoflora ===
Macroflora of the Hasandong Formation suggests a shift toward seasonally semiarid conditions, dominated by conifers, compared to the underlying Nakdong Formation.

Plants reported from the Hasandong Formation
Genus	Species	Location	Stratigraphic position	Material	Notes	Images
Brachyphyllum	B. japonicum				Conifer with an unknown systematic position	
Cladophlebis	C. denticulata					
Cladophlebis	C. (Eboracia?) lobifolia					
Cladophlebis	C. (Klukia?) koraiensis					
Cladophlebis	C. shinshuensis					
Elatocladus	E. tennerima				Conifer with an unknown systematic position	
Onychiopsis	O. elongata				Leptosporangiate fern	
Ptilophyllum	P. sp.				Bennettitales (extinct order of seed plants)	
Ruffordia	R. sp.				Schizaeaceae ferns	
Taeniopteris	T.? sp. cf. T. auriculata				The specific systematic position of this form genus is unknown.	
Thallites	T. yabei				Liverwort	

== Photo ==
Hasandong Formation in Uiseong County
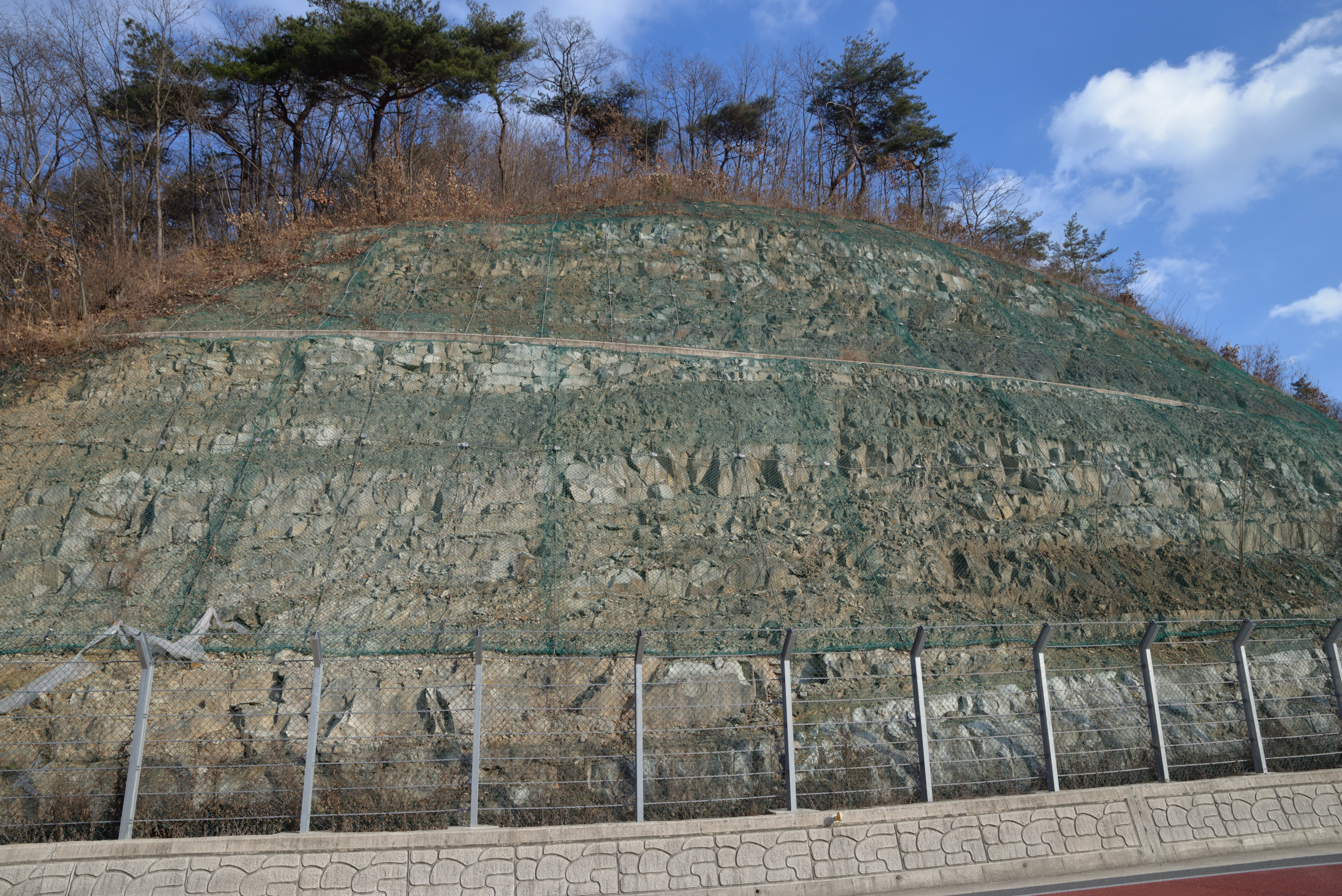
36°27′10.0″N 128°30′40.0″E

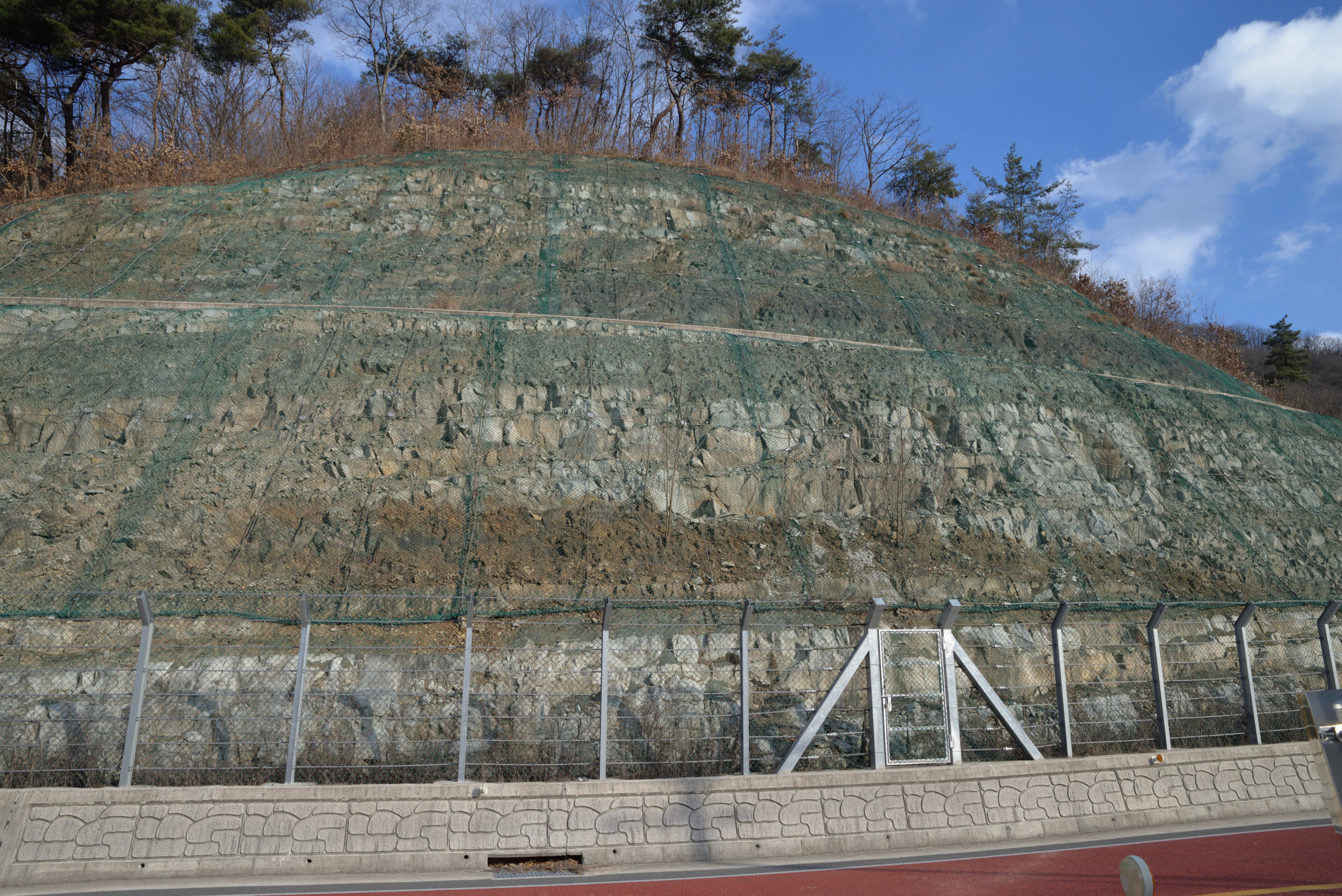

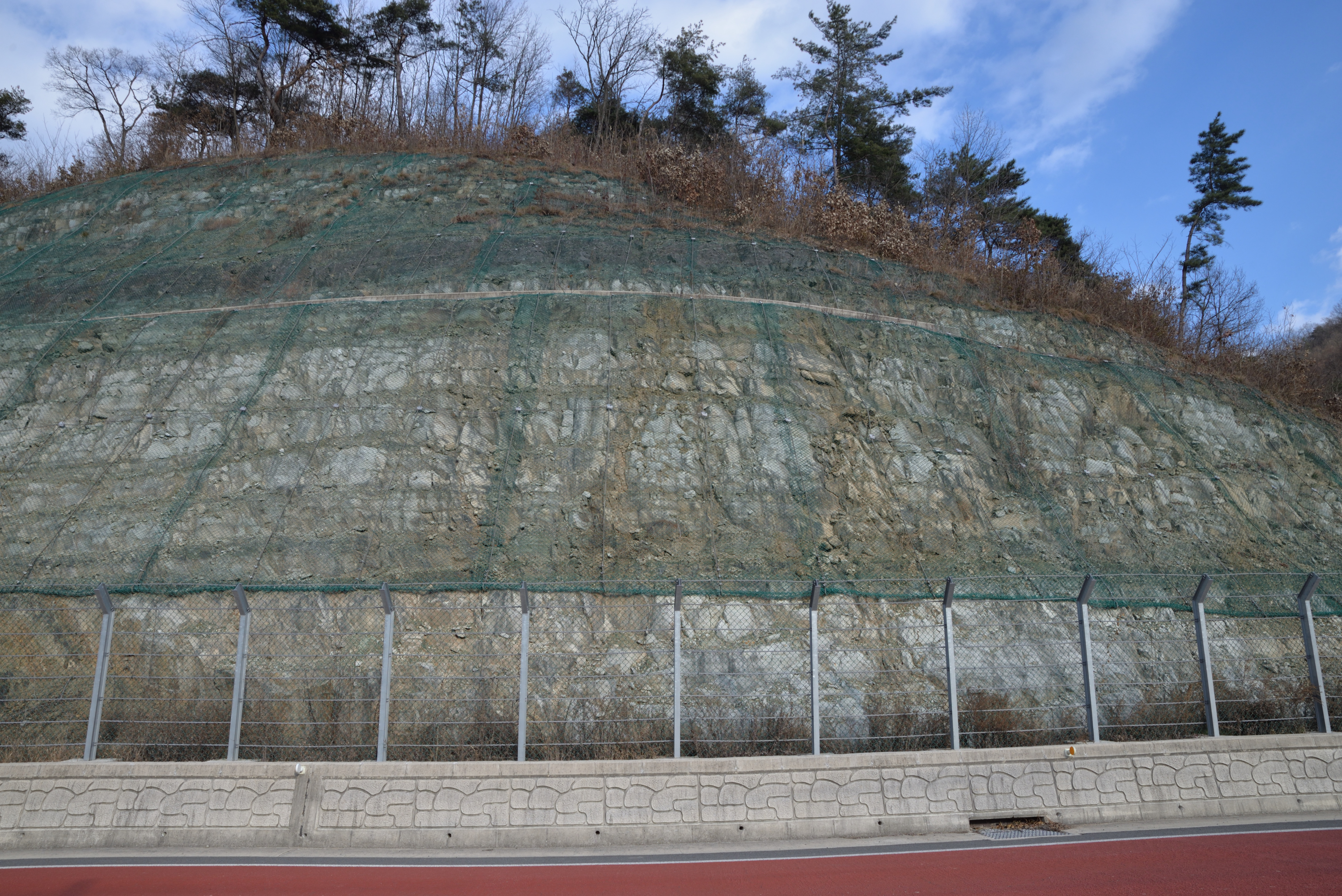

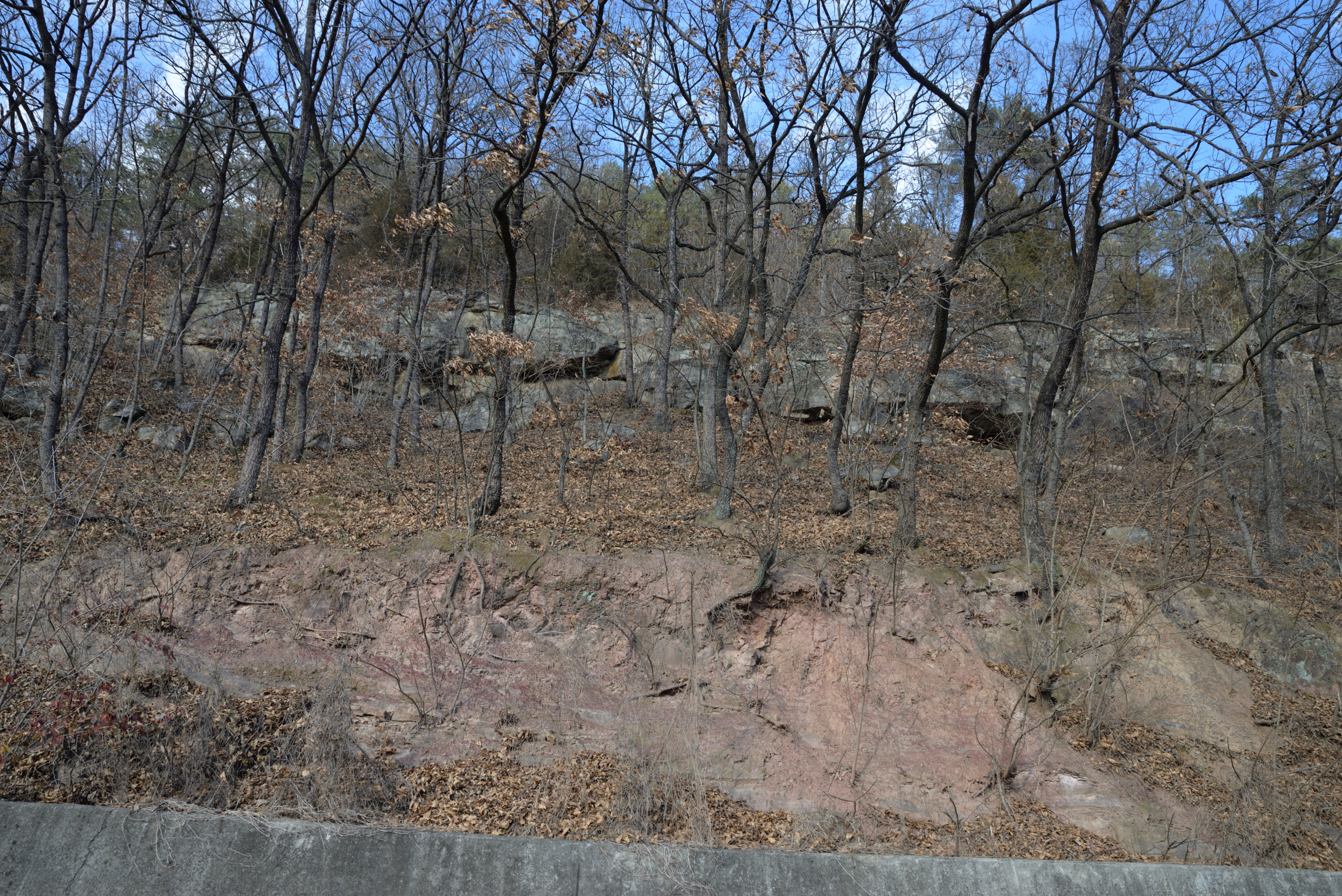
Boundary of Hasandong Formation (under) and Jinju Formation (upper)
36°24′04.0″N 128°32′40.0″E

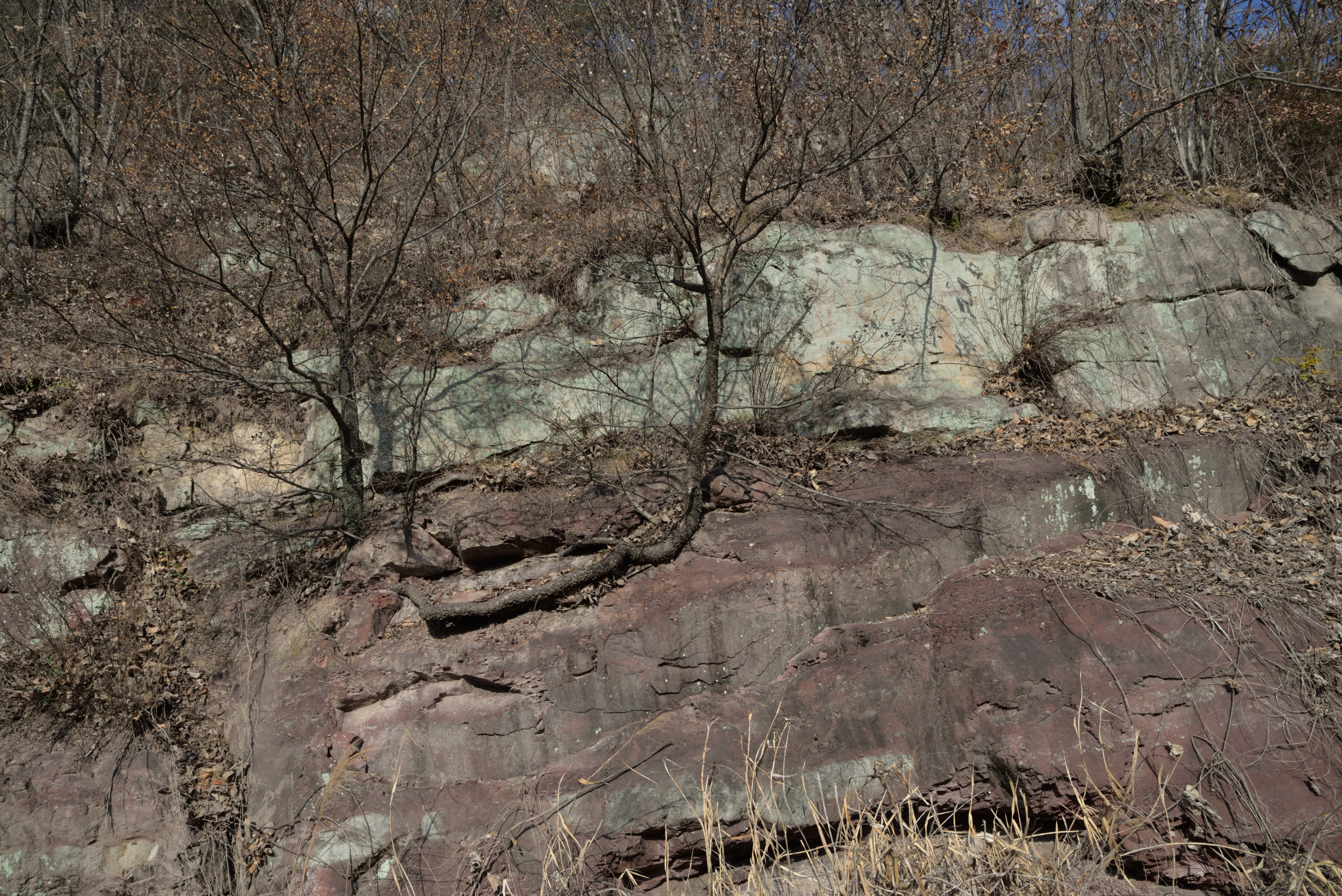

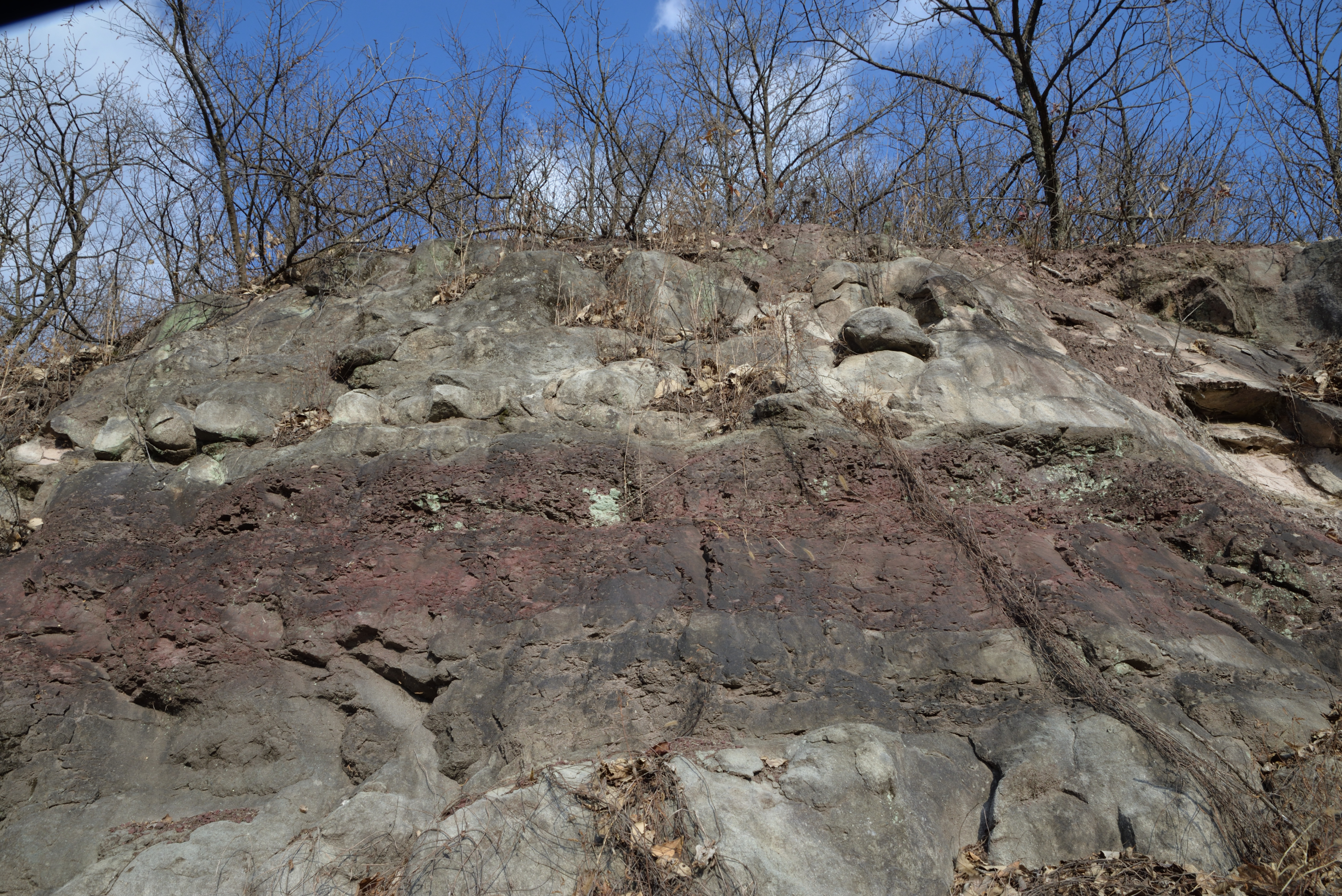
Seaside Hasandong Formation in Sulsang-Yangpo Area, Jingyo District, Hadong County
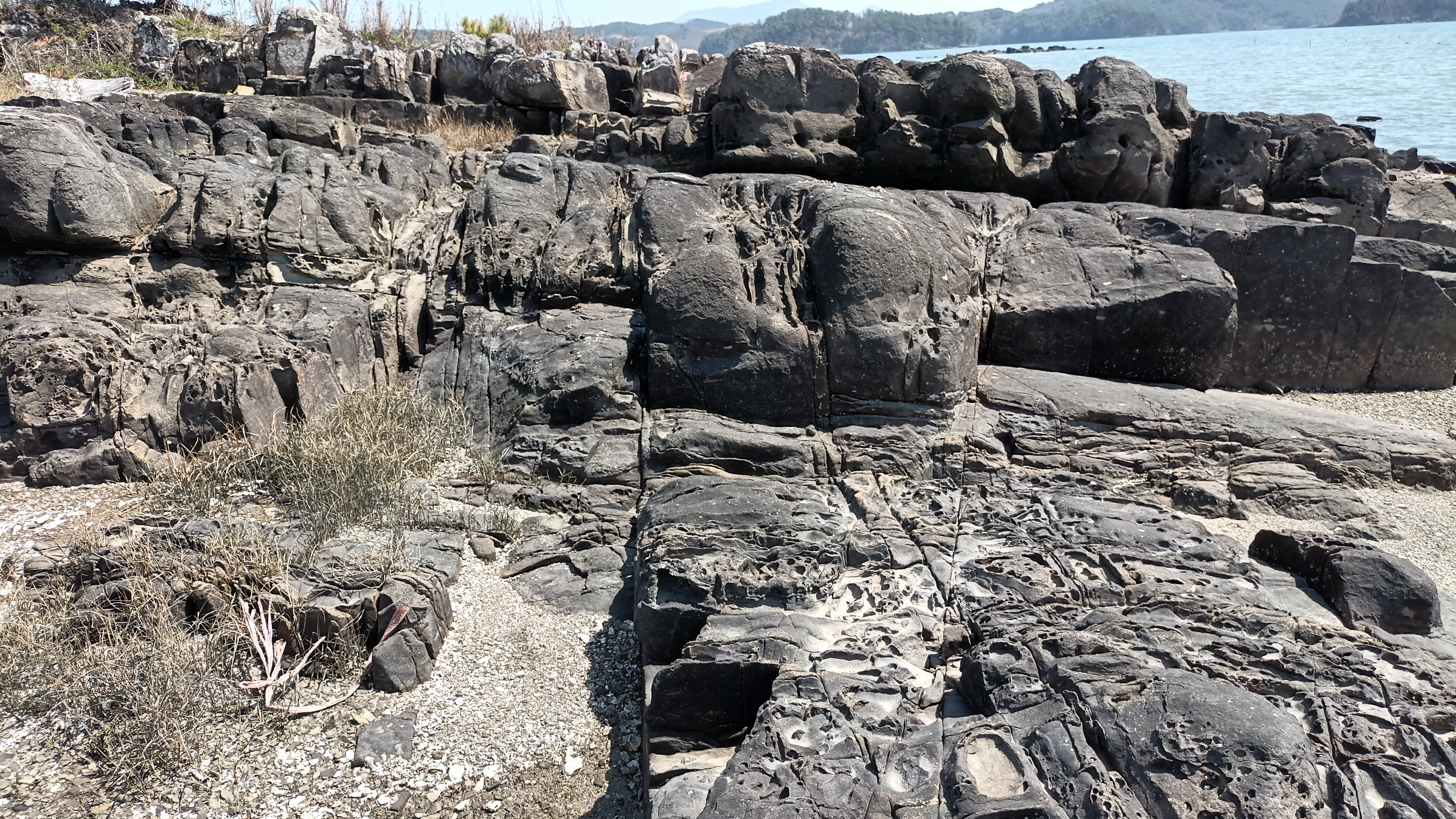
35°00′15.8″N 127°55′16.7″E

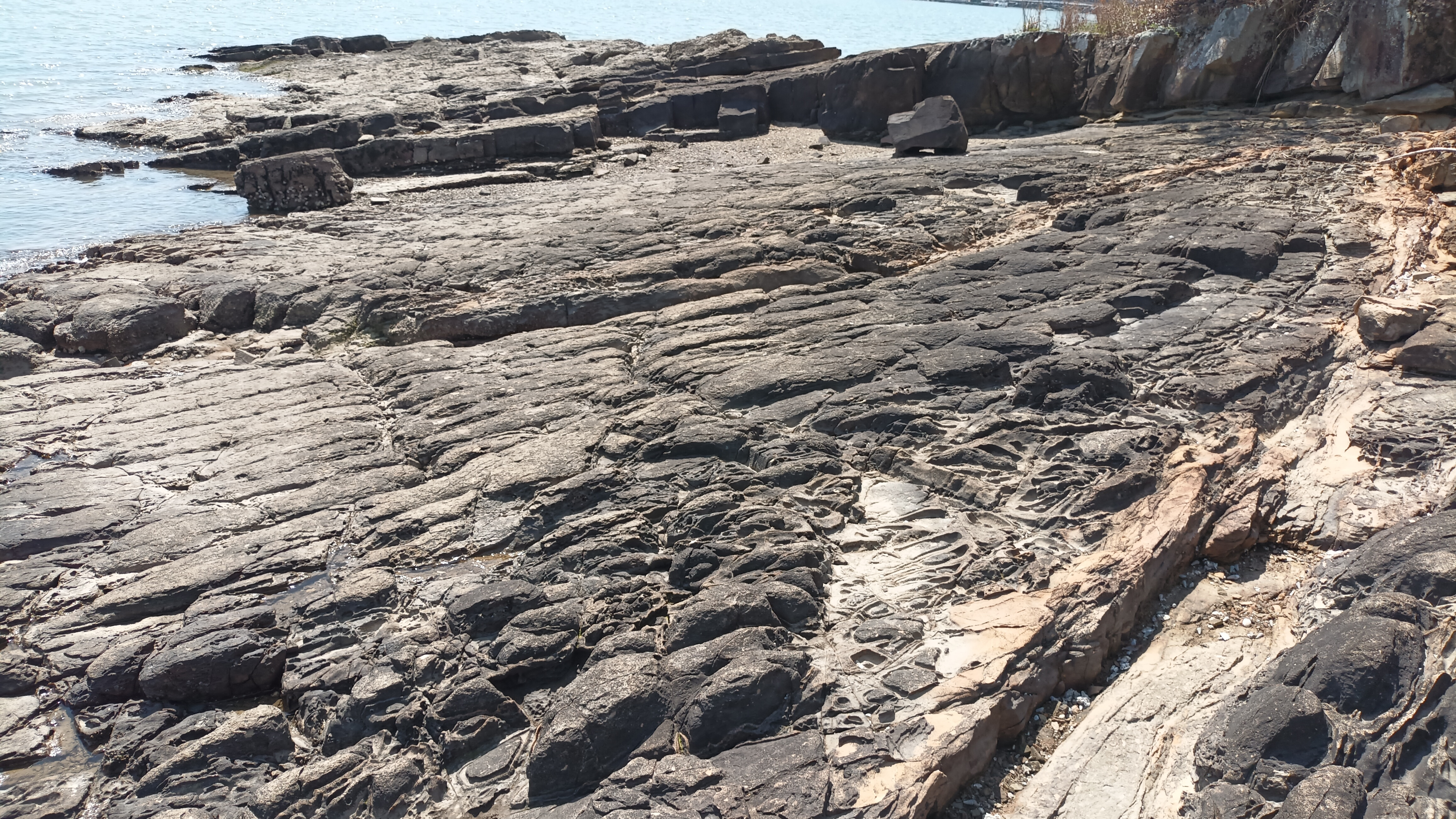
35°00′15.7″N 127°55′17.7″E

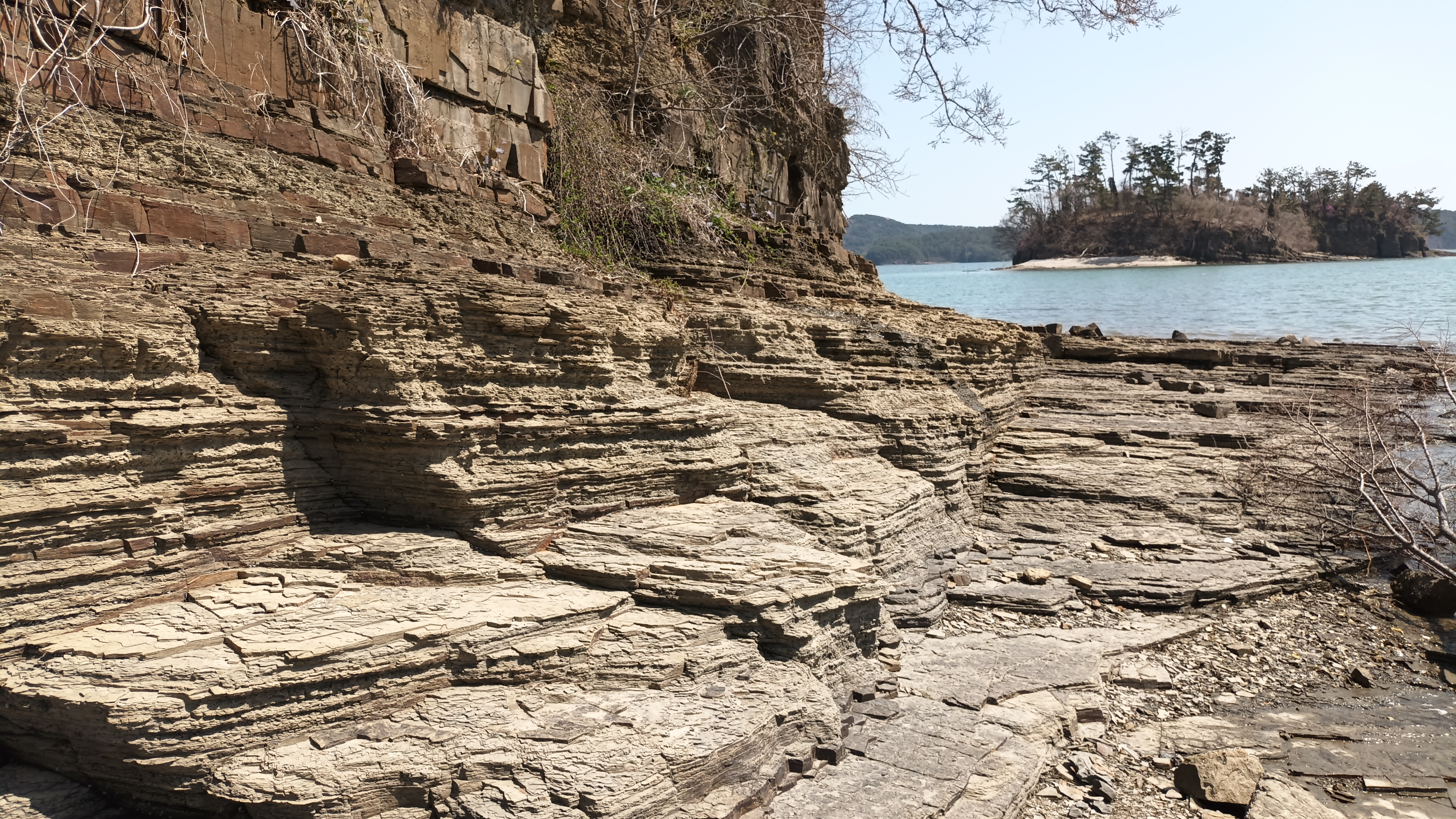
34°59′59.6″N 127°55′08.2″E

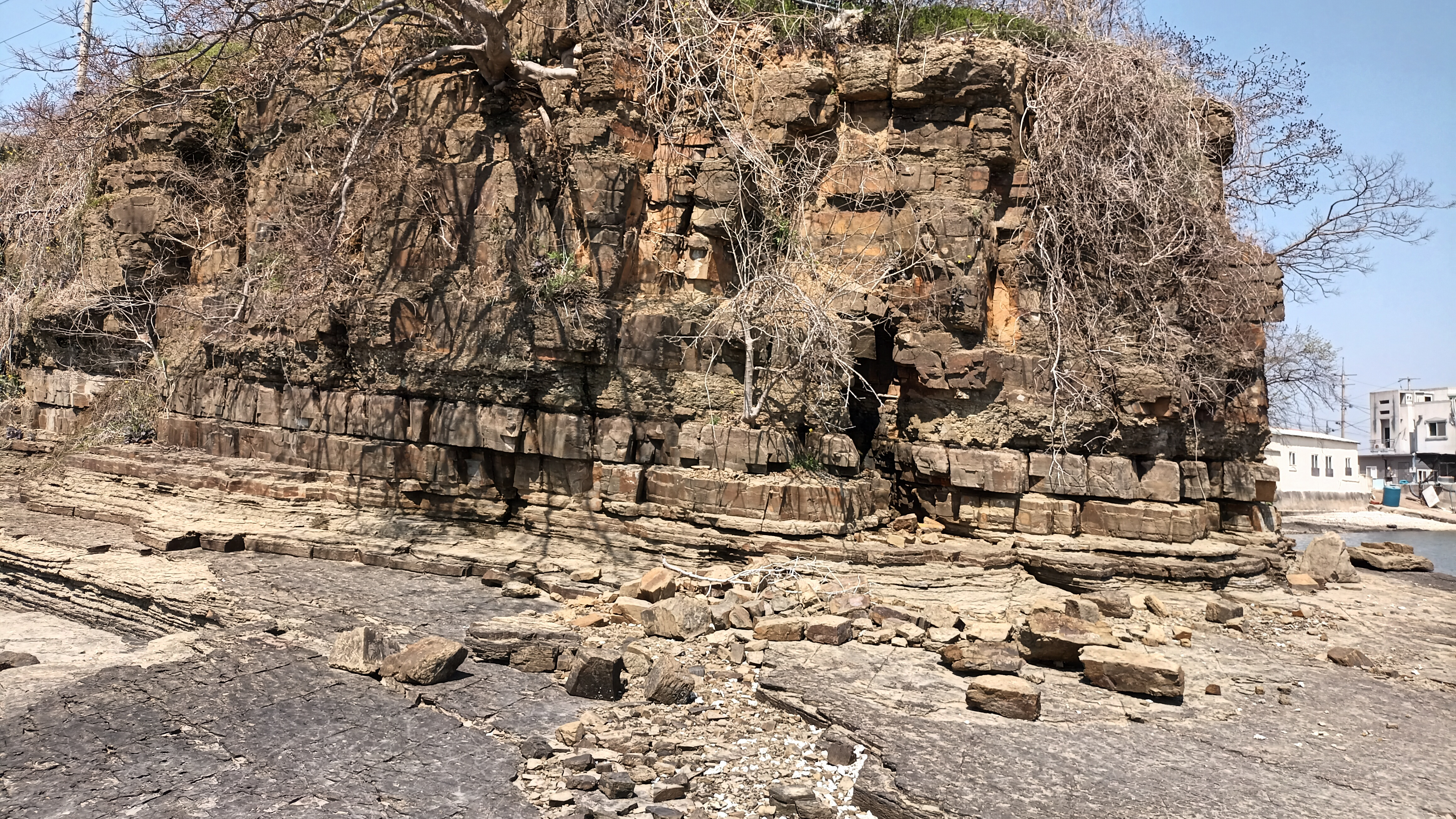
35°00′02.8″N 127°55′10.0″E

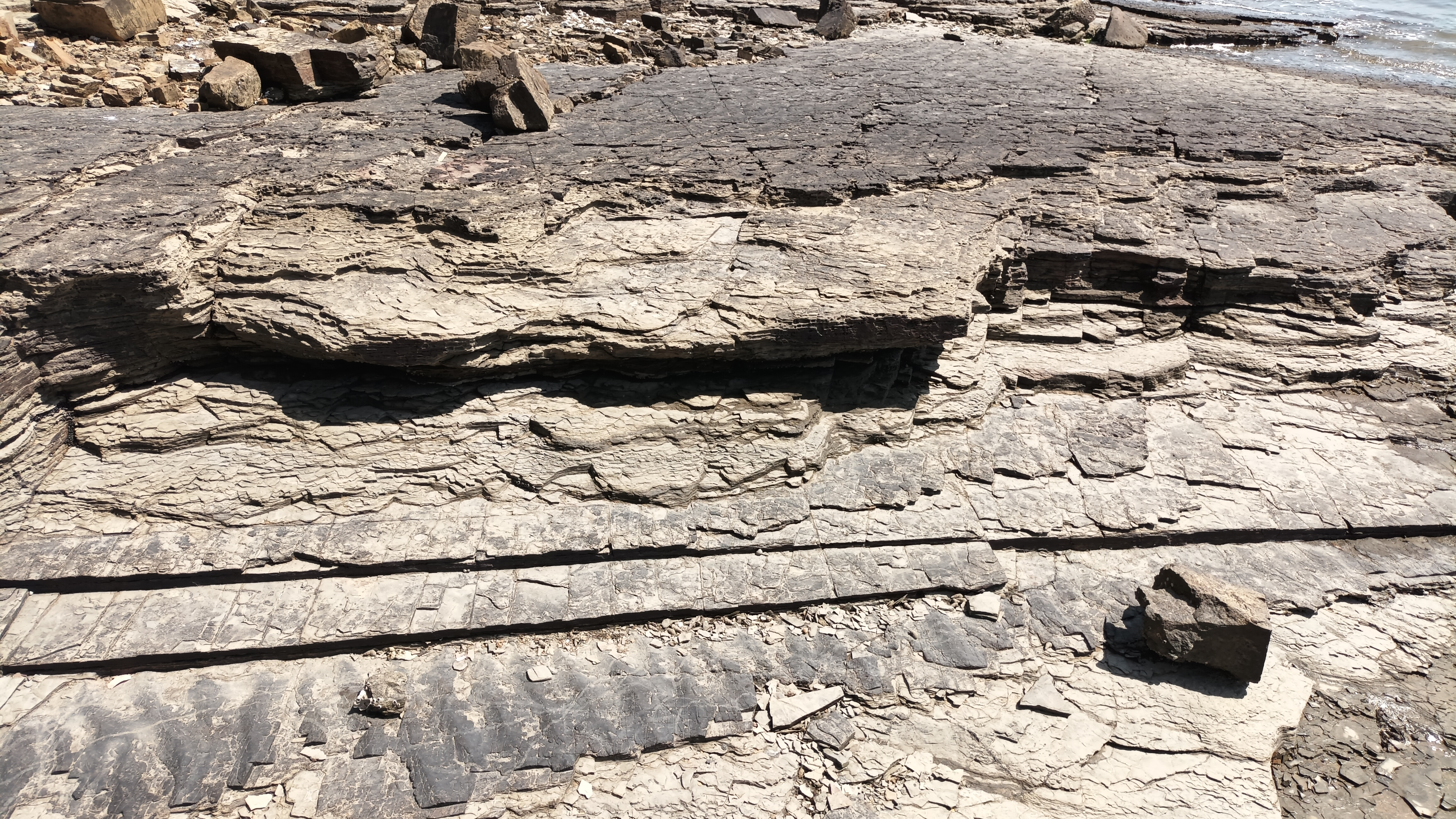
Ripple marks 35°00′02.0″N 127°55′09.6″E

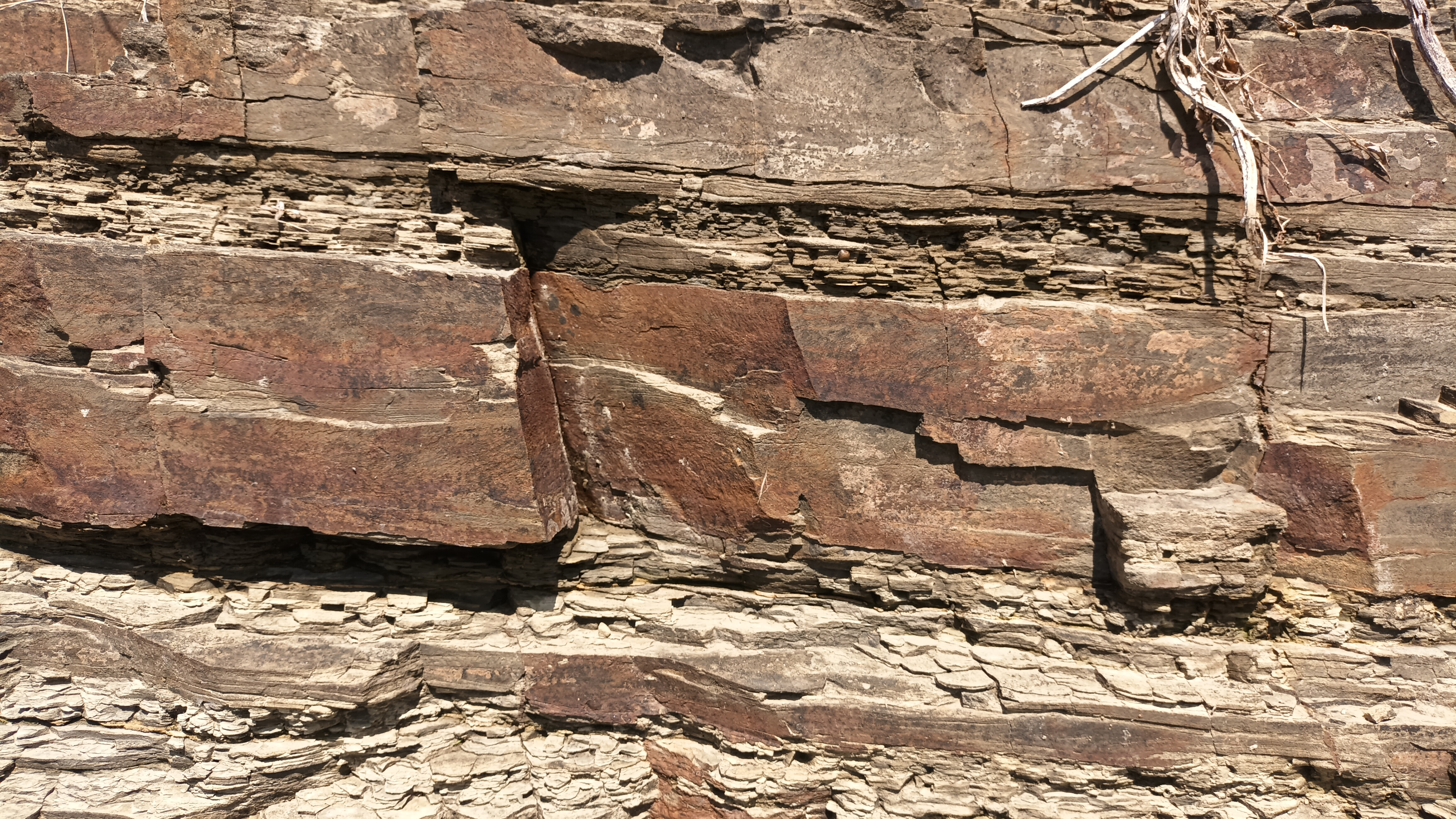
Normal Faults 34°59′59.6″N 127°55′08.1″E

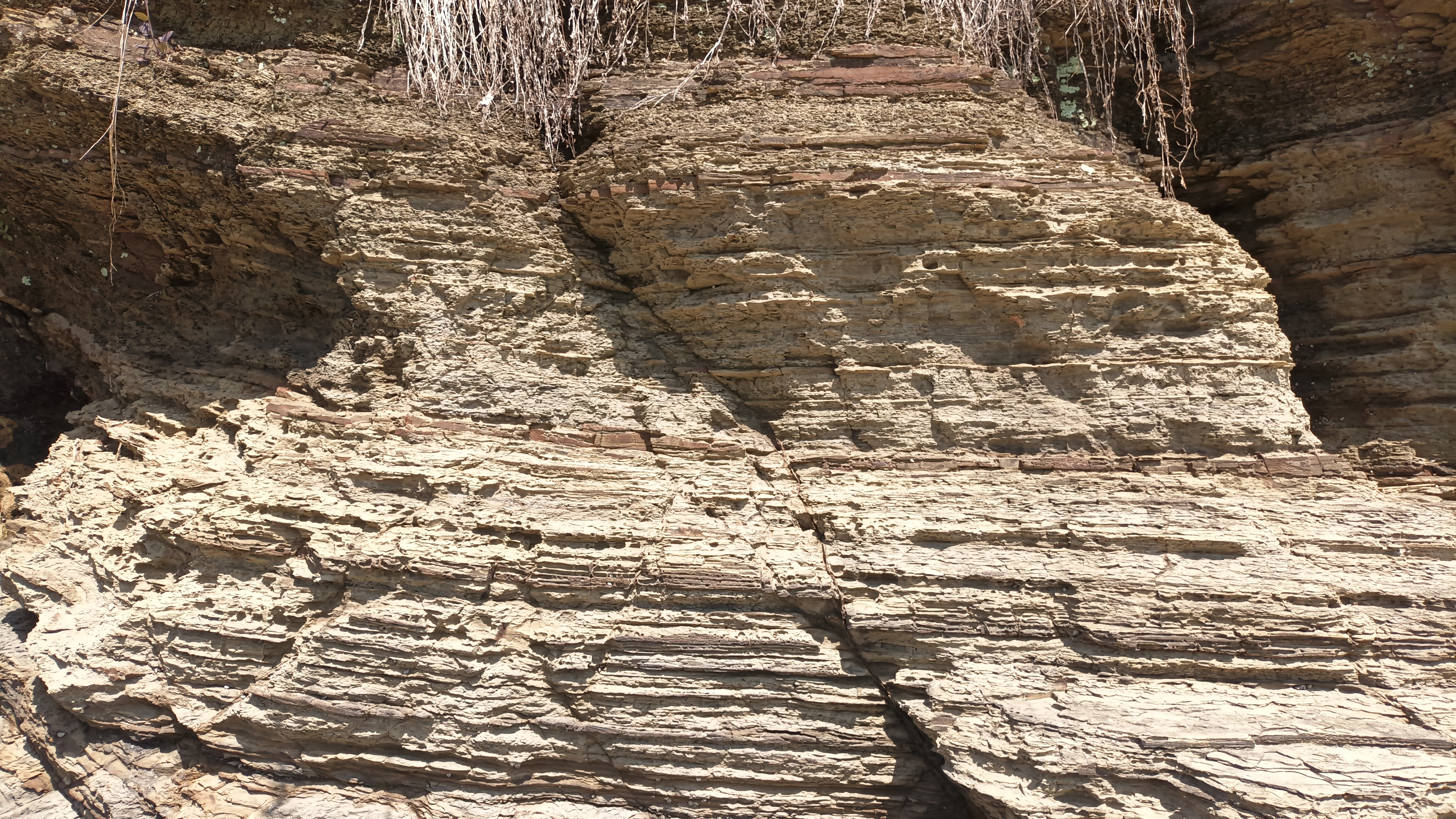
34°59′59.7″N 127°55′08.1″E

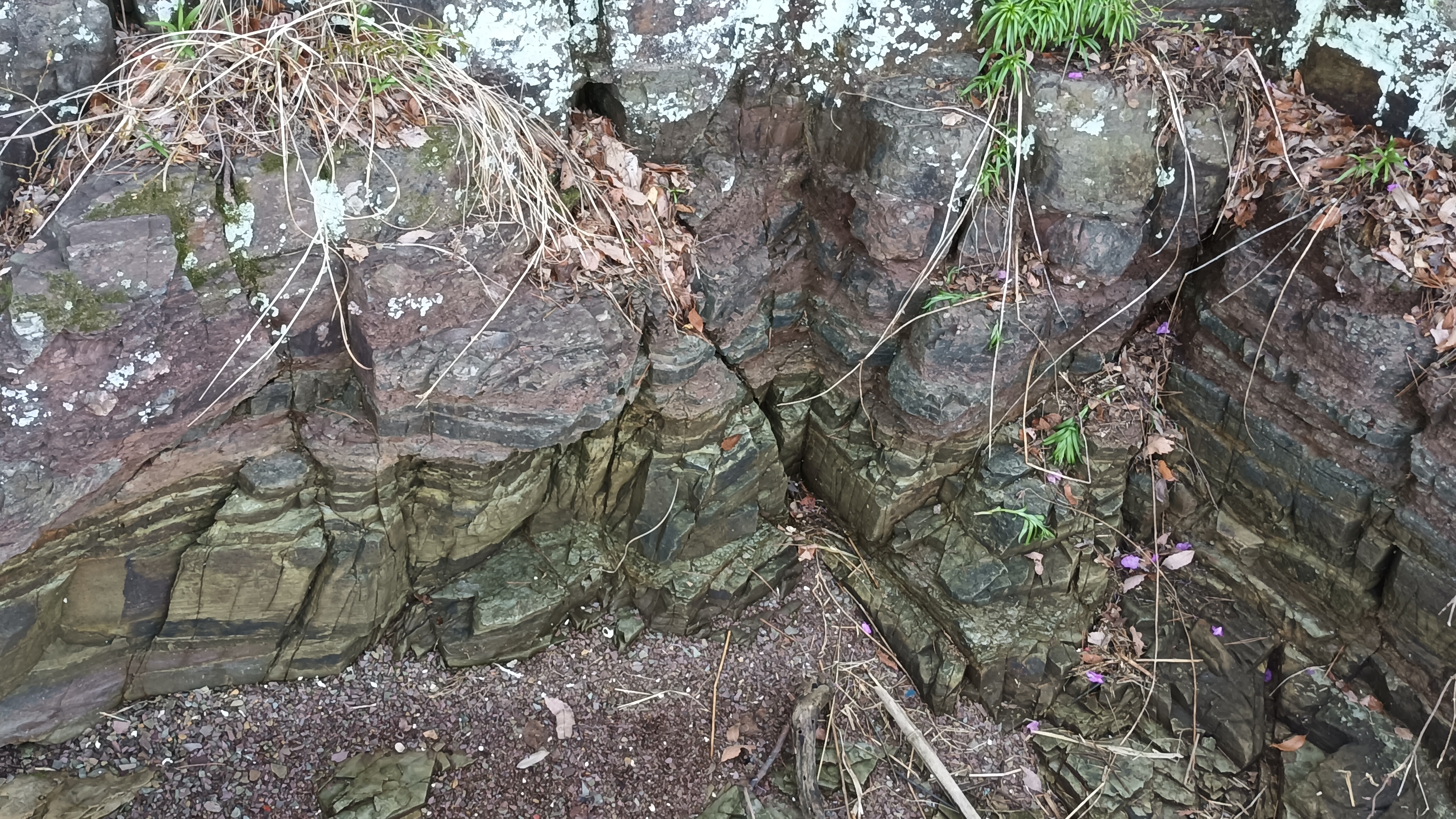
34°59′23.9″N 127°55′09.1″E
Seaside Hasandong Formation in Daechiri Area, Geumnam District, Hadong County
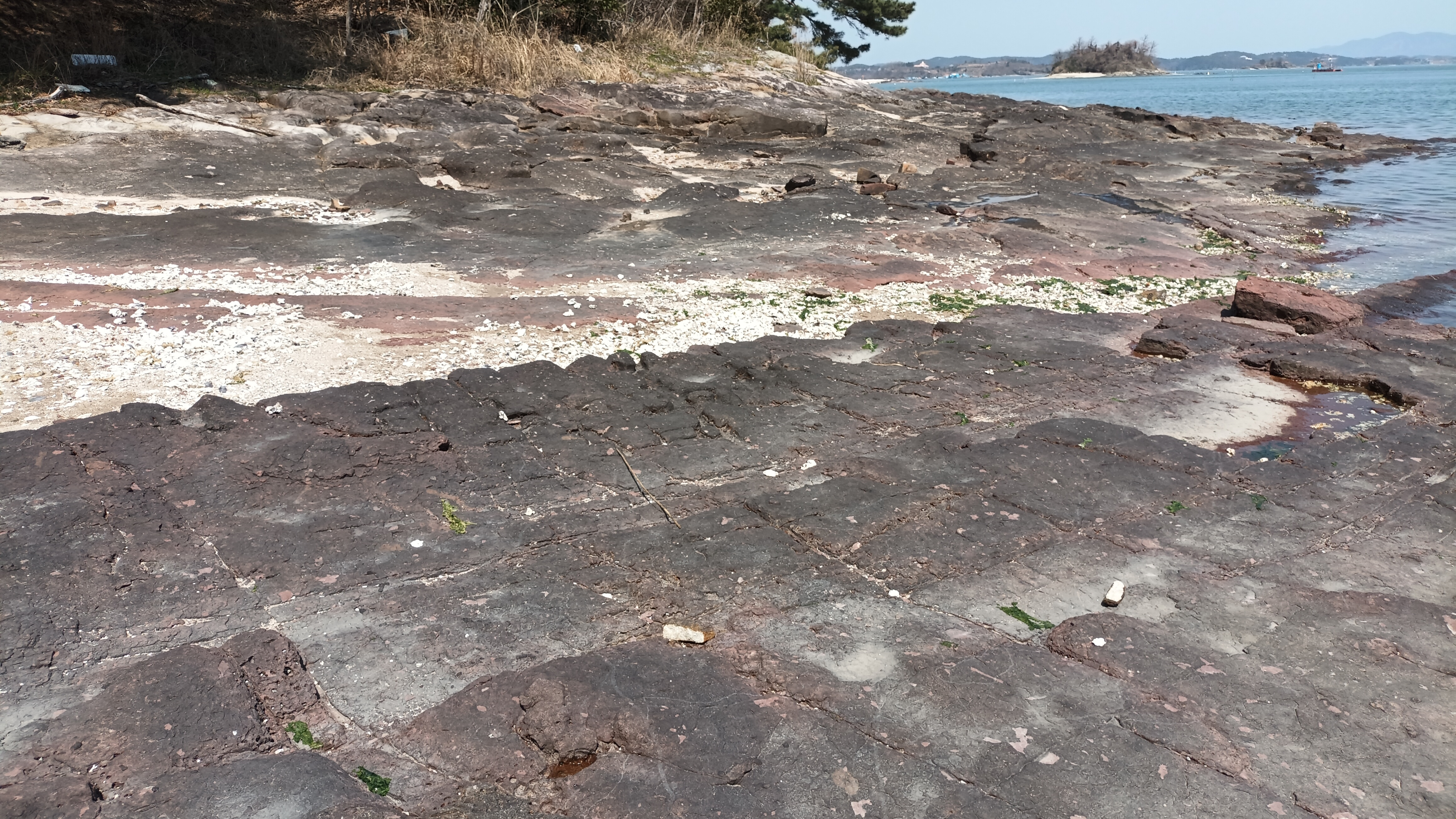
34°57′31.2″N 127°53′52.6″E

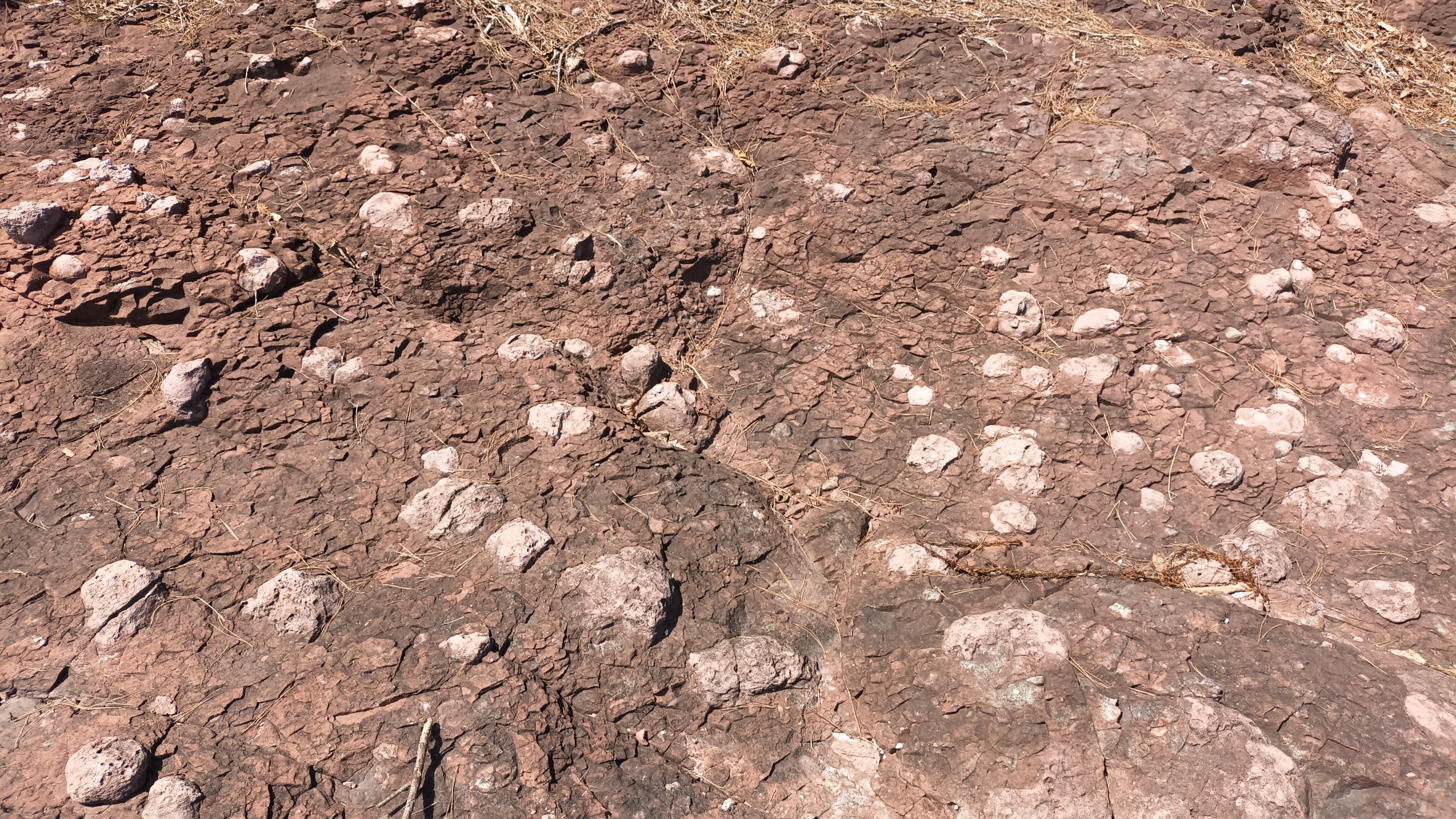
34°57′32.9″N 127°53′53.8″E

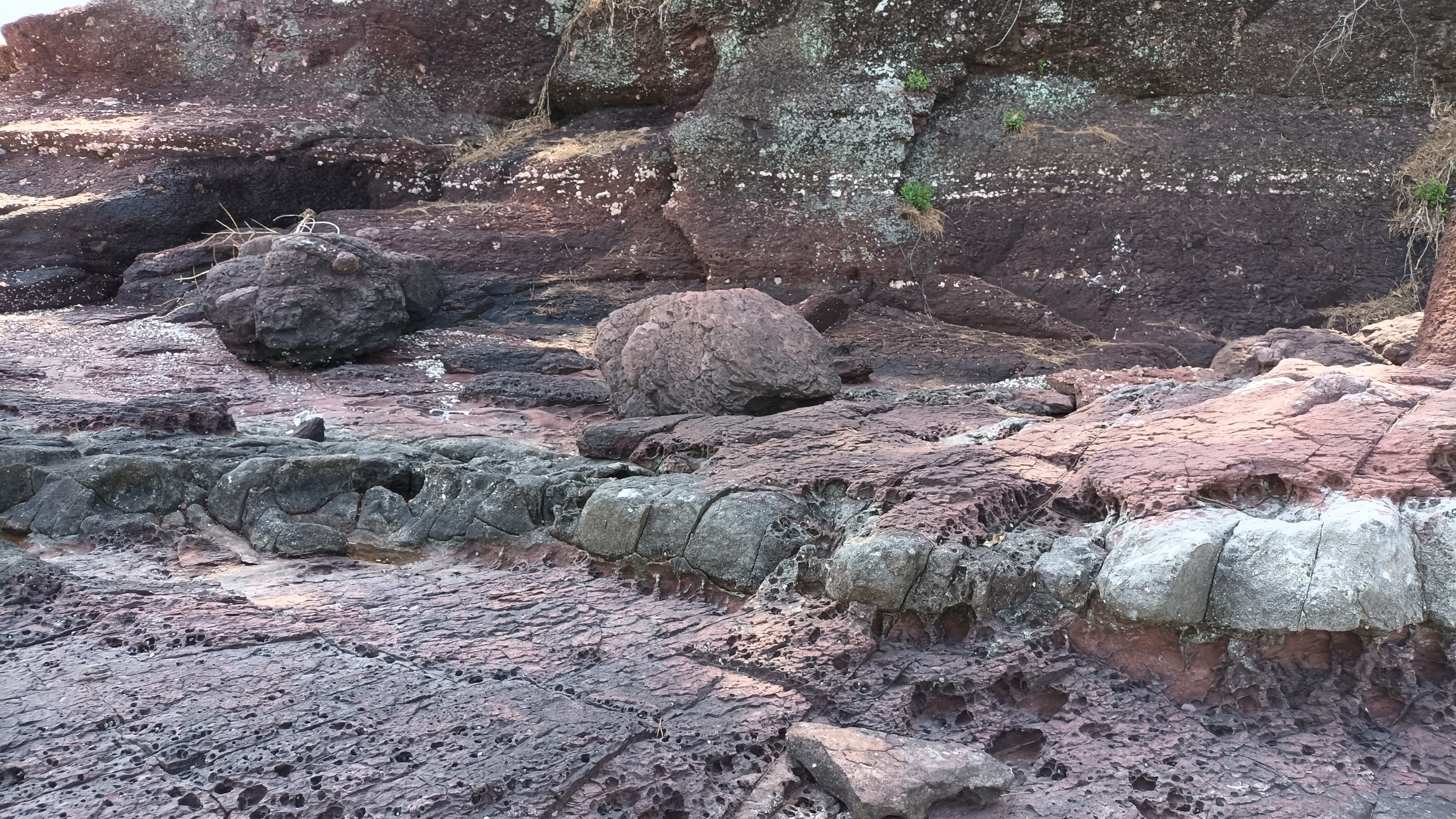
34°57′33.8″N 127°53′53.9″E

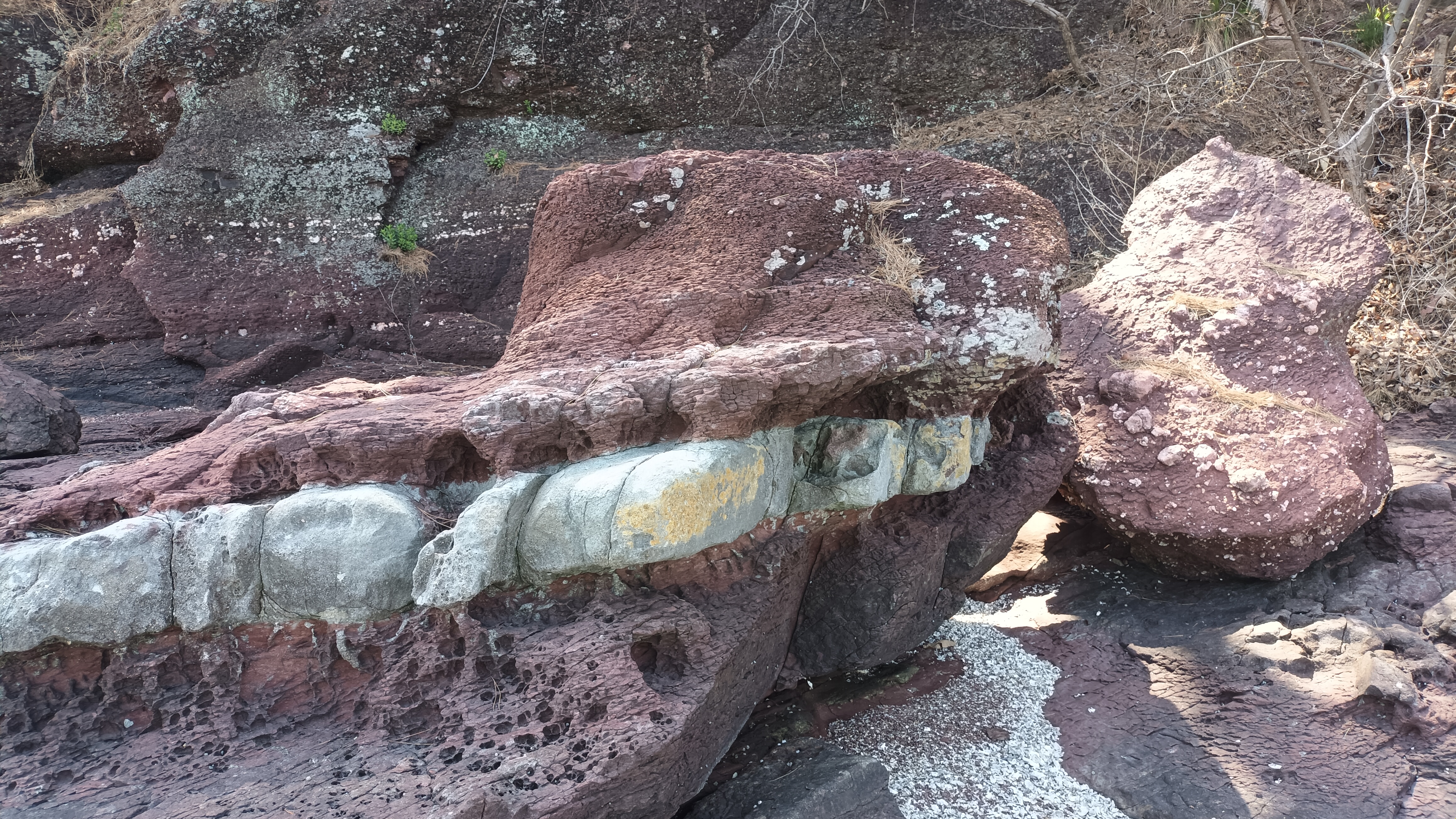
34°57′33.8″N 127°53′53.9″E

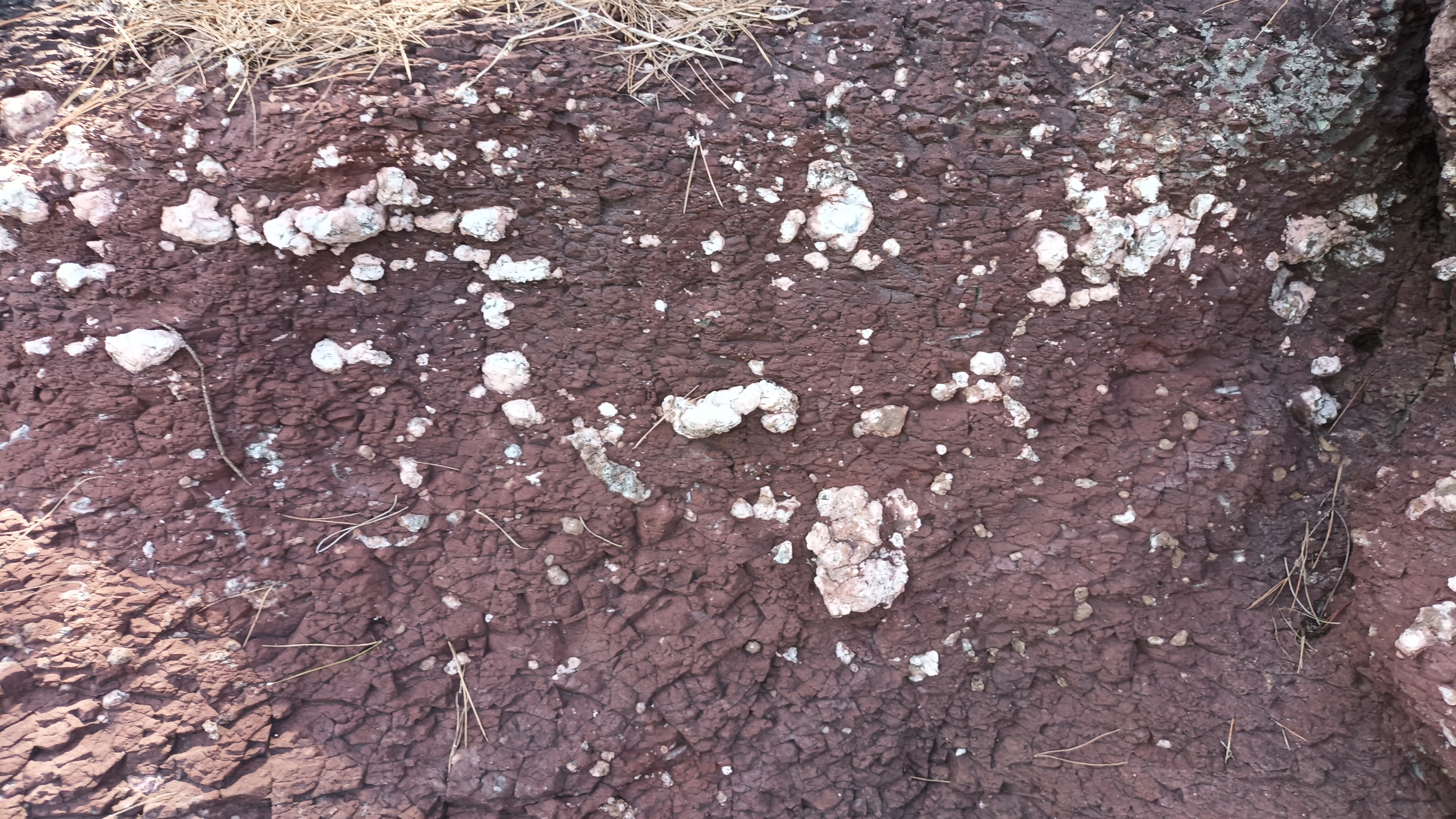
34°57′34.1″N 127°53′53.8″E

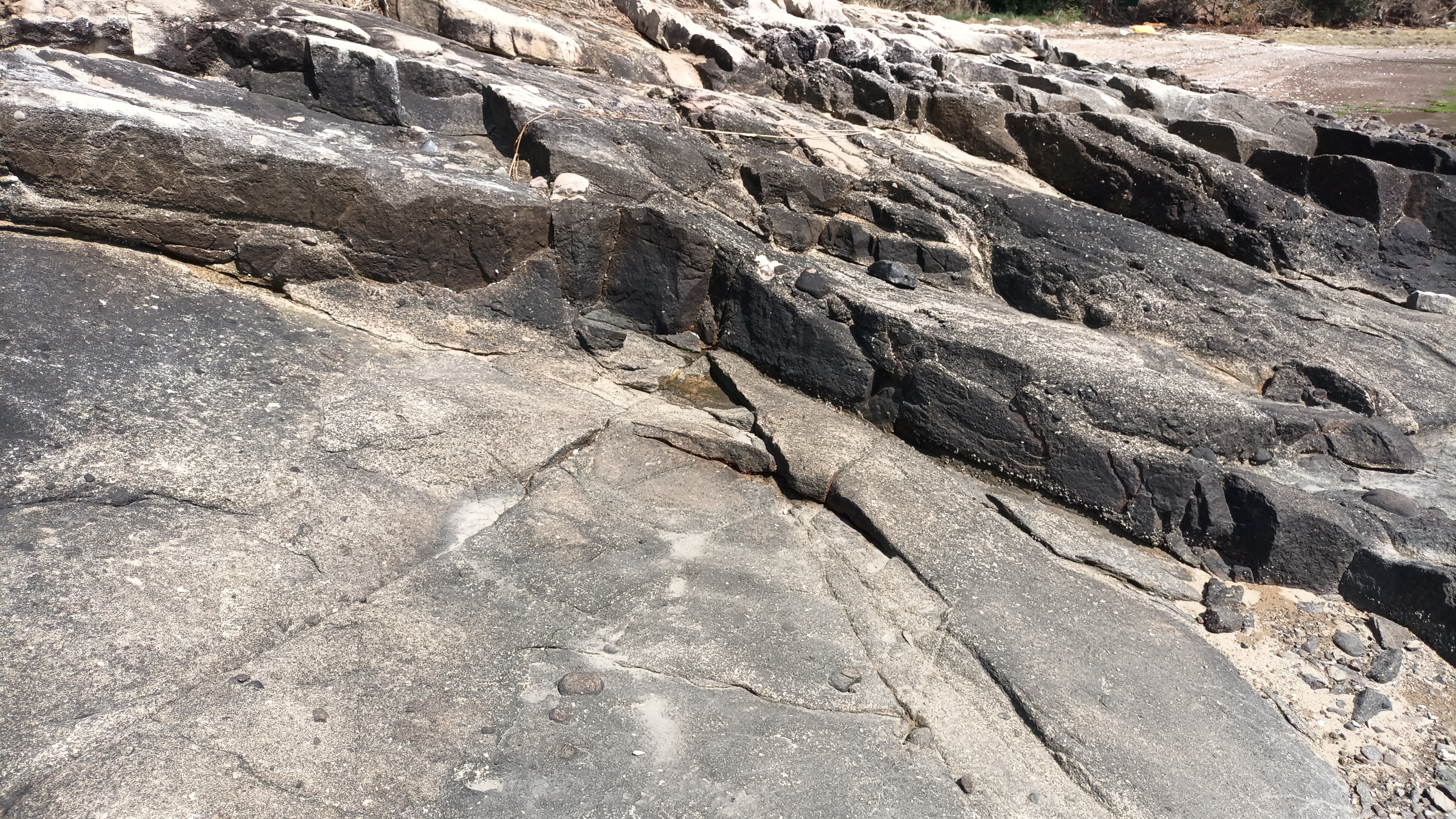
34°57′29.6″N 127°53′41.0″E

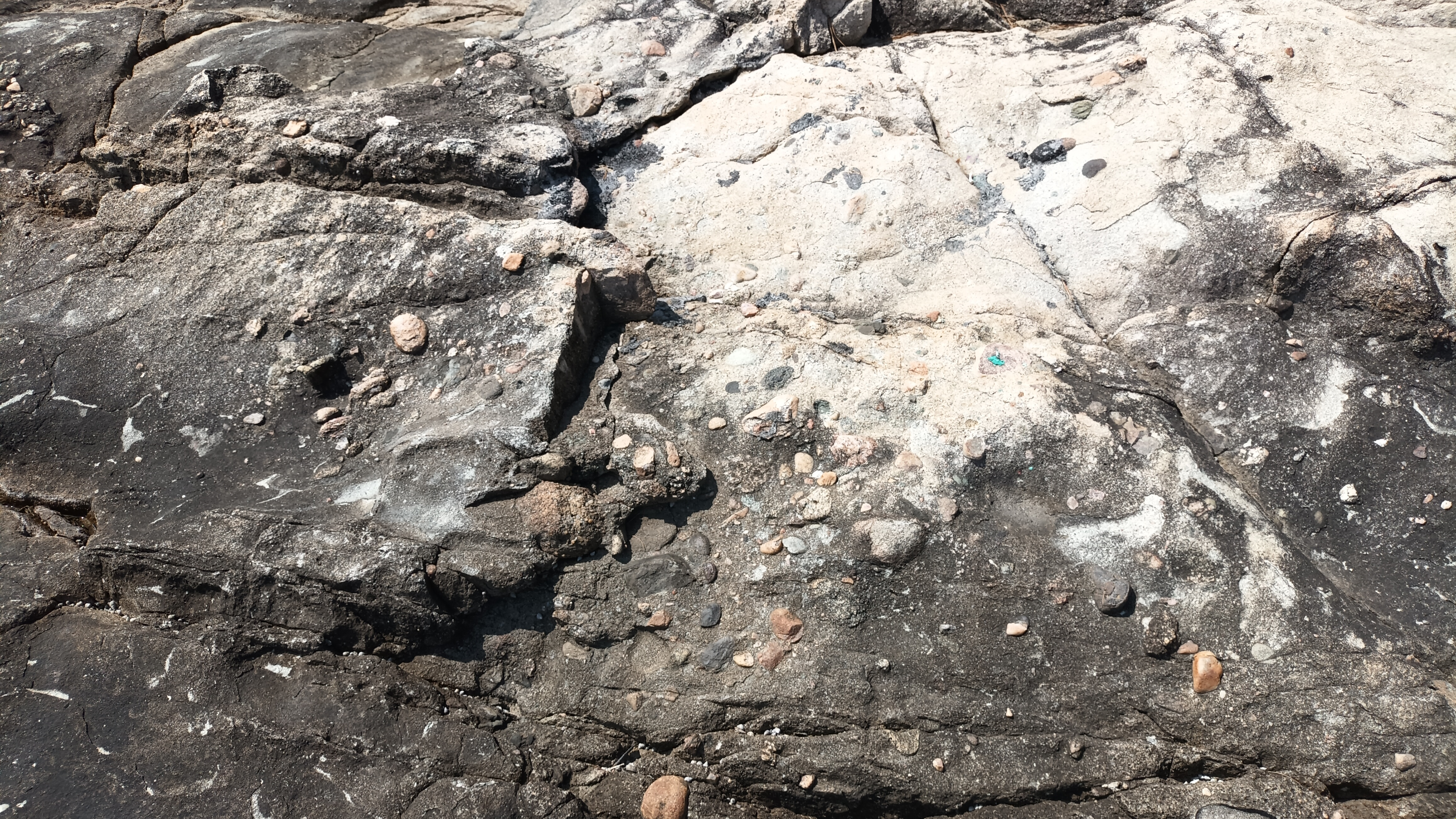
34°57′29.3″N 127°53′39.9″E

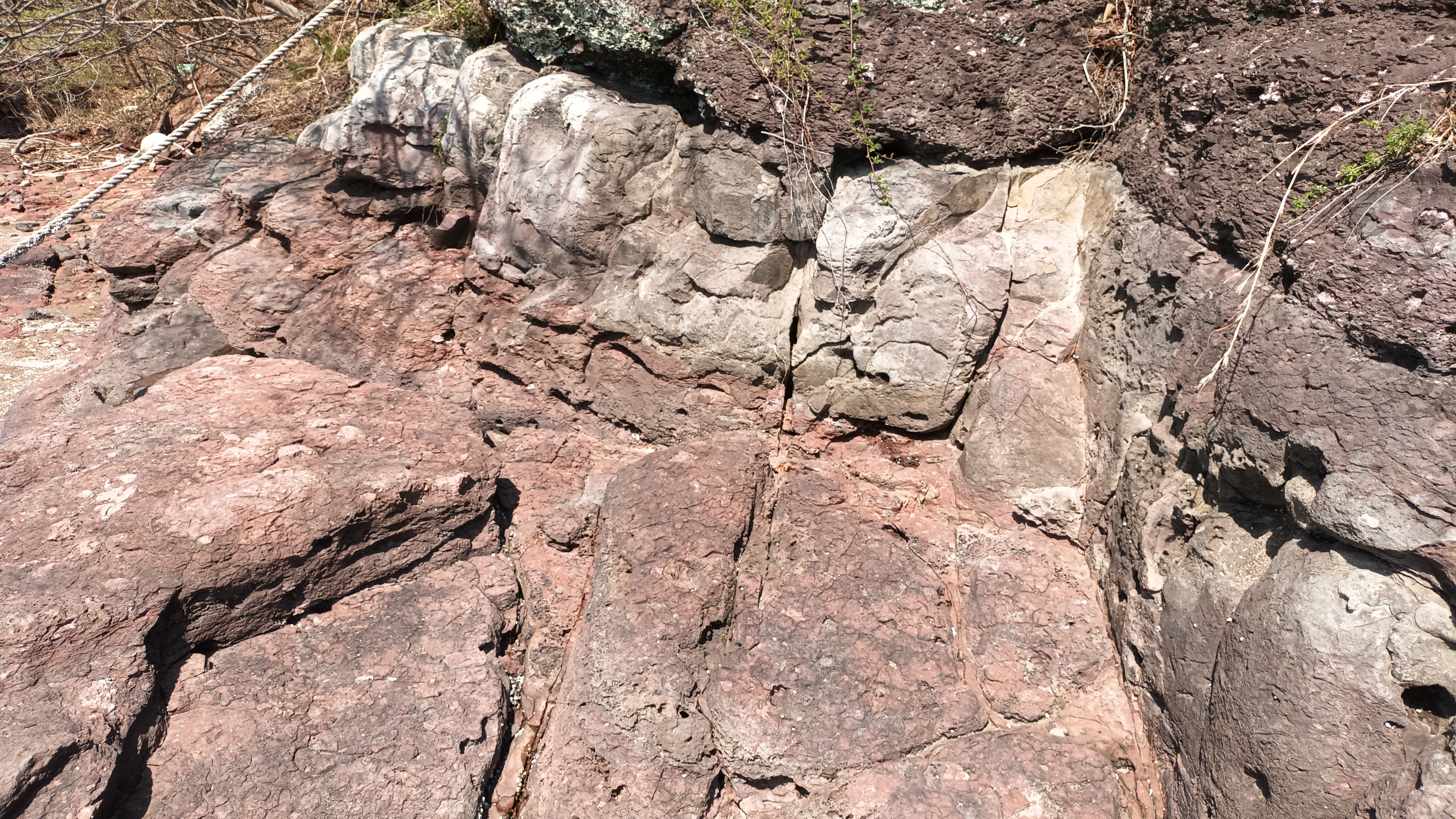
34°57′27.3″N 127°53′43.0″E

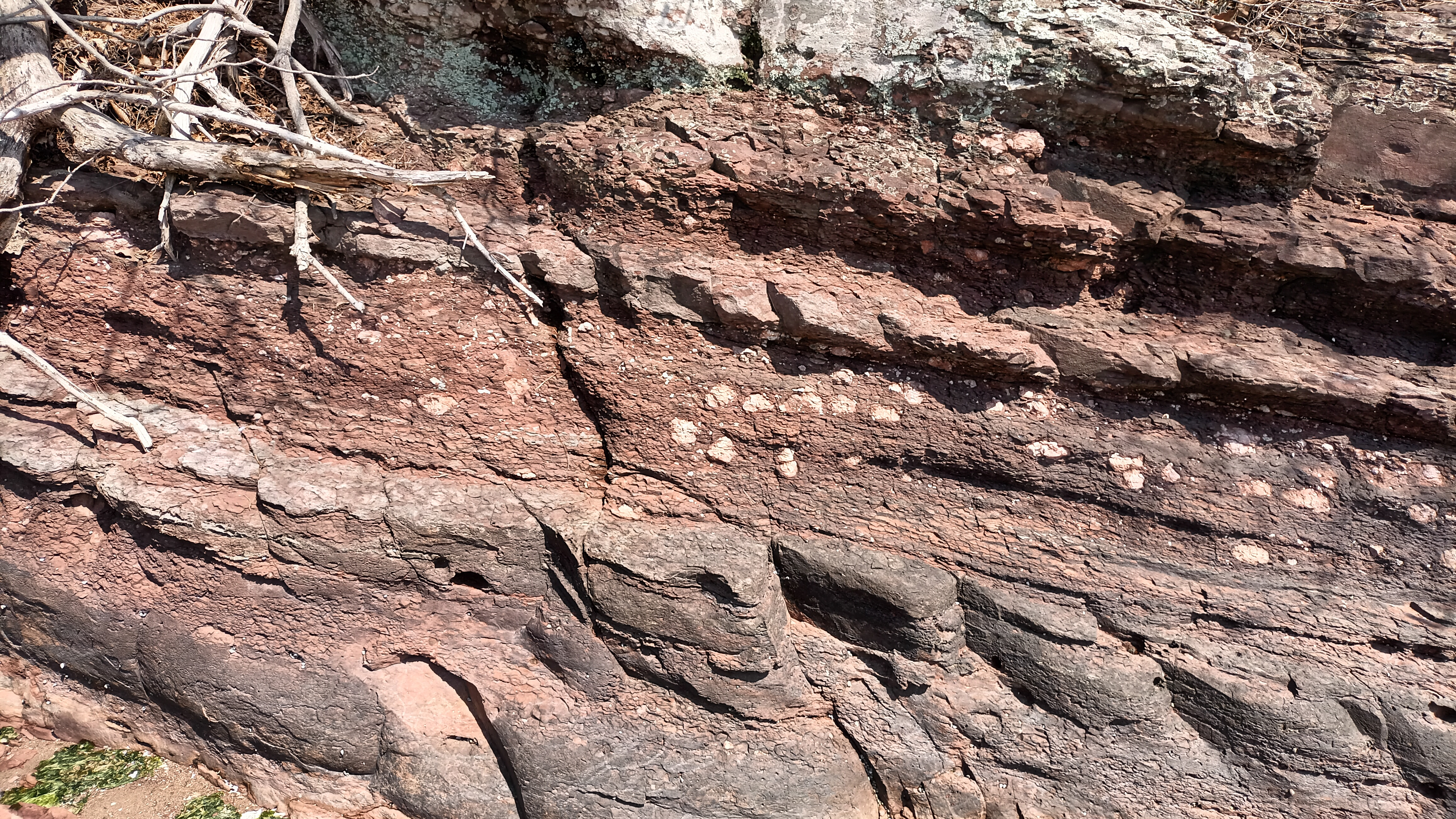
34°57′27.4″N 127°53′43.0″E

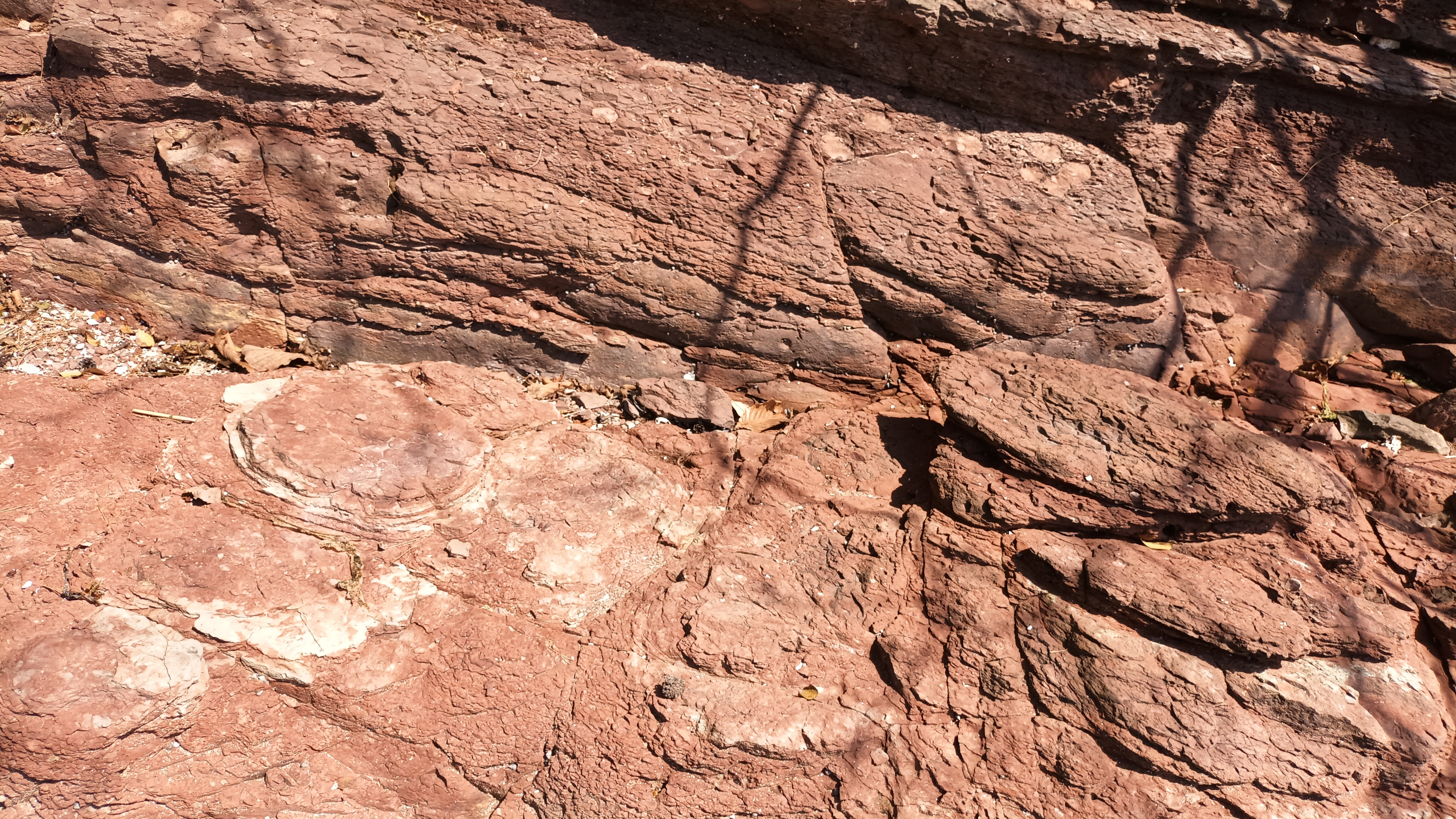
34°57′27.0″N 127°53′43.1″E
Seaside Hasandong Formation in Songmunri Area, Geumnam District, Hadong County
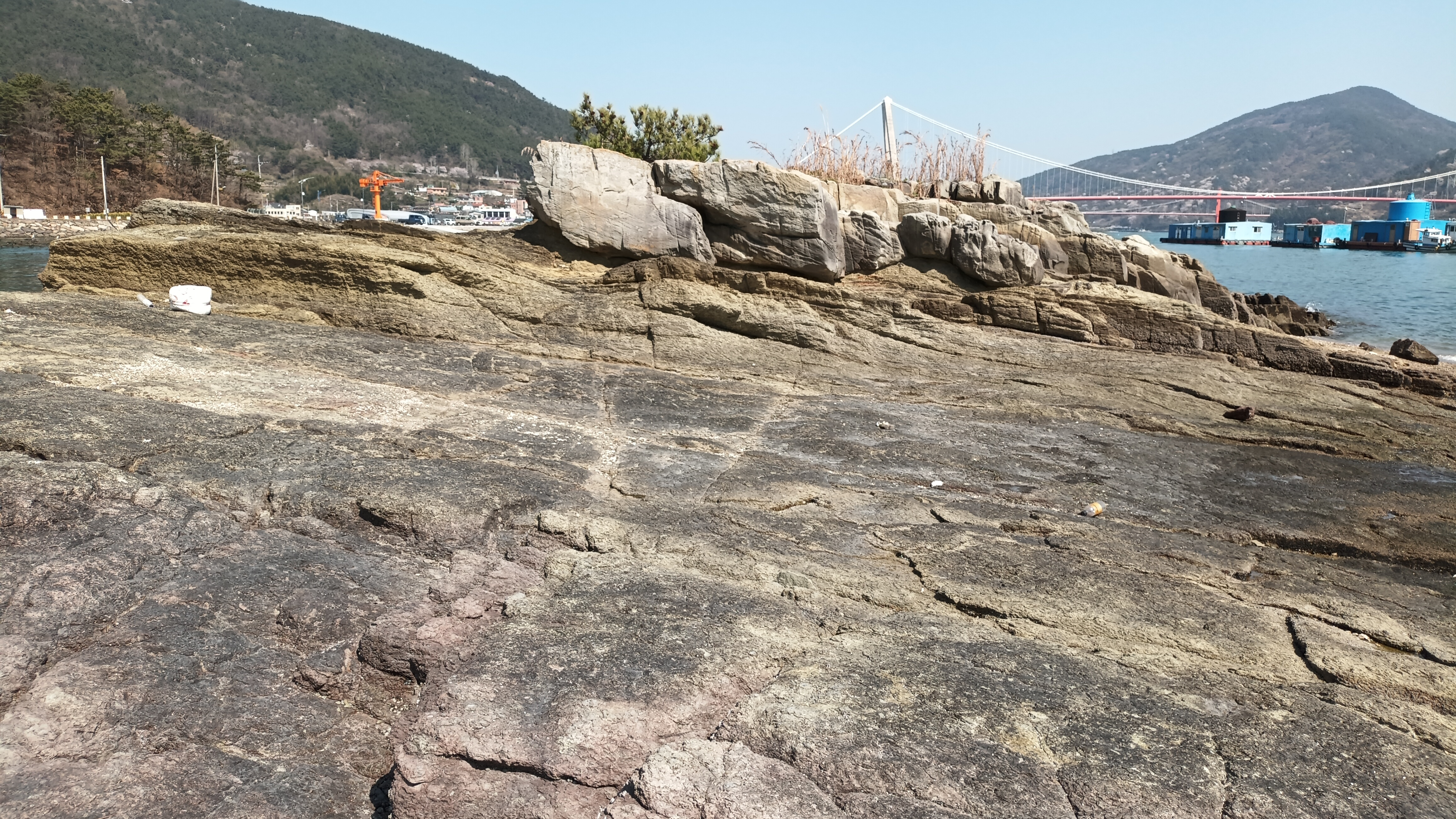
34°56′50.8″N 127°51′08.1″E

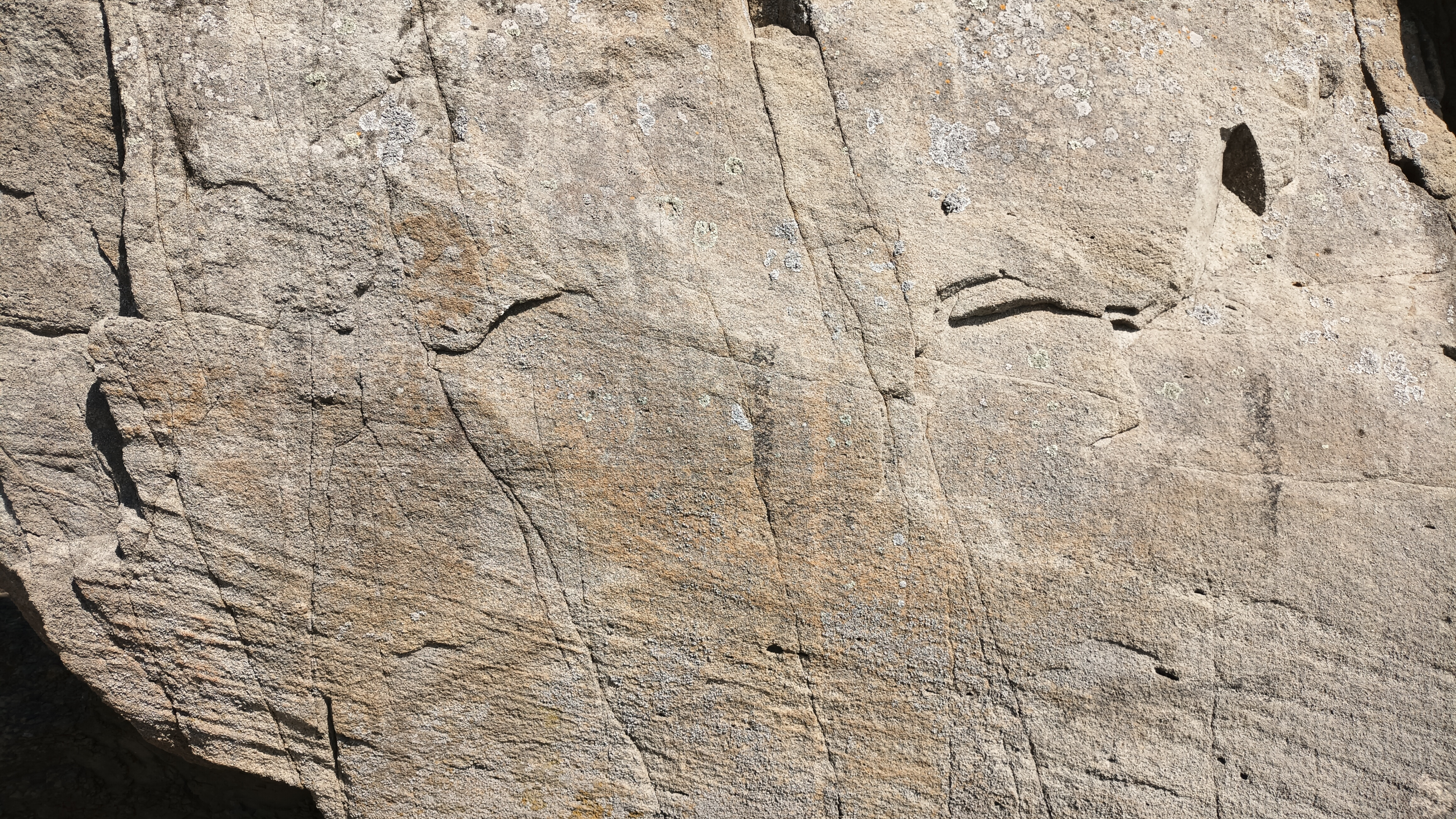
Cross-bedding 34°56′50.9″N 127°51′08.5″E

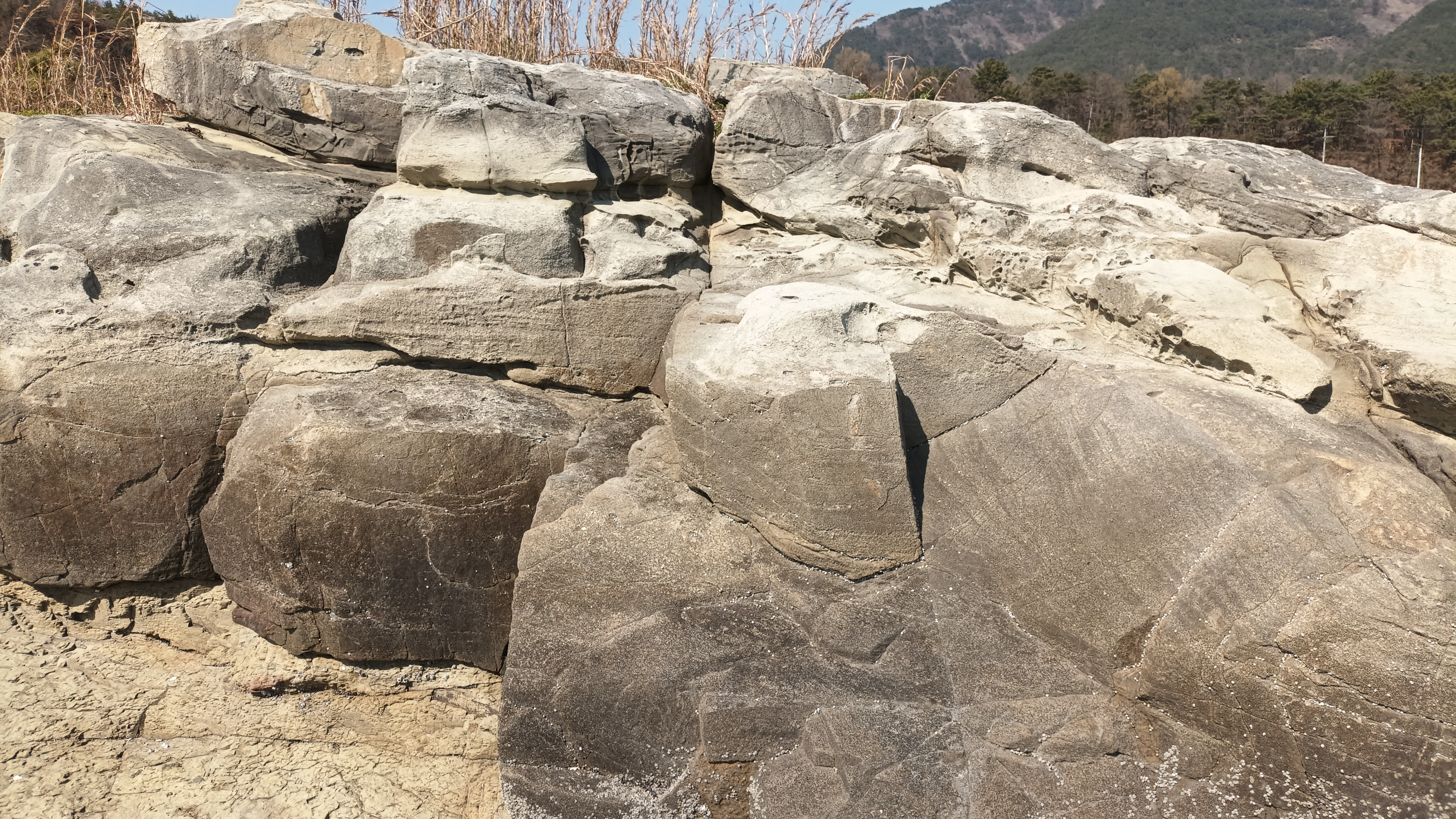
34°56′50.6″N 127°51′08.7″E

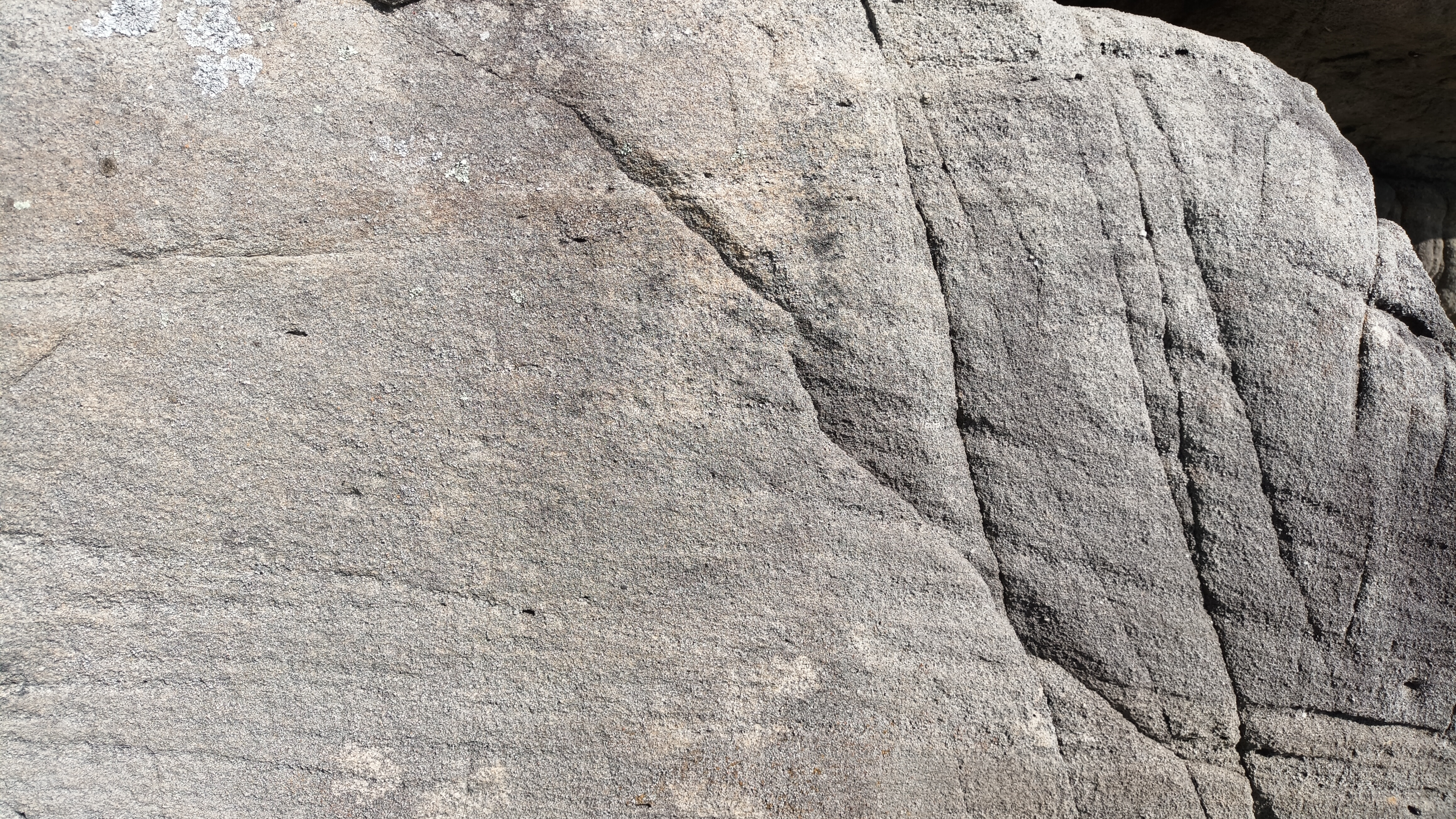
Cross-bedding 34°56′50.9″N 127°51′08.5″E

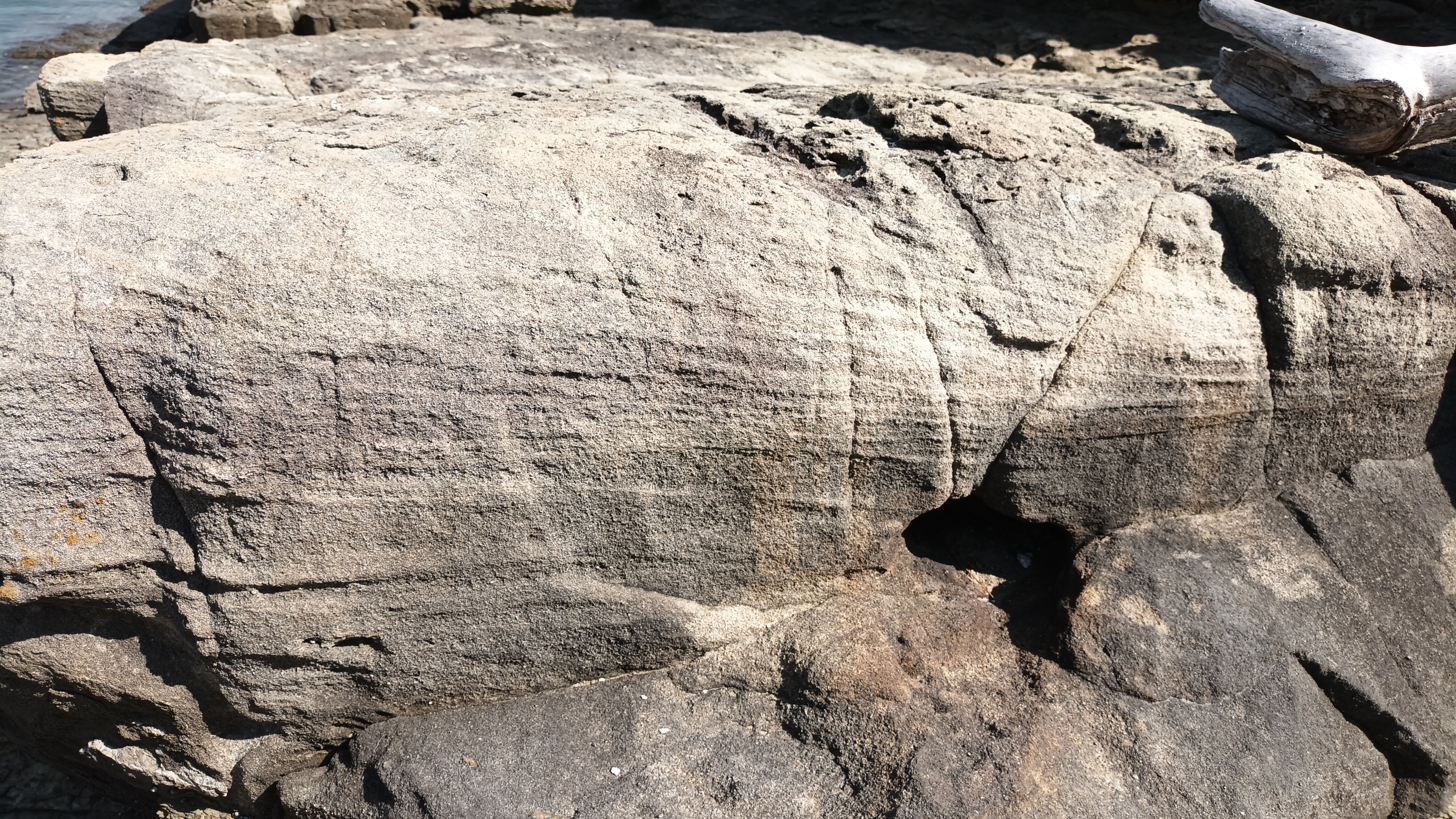
Cross-bedding 34°56′51.0″N 127°51′08.7″E

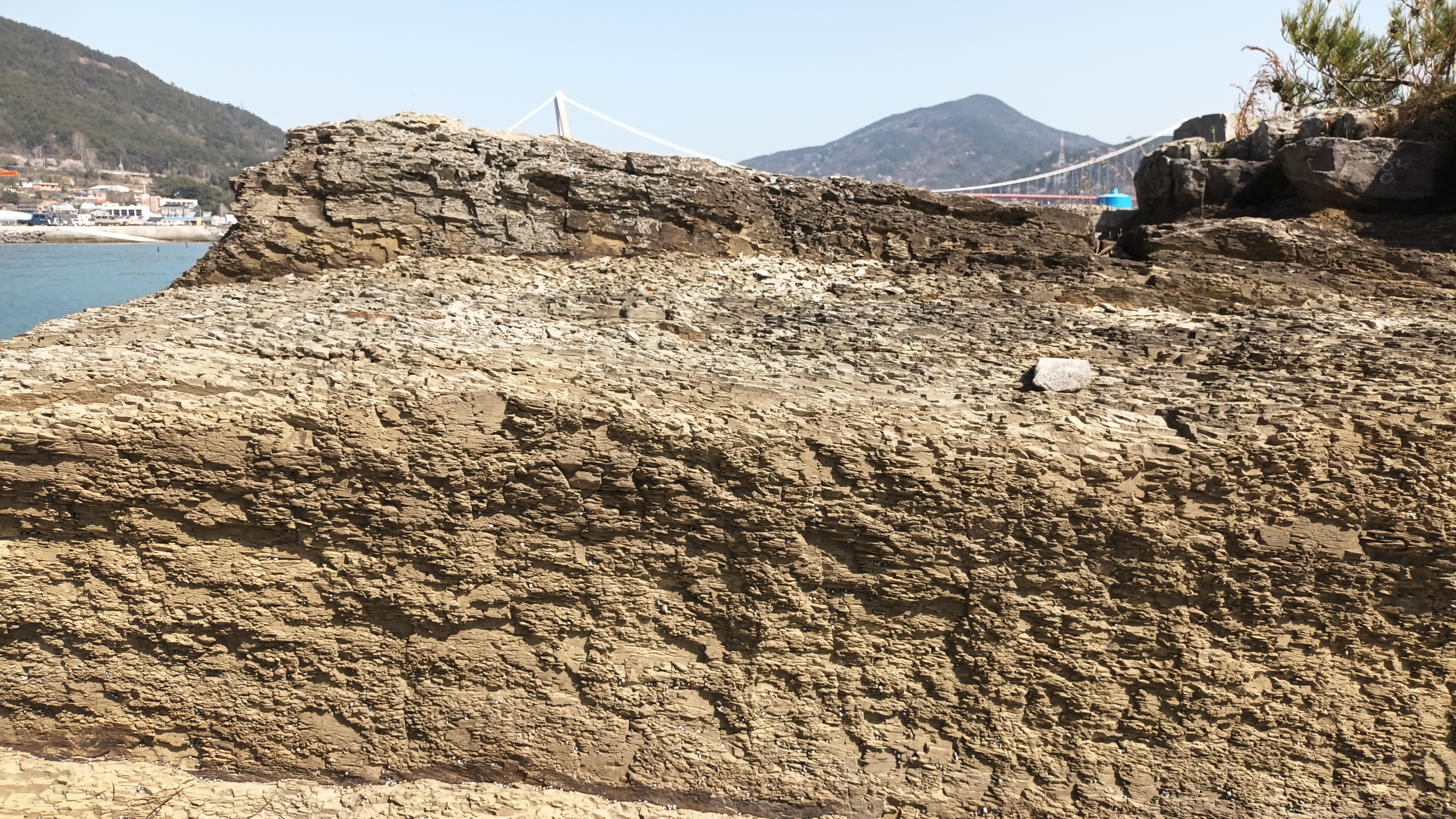
34°56′51.1″N 127°51′08.3″E

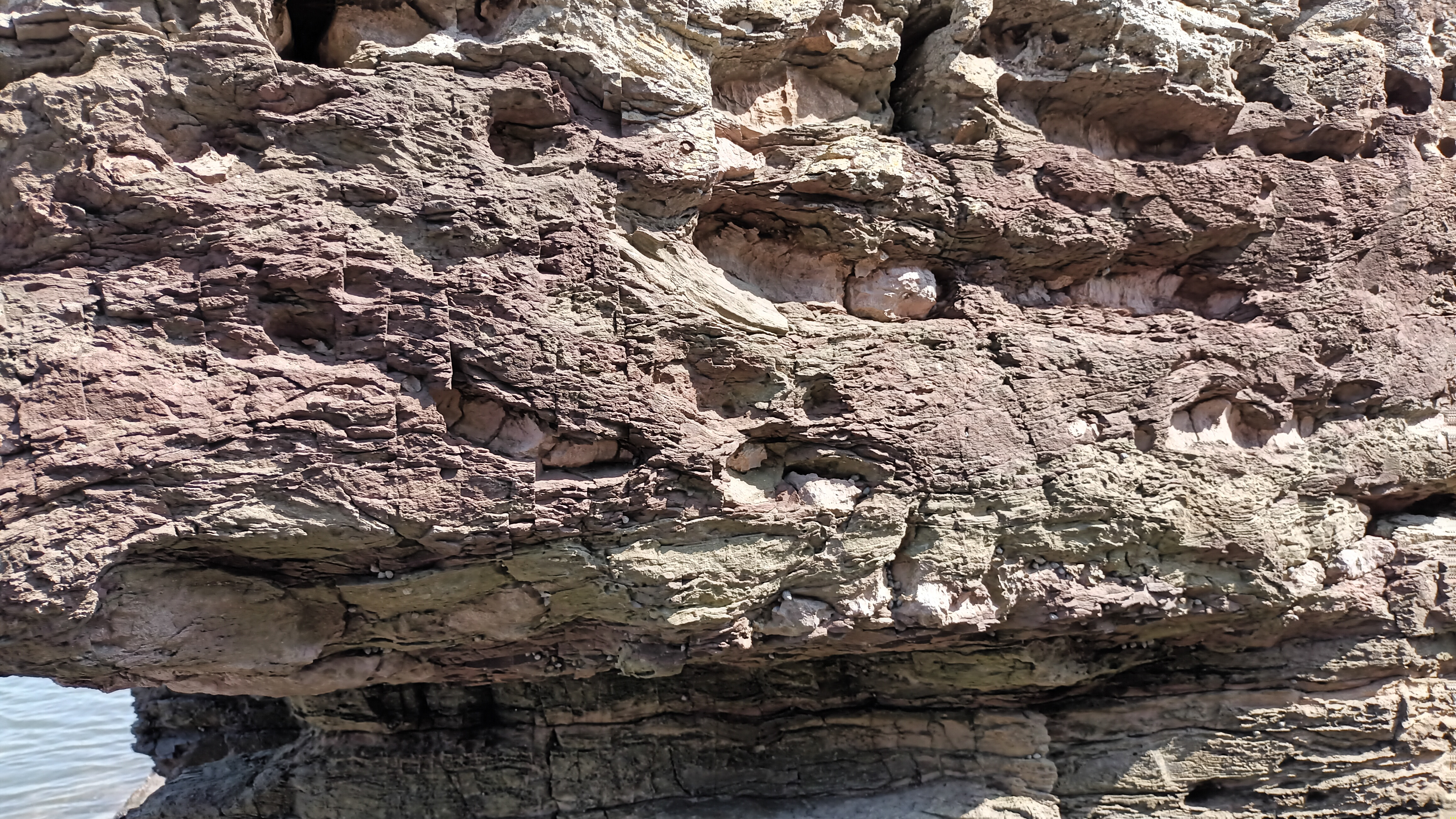
34°56′51.6″N 127°51′08.5″E

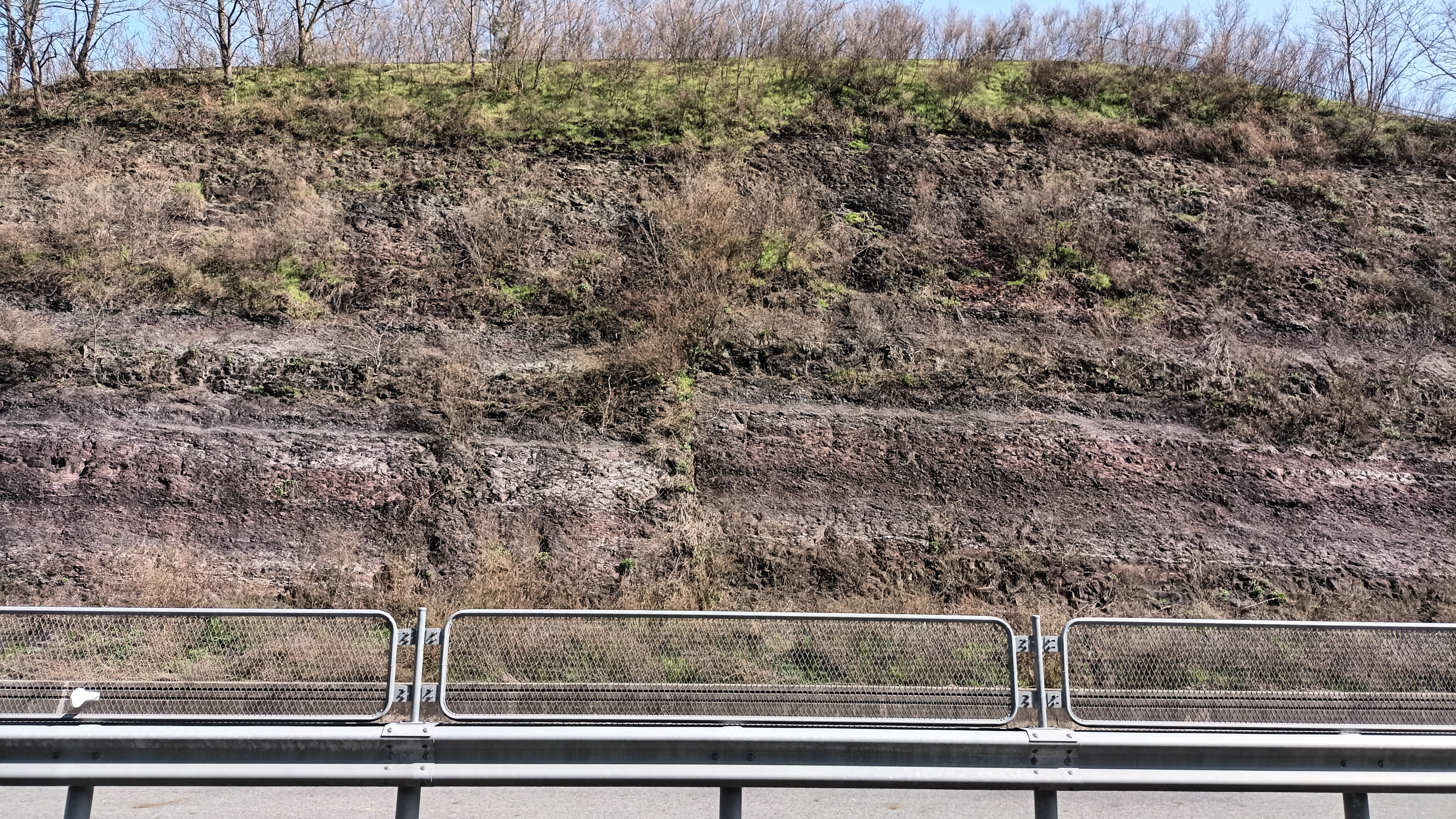
34°57′28.2″N 127°48′37.1″E

== See also ==
- List of dinosaur-bearing rock formations
  - List of stratigraphic units with few dinosaur genera
- Seonso Conglomerate
- Haman Formation
