= Beacon Supergroup =

- Stratigraphic range: Emsian - Induan; ~400–250 Ma
- Type: Geologic Supergroup
- Sub-units: Fremouw Formation; Buckley Formation; Takrouna Formation

Location
- Country: Ross Dependency

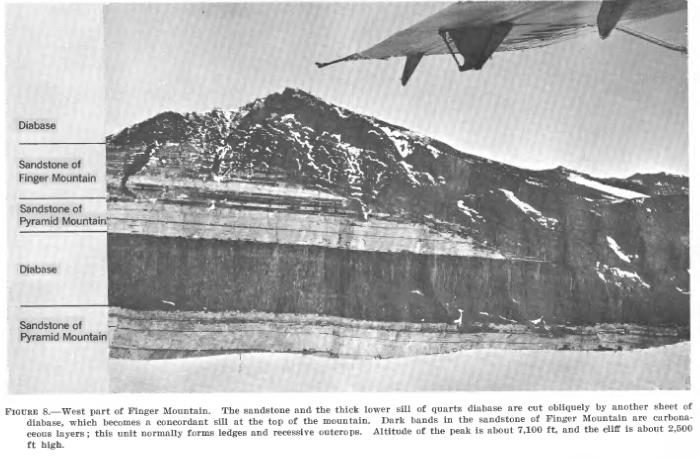
The Beacon Supergroup and diabase intrusions.

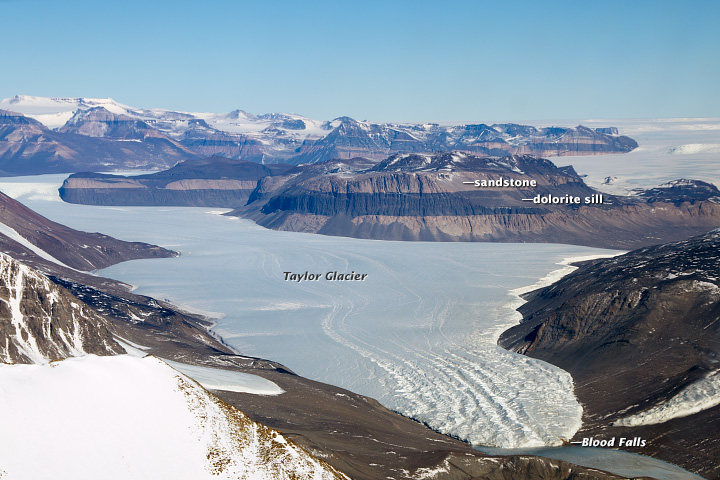
Beacon Supergroup in Taylor Valley. The tan bands are Beacon Sandstone layers and the dark layers are diabase sills, intruded about 180 million years ago.

The Beacon Supergroup is a geological formation exposed in Antarctica and deposited from the Devonian to the Triassic (400 to 250 million years ago). The unit was originally described as either a formation or sandstone, and upgraded to group and supergroup as time passed. It contains a sandy member known as the Beacon Heights Orthoquartzite.

== Overview ==
The base of the Beacon Supergroup is marked by an unconformity and is composed of the Devonian Taylor Group, a quartzose sandstone sequence; and the Late Carboniferous to Early Jurassic Victoria Group, consisting of glacial beds, sandstone, shale, conglomerate, and coal. The Beacon Sandstone was named by Hartley T. Ferrar during Scott's Discovery Expedition (1901–1904), using the Beacon Heights survey points as reference. Glossopteris fossils dated the sandstone to the Permian and linked the lithology to similar sequences on neighboring continents. Generally flat lying, the supergroup is up to 3.2 km thick and is fairly continuous from south Victoria Land to the Beardmore Glacier along the Transantarctic Mountains. The Urfjell Group in Dronning Maud Land and the Neptune Group in the Pensacola Mountains have been correlated with the Taylor Group. Macrofossils and palynomorph assemblages age date Devonian, Late Carboniferous–Early Permian, Late Permian and Triassic strata. The Ferrar Dolerite intrudes at various levels, while the Mawson Formation and Kirkpatrick Basalts within the Ferrar Supergroup cap the Beacon Supergroup.

The location of the formation in a cold, desert environment and the lack of nutrients or soil (due to the purity of the sandstone) has led to the Beacon Sandstone being considered the closest analogue on Earth to Martian conditions; therefore, many studies have been performed on life's survival there, mainly focusing on the lichen communities that form the modern inhabitants.

The supergroup originated in a shallow marine sedimentary depositional environment. The well-sorted nature of the unit suggests that it was probably deposited close to the shoreline, in a high-energy environment. Features such as the presence of coal beds and desiccation cracks suggest that parts of the unit were deposited subaerially, though ripple marks and cross bedding show that shallow water was also commonly present. Heat from burial is modest, though the rock could have been heated to over 160 °C by intrusion of dolerite sills, dykes and lenses during the early Jurassic as a consequence of the breakup of Gondwana 180 million years ago. The rock is low in phosphorus.

== Taylor Group ==
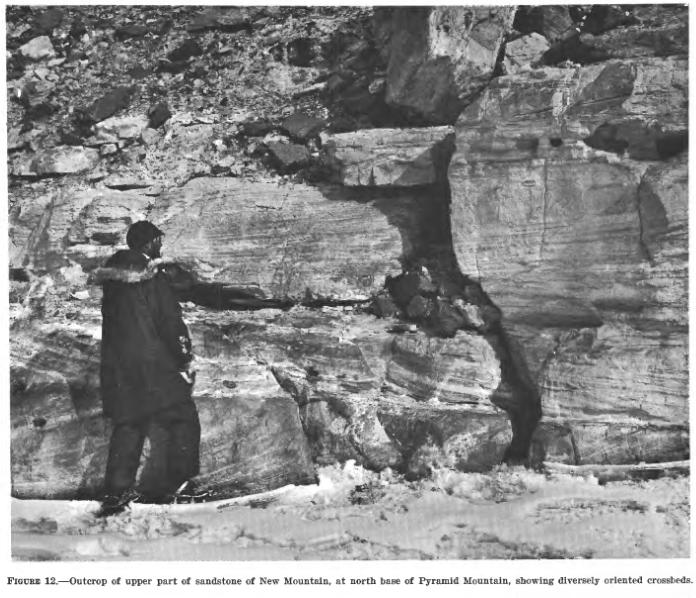
Cross-bedding in sandstone of the Beacon Supergroup suggests a fluvial environment.

The Taylor Group is separated from the overlying Victoria Group by a disconformity called the Maya Erosion Surface. Taylor Group formations in the Darwin Mountains region include the Brown Hills Conglomerate (34 m), which overlies pre-Devonian plutonic rocks of igneous and metamorphic nature, with over 30 m of erosional relief, and igneous and metamorphic clasts. The conglomerate is poorly sorted at the base, with influxes of coarser material. Coarseness is laterally variable, with pebbles in places and sands in others at the same horizon. The conglomerate includes planar beds, trough cross-bedding, flaser bedding, mud-drapes on some ripples, U-shaped burrows and escape structures, with fining-up cycles topped by desiccation cracks in places. The depositional environment is probably that of an alluvial fan, though unidirectional flow and sheet-like deposition point to braided channels. Equivalent strata in South Victoria Land include the Wind Gully Sandstone (80 m), the Terra Cotta Siltstone (82 m), and the New Mountain Sandstone (250 m), which are separated from the overlying Altar Mountain Formation (235 m) and Arena Sandstone (385 m) by a disconformity.

Within the Darwin Mountains region, the Junction Sandstone (290 m) overlies the Brown Hills Conglomerate, with abundant Skolithos. This is followed by the Hatherton Sandstone (330 m), with brachiopod and bivalve shell fragments in places. Trough cross beds and current rippling are present, with abundant ichnofauna. Drainage was to the north east, with the depositional environment presumed to be marine, though also present are subaerial features such as desiccation cracks, rain drop impressions, surface run-off channels, muddy veneers, and redbeds, besides river-like features such as small channels.

The Beacon Heights Orthoquartzite (330 m) is found in the South Victoria Land region between the Arena Sandstone and the overlying Devonian Aztec Siltstone. It is well sorted and cemented, with medium to coarse grain sizes and trough cross-beds, with Haplostigma and Beaconites remnants.

The Aztec Siltstone (125–220 m) is found both in South Victoria Land and the Darwin Mountains. The siltstone includes interbedded sandstones, fish-bearing shales, conchostracans, and paleosols implying subaerial periods within an alluvial plain sequence.

Within the Beardmore Glacier region, the Devonian Alexandra Formation (0–320 m), which constitutes the entire Taylor Group, is a quartz sandstone to siltstone.

== Victoria Group ==
The Victoria Group begins with a diamictite-bearing unit known as the Metschel Tillite (0–70 m) in South Victoria Land and continues with the Darwin Tillite (82 m) in the Darwin Mountains, the Pagoda Tillite (395 m) at the Beardmore Glacier, the Scott Glacier Formation (93 m) on the Nilsen Plateau, and the Buckeye Tillite (140–308 m) in the Wisconsin Range and Ohio Range. The glacial beds are valley fill or occur as sheets. This is followed by the Misthound Coal Measures (150 m) in the Darwin Mountains and the Permian Weller Coal Measures (250 m) in South Victoria Land. A disconformity separates the Misthound Coal Measures from the overlying Ellis Formation (177 m), consisting of conglomerate, sandstone and siltstone. The Pyramid Erosion Surface separates the Mitschell Tillite and the Weller Coal Measures, which are overlain by the Feather Conglomerate (215 m) and the Triassic Lashly Formation (520 m). The Pagoda Tillite is overlain by the MacKellar Formation (140 m) of interbedded black shales and fine sandstones, the Lower Permian Fairchild Formation (220 m) arkosic sandstone, the Upper Permian Buckley Formation (750 m), the Middle-Lower Triassic Fremouw Formation (650 m), the Upper-Middle Triassic Falla Formation (530 m), and the Jurassic Prebble Formation (0–460 m) volcanic conglomerate, tuff and tuffaceous sandstone.

== Paleontology ==
=== Body fossils ===
The Aztec sandstone contains units bearing body fossils of fish: Phyllolepid placoderms, and thelodonts, abundant in fish beds, and conchostracans. The presence of Scoyenia ichnofacies implies freshwater. Also present are charred wood remnants and the plants Glossopteris and Haplostigma. The wood bears clear growth rings, indicating a seasonal environment, and is large enough to represent a temperate climate, though glacial just before Beacon deposition.

=== Trace fossils ===
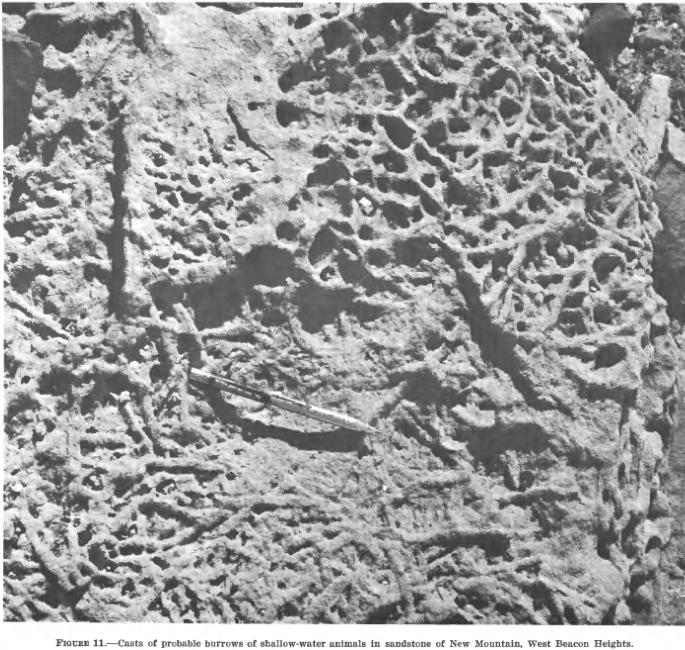
Burrows in the Beacon Supergroup.

Trace fossils are sparse below, but become common in the Hatherton Sandstone. They change from Skolithos-dominated facies to wide diversity and abundance, including vertical and horizontal burrows and huge arthropod trackways. The size of the arthropod tracks (less than 91 cm) is taken to imply that water must have been required for support.

- Fodinichnia: feeding burrows, probably of marine polychaetes, featuring evidence of rhythmic defecation.
  - Narrow, sinuous, near-surface forms on flat bedding surfaces
  - Longer, larger forms, reaching 13 cm across and 1 m in length.
- Walking trackways of arthropods (Repichnia). The presence of crawling traces in such well sorted sands is problematic. The arthropod trackways are thought to have been formed in shallow water, and supersaturated sand has a shallow angle of repose. Thus either a layer of organic matter, perhaps in the form of an algal slime, must have supported the sediment, or the sediment must have been partially dry. In the context of subaerial features such as raindrop marks and desiccation cracks on associated horizons, the best explanation is that the trackways were formed on bedforms produced on a river bed, but while they were exposed by a low-flow period.
  - Beaconites antarcticus: narrow, parallel grooves, about an inch apart, disappearing into elliptical pits; created by shovelling the surface sediment aside before burrowing into the sediment. Occasionally branch.
  - Perhaps B. barretti: more widely spaced grooves (~3 cm); small footprints visible. Implies many walking limbs and an approximately rectangular shape — reminiscent of trilobites. Extend laterally up to 1.7 m; burrow deeply into sediment. Probably produced by a very different arthropod to B. antarcticus.
  - Large (~30 cm wide) trails with a scrape mark from a central tail. Three to four footprint pits diverge from these tracks at a high angle. The feet making the footprints had spines on their rears. These may have been formed by eurypterids but are not a perfect match to known eurypterid trails; they may also have been formed by xiphosurans
- Diplichnites trackways: double rows of fossils previously attributed to marine trilobites but now thought to perhaps be formed by annelids or myriapods. Here they appear on metre-scale crossbeds that may represent sub-fluvial dunes.
- Cruziana and Rusophycus: thought to be formed by trilobites, whose body fossils are found only in marine assemblages. Could also have been made by other arthropods, or the lower parts of the Beacon Sandstone may have been marine. They have been found in many other non-marine instances.
- Skolithos: traditionally thought to be marine; however, there are many counterexamples.
