= Beaconites =

Trace fossil

Beaconites is an ichnogenus known from the Beacon Supergroup, Antarctica, comprising a large, segmented burrow, bearing superficial resemblance to the skeleton of a snake, and probably created by a worm-like organism "shovelling" the substrate out of its way. Some terminate in elliptical pits, around 1.5 cm in diameter, presumed to represent burrowing activity. The producer of the trace is thought to have burrowed to a depth of no more than a few tens of centimeters.

== Ichnospecies ==
- B. antarcticus (Vialov, 1962) type fossil
- B. capronus (Howard and Frey, 1984)
- B. coronus (Frey et al., 1984)
- B. fliformis (Uchman and Alvaro, 2000)

== See also ==
- Trace fossil – Geological record of biological activity
