= Haplostigma =

Haplostigma Temporal range: Middle Devonian

Scientific classification
- Kingdom: Plantae
- Clade: Tracheophytes
- Clade: Lycophytes
- Class: Lycopodiopsida
- Genus: †Haplostigma

Genus of spore-bearing plants

Haplostigma is a genus of arborescent lycopodiopsid, found only in the early part of the Middle Devonian.
