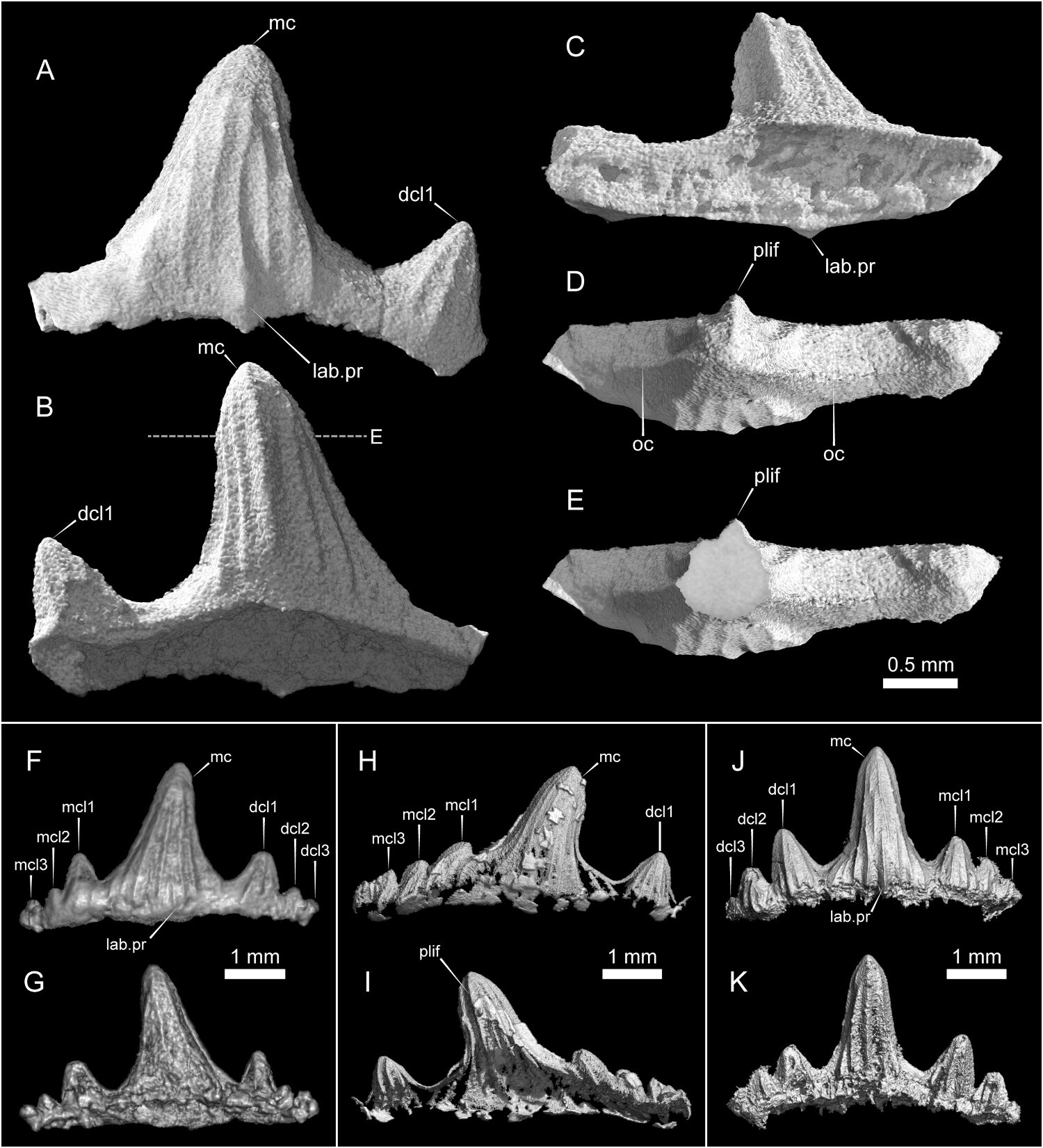
- Teeth of Parvodus ominechonensis

Scientific classification
- Kingdom: Animalia
- Phylum: Chordata
- Class: Chondrichthyes
- Order: †Hybodontiformes
- Family: †Lonchidiidae
- Genus: †Parvodus; Rees & Underwood, 2001

Type species
- Lissodus rugianus Ansorge, 1990

= Parvodus =

Parvodus Temporal range: Olenekian–Valanginian

Extinct genus of cartilaginous fishes

Parvodus is an extinct genus of hybodont, known from the Mesozoic era.

== Species ==
The initial study naming the genus considered 3 species valid, which were originally placed in Lissodus.

- P. curvidens (Duffin and Thies, 1997), Kimmeridgian, Germany
- P. ominechonensis Breeden et al., 2024, Carnian, Japan
- P. pattersoni (Duffin, 1985), Bathonian, England and Scotland
- P. rugianus (Ansorge, 1990) Berriasian-Valanginian, England, Germany, Denmark and Sweden
- P. graciliani Ribeiro & França, 2026, Tithonian, Brazil.

The paper also noted a possible record is known from the Sinemurian of England.

Some later studies also included the species Parvodus heterodon (Patterson, 1966) from the Early Cretaceous of England in the genus, though other studies have included this species in the genus Polyacrodus. Some studies have also included the species "Hybodus" parvidens Woodward, 1916, from the Early Cretaceous of Europe and North America within Parvodus, though again this species has also been assigned to Polyacrodus. A 2023 paper assigned the newly described species P. huizodus from the Early Triassic of China to the genus. The species Parvodus celsucuspus Rees et al., 2013 has been reported from the Early Cretaceous of England and France. A single tooth of Parvodus sp. has also been reported from the Upper Cretaceous (Campanian) of France.

In 2026, a new species of Parvodus was published: P. graciliani, honoring the Brazilian writer Graciliano Ramos (1892–1953), author of the novel Vidas Secas. This new species was described based on isolated teeth recovered from lacustrine deposits of the Aliança Formation in the Jatobá Basin and represents the first formally named species of the genus from this unit.
