= Isanodus =

Isanodus Temporal range: Lower Cretaceous

Scientific classification
- Kingdom: Animalia
- Phylum: Chordata
- Class: Chondrichthyes
- Order: †Hybodontiformes
- Genus: †Isanodus; Cuny et al. 2006

Type species
- Isanodus paladeji Cuny et al. 2006

Species
- I. nongbualamphuensis Khamha, Cuny & Lauprasert, 2016; I. paladeji Cuny et al. 2006

Fossil shark genus

Isanodus ("Isan Tooth") is an extinct freshwater shark from the Lower Cretaceous of Phu Phan Thong Locality in Nong Bua Lam Phu, Thailand. 2 species are recognised in this genus: I. paladeji and I. nongbualamphuensis. They are closely related to Heteroptychodus.
