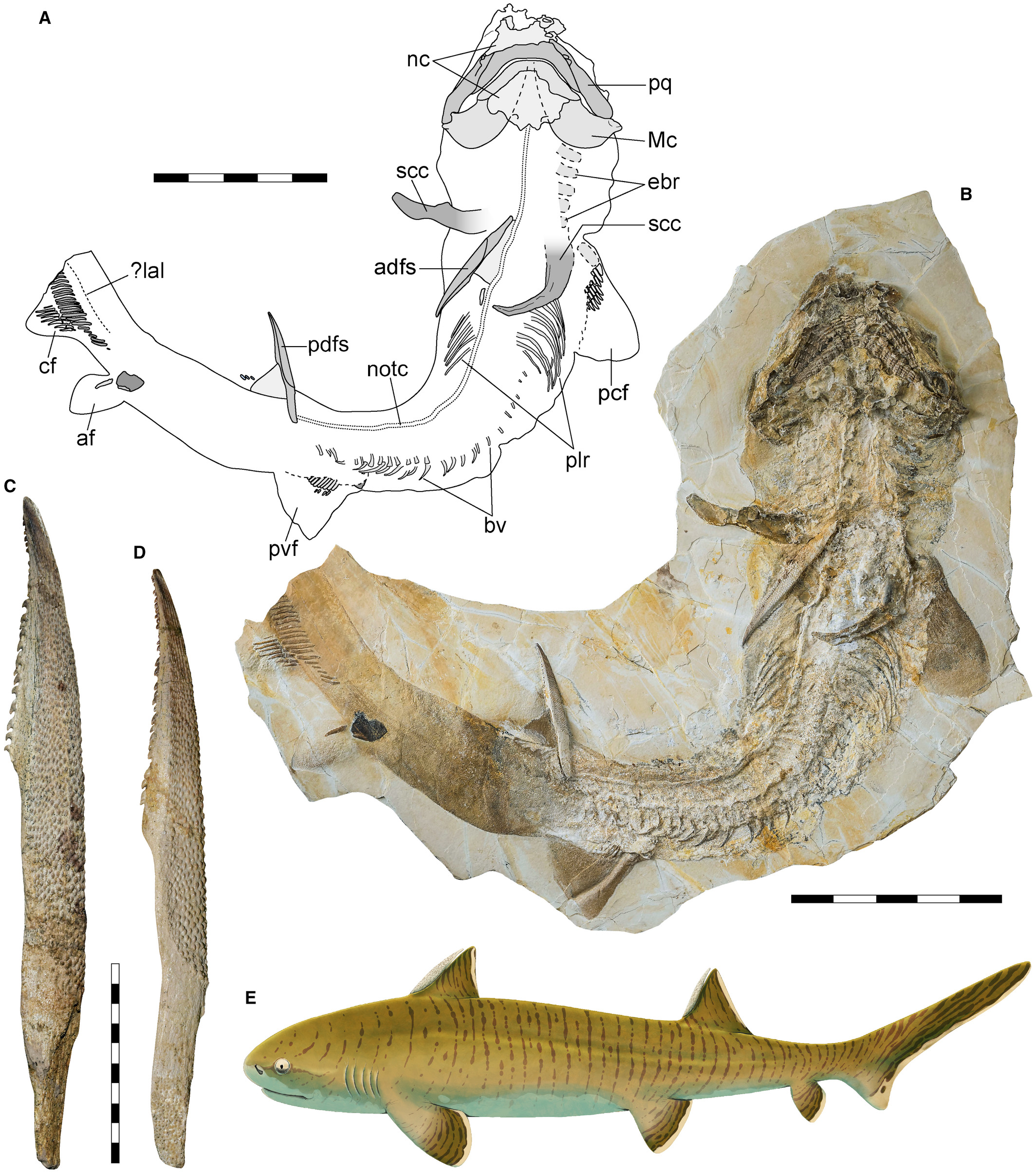
- Complete skeleton and restoration of Asteracanthus ornatissimus from the Solnhofen Limestone

Scientific classification
- Kingdom: Animalia
- Phylum: Chordata
- Class: Chondrichthyes
- Order: †Hybodontiformes
- Family: †Hybodontidae
- Genus: †Asteracanthus; Agassiz, 1837

Type species
- Asteracanthus ornatissimus Agassiz, 1837

= Asteracanthus =

Asteracanthus Temporal range: Bathonian–Valanginian

Extinct genus of cartilaginous fishes

Asteracanthus (from Greek: ἀστήρ aster, 'star' and Greek: ἄκανθα akantha, 'spine') is an extinct genus of hybodont, known from the Middle Jurassic (Bathonian) to the Early Cretaceous (Valanginian).

== Description ==
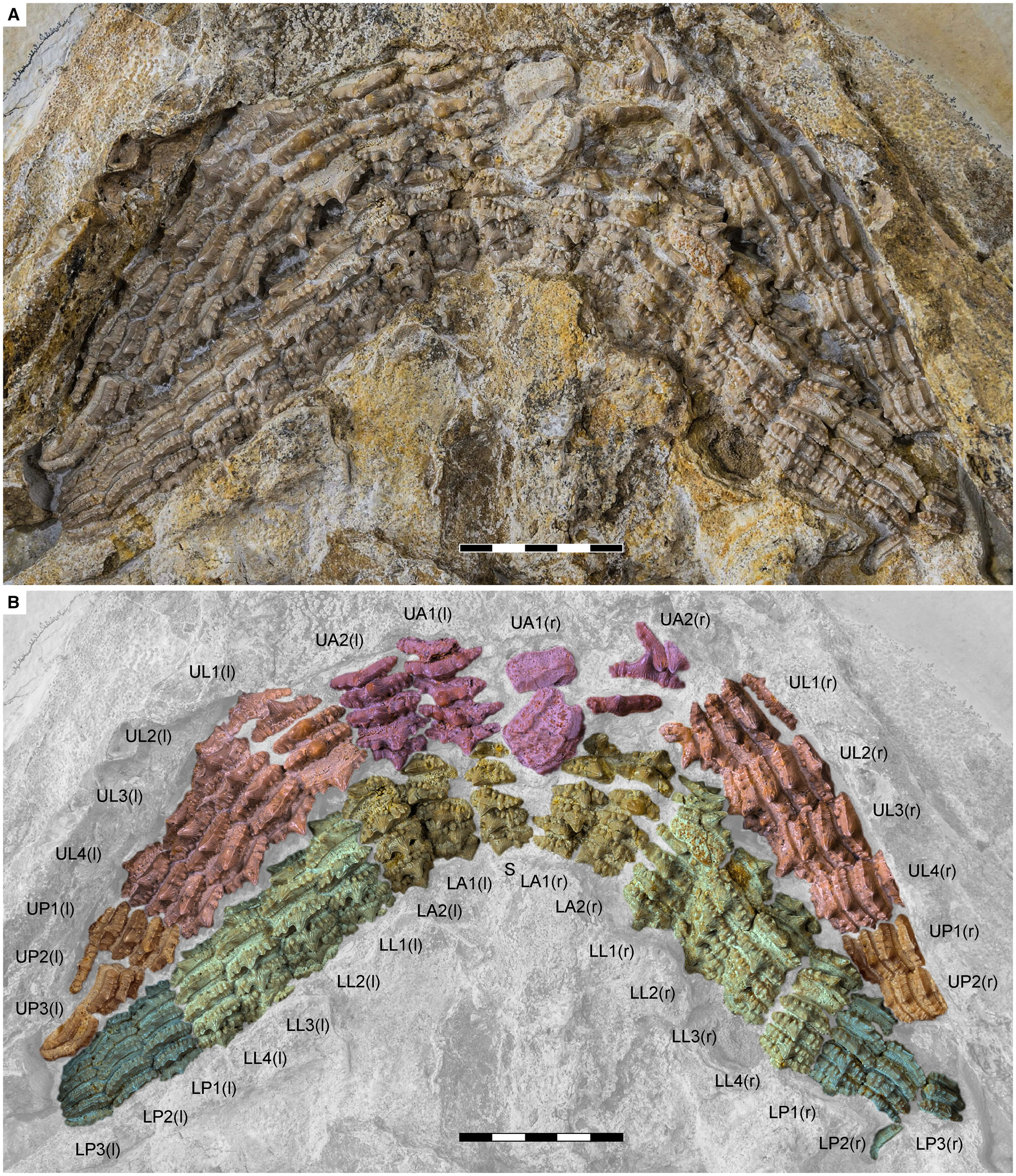
Dentition of Asteracanthus ornatissimus

Asteracanthus was among the largest known hybodontiforms, reaching a length of 2–3 metres (6.6–9.8 ft). The dentition of Astercanthus is high crowned and multicusped. The low-rounded teeth previously attributed to the genus actually belong to Strophodus. Like Strophodus, the fin spines are covered in tubercles, rather than the ribbing typical of other hybodont fin spines.

== Fossil records ==
The genus as currently circumscribed dates from the Middle Jurassic (Bathonian) to Early Cretaceous (Valanginian) of Europe, including Germany, Switzerland, England and France. A complete skeleton was described in 2021 from the Late Jurassic (Tithonian) aged Solnhofen Limestone. Previously considered synonymous, the genus Strophodus (Middle Triassic-Late Cretaceous) is now considered distinct, with the teeth of Asteracanthus having more in common with Hybodus and Egertonodus.

== Ecology ==
The genus seems to have been adapted for open marine conditions and likely had an epibenthic habit (swimming just above the seafloor). It was likely a slow swimmer. The teeth are suggested to have been adapted for grasping, with the teeth at the sides of the mouth serving a crushing function. Asteracanthus was probably adapted for feeding on a wide range of prey, ranging from moderately hard shelled to soft-bodied, likely including fish, crustaceans, echinoderms, hard shelled molluscs and cephalopods like belemnites. Teeth of Asteracanthus found with the remains of marine reptiles suggest that it may have also engaged in scavenging.

== Taxonomy ==
Many of the species previously assigned to this genus are now placed in Strophodus, with a 2021 study considering Asteracanthus ornatissimus the only certain species in the genus. The study considered the genus incertae sedis within Hybodontiformes.
