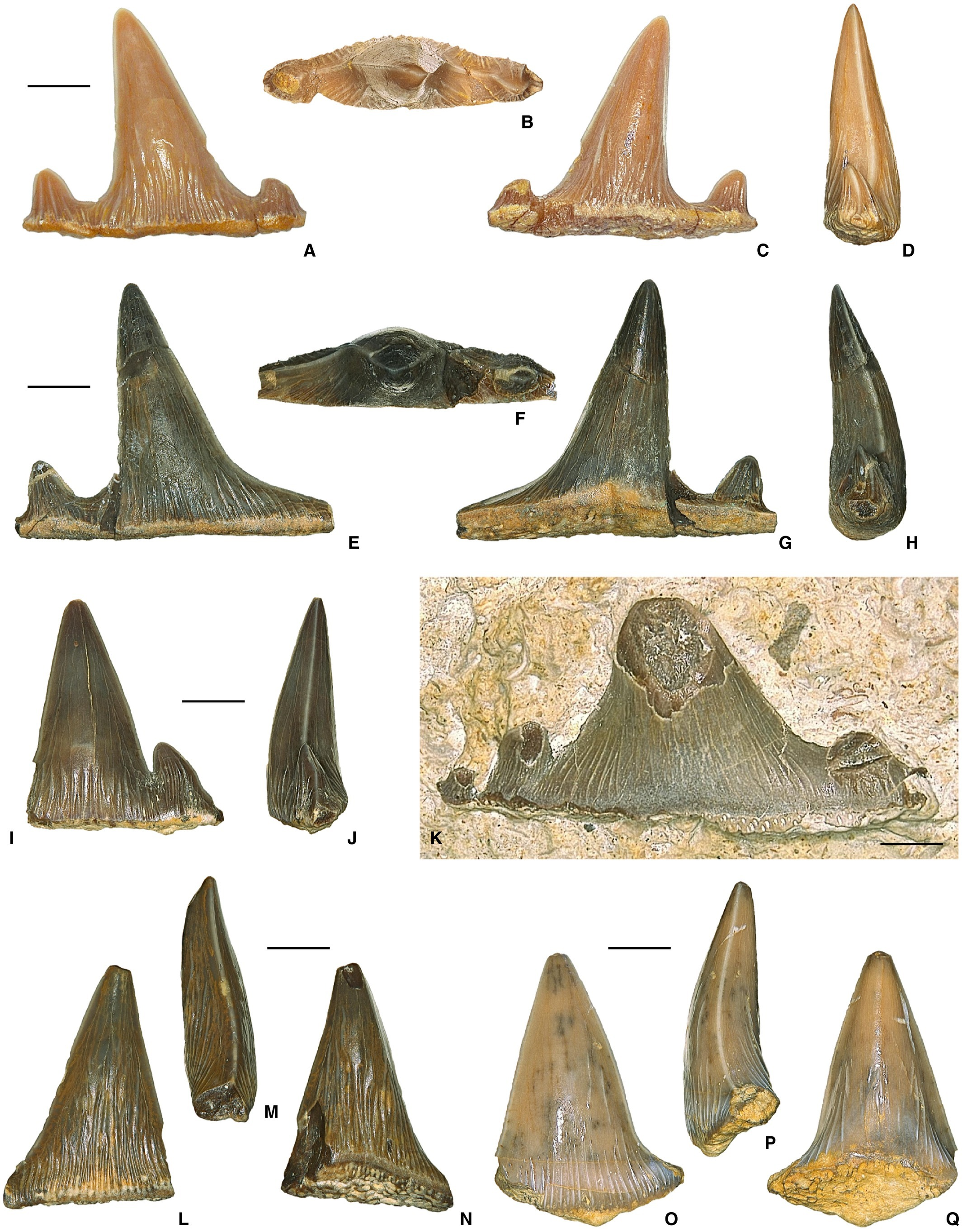
- Teeth of Planohybodus from the Late Jurassic of Switzerland

Scientific classification
- Kingdom: Animalia
- Phylum: Chordata
- Class: Chondrichthyes
- Order: †Hybodontiformes
- Family: †Hybodontidae
- Genus: †Planohybodus; Rees and Underwood, 2008

Type species
- Planohybodus peterboroughensis Rees and Underwood, 2008

Other species
- P. grossiconus (Agassiz, 1843); P. ensis (Woodward, 1916); P. marki? (Pinheiro et al., 2013)

= Planohybodus =

Planohybodus Temporal range: Middle Jurassic - Early Cretaceous Bathonian–Barremian

Extinct genus of cartilaginous fishes

Planohybodus (from Latin planus, "flat", and "Hybodus") is an extinct genus of hybodont, known from the Middle Jurassic-Early Cretaceous (Bathonian-Barremian) of Europe (including Great Britain, France, Spain, Switzerland, Poland, and possibly Denmark) and the Indian subcontinent. Fossils have been found in marine as well as freshwater environments. The genus contains 3 confirmed species, two of which were originally assigned to the genus Hybodus. Possible records have been reported from the Late Jurassic of Mexico, the Early Cretaceous of Brazil (Planohybodus marki) and the Late Cretaceous (Santonian) of North America, but these are unconfirmed. Planohybodus peterboroughensis is suggested to have reached lengths of 2–3 metres (6.6–9.8 ft). A specimen of the ammonite genus Orthaspidoceras from the Late Jurassic of France has been found with an embedded tooth of Planohybodus, suggesting that while the teeth of Planohybodus were adapted to tearing soft bodied prey, it would attack hard-shelled prey at least on occasion.

== Species ==
After Stumpf, Meng, and Kriwet, (2022):

- Planohybodus peterboroughensis (Rees and Underwood, 2008) England, Middle-Late Jurassic (Callovian-Oxfordian)
- Planohybodus grossiconus (Agassiz, 1843) England, Scotland, France, Russia, Middle Jurassic (Bathonian)
- Planohybodus ensis (Woodward, 1916) England, Spain, Early Cretaceous (Berriasian-Barremian)
