= Jiaodontus =

Jiaodontus Temporal range: Late Jurassic, Oxfordian

Scientific classification
- Kingdom: Animalia
- Phylum: Chordata
- Class: Chondrichthyes
- Order: †Hybodontiformes
- Family: †Lonchidiidae
- Genus: †Jiaodontus; Klug et al., 2010

Species
- J. montaltissimus Klug et al., 2010 (type); J. vedenemus Klug et al., 2010

Extinct genus of cartilaginous fishes

Jiaodontus is an extinct genus of lonchidiid cartilaginous fish which existed in Liuhuanggou, Xinjiang Uyghur Autonomous Region, northwestern China, during the late Jurassic (Oxfordian age). Fossils have been found in the Qigu Formation, China. It was first named by Stefanie Klug, Thomas Tütken, Oliver Wings, Hans-Ulrich Pfretzschner and Thomas Martin in 2010 and the type species is Jiaodontus montaltissimus.
