= Columnaodus =

Columnaodus Temporal range: Mississippian

Scientific classification
- Kingdom: Animalia
- Phylum: Chordata
- Class: Chondrichthyes
- Order: †Hybodontiformes
- Genus: †Columnaodus
- Species: †C. witzkei

Binomial name
- †Columnaodus witzkei Cicimurri et al., 2024

Extinct genus of cartilaginous fishes

Columnaodus is an extinct genus of hybodontiform (shark-like cartilaginous fish) that lived during the Mississippian.

== Distribution ==
Columnaodus witzkei fossils are known from the Burlington-Keokuk Bonebed on the border between Illinois and Iowa. It may have eaten crinoids, brachiopods and/or other shelled invertebrates. The Burlington-Keokuk Bonebed sits at the boundary between the Burlington and Keokuk Limestone formations, both of which were deposited into the Illinois Basin.
