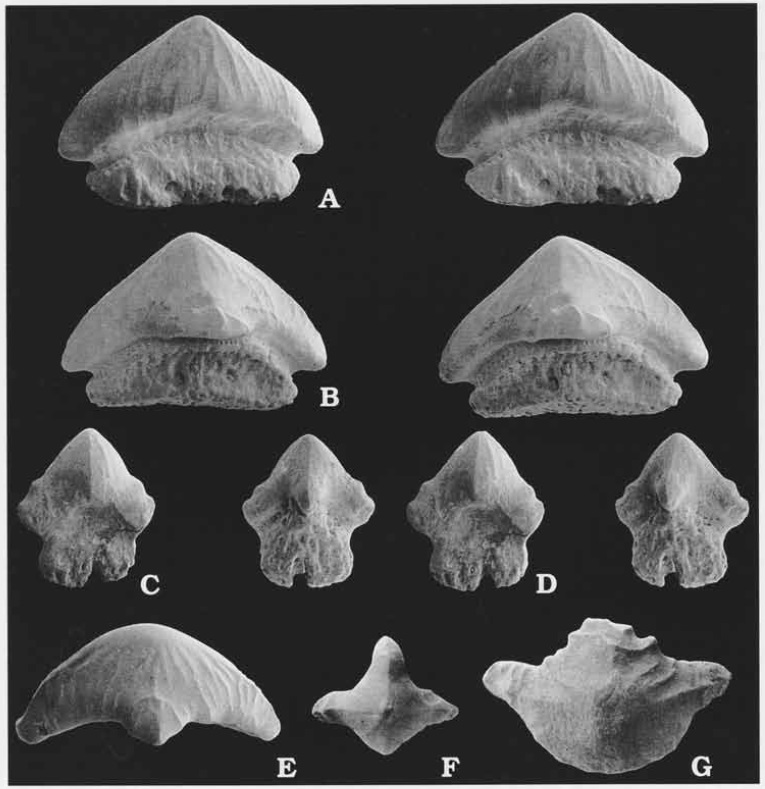
- Teeth of Lissodus hasleensis

Scientific classification
- Kingdom: Animalia
- Phylum: Chordata
- Class: Chondrichthyes
- Order: †Hybodontiformes
- Family: †Lonchidiidae
- Genus: †Lissodus; Brough, 1935

Type species
- Lissodus africanus Broom, 1909

= Lissodus =

Lissodus Temporal range: Early Carboniferous–Albian

Extinct genus of cartilaginous fishes

Lissodus is an extinct genus of hybodont. While fossils attributed to this genus are known spanning from the latest Devonian (Famennian) to the very end of the Cretaceous (Maastrichtian), others consider the genus to have a more narrow range, spanning from the Early Triassic to the end of the Early Cretaceous (Albian). Lissodus is often placed in the family Lonchidiidae, though other authors consider it incertae sedis within Hybodontiformes. Lonchidion has often been regarded as synonymous, but many recent authors consider it to be a distinct but closely related genus. Some authors have proposed that Lissodus is not a valid genus, and that its teeth instead represent a morphological type present among many juvenile hybodonts but that is later lost in adults.

== Description ==
Lissodus sensu lato (including Lonchidion) has been estimated to have had a body size range of 15–50 centimetres (0.49–1.64 ft). Typical dental features of this genus include a single central cusp, base of teeth expanding towards the lingual side and riddled with vascular canals. The shape of the main cusp and large canal openings are similar to those of the Cassisodus margaritae although latter has cusplets on both sides of the crown. The low crowned teeth suggest that Lissodus was a bottom dweller that fed by crushing hard shelled organisms (durophagy).

== Distribution ==
Remains of Lissodus sensu lato have been found worldwide in both marine and freshwater environments.

One tooth of indeterminate Lissodus species is known from the Tournaisian Laurel Formation, Australia.

Preserved skull and postcranial remains are known for the Early Triassic species L. cassangensis and L. africanus from Angola and South Africa respectively.

== Species ==
Known species:

- Lissodus africanus Broom, 1913
- Lissodus angulatus Stensiö, 1921
- Lissodus bartheli Werner, 1989
- Lissodus cassangensis Teixeira, 1956
- Lissodus cristatus Delsate and Duffin, 1999
- Lissodus guenneguesi Delsate, 2003
- Lissodus hasleensis Rees, 1998
- Lissodus johnsonorum Milner and Kirkland, 2006
- Lissodus leiodus Woodward, 1887
- Lissodus leiopleurus Agassiz, 1839
- Lissodus lepagei Duffin, 1993
- Lissodus levis Woodward, 1887
- Lissodus minimus Agassiz, 1839
- Lissodus tumidoclavus Duffin el al., 2023
- Lissodus wardi Duffin, 1985
- Lissodus xiushuiensis Wang et al., 2007
