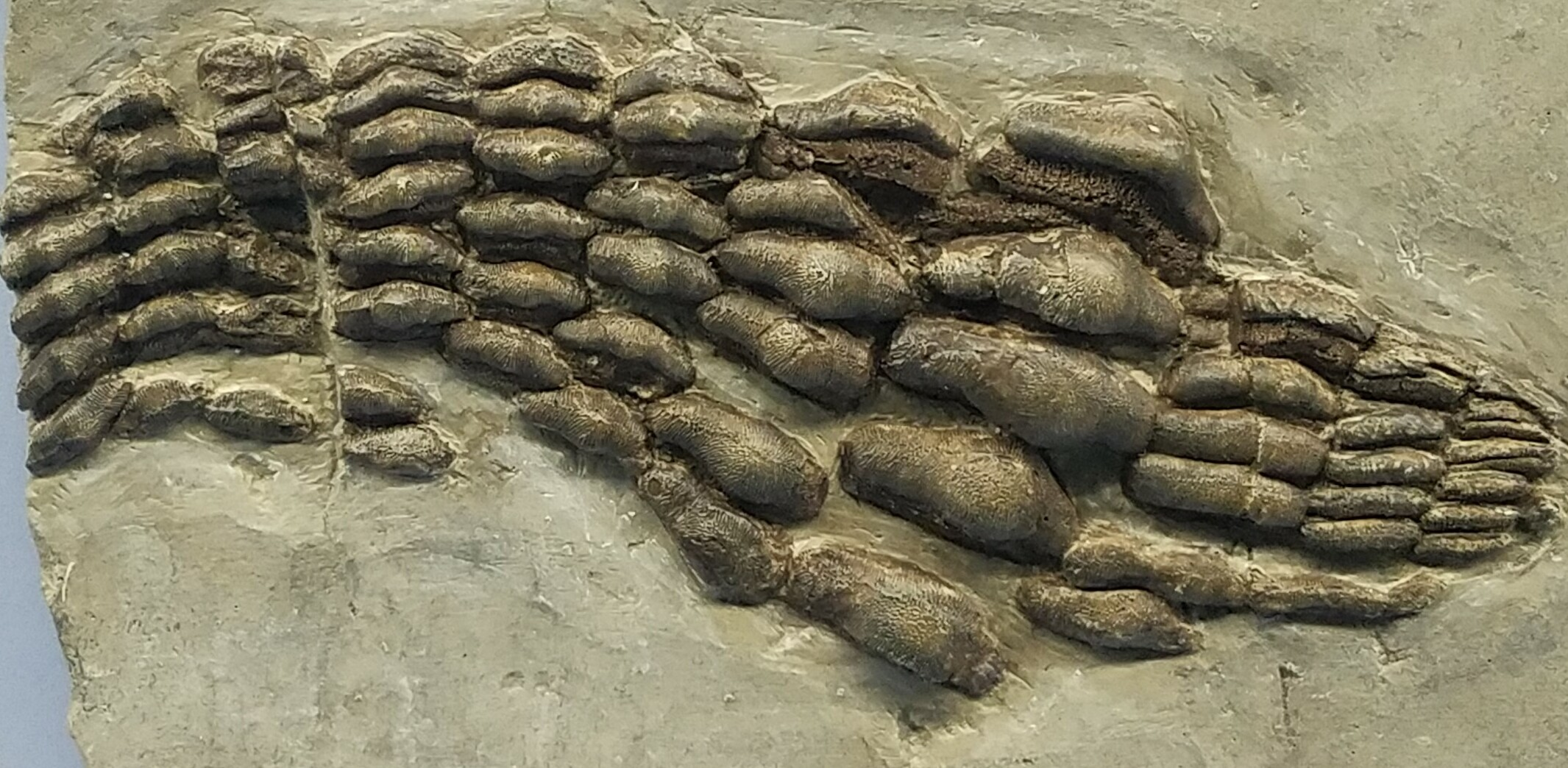
- Partial articulated dentition
- Dentition of Acrodus nobilis

Scientific classification
- Kingdom: Animalia
- Phylum: Chordata
- Class: Chondrichthyes
- Order: †Hybodontiformes
- Family: †Acrodontidae
- Genus: †Acrodus; Agassiz in Alberti, 1834

= Acrodus =

Acrodus Temporal range: Early Triassic–Late Jurassic

Extinct genus of cartilaginous fishes

Acrodus (from Greek: άκρος ákros, 'high' and Greek: ὀδούς odoús 'tooth') is an extinct genus of hybodont spanning from the Early Triassic to the Late Jurassic. (The Early Cretaceous species "Acrodus" nitidus affinity to the genus is questionable.) It was durophagous, with blunt, broad teeth designed for crushing and grinding. Some Middle Triassic species have been suggested to have grown to lengths of 1.8–2.5 metres (5.9–8.2 ft). Species are known from both marine and freshwater environments, with all Middle and Late Jurassic species only known from freshwater.

== Species ==
- Acrodus acuminatus
- Acrodus acutus
- Acrodus alexandrae
- Acrodus alpinus
- Acrodus anningiae
- Acrodus angustus
- Acrodus braunii
- Acrodus (Acronemus) bicarenatus
- Acrodus cuneocostatus
- Acrodus dolloi
- Acrodus falsus
- Acrodus flemingianus
- Acrodus gaillardoti
- Acrodus illingworthi
- Acrodus immarginatus
- Acrodus jaeckeli
- Acrodus kalasinensis
- Acrodus keuperinus
- Acrodus laevigatus
- Acrodus (Acrodonchus) lateralis
- Acrodus levis
- Acrodus microdus
- Acrodus (Acrodonchus) minimus
- Acrodus nitidus
- Acrodus nobilis
- Acrodus olsoni
- Acrodus oppenheimeri
- Acrodus orbicularis
- Acrodus oreodontus
- Acrodus pulvinatus
- Acrodus rugosus
- Acrodus salomoni
- Acrodus scaber
- Acrodus simplex
- Acrodus spitzbergensis
- Acrodus striatus
- Acrodus substriatus
- Acrodus sweetlacruzensis
- Acrodus undulatus
- Acrodus vermicularis
- Acrodus vermiformis
- Acrodus virgatus
- Acrodus wempliae
