= Steinbachodus =

Steinbachodus Temporal range: Late Triassic, 237–228 Ma

Scientific classification (disputed)
- Kingdom: Animalia
- Phylum: Chordata
- Class: Chondrichthyes
- Order: †Hybodontiformes
- Family: †Steinbachodontidae
- Genus: †Steinbachodus; Reif, 1980

Type species
- †Steinbachodus estheriae Reif, 1980

Extinct genus of cartilaginous fishes

Steinbachodus is an extinct genus of shark-like hybodontiform fish that existed during the Late Triassic. It contains a single species, Steinbachodus estheriae, whose fossils have been uncovered in Germany and Austria. Its teeth are up to 3 mm in length, which points to a maximum length of around 60 cm based on its relatives. It had a durophagous diet.
