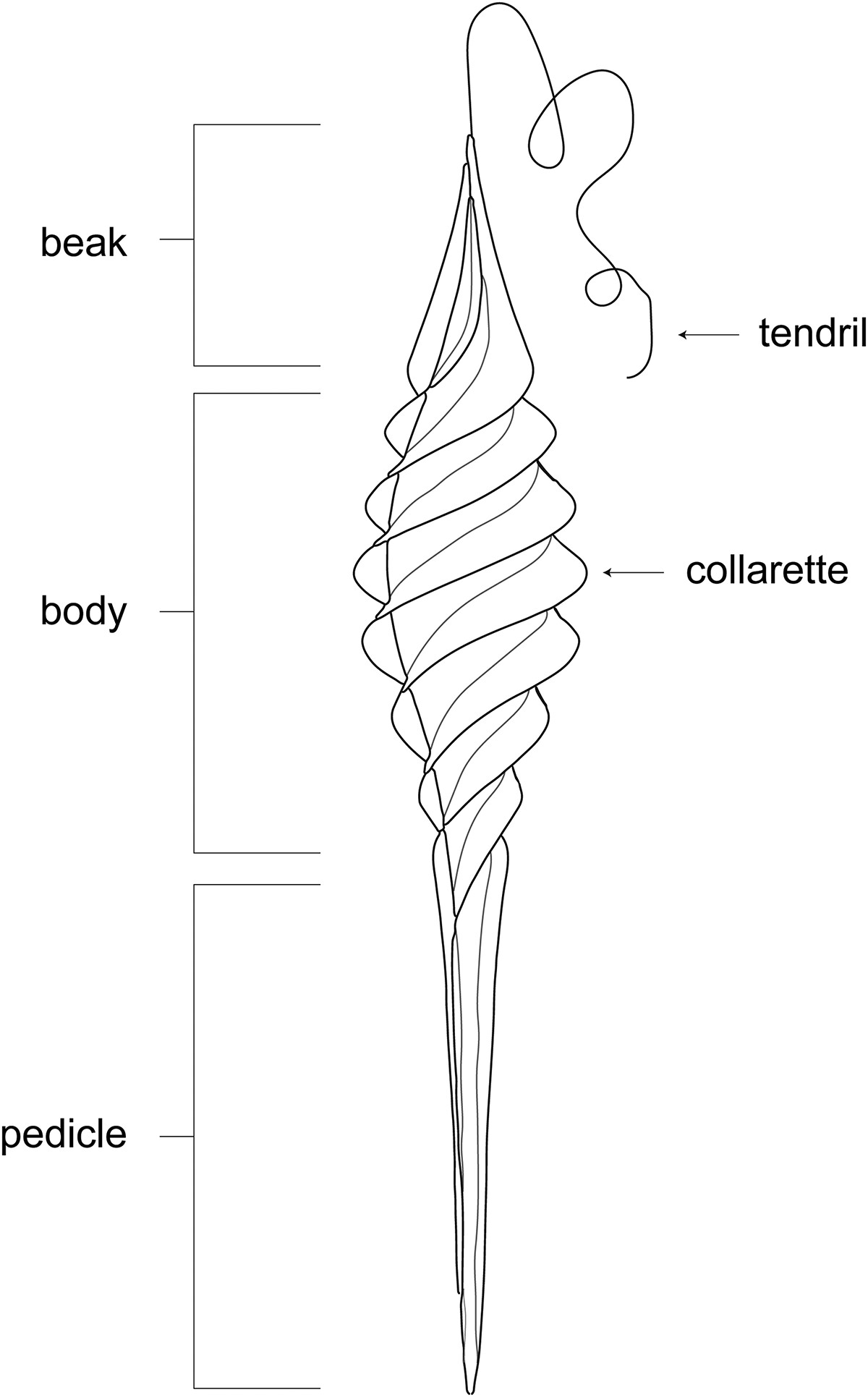
- Diagram of a Mesozoic type Palaeoxyris specimen

Trace fossil classification
- Kingdom: Animalia
- Phylum: Chordata
- Class: Chondrichthyes
- Order: †Hybodontiformes
- Ichnogenus: †Palaeoxyris; Brongniart, 1828

= Palaeoxyris =

Palaeoxyris Temporal range: Carboniferous–Cretaceous

Egg fossil

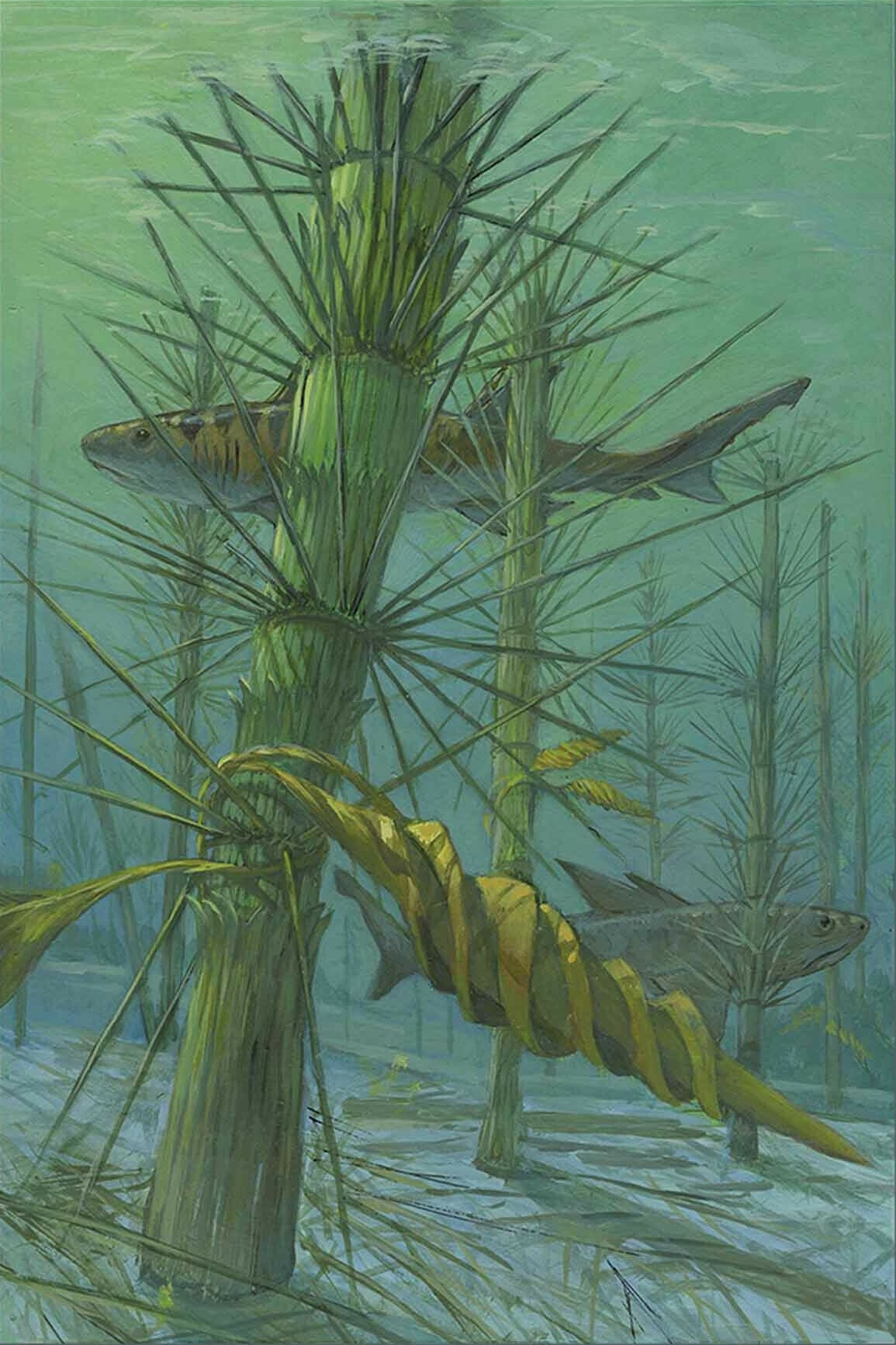
Early Jurassic estuarine ecosystem, with Palaeoxyris egg cases attached via tendril to Neocalamites, with hybodonts in the background

Palaeoxyris is a morphogenus of eggs cases, widely thought to have been produced by hybodonts, with a predominant occurrence in ancient freshwater environments. They comprise a beak, a body and a pedicle. They display a conspicuous right-handed spiral of collarettes around the body, and in some cases, the pedicle, resulting in a rhomboidal pattern when flattened during fossilisation. At the end of the beak was a tendril which attached the egg to vegetation during development. The body of the egg ranges in length from 1.2–8.9 centimetres (0.47–3.50 in), depending on the species.

Originally described as plant remains (being named after the plant genus Xyris), it took decades before their true nature as animal eggs was revealed. Nearly 30 different Palaeoxyris species are currently known with a stratigraphic range from the Carboniferous to the Cretaceous. Mesozoic Palaeoxyris specimens differ from Paleozoic specimens by having the twisting of the collarette end at the beginning of the pedicle, rather than the spiraling continuing down the pedicle as in Paleozoic specimens. Likely hybodont producers of some of the eggs assigned to the genus include the genus Lonchidion.
