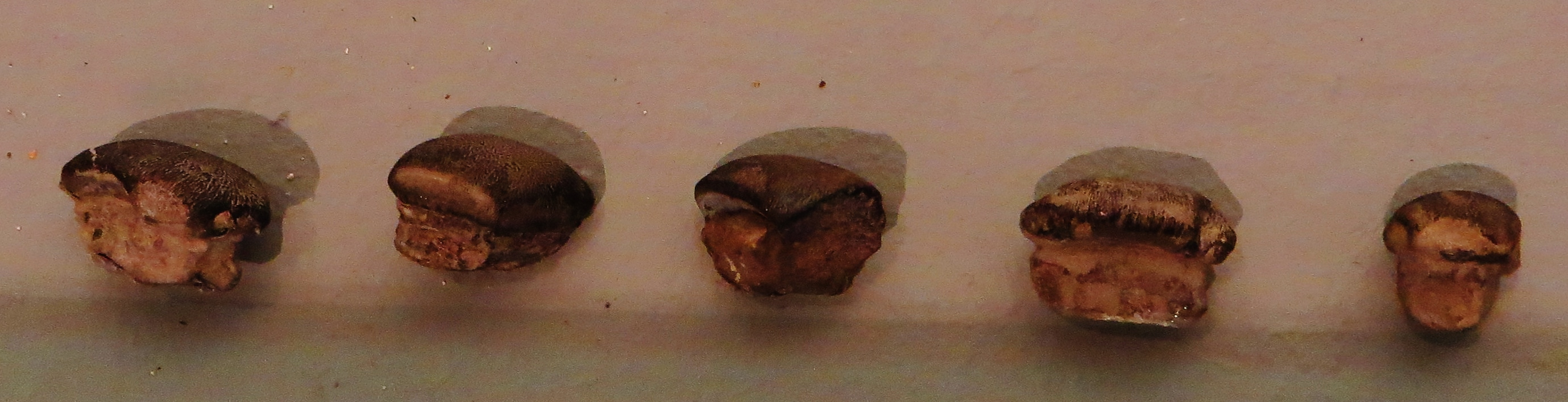
- Teeth from Bdellodus bollensis

Scientific classification
- Kingdom: Animalia
- Phylum: Chordata
- Class: Chondrichthyes
- Order: †Hybodontiformes
- Family: †Hybodontidae
- Genus: †Bdellodus; Quenstedt, 1882
- Species: †B. bollensis

Binomial name
- †Bdellodus bollensis Quenstedt, 1882

= Bdellodus =

Bdellodus Temporal range: Toarcian

Extinct genus of cartilaginous fishes

Bdellodus is an extinct genus of hybodont from the Early Jurassic epoch of the Jurassic Period. The name roughly translates to "leech tooth." Friedrich August von Quenstedt named them this due to their "coal-black" color which he associated with leeches. It is monotypic, containing only the species B. bollensis. It is known from the Toarcian of Germany. It was named on an associated dentition. It is often placed in the subfamily Acrodontinae alongside other durophagous hybodontids.
