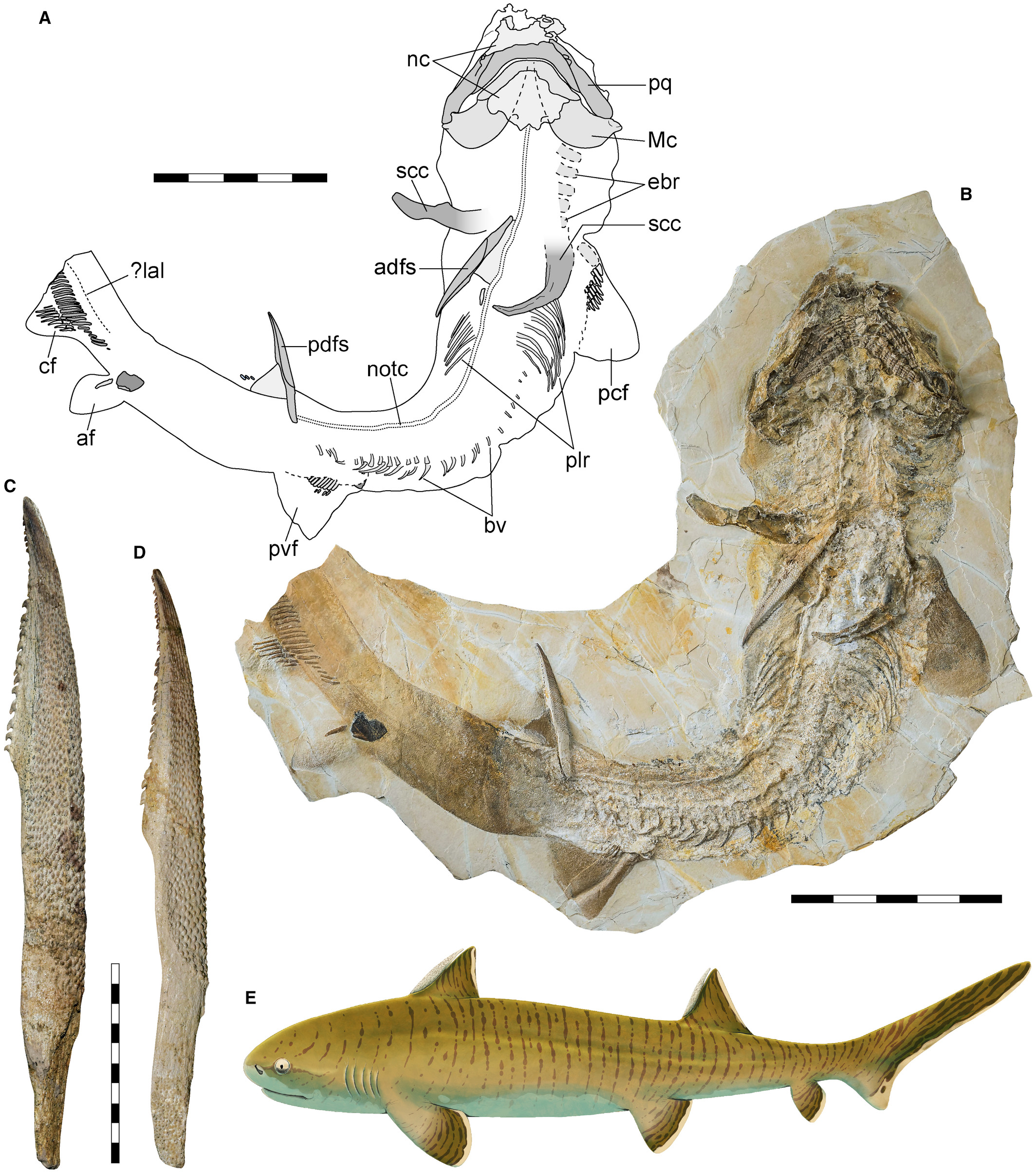
- Fossil and life restoration of Asteracanthus, from the Late Jurassic of Europe

Scientific classification
- Kingdom: Animalia
- Phylum: Chordata
- Clade: Eugnathostomata
- Class: Chondrichthyes
- Clade: Euselachii
- Order: †Hybodontiformes; Patterson, 1966

Families and genera
- See text

= Hybodontiformes =

Hybodontiformes Temporal range: 360.7–66 Ma Late Devonian to Late Cretaceous

Extinct order of chondrichthyans

Hybodontiformes, commonly called hybodonts, are an extinct group of shark-like cartilaginous fish (chondrichthyans) which existed from the late Devonian to the Late Cretaceous. Hybodonts share a close common ancestry with modern sharks and rays (Neoselachii) as part of the clade Euselachii. They are distinguished from other chondrichthyans by their distinctive fin spines and cephalic spines present on the heads of males. An ecologically diverse group, they were abundant in marine and freshwater environments during the late Paleozoic and early Mesozoic, but were rare in open marine environments by the end of the Jurassic, having been largely replaced by modern sharks, though they were still common in freshwater and marginal marine habitats. They survived until the end of the Cretaceous, before going extinct.

== Etymology ==
The term hybodont comes from the Greek word ὕβος or ὑβός meaning hump or hump-backed and ὀδούς, ὀδοντ meaning tooth. This name was given based on their conical compressed teeth.

== Taxonomic history ==
Hybodonts were first described in the nineteenth century based on isolated fossil teeth (Agassiz, 1837). Hybodonts were first separated from living sharks by Zittel (1911). Although historically argued to have a close relationship with the modern shark order Heterodontiformes, this has been refuted. Hybodontiformes are total group-elasmobranchs and the sister group to Neoselachii, which includes modern sharks and rays. Hybodontiformes and Neoselachii are grouped together in the clade Euselachii, to the exclusion of other total-group elasmobranchs like Xenacanthiformes. Hybodonts are divided into a number of families, but the higher level taxonomy of hybodonts, especially Mesozoic taxa, is poorly resolved.

Simplified cladogram of chondrichthyan relationships following several studies.

- Chondrichthyes
  - Holocephali (chimaeras and relatives)
  - Total group Elasmobranchii
    - †Xenacanthiformes
    - †Ctenacanthiformes (possibly paraphyletic)
    - †Phoebodontiformes
    - Euselachii
      - †Hybodontiformes
      - Neoselachii
        - Selachii (modern sharks)
        - Batomorphi (rays, etc)

== Description ==
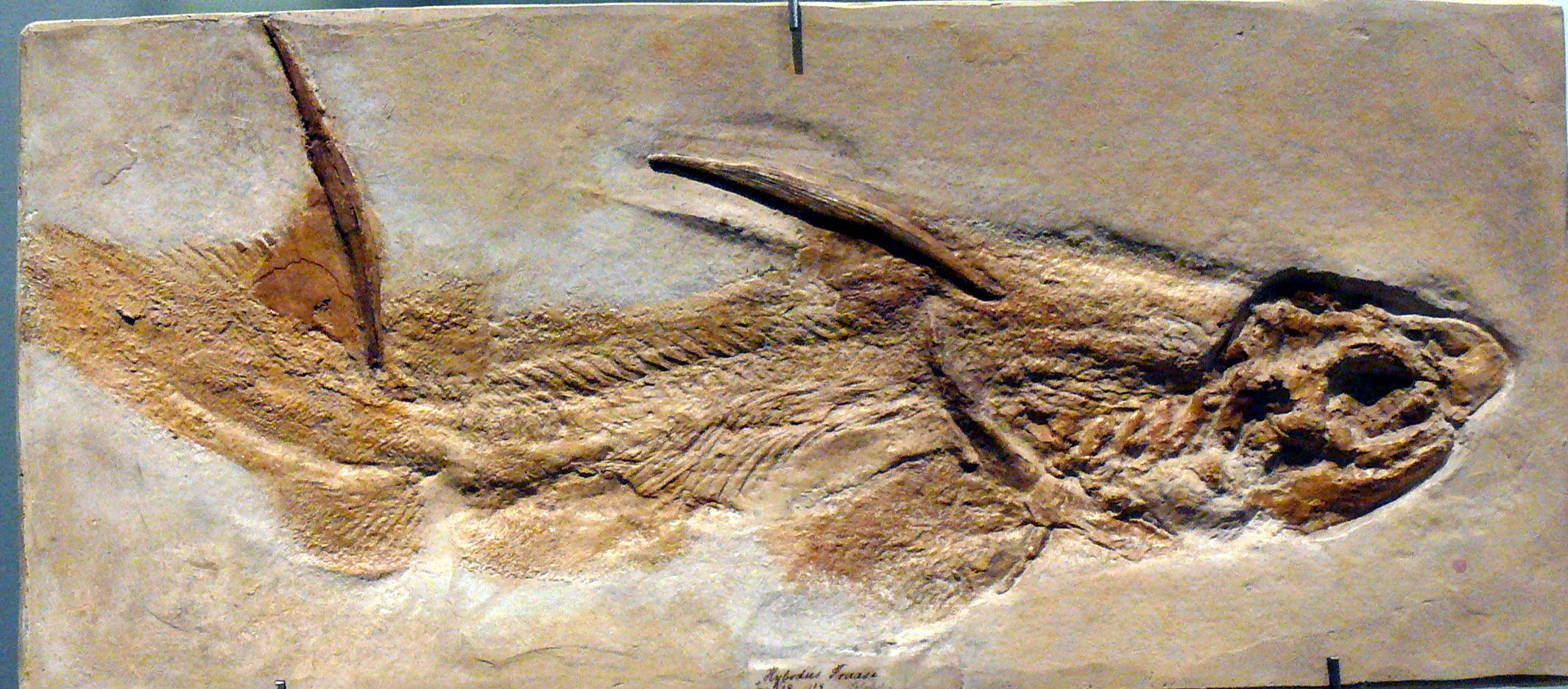
Specimen of "Hybodus" fraasi from the Late Jurassic of Germany, which some studies have included in Egertonodus

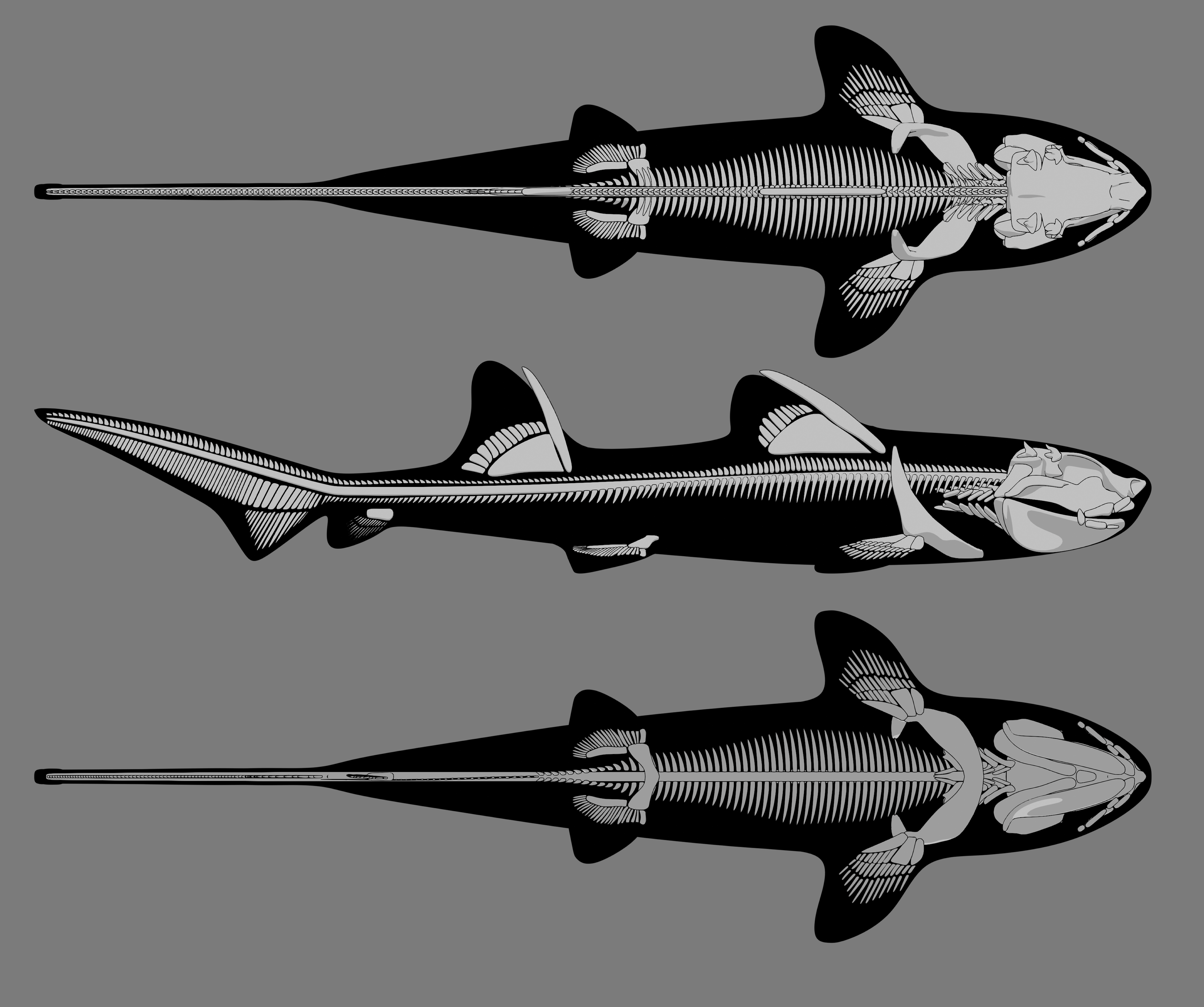
Skeletal diagram of Hybodus sp.

The largest hybodonts reached lengths of 2–3 metres (6.6–9.8 ft), while some other hybodonts were much smaller, with adult body lengths of around 25 centimetres (0.82 ft). Hybodonts had a generally robust bodyform. Due to their cartilaginous skeletons usually disintegrating upon death like other chondrichthyans, hybodonts are generally described and identified based on teeth and fin spine fossils, which are more likely to be preserved. Rare partial or complete skeletons are known from areas of exceptional preservation.

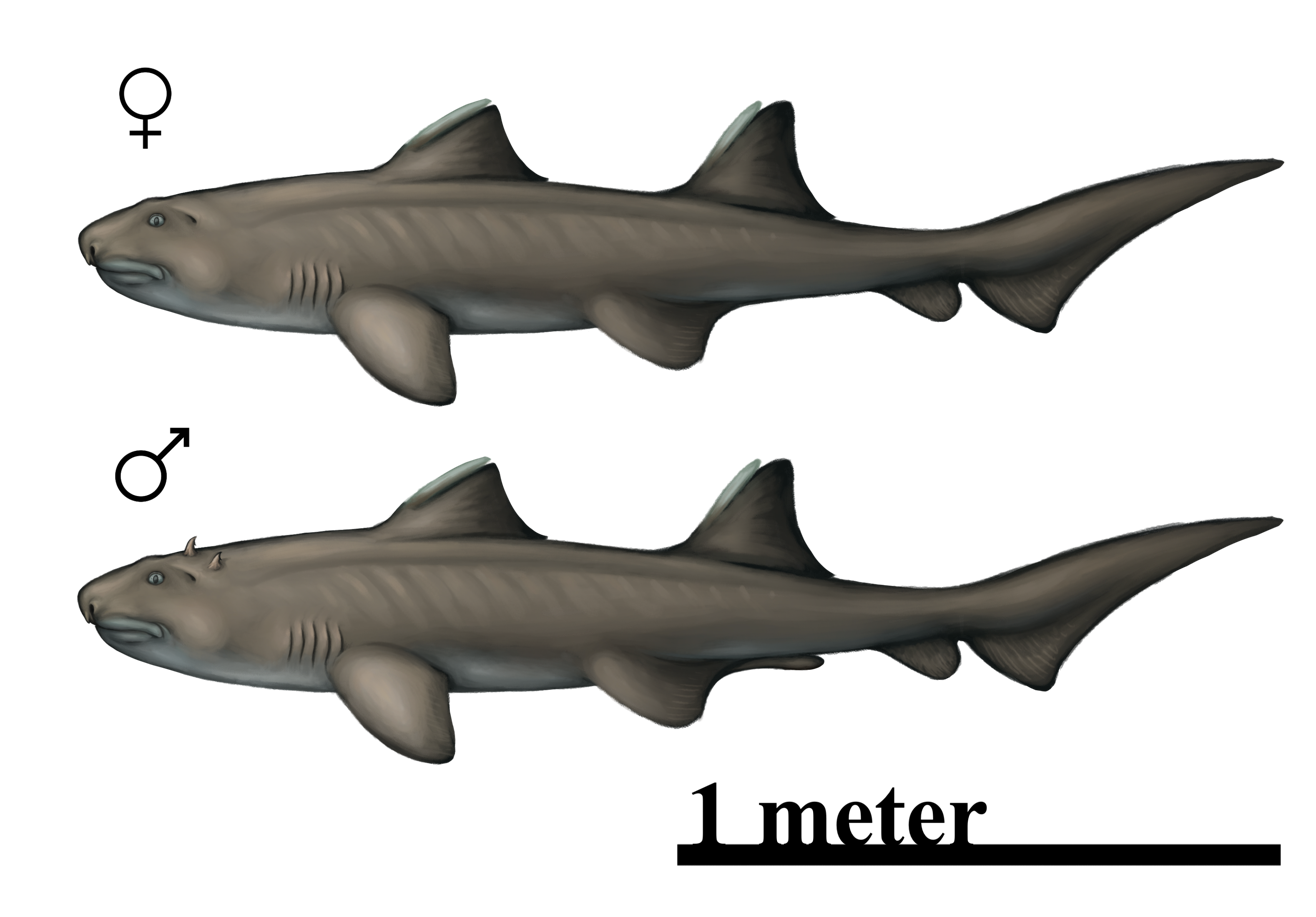
Restoration of Hybodus hauffianus showing sexual dimorphism with fin claspers and cephalic spines present in males (below) but absent in females (above)

Hybodonts are recognized as having teeth with a prominent cusp which is higher than lateral cusplets. Hybodont teeth are often preserved as incomplete fossils because the base of the tooth is not well attached to the crown. Hybodonts were initially divided into two groups based on their tooth shape. One group had teeth with acuminate cusps that lacked a pulp cavity; these are called osteodont teeth. The other group had a different cusp arrangement and had a pulp cavity, these are called orthodont teeth. For example, the hybodont species Heterophychodus steinmanni have osteodont teeth with vascular canals of dentine which are arranged vertically parallel to each other, also called 'tubular dentine'. The crowns of these osteodont teeth are covered with a single layer of enameloid. Hybodont teeth served a variety of functions depending on the species, including grinding, crushing (durophagy), tearing, clutching, and even cutting.

Hybodonts are characterized by having two dorsal fins each preceded by a fin spine. The fin spine morphology is unique to each hybodont species. The fin spines are elongate and gently curved towards the rear, with the posterior part of the spine being covered in hooked denticles, typically in two parallel rows running along the length of the spine, sometimes with a ridge between them. Part of the front of the spines are often covered in a ribbed ornamentation, while in some other hybodonts this region is covered in rows of small bumps. The spines are mineralised, and primary composed of osteodentine, while the ornamentation is formed of enamel. Similar fin spines are also found in many extinct chondrichthyan groups as well as in some modern sharks like Heterodontus and squalids. Male hybodonts had either one or two pairs of cephalic spines on their heads, a characteristic distinctive to hybodonts. These spines, while of variable placement, were always placed posterior to the eye socket, and were composed of a base divided into three lobes, with the main part of the spine being backwardly curved, most specimens of which had a barb near the apex. These spines, like the fin spines, were mineralised, with the base composed of osteodentine, while the main part of the spine was covered in enamel. Male hybodonts possessed fin claspers used in mating, like modern sharks. Hybodonts had a fully heterocercal tail fin, where the upper lobe of the fin was much larger than the lower one due to the spine extending into it. Like living sharks and rays, the skin of hybodonts was covered with dermal denticles. Hybodonts laid egg cases, similar to those produced by living cartilaginous fish. Most hybodont egg cases are assigned to the genus Palaeoxyris, which tapers towards both ends, with one end having a tendril which attached to substrate, with the middle section being composed of at least three twisted bands.

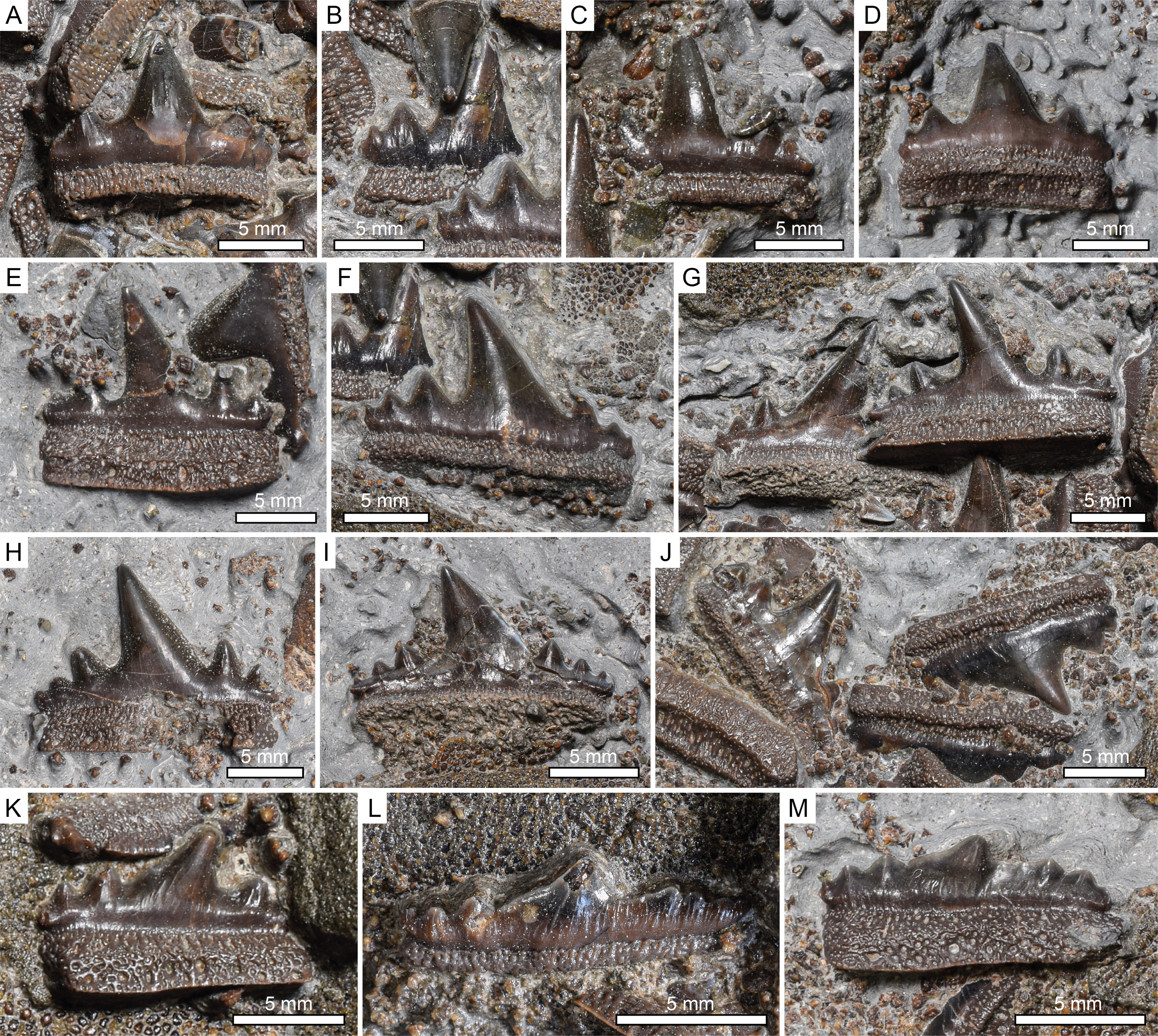
Teeth of Durnovariaodus, a member of the family Hybodontidae

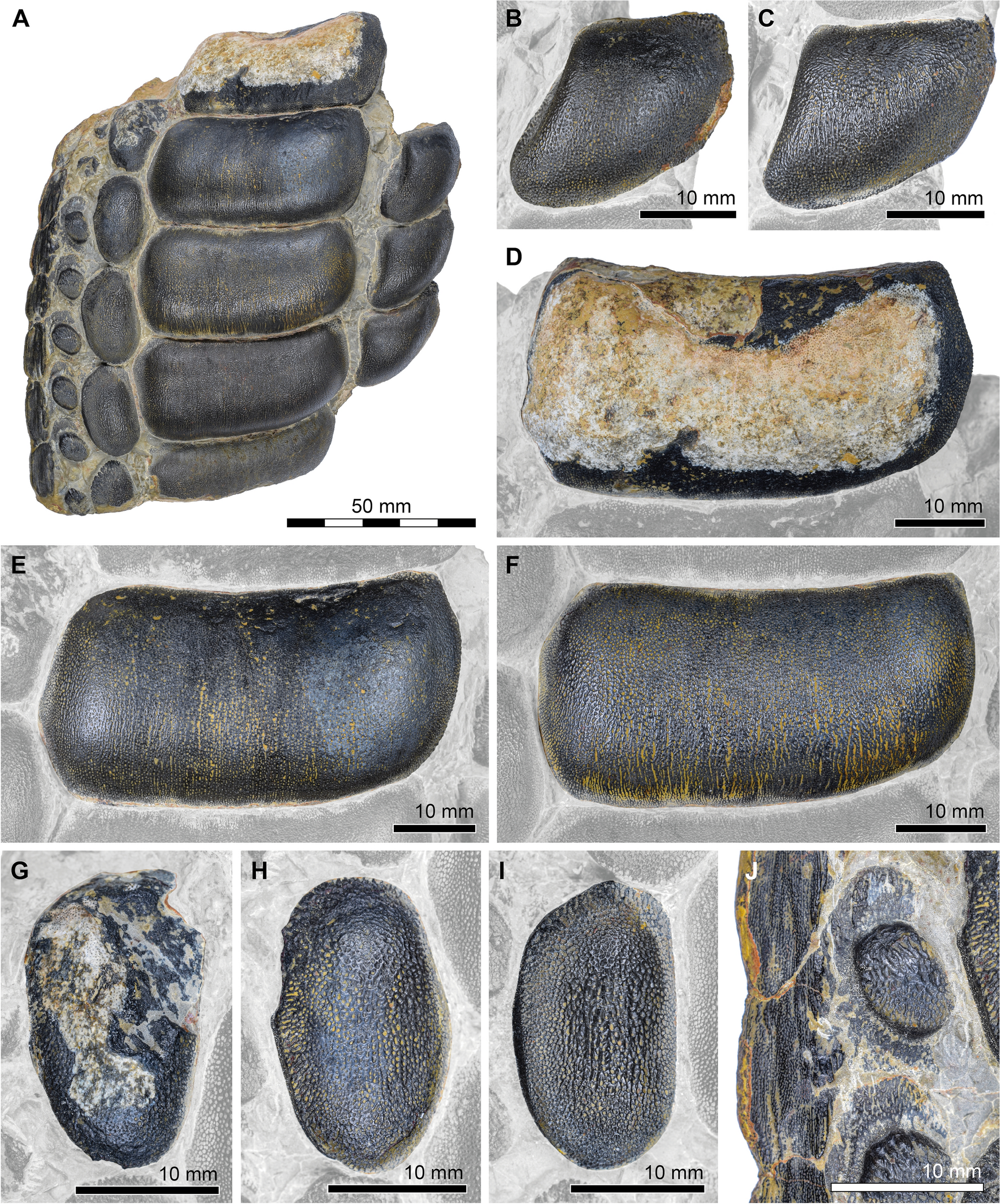
Jaw fragment of Strophodus a specialised durophagous hybodont

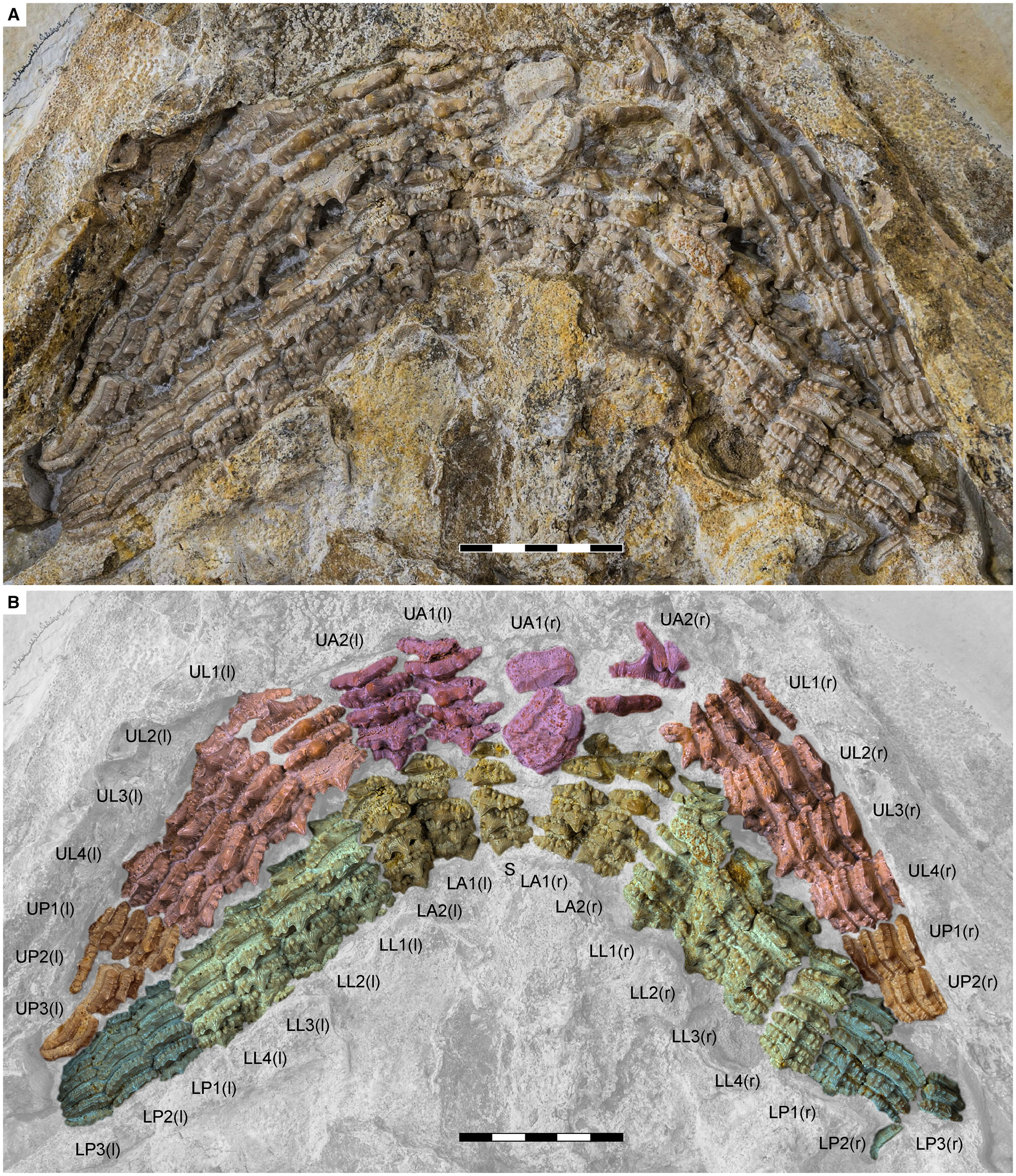
Jaws of Asteracanthus, showing the arrangement of the teeth in jaws. The teeth were designed for grasping

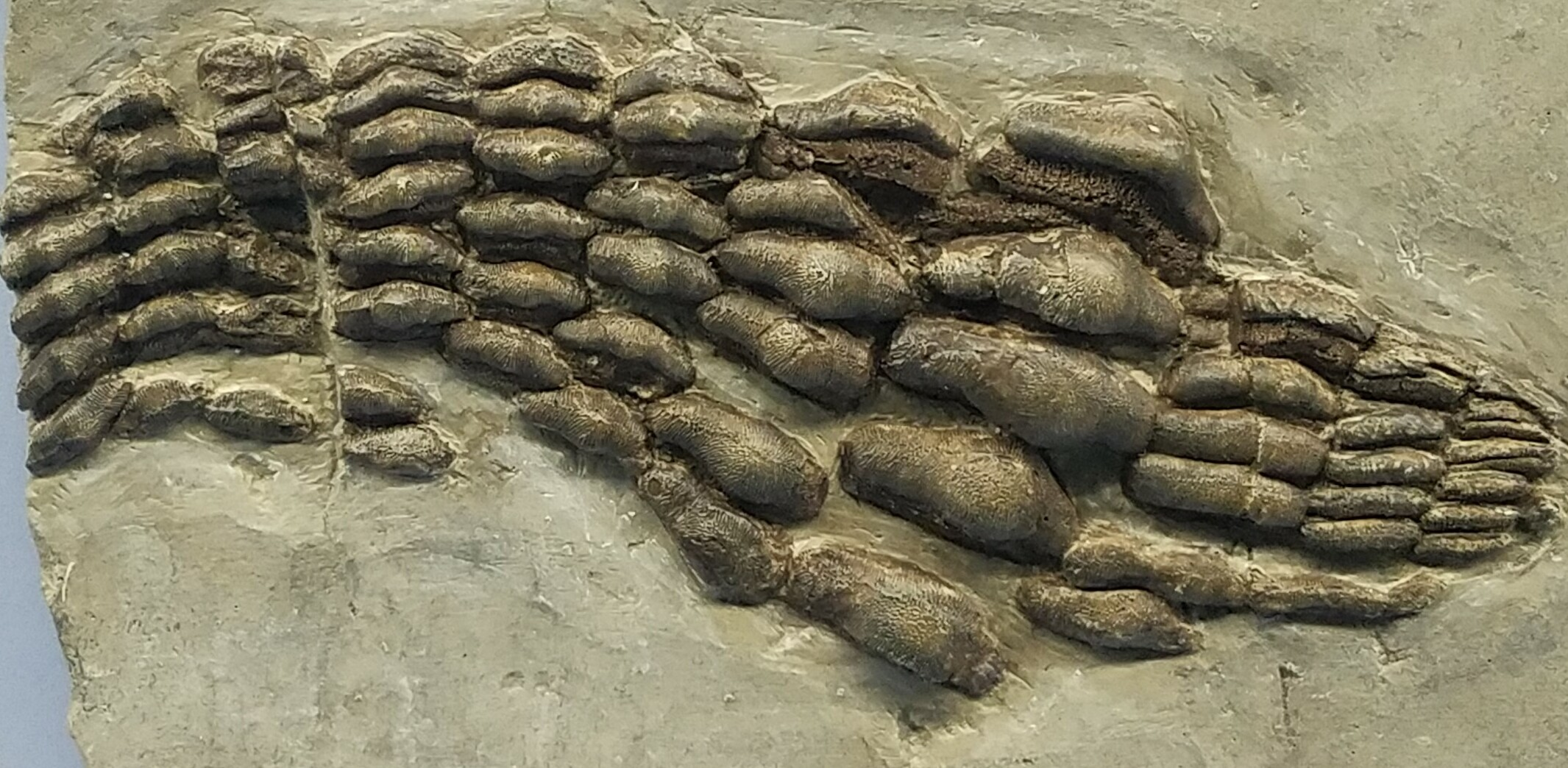
Preserved dentition of the acrodontid Acrodus, which had low, rounded teeth used in durophagy

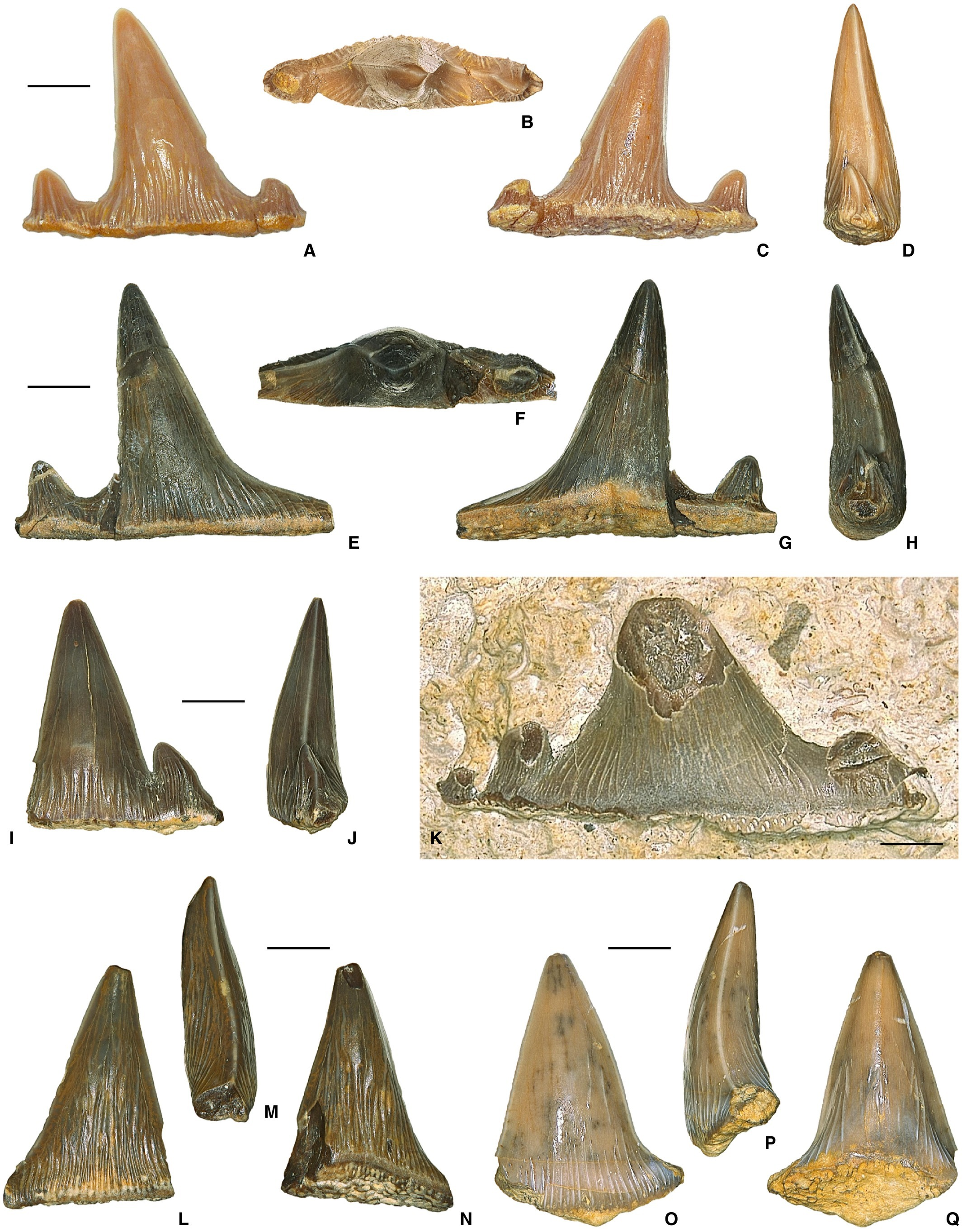
Teeth of Planohybodus, a hybodontid, whose teeth were designed for tearing

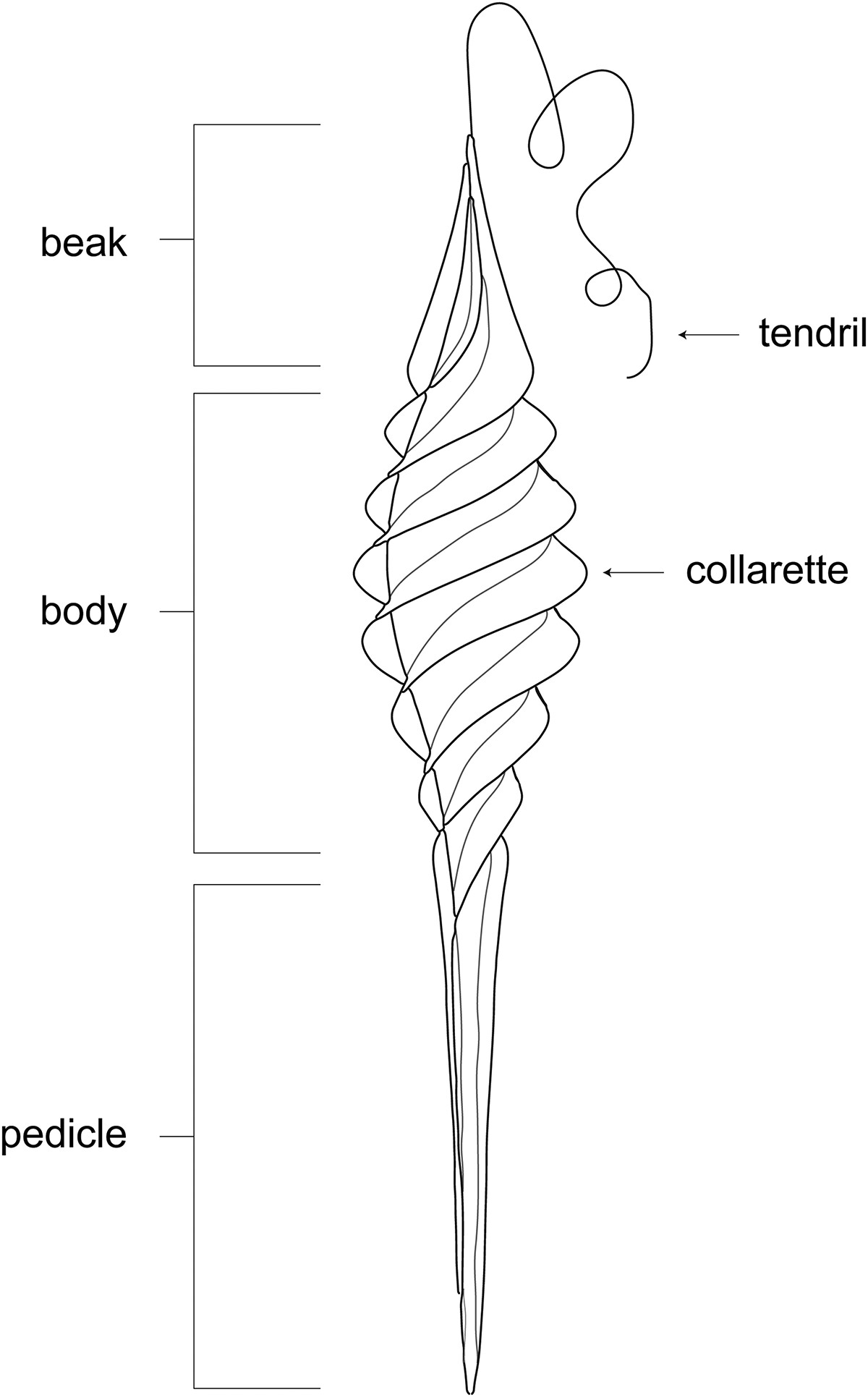
Diagram of Palaeoxyris egg cases, thought to have been produced by hybodonts

== Ecology ==
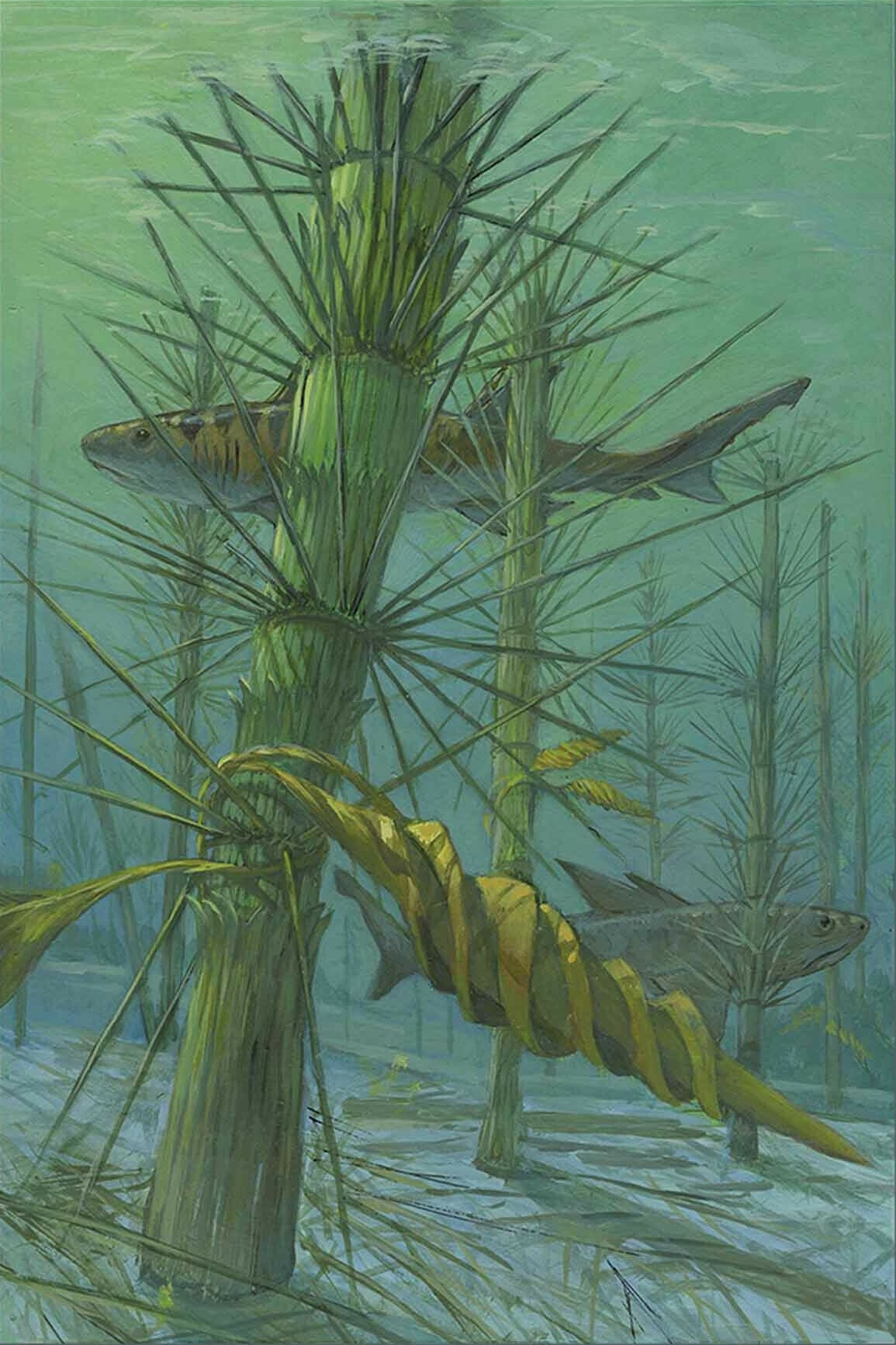
Hybodont egg cases (Palaeoxyris) attached to a Neocalamites stem in an estuarine environment. Art by Michael Rothman

Hybodont fossils are found in depositional environments ranging from marine to fluvial (river deposits). Many hybodonts are thought to have been euryhaline, able to tolerate a wide range of salinities. Hybodonts inhabited freshwater environments from early in their evolutionary history, spanning from the Carboniferous onwards. Based on isotopic analysis, some species of hybodonts are likely to have permanently lived in freshwater environments, while others may have migrated between marine and freshwater environments. One genus of hybodont, Onychoselache of the lower Carboniferous of Scotland, is suggested to have been capable of amphibious locomotion, similar to modern orectolobiform sharks such as bamboo and epaulette sharks, due to its well-developed pectoral fins. It has been suggested that male hybodonts used their cephalic spines to grip females during mating. Preserved egg cases of hybodonts assigned to Palaeoxyris indicate that at least some hybodonts laid their eggs in freshwater and brackish environments, with the eggs being attached to vegetation via a tendril. Laying of eggs in freshwater is not known in any living cartilaginous fish. At least some hybodonts are suggested to have utlilized specific sites as nurseries, such as in the Triassic lake deposits of the Madygen Formation of Kyrgyzstan, where eggs of Lonchidion are suggested to have been laid on the lakeshore or upriver areas, where the juveniles hatched and matured, before migrating deeper into the lake as adults.

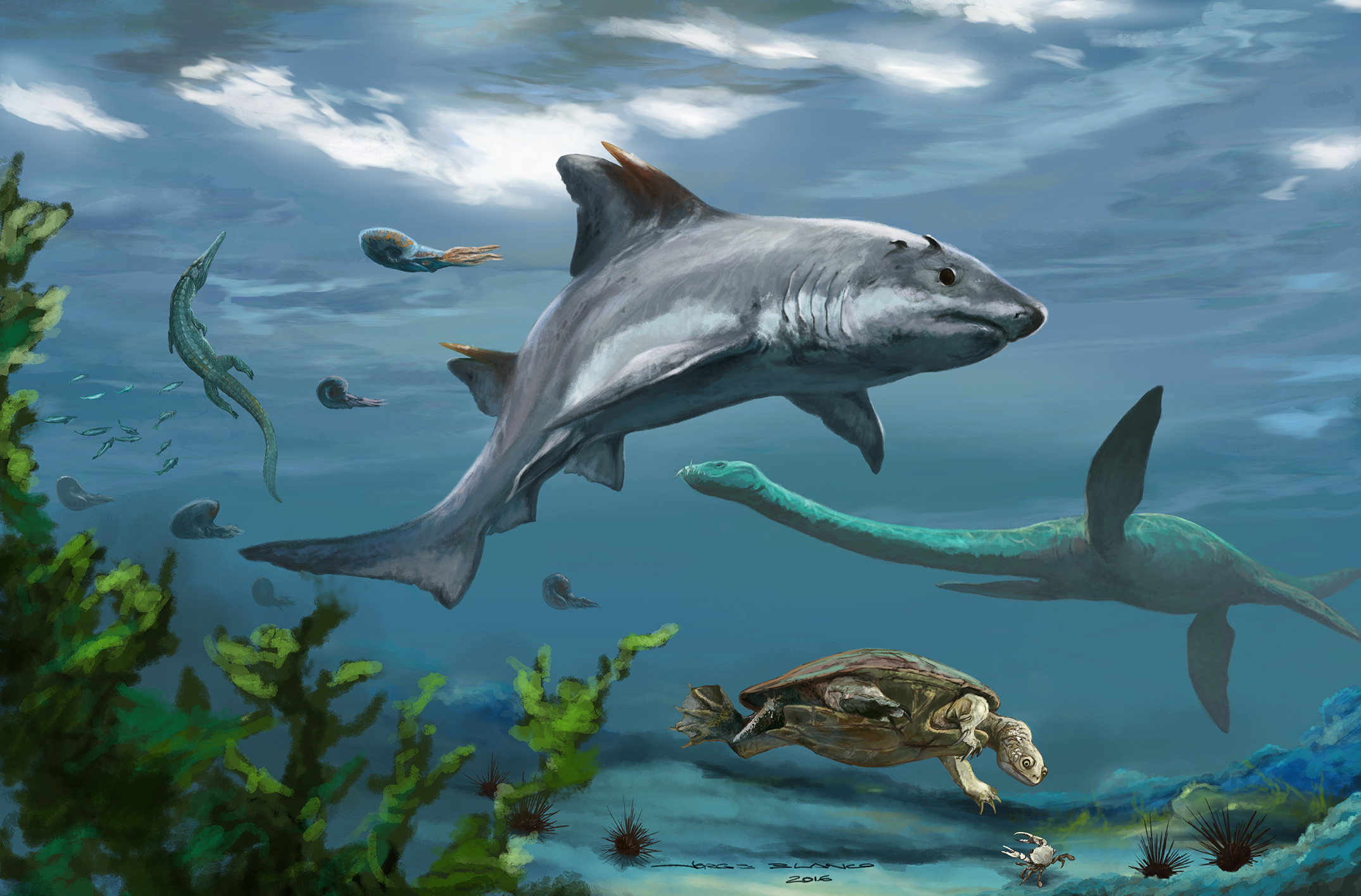
Life restoration of Strophodus rebecae with other contemporary organisms from the Early Cretaceous (Valanginian-Hauterivian) Rosa Blanca Formation of Colombia

Hybodonts are thought to have been generally relatively slow swimmers, though capable of fast bursts of locomotion. Some hybodonts like Hybodus are thought to have been active predators capable of feeding on swiftly moving prey, with preserved stomach contents of a specimen of Hybodus hauffianus indicating that they fed on belemnites (a type of extinct squid-like cephalopod). Hybodonts have a wide variety of tooth shapes. This variety suggests that they took advantage of multiple food sources. It is thought that some hybodonts which had wider, flatter, teeth specialized in crushing or grinding hard-shelled prey (durophagy), with some hybodonts like Asteracanthus probably consuming both hard and soft bodied prey. Often multiple species of hybodonts with different prey preferences coexisted within the same ecosystem.

== Evolutionary history ==
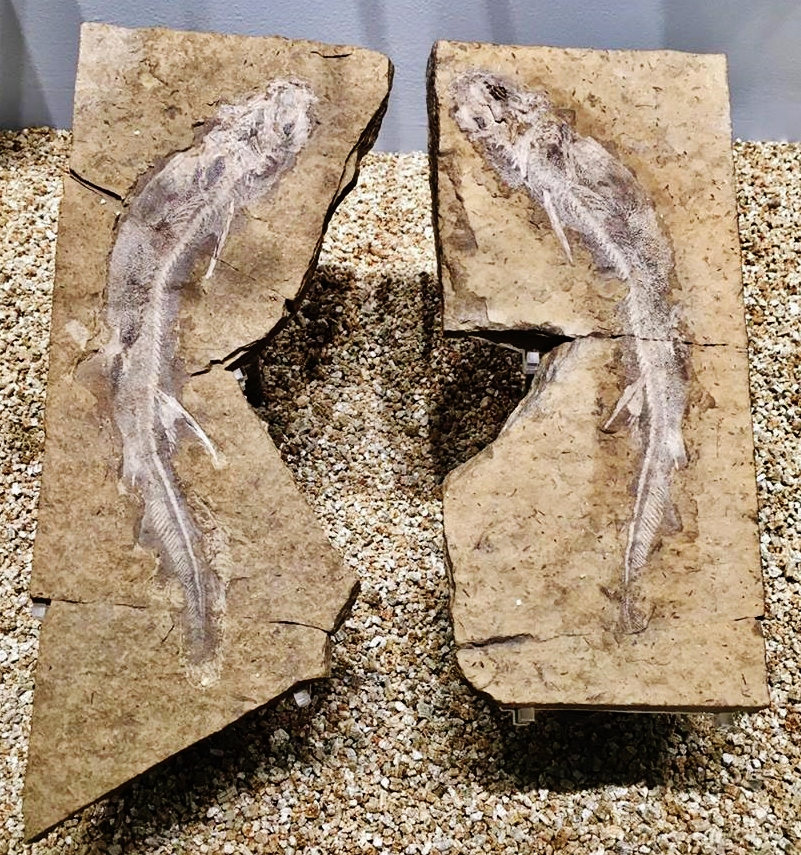
Fossil of Hamiltonichthys a primitive hybodont from the Carboniferous of North America

The earliest hybodont remains are from the latest Devonian (Famennian, ~ 360 million years ago) of Iran, belonging to the genus Roongodus, as well as remains assigned to Lissodus of the same age from Belgium. Carboniferous hybodonts include both durophagous and non-durophagous forms, while durophagous forms were dominant during the Permian period. By the Permian period, hybodonts had a global distribution. The Permian-Triassic extinction event only had a limited effect on hybodont diversity. Maximum hybodont diversity is observed during the Triassic. During the Triassic and Early Jurassic, hybodontiforms were the dominant elasmobranchs in both marine and non-marine environments. A shift in hybodonts was seen during the Middle Jurassic, a transition between the distinctly different assemblages seen in the Triassic – Early Jurassic and the Late Jurassic – Cretaceous. As neoselachians (group of modern sharks) diversified further during the Late Jurassic, hybodontiforms became less prevalent in open marine conditions but remained diverse in fluvial and restricted settings during the Cretaceous. Possible reasons for the replacement of hybodonts by modern sharks include more effective locomotory and jaw movement mechanisms of the latter group. By the end of the Cretaceous, hybodonts had declined to only a handful of species, including members of Lonchidion, and Meristodonoides. The last hybodonts disappeared, seemingly abruptly, as part of the Cretaceous-Paleogene extinction event approximately 66 million years ago.

== Families and genera ==
The taxonomy of hybodonts is considered poorly resolved, so the classification presented should not be taken as authoritative.

- Lonchidiidae Herman, 1977
  - Baharyodon
  - Diplolonchidion
  - Vectiselachos
  - Hylaeobatis
  - Isanodus
  - Parvodus
  - Lissodus?
  - Lonchidion
  - Lonchidionoides
  - Luopingselache
  - Jiaodontus
  - Pristrisodus
- Distobatidae
  - Distobatus
  - Reticulodus
  - Tribodus?
  - Aegyptobatus
- Acrodontidae
  - Acrodus
  - Strophodus?
- Hybodontidae
  - Dicrenodus
  - Egertonodus
  - Hybodus
  - Meristodonoides
  - Planohybodus
  - Priohybodus
  - Sphenonchus
  - Durnonovariaodus
  - Crassodus
- Thaiodontidae
  - Khoratodus
  - Thaiodus
- Incertae sedis
  - Tribodus
  - Strophodus
  - Asteracanthus
  - Roongodus
  - Polyacrodus
  - Palaeobates
  - Bdellodus
  - Acrorhizodus
  - Arctacanthus
  - Reesodus
  - Steinbachodus
  - Onychoselache
  - Omanoselache
  - Pororhiza
  - Mukdahanodus
  - Secarodus
  - Hamiltonichthys
  - Gansuselache
  - Dabasacanthus
  - Teresodus
  - Diablodontus
  - Gunnellodus?
  - Heteroptychodus
  - Lissodus
  - Columnaodus
  - Carinacanthus
- Form genera
  - Palaeoxyris (genus used for the egg capsules of hybodonts)
