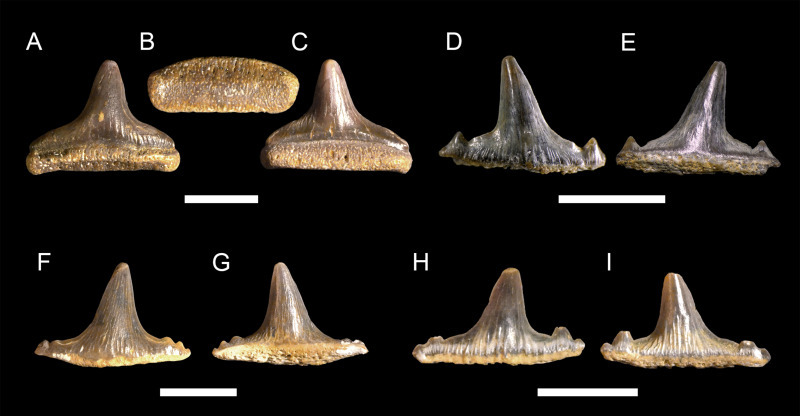
- Teeth of Meristodonoides sp. from the Late Cretaceous of Russia

Scientific classification
- Kingdom: Animalia
- Phylum: Chordata
- Class: Chondrichthyes
- Order: †Hybodontiformes
- Family: †Hybodontidae
- Genus: †Meristodonoides; Underwood & Cumbaa, 2010

Type species
- †Hybodus rajkovichi Case, 2001

Species
- See text

= Meristodonoides =

Meristodonoides Temporal range: Aptian–Maastrichtian Possible Late Jurassic records

Extinct genus of hybodont chondrichthyans

Meristodonoides is an extinct genus of hybodont known from the mid-late Cretaceous, with potential records dating back to the Jurassic. It is one of a number of hybodont genera composed of species formerly assigned to Hybodus.

The genus is primarily known from remains from the Cretaceous of North America and Europe, spanning from the Aptian/Albian to Maastrichtian, making it one of the last surviving hybodont genera, though records of the genus likely extend as far back as the Late Jurassic, based on an undescribed skeleton from the Tithonian of England, and fragmentary teeth from the Kimmeridgian of Poland, England and Switzerland.

== Taxonomy ==
The type species is M. rajkovichi, which was originally a species in the genus Hybodus. The species, along with other Hybodus species such as H. butleri and H. montanensis, was reassigned to Meristodonoides by Charlie J. Underwood and Stephen L. Cumbaa in 2010.

=== Species ===
- M. butleri (Thurmond, 1971) - Aptian/Albian of Texas
- M. montanensis (Case, 1978) - Campanian of Montana and Wyoming, with similar remains from the Santonian of New Mexico
- M. novojerseyensis (Case & Cappetta, 2004) - Campanian of North Carolina, Maastrichtian of New Jersey
- M. rajkovichi (Case, 2001) (type species) - Cenomanian of Minnesota
- M. multiplicatus Cicimurri et al., 2014 - Santonian-Campanian of Mississippi
- Other remains of the genus are known from the Coniacian of England, the Aptian-Albian of France, and the Campanian of British Columbia, Canada, European Russia and France.

== Ecology ==
Life restoration of M. montanensis

The morphology of the teeth suggests an adaptation to tearing prey, with a specialization for restraining fast-swimming prey such as small fish and squid, as well as weakly armored prey. Fossils from the Western Interior Seaway suggest that it preferred nearshore marine environments, being absent from deeper-water areas, with it likely also being able to tolerate brackish and freshwater conditions. In the Gulf Coastal Plain, Meristodonoides teeth are largely found in estuarine deposits. The restriction of Meristodonoides to nearshore habitats, combined with its late occurrence, fits the overall decline in niches occupied by hybodonts throughout the Cretaceous, likely due to them being outcompeted by lamniform sharks in open marine habitats. However, some Meristonoides teeth have also been recovered from deep-water deposits representing open marine environments, such as the Northumberland Formation in Canada.
