= Egertonodus =

Egertonodus Temporal range: Oxfordian - Albian, 161–100 Ma

Scientific classification
- Kingdom: Animalia
- Phylum: Chordata
- Class: Chondrichthyes
- Order: †Hybodontiformes
- Family: †Hybodontidae
- Genus: †Egertonodus; Maisey, 1987

Species
- †Egertonodus basanus; †Egertonodus duffini; †Egertonodus fraasi?

Extinct genus of cartilaginous fishes

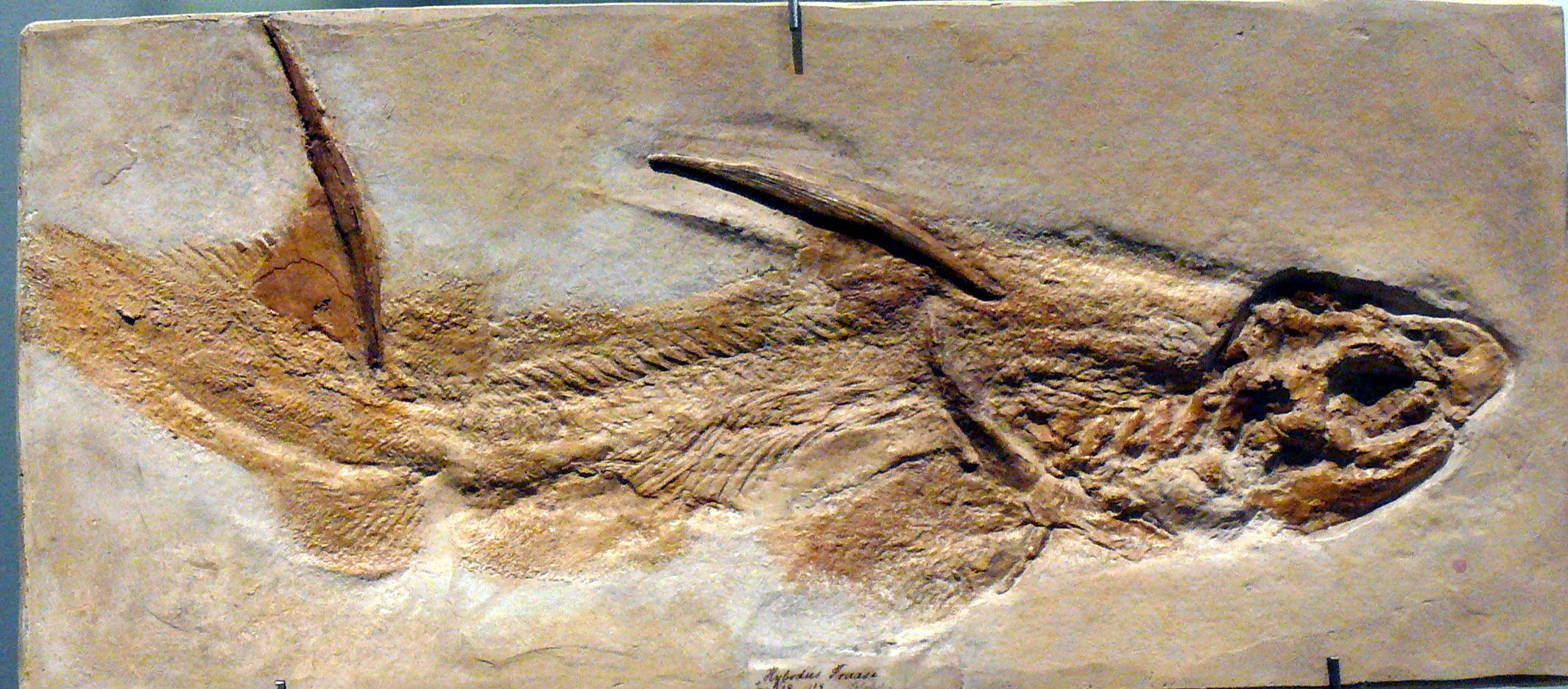
Skeleton of "Egertonodus" fraasi from the Late Jurassic of Germany, whose placement in the genus has been doubted.

Egertonodus is an extinct genus of shark-like hybodont fish. It includes E. basanus from the Jurassic of Europe and North Africa and Cretaceous of North America, North Africa and Europe, and E. duffini from the Middle Jurassic of England. Indeterminate remains of the genus have been reported from the Early Cretaceous of Asia. E. basanus is known from preserved skull material, while E. duffini is only known from teeth. The genus is distinguished from Hybodus sensu stricto by characters of the skull and teeth. E. basanus, the most common species, is thought to have reached 1.5 m (4 ft 11in) in length. E. fraasi from the Late Jurassic of Germany, known from a poorly preserved full body fossil, was placed in Egertonodus in one study, but this has been subsequently questioned by other authors, due to strong differences in tooth morphology from the type species. Fossils have been found in freshwater and lagoonal environments.
