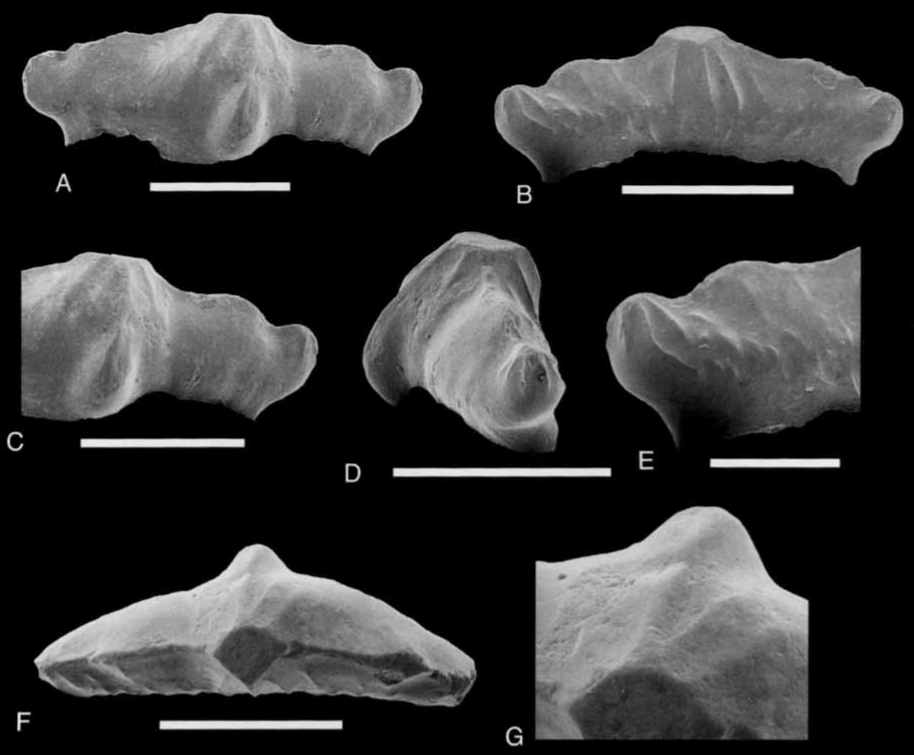
- Teeth of an indeterminate species from the Tendaguru Formation
- Life restoration of Lonchidion

Scientific classification
- Kingdom: Animalia
- Phylum: Chordata
- Class: Chondrichthyes
- Order: †Hybodontiformes
- Family: †Lonchidiidae
- Genus: †Lonchidion; Estes, 1964

= Lonchidion =

Lonchidion Temporal range: Middle Triassic to Late Cretaceous Ladinian–Maastrichtian

Extinct genus of hybodont cartilaginous fishes

Lonchidion is a genus of extinct hybodont in the family Lonchidiidae. The genus first appears in the fossil record during the Middle Triassic (Ladinian) and was among the last surviving hybodont genera, with its youngest known fossils dating to the very end of the Cretaceous (Maastrichtian).

Lonchidion was first described by Richard Estes in 1964, and the type species is L. selachas. Fossils of Lonchidion have been found worldwide. The genus has been proposed to be euryhaline, and is often found in freshwater and brackish deposits. Hybodont egg cases (Palaeoxyris) associated with juvenile teeth of L. ferganensis in the Triassic lake deposits of the Madygen Formation of Kyrgyzstan suggests that this species spawned in freshwater environments, with Palaeoxyris egg cases found in freshwater deposits of the Late Triassic Chinle Formation in North America suggested to have been produced by Lonchidion humblei.

While the genus is primarily known from teeth, a preserved body impression of a subadult individual is known from the Early Cretaceous freshwater Las Hoyas site in Spain. This specimen is among the smallest known elasmobranchs, at around 3.5 centimetres (1.4 in) in length. Other possible body remains of Lonchidion have been reported from other Early Cretaceous sites in Spain. Lonchidion humblei is suggested to have reached an adult length of 25 centimetres (9.8 in).

The teeth of the genus are low crowned, and probably served to grind hard prey (durophagy). Some authors have proposed that Lonchidion is not a valid genus, and that its teeth instead represent a morphological type present among many juvenile hybodonts but that is later lost in adults.

== Species ==
- Lonchidion anitae Thurmond, 1971
- Lonchidion breve Patterson, 1966
- Lonchidion crenulatum Patterson, 1966
- Lonchidion humblei Murry, 1981
- Lonchidion indicus Yadagiri, 1986
- Lonchidion inflexum Underwood & Rees, 2002
- Lonchidion microselachos Estes & Sanchíz, 1982
- Lonchidion minimorsus Keeble et al., 2026
- Lonchidion selachas Estes, 1964
- Lonchidion selachos Estes, 1964
- Lonchidion striatum Patterson, 1966
- Lonchidion ferganensis Fischer et al., 2011
- Lonchidion conrugis Wick & Lehman, 2025
- Lonchidion khoratensis Cuny, Suteethorn, Kamha, Buffetaut, Philippe, 2006
