= Heteroptychodus =

Heteroptychodus Temporal range: Early Cretaceous

Scientific classification
- Kingdom: Animalia
- Phylum: Chordata
- Class: Chondrichthyes
- Order: †Hybodontiformes
- Genus: †Heteroptychodus; Yabe and Obata, 1930

Species
- †Heteroptychodus chuvalovi; †Heteroptychodus kokutensis; †Heteroptychodus steinmanni

Extinct genus of cartilaginous fish

Heteroptychodus is an extinct genus of hybodont that lived in Asia during the Early Cretaceous period. It had low, rounded durophagous teeth that are covered in ridges. Species have been reported from Japan, Mongolia, Malaysia, Thailand, Southern China, and possibly Kyrgyzstan. Fossils have been found in freshwater environments.
