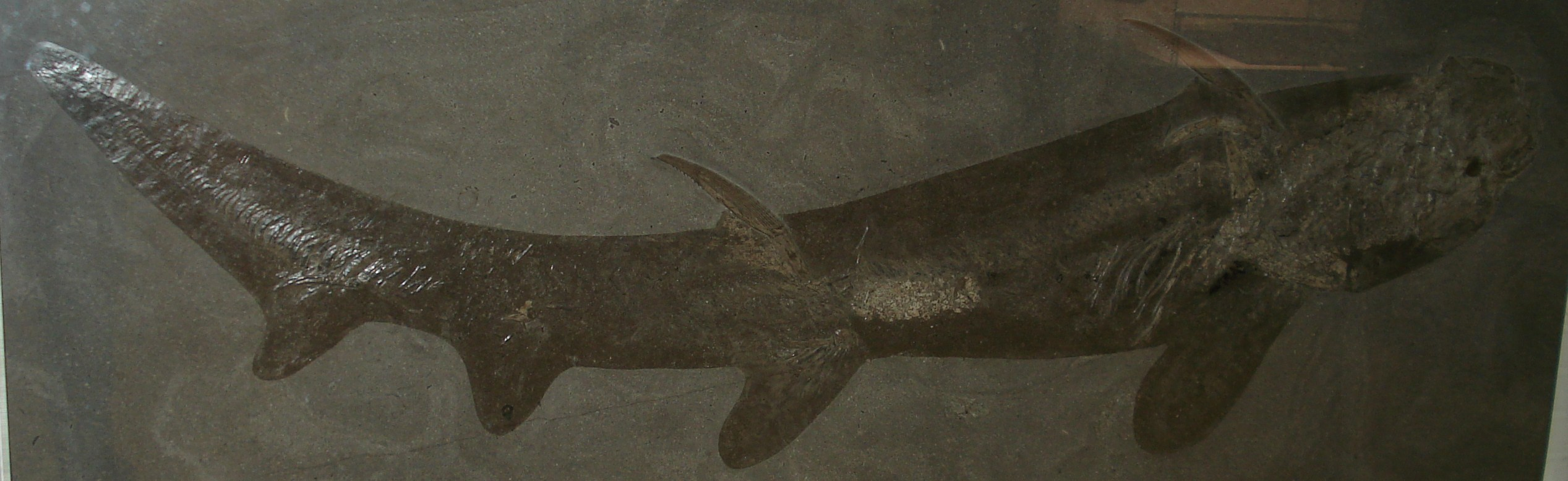
- Hybodus hauffianus
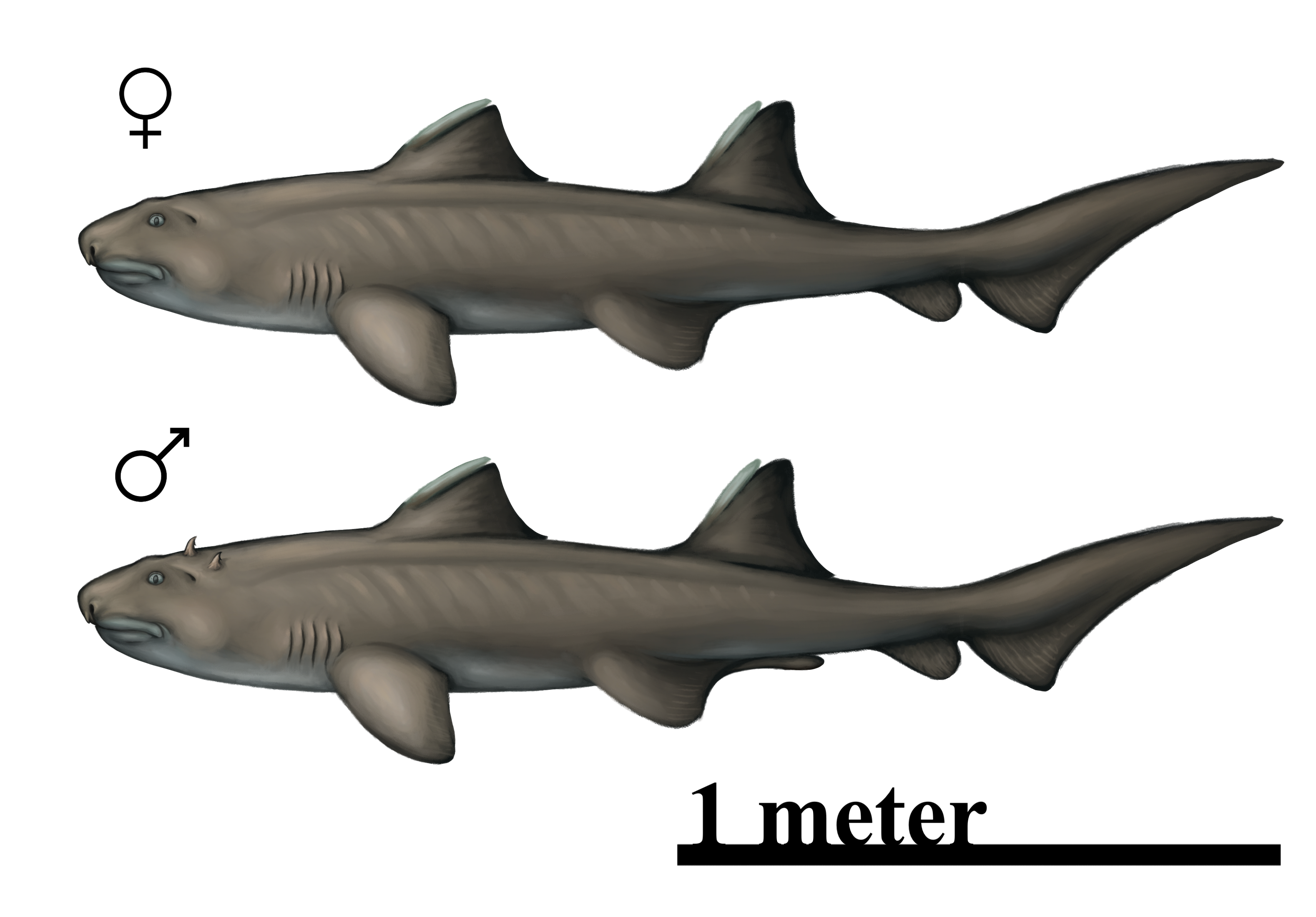
- Life restoration of Hybodus hauffianus, showing female (top) and male (bottom)

Scientific classification
- Kingdom: Animalia
- Phylum: Chordata
- Class: Chondrichthyes
- Order: †Hybodontiformes
- Family: †Hybodontidae
- Genus: †Hybodus; Agassiz, 1837

Type species
- †Hybodus reticulatus Agassiz, 1837

Species (sensu stricto)
- †H. reticulatus; †H. hauffianus

= Hybodus =

Hybodus Temporal range: Early Jurassic

Extinct genus of cartilaginous fishes

Hybodus (from Greek: ύβος hybos, 'crooked' and Greek: ὀδούς odoús 'tooth') is an extinct genus of hybodont. Numerous species have been assigned to Hybodus spanning a large period of time, and it is currently considered a wastebasket taxon that is 'broadly polyphyletic' and requires reexamination. It has been suggested that Hybodus sensu stricto only consists of two species, the type species H. reticulatus and H. hauffianus, both known from the Early Jurassic of Europe, with H. obtusus from the Middle-Late Jurassic of Europe possibly also being a true species of Hybodus.

== Description ==
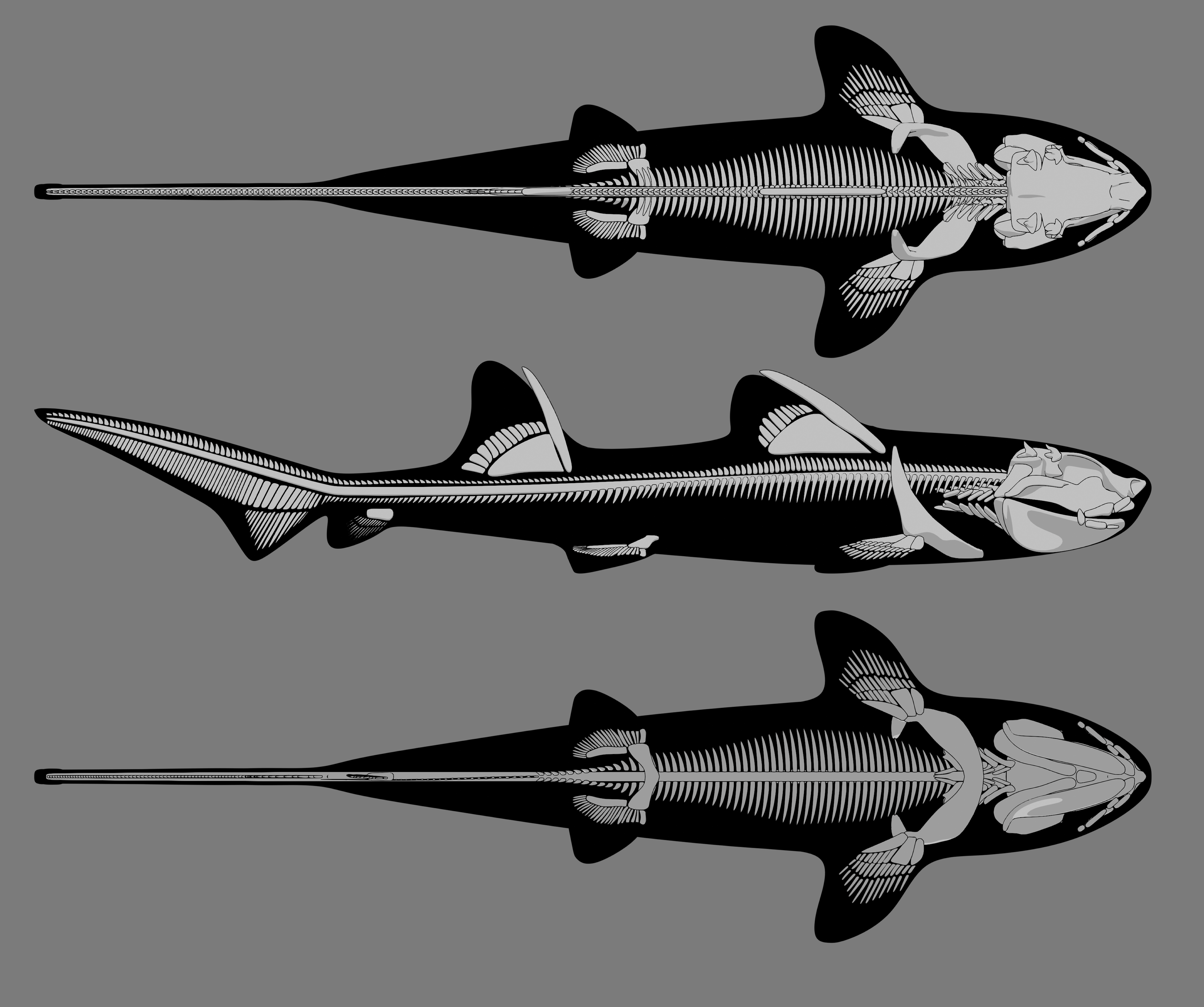
Skeletal reconstruction of an indeterminate species of Hybodus

Hybodus species typically grew to about 2 metres (6.6 ft) in length, with larger specimens of H. hauffianus reaching about 3 metres (9.8 ft). It possessed a streamlined body shape similar to modern sharks, with two similarly sized dorsal fins. As in other Hybodontiformes, dentinous fin spines were present on the dorsal fins of Hybodus, which in this genus exhibit a rib-like ornamentation located towards the tip of the spine, with rows of hooked denticles present on the posterior side. The males possessed claspers, specialized organs that directly insert sperm into the female, and which are still present in modern sharks.

== Species ==
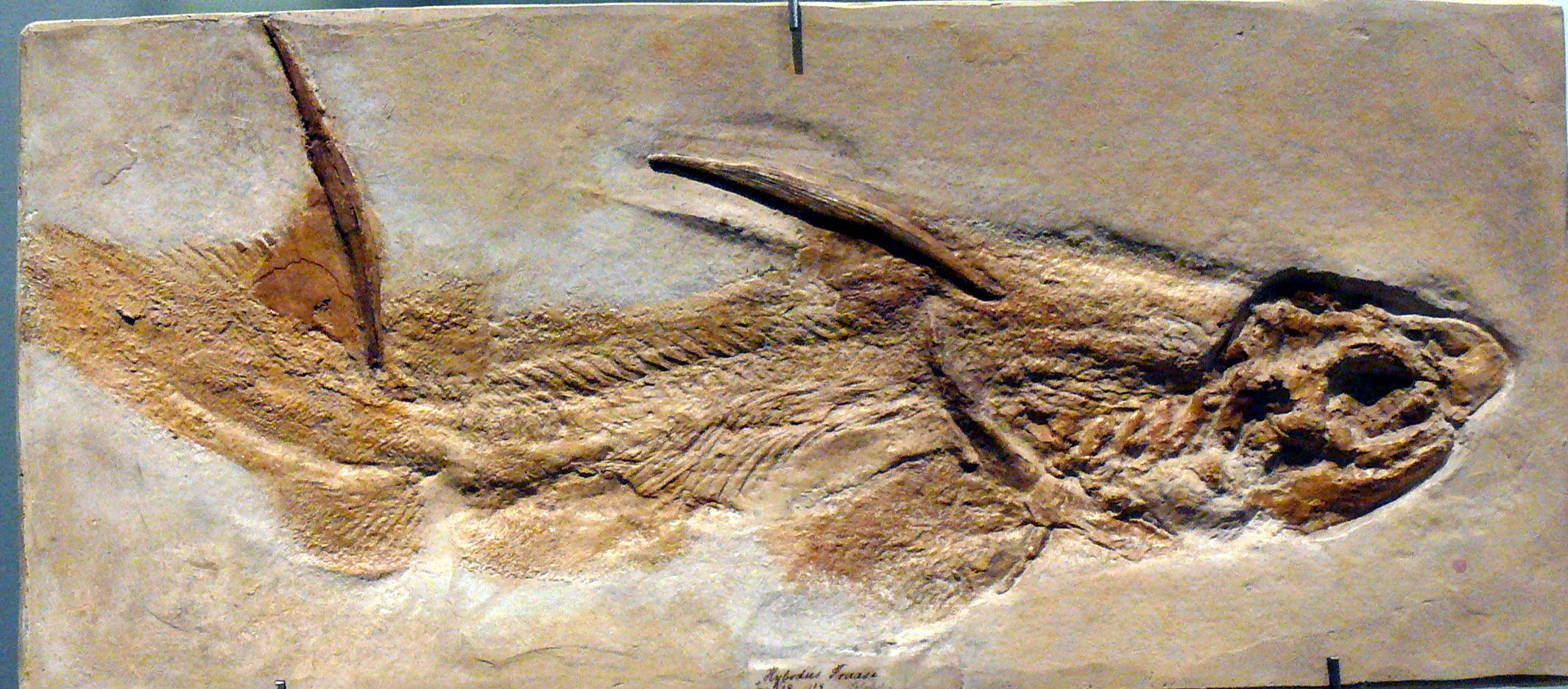
Specimen of "Hybodus" fraasi from the Solnhofen Limestone of Germany, which is now tentatively included in Egertonodus

Several Hybodus species, including H. butleri, H. rajkovichi, and H. montanensis, were later reassigned to Meristodonoides. H. basanus and H. fraasi are now included in the genus Egertonodus, though the placement of the latter in the Egertonodus is considered tentative, due to the strong differences in tooth morphology between the two species. H. obtusus represents a junior synonym of Asteracanthus ornatissimus. Multiple Triassic species previously assigned to Hybodus including H. microdus, H. yohi, H. zuodengensis and H. bugarensis are not hybodonts and most likely belong to an entirely separate order Synechodontiformes. Two new species from China, H. xinzhuangensis and H. chuanjieensis are named in 2018, and H. houtienensis is considered, while other species from China and Thailand are no longer part of the genus and requires reassessment. However, the only two species that should be retained within the genus Hybodus are the type species H. reticulatus and the other species H. hauffianus. The problem is that even those two species require reassessment.

== Paleobiology ==
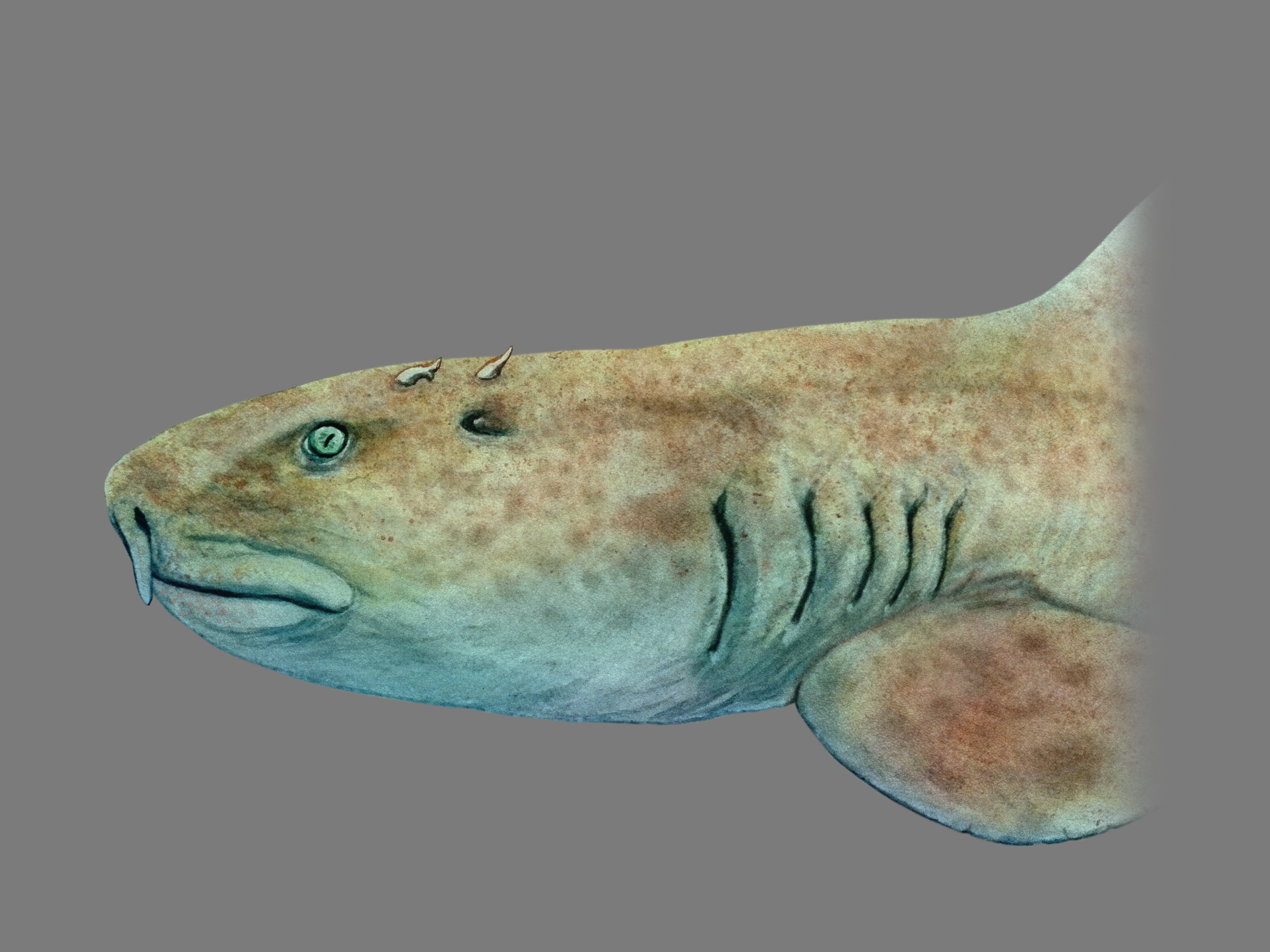
A reconstruction of the head of Hybodus

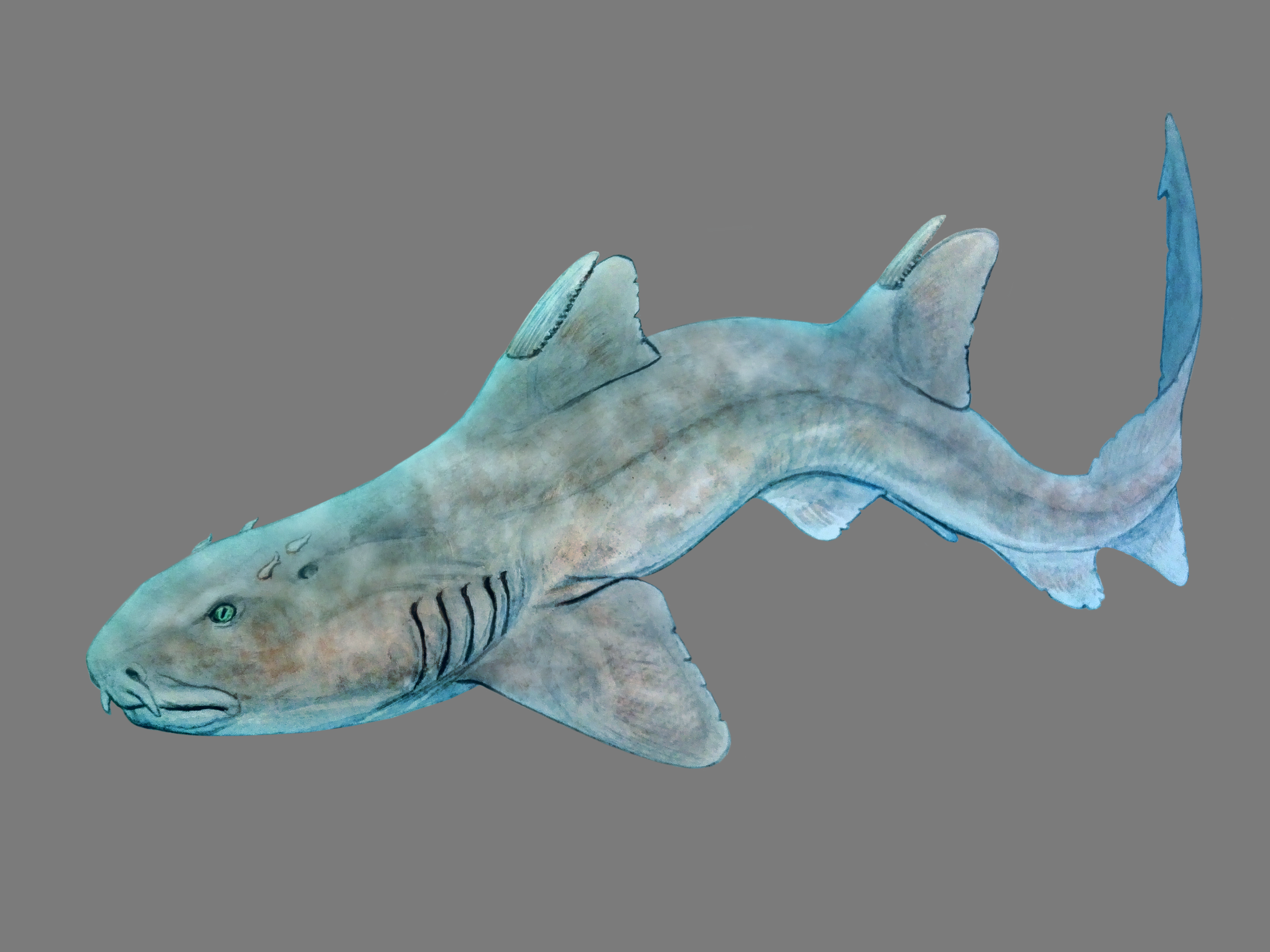
A reconstruction of the full body of Hybodus, displaying anguilliform locomotion

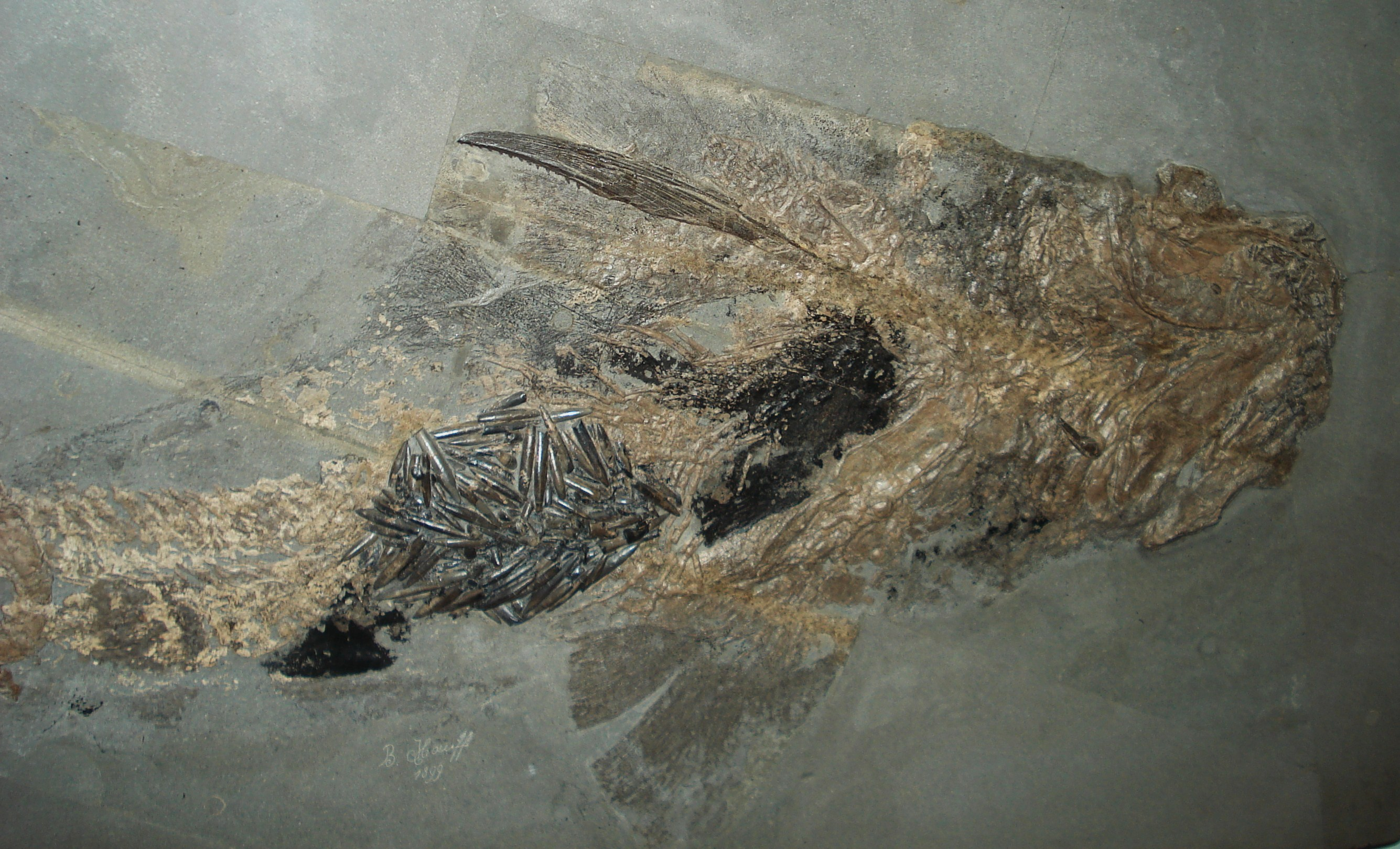
Large numbers of belemnite rostra have been found as gut contents in Hybodus fossils

Hybodus is thought to have been an active predator which was capable of consuming swiftly moving prey, probably predominantly cephalopods and, to a lesser extent, fish. Based on fossilized stomach contents, it has been proposed that Hybodus was a more active hunter than its close relatives like Asteracanthus, which likely fed on benthic prey. A preserved specimen of Hybodus hauffianus has been found with over 100 belemnite (a type of extinct squid-like cephalopod) rostra (hard mineralized internal elements) in its stomach, which may have resulted in its death. Hybodus' varied dentition would have allowed it to opportunistically exploit a variety of food sources; sharper teeth would have been used to catch slippery prey (such as fish), while flatter teeth probably helped them crush shelled animals (such as snails, sea urchins, crustaceans, and shellfish). The large spines on the first and second dorsal fins were likely defensive structures intended to protect against attacks from Hybodus' own predators.

== Sources ==
- Haines, Tim; Paul Chambers (2006). The Complete Guide to Prehistoric Life. Canada: Firefly Books. p. 89.
- Diffily, Deborah; Karen Carr (2004). Jurassic Shark. HarperCollins Publishers.
