= Ichnofacies =

Trace fossil

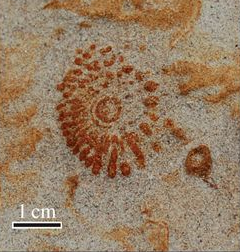
Psilonichnus

An ichnofacies is an assemblage of trace fossils that provides an indication of the conditions that their formative organisms inhabited.

== Concept ==
Trace fossil assemblages are far from random; the range of fossils recorded in association is constrained by the environment in which the trace-making organisms dwelt. Palaeontologist Adolf Seilacher pioneered the concept of ichnofacies, whereby the state of a sedimentary system at its time of deposition could be deduced by noting the trace fossils in association with one another.

== Significance ==
Ichnofacies can provide information about water depth, salinity, turbidity and energy. In general, traces found in shallower water are vertical, those in deeper water are more horizontal and patterned. This is partly because of the relative abundance of suspended food particles, such as plankton, in the shallower waters of the photic zone, and partly because vertical burrows are more secure in the turbulent conditions of shallow water. In deeper waters, there is a necessary transition to sediment feeding (extracting nutrients from the mud). Food availability, hence trace type, is also controlled by energy: high energy environments keep food particles suspended, whereas in lower energy areas, food settles out evenly, and burrows will tend to spread out to cover as much area as economically as possible.

Ichnofacies have a major advantage over using body fossils to gauge the same factors: body fossils can be transported, but trace fossils are always in situ.

== Recognized invertebrate ichnofacies ==
Marine Invertebrate Ichnofacies
Name	Common Ichnogenera	Substrate	Inferred Paleoenvironment
Scoyenia	Skolithos, Cruziana, Diplichnites, Rusophycus	Variable - typically sandstones; red beds may be nearby	Diagnostic of terrestrial/freshwater facies.
Psilonichnus	Psilonichnus, Coenobichnus, Cellicalichnus, Macanopsis	Highly variable grain size, sand, soft substrate	Coastal barrier islands, strand plains, delta plains, estuaries, lagoons, and bays.
Trypanites	Entobia, Trypanites, Gastrochaenolites, Caulostrepsis, Maeandropolydora, Conchotrema	Hardground, endurated substrates	Coastal cliffs, reefs, beachrock
Teredolites	Teredolites, Thalassinoides	Resistant woody and coaly substrates	Driftwood, peat
Glossifungites	Diplocraterion, Skolithos, Spongeliomorpha, Rhizocorallium, Arenicolites, Thalassinoides, Fuersichnus	Firmground, dewatered muds	Shallow, marginal marine, deltaic or estuarine erosion surfaces.
Skolithos	Skolithos, Ophiomorpha, Arenicolites, Diplocraterion	Unconsolidated littoral sands	Beaches and sandy tidal flats, shallow water, foreshore to upper-shoreface, above wavebase
Cruziana	Arthrophycus, Phycodes, Rhizocorallium, Teichichnus, Arenicolites, Rosselia, Bergaueria, Thalassinoides, Lockeia, Protovirgularia, Curvolithus, Dimorphichnus, Cruziana, Rusophycus	Sand and silt heterolithic successions and organic detritus	Mid to distal continental shelves. Below normal wave base, but not necessarily below storm wave base
Zoophycos	Zoophycos, Phycosiphon, Chondrites	Marine softground, impure sands and silts	Deeper water, bottom of shelf; turbidite facies
Nereites	Nereites, Megagrapton, Protopaleodictyon, Spirophycus, Helminthoraphe, Glockerichnus, Spiroraphe, Cosmoraphe, Urohelminthoida, Desmograpton, Paleodictyon, Scolicia	Fine-grained muds and clays interbedded with turbidite silts	Deep water, pelagic, base-of-slope turbidity systems

== Recognized vertebrate ichnofacies ==
Vertebrate Ichnofacies
Name	Common Ichnogenera	Substrate	Inferred Paleoenvironment
Chelichnus (Laoporus)	Chelichnus, Brasilichnium	Unconsolidated, larger-grained sands	Aeolian sand dunes
Grallator	Grallator, Jindongornipes, Koreanoformis, Avipeda, Brachychirotherium, Rhynchosauroides, Eubrontes		Lacustrine shorelines
Brontopodus	Charirichnium, Ceratopsipes, Amblydactylus, Brontopodus	Clastic or carbonate	Coastal plain, marine shoreline
Batrachichnus	Batrachichnus, Limnopus, Amphisauropus, Dromopus, Dimetropus, Gilmoreichnus, Chirotherium		Tidal flat-fluvial plain
Characichnos	Characichnos, Undichna, Lunichnium, Puertollanopus, Serpentichnus, Batrachichnus, Hatcherichnus	Semi-consolidated firmgrounds	Subaqueous lacustrine, estuarine, and deltaic environments

== See also ==
- Trace fossil classification
- Bioturbation
