= Queenston Formation =

Geologic formation in Ontario and New York

- Stratigraphic range: Maysvillian to Richmondian
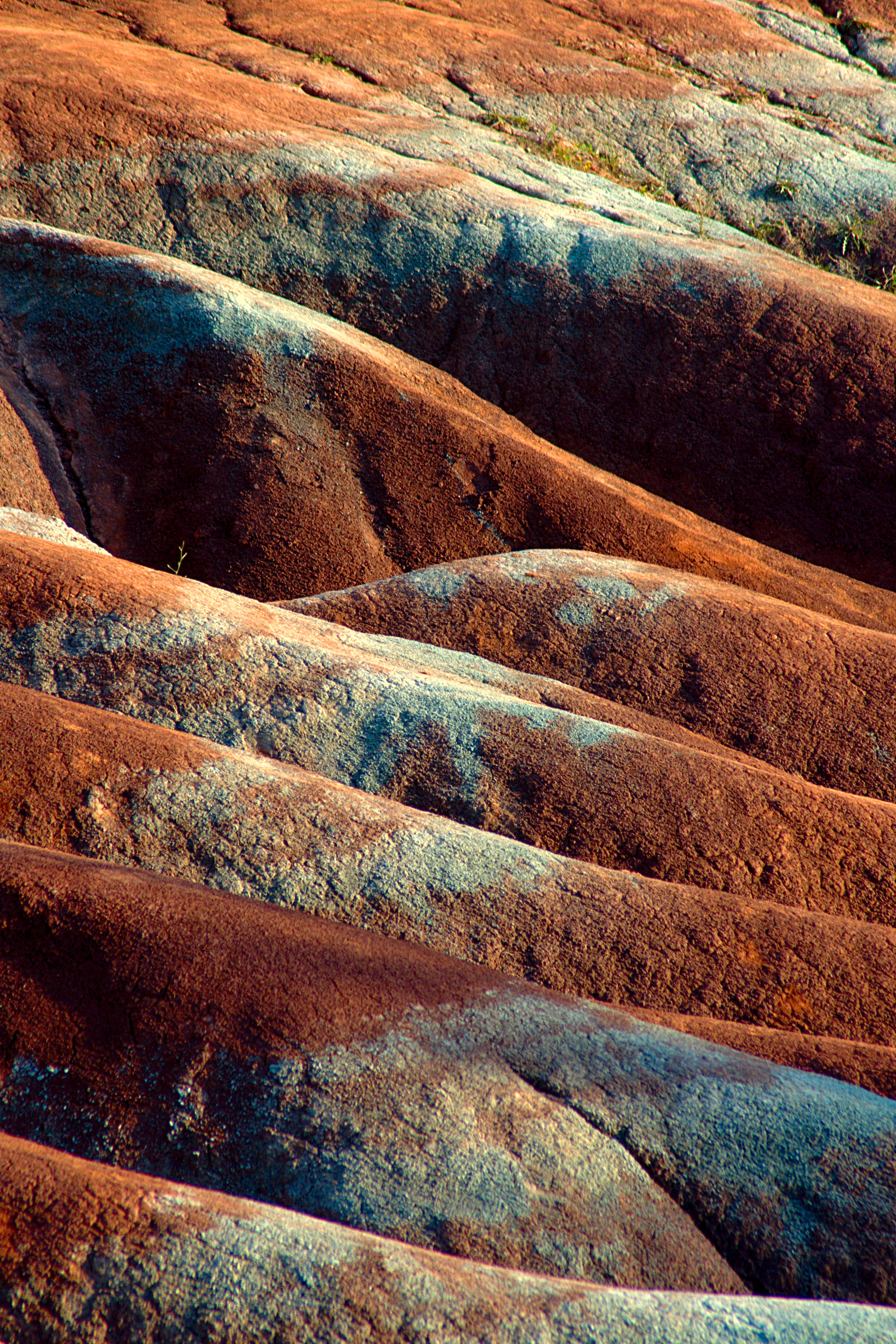
- Queenston Formation exposed at the Cheltenham Badlands
- Type: Geological formation
- Underlies: Cataract Group and Clinton Formation
- Overlies: Cincinnati Group/Georgian Bay Formation / Carlsbad Formation / Oswego Formation
- Thickness: Up to 300 m (980 ft)

Lithology
- Primary: Shale
- Other: Siltstone, sandstone, limestone, gypsum

Location
- Region: Ohio, Southern Ontario; Western New York
- Country: Canada, United States

Type section
- Named for: Queenston, Ontario
- Named by: J. F. Caley
- Year defined: 1940

The Queenston Formation is a geological formation of Upper Ordovician age (Maysvillian to Richmondian Stage), which outcrops in Ontario, Canada (along the northern and eastern flanks of the Niagara Escarpment, as well as east of Ottawa) and New York, United States (just south of Lake Ontario). A typical outcrop of the formation is exposed at Bronte Creek just south of the Queen Elizabeth Way. The formation is a part of the Queenston Delta clastic wedge, formed as an erosional response to the Taconic Orogeny. Lithologically, the formation is dominated by red and grey shales with thin siltstone, limestone and sandstone interlayers. As materials, comprising the clastic wedge, become coarser in close proximity to the Taconic source rocks, siltstone and sandstone layers are predominant in New York.

== Structure and stratigraphy ==
The formation is wedge-shaped, thick (up to 300 metres (980 ft) below Lake Erie), and laterally extensive, outcropping from Western New York to Cabot Head. It thins from southeast to northwest at around 0.6 metres per kilometre and has a dip of 3° to the south-southwest.

The formation is the topmost Ordovician layer in Southern Ontario and is unconformably overlain by the Lower Silurian rocks of the Cataract Group. At its base it has a conformable gradational contact with underlying beds of the Georgian Bay Formation in Southern Ontario, the Carlsbad Formation near Ottawa, and the Oswego Formation in New York.

== Lithology ==
The formation is composed primarily of red and grey hematitic, sandy, calcareous and argillaceous shales with localized greenish banding. Colouration is connected to post-depositional processes: red portions are the result of oxidation of iron-bearing minerals and green comes from reduction, possibly by acidic groundwater. The formation also contains thin layers of calcareous sandstone, bioclastic, argillaceous and silty limestone, as well as calcareous sandstone. Coarser layers become much thicker in New York. Minor amounts of gypsum, in nodules and laminae, are found throughout. On the Manitoulin Island, the formation is dominated by limestone and dolomite.

=== Fossils ===
The formation is devoid of fossils in the uppermost shaly layers and is poorly fossiliferous throughout other parts, particularly, the bioclastic beds, where brachiopods, bryozoans, ostracodes, pelecypods, gastropods, tabulate corals and trilobites (Acernaspis) are found. Ichnofossils are more common, represented by Diplocraterion, Skolithos and Chondrites.

== Facies and depositional environments ==
Most of the sediments was deposited in the near-coastal semiarid setting with shallow, wide, muddy, prograding shore, affected by tides, frequent storms and fluctuating sea level of tectonic or, possibly, eustatic origin (Andean-Saharan glaciation). Prior to lithification, the mud deposits had been frequently exposed subaerially and desiccated, as evidenced by the numerous mudcracks, while evaporites (mostly, gypsum) were deposited in isolated pools. The formation is composed of 14 facies, grouped into 4 facies associations, named A through D, corresponding to the specific depositional environments.

Facies association A, composed mostly of dark grey shales, was deposited on a shelf, shallow enough to be affected by storms, that resulted in sandstone and bioclastic limestone layers. Facies association B was deposited under highly variable conditions, ranging from subtidal to intertidal to supratidal. It is defined by red and dark grey shales. Facies association C was deposited in the paralic setting and consists primarily of red shales. Facies association D, only found in New York, was deposited under fluvial conditions. It is dominated by sand, carried by braided rivers.

Similar depositional environments are currently found at the Gulf of California and the northwest shore of Australia.

== Economic significance ==
In New York, the formation's sandstone beds are commercially producing reservoir rocks for natural gas; the West Auburn Field has been productive since the 1940s. These beds are also currently considered for geological CO_{2} storage. In Ontario, shales of the formation have long been used by the ceramic industry, mainly for brick and tile production.
