= Juniata Formation =

Bedrock formation in the United States

- Stratigraphic range: Late Ordovician
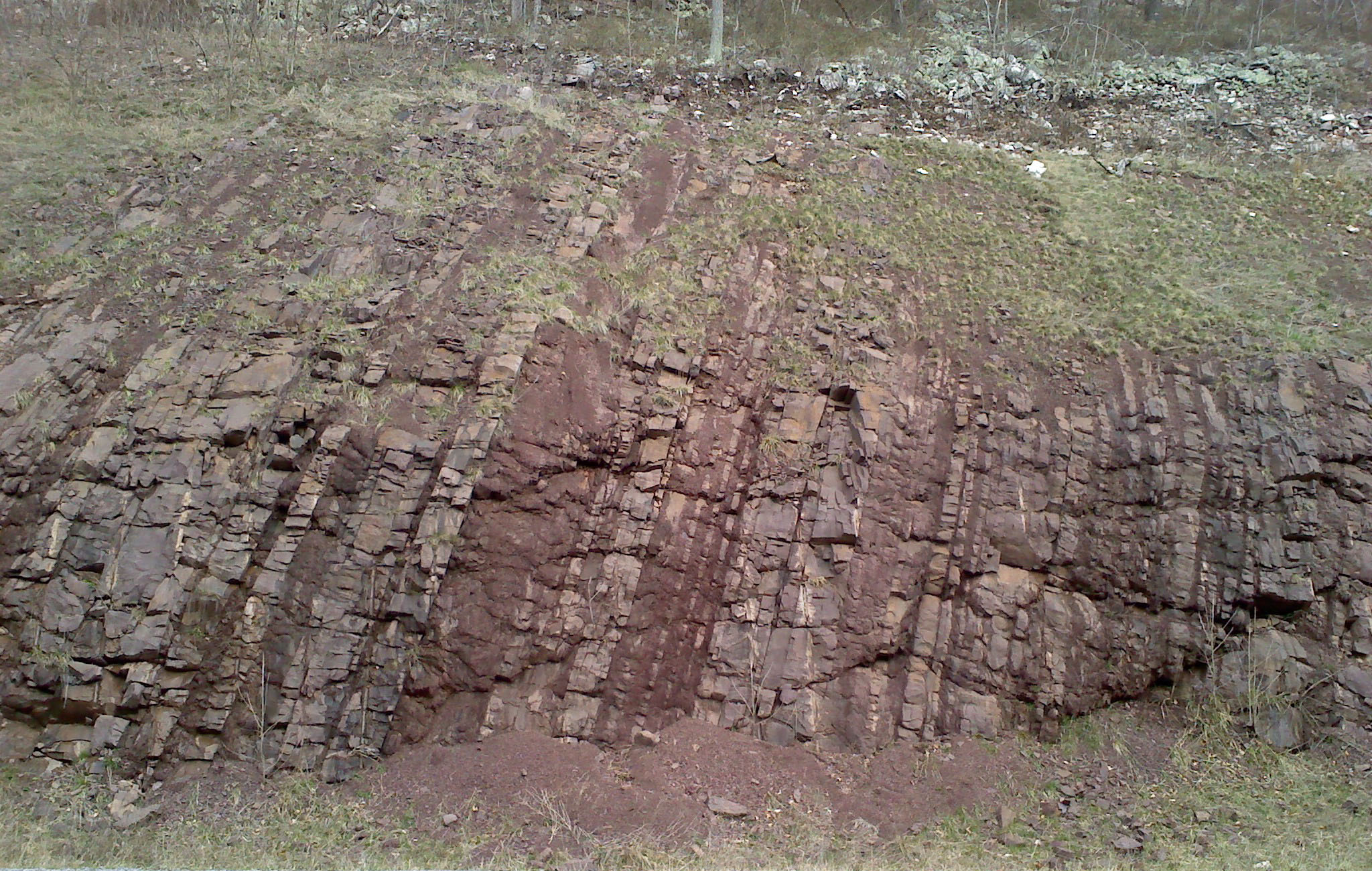
- Outcrop on U.S. Route 522 at Blacklog Narrows southeast of Orbisonia, Pennsylvania.
- Type: sedimentary
- Underlies: Oswego Formation and Tuscarora Formation
- Overlies: Bald Eagle Formation
- Thickness: 400–1,125 ft (122–343 m)

Lithology
- Primary: sandstone, siltstone, shale

Location
- Region: Appalachian Mountains
- Extent: Maryland, Pennsylvania, Tennessee, Virginia, and West Virginia

Type section
- Named for: Juniata River in Pennsylvania
- Named by: Darton and Taff

The Ordovician Juniata Formation is a mapped bedrock unit in Pennsylvania, West Virginia, Virginia, Tennessee, and Maryland. It is a relative slope-former occurring between the two prominent ridge-forming sandstone units: the Tuscarora Formation and the Bald Eagle Formation in the Appalachian Mountains.

== Description ==
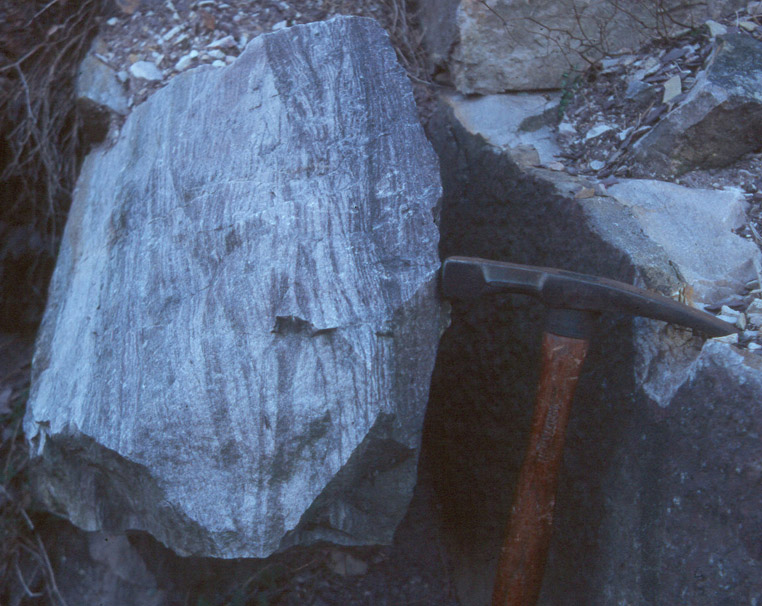
Conformable contact of overlying Tuscarora Formation (white rock, left) with underlying Juniata Formation (red rock, right) at the Narrows along rt. 30 in Bedford County, Pennsylvania.

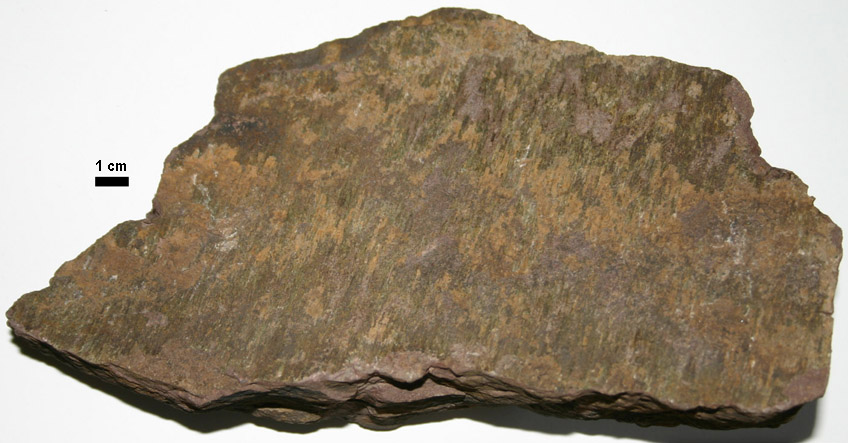
Sample from roadcut on U.S. Route 322 near State College, Pennsylvania, showing slickensides

The Juniata is defined as a grayish-red to greenish-gray, thin- to thick-bedded siltstone, shale, and very fine to medium-grained crossbedded sandstone or subgraywacke and protoquartzite with interbedded conglomerate. The Juniata is a lateral equivalent of the Queenston Shale in western Pennsylvania.

=== Depositional environment ===
The depositional environment of the Juniata has always been interpreted as mostly terrestrial or shallow marine deposits resulting in a molasse sequence produced by the Taconic orogeny.

=== Fossils ===
Very few fossils exist in the Juniata Formation, but different types of trace fossils such as tracks and burrows can commonly be found.

== Age ==
Relative age dating of the Juniata places it in the Upper Ordovician period, being deposited between 488.3 and 443.7 (±10) million years ago. It rests conformably atop the Bald Eagle Formation in Pennsylvania and the Martinsburg Formation in Maryland, and conformably below the Tuscarora Formation.

== Economic use ==
The Juniata is a good source of road material, riprap and building stone.

== See also ==
- Geology of Pennsylvania
