= Fodinichnia =

Trace fossil

Fodinichnia /ˌfɒdɪˈnɪkniə/ (singular fodinichnion) are trace fossils formed by deposit feeders as they excavate the sediment in search of food. They tend to have repeated patterns (e.g. Chondrites) or spreites (e.g. Rhizocorallium), the shape reflecting the systematic feeding strategy used by the organism as it scours the sediment. Deposit feeding often results in structures with no overlapping parts, as the deposit feeder optimises its nourishment intake by avoiding going over the same area more than once. This avoidance behavior is called phobotaxis.

The shape of fodinichnia can yield evidence of the depositional environment of the sediment in which they were made. For example, a trace with highly sinuous branches may reflect nutrient-poor conditions where the organism needed to ingest more sediment in order to acquire the same amount of nutriment that a straighter branch in a nutrient-rich environment would.

== See also ==
- Trace fossil
- Trace fossil classification
