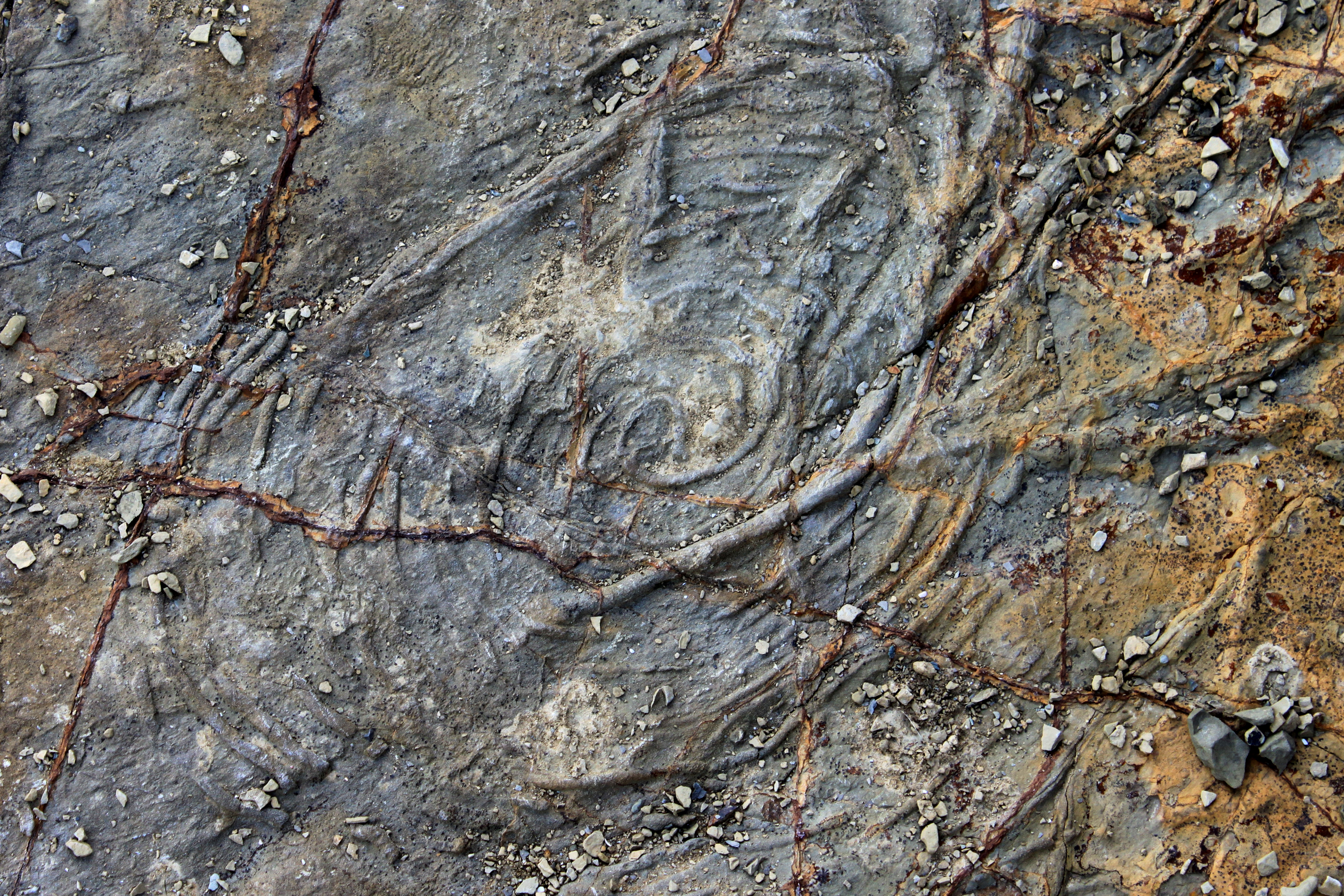
- Spiraling burrows

Trace fossil classification
- Ichnogenus: †Spirorhaphe; Fuchs, 1895

= Spirorhaphe =

Trace fossil

Spirorhaphe (sometimes misspelt Spiroraphe) is an ichnogenus of spiraling burrows. It is associated with the Nereites ichnofacies, which is interpreted as an indicator of deep-sea, pelagic, turbidity current-dominated systems. It is one of the most common graphoglyptid traces found in modern ocean beds.
