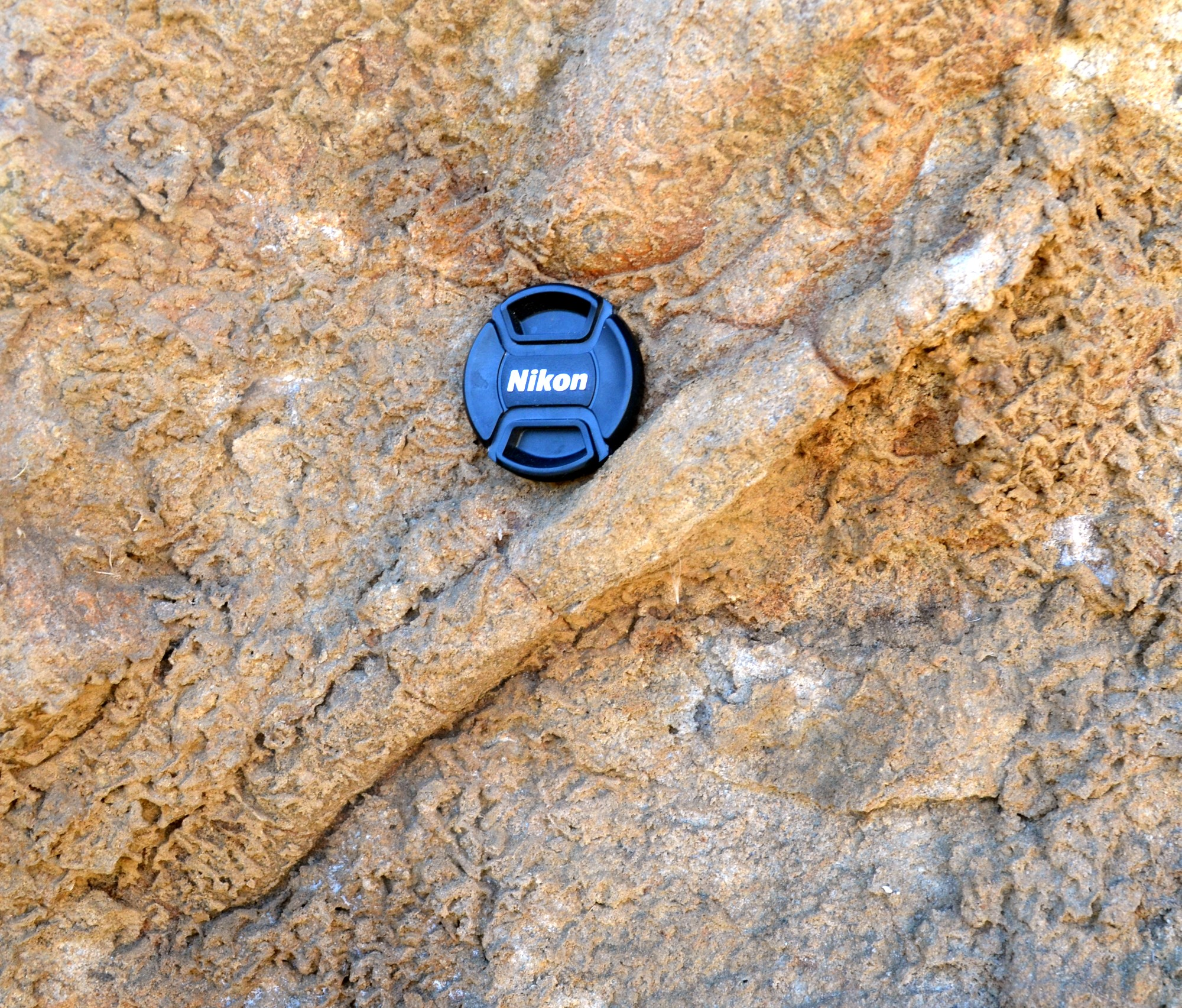
- Muensteria trace fossil from the Temblor Formation (Lower Miocene) of Kern County, California. Note the menisci (back-filling structures) in the burrow.

Trace fossil classification
- Kingdom: Animalia
- Phylum: Annelida
- Clade: Pleistoannelida
- Clade: Sedentaria
- Order: Sabellida
- Family: Sabellidae
- Ichnogenus: †Muensteria; Sternberg, 1833

= Muensteria =

Trace fossil

Muensteria is the ichnogenus of a type of trace fossil that is found in sedimentary rocks, and is thought to represent the horizontal burrow of a marine invertebrate organism. It is a horizontal, non-branching, unlined, tube-like burrow characterized by menisci, which are concave to flat laminae within the burrow created as the organism packs sediment and fecal material behind it when moving forward in the burrow. Muensteria is one example of a meniscate burrow.

== See also ==
- Trace fossil
- Ichnology
