= Cheltenham Badlands =

Badlands in Caledon, Ontario, Canada

Coordinates: 43°46′25″N 79°56′40″W

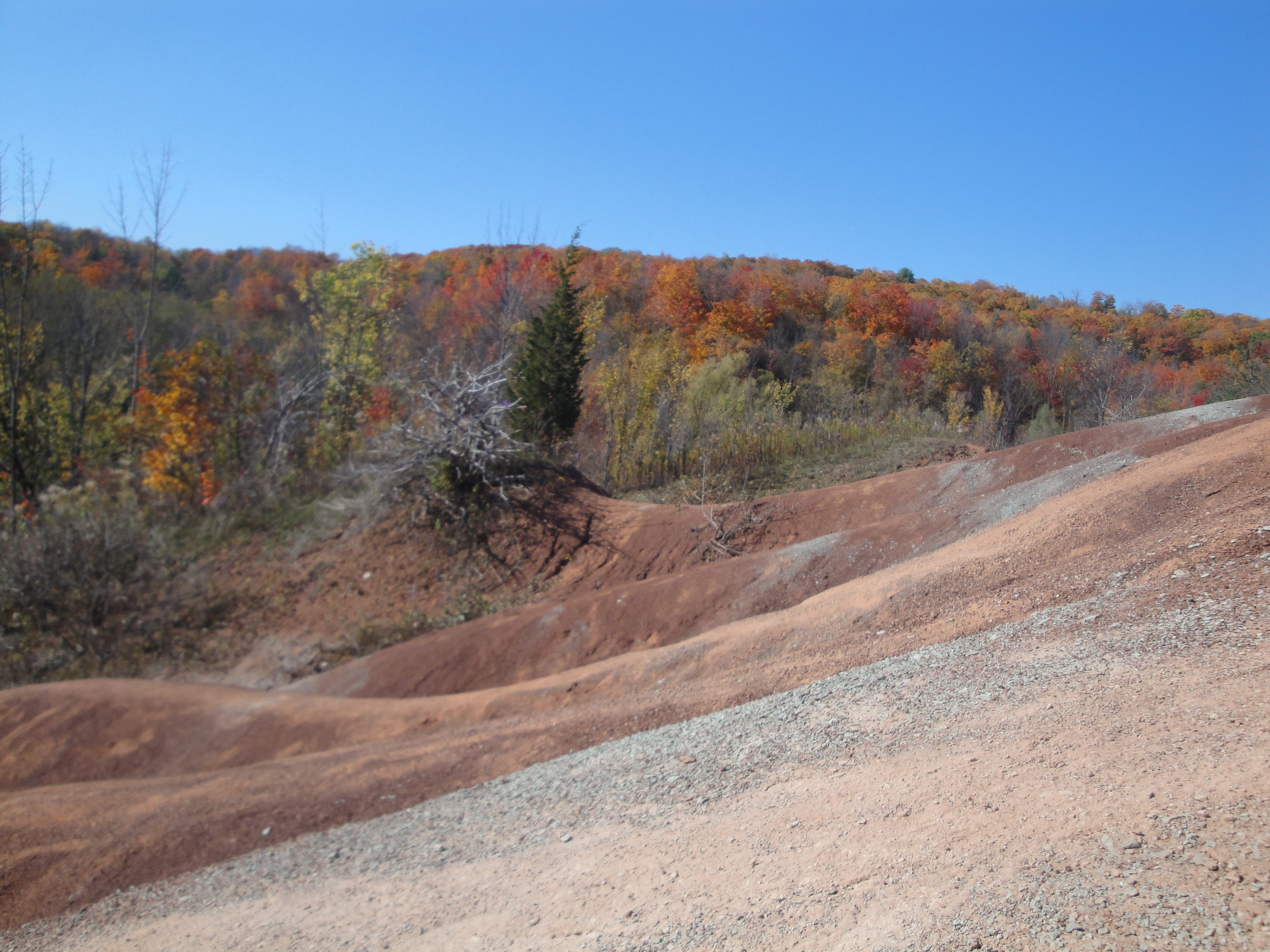
The badlands, from a road cut highlighting the different soil colours and terrain.

The Cheltenham Badlands are in Caledon, Ontario, on the southeast side of Olde Base Line Road, between Creditview and Chinguacousy Roads. The site occupies an area of approximately 0.4 square kilometers and features exposed and highly eroded Queenston shale. The Cheltenham Badlands are a significant educational site due to the readily visible geologic processes and the red colour and the unique topography of the exposed shale make this a popular tourist site. The site is a Provincial Earth Sciences Area of Natural and Scientific Interest (ANSI) since it is considered one of the best examples of "badlands topography" in Ontario.

== Background ==
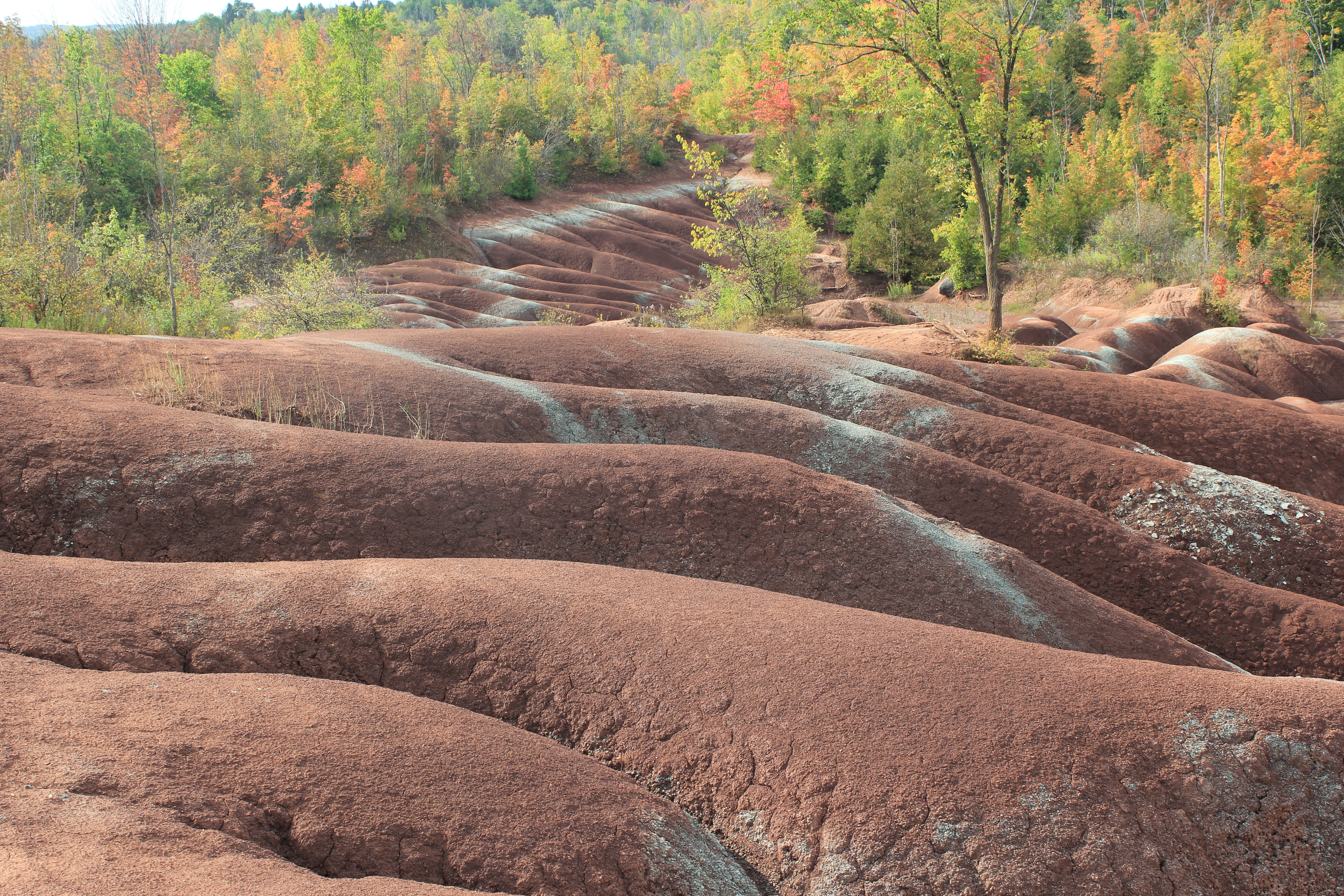
The Cheltenham Badlands looking south-west

The Cheltenham Badlands, sometimes referred to as the Chinguacousy Badlands, the Red Clay Hills, the Caledon Badlands, or the Inglewood Badlands, are approximately 3.8 km west of highway 10 on Olde Base Line Road near the villages of Inglewood and Cheltenham. The northern boundary of the badlands site is Peel Regional Road 12 (Olde Base Line Road). The total area of the property is 36.6 hectares and the exposed badlands occupies an area of approximately 0.4 square kilometers.

The Badlands are considered part of the Niagara Escarpment, which was designated a UNESCO World Biosphere Reserve in 1990. Acting as a buffer zone between the undeveloped and natural portions of the escarpment and the more developed areas further to the south, the badlands site is designated as an Escarpment Protection Area. Under the Niagara Escarpment Plan, the badlands are also considered an Escarpment Access Park and the main trail of the Bruce Trail system crosses the site and is the starting point for the Caledon Hills Bruce Trail Club section. In addition to being considered a Ministry of Natural Resources and Forestry designated Earth Sciences Area of Natural Scientific Interest, the Cheltenham Badlands are also part of an important groundwater discharge area, the Inglewood Slope Environmentally Sensitive Area, designated by the Credit Valley Conservation Authority. The cold water stream, at the base of the badlands, is a tributary of the Credit River, which drains into Lake Ontario.

== Geologic history ==
The Badlands is an exposed section of the Queenston Formation, which were created approximately 450 million years ago during the Middle and Late Ordovician periods. During this period, the collision of Gondwana into Laurentia resulted in the formation of the Taconic Mountains. The creation of these mountains also resulted in several basins, such as the Appalachian Basin and the Michigan Basin, in the interior of Laurentia. Over time, the erosion of these mountains resulted in the formation of the Queenston Delta, which drained into the Michigan Basin. The deposition of mud eroded from the mountains during the Middle and Late Ordovician period formed the Queenston Shale. The continuous deposition of the mud and sand from the mountains extended the Queenston Delta further into the Michigan Basin; however, as the mountains continued to erode, less and less mud and sand reached the delta, resulting in the formation of inter-layered beds of sandstone, shale and limestone throughout the Silurian period. These inter-layered beds that overlay the Queenston Shale include Lower Silurian sandstones, such as the Whirlpool Formation, and dolostones, such as the Manitoulin Formation, which can be seen along the Niagara Escarpment. The Queenston Shale overlies the shales and the inter-bedded limestones of the Georgian Bay Formation. At the badlands site, glacial erosion of the overlaying sandstones and dolostones has caused the Queenston Formation to be the first layer of rock to underlie the soil.

=== Queenston Formation ===
The Queenston Formation is characterized by its brick-red to maroon shales which are interlaced with smaller amounts of green shale, sandstone, and limestone. The darker red shale is the result of the introduction of the terrestrial muddy deposits into the Queenston Delta. The shale beds are thin and fractured, with a structural dip westward towards the centre of the Michigan Basin. Shales in the Queenston Formation are considered to have high density, low cation exchange capacities, and low water content. The lighter red shale, which sits on top of the darker shale, is highly bioturbated and is composed of a combination of bioclasts and the reworked pieces of the darker shale below. The rocks' distinct red colouring, which is due to iron oxide, is broken up by green-grey bands. The green-grey bands are thought to be caused by a change in the oxidation rate due to circulating groundwater or bleaching by acidic groundwater.

The lithology of the lighter and darker red shales at the Cheltenham Badlands site is categorized as smectite-poor, due to the clay content, ranging from 58% to 68% clay, and the dominant clay minerals, illite and chlorite. The non-swelling illite in the shales can cause high pressures with repeated wetting and drying, failing the shale structures. The difference in the water absorption between illite and chlorite clay minerals can cause differences in swelling which results in larger shards of the shales breaking into smaller shards. Once the shards are reduced to tiny and flaky shards, they become compacted and smooth; however, surface cracks during drying periods can lead to further erosion.

== Formation of the Badlands ==
=== Land use ===
In the late 1800s and early 1900s, the Cheltenham Badlands property was used for agricultural purposes, predominantly cattle grazing. Farming practices ceased on the property in 1931 and natural recovery of the majority of the property lands began. Once established, this type of erosion continues rapidly, particularly if land clearing, over-grazing, and increased foot traffic by humans persists, since the shale itself is highly susceptible to erosion. The main section of Badlands remains devoid of vegetation due to the high amount of human traffic during the warmer months; however, the less travelled areas, such as the area to the northwest, have more vegetation.

A section of the main Bruce Trail has been on the property since 1989 after permission for the trail was granted by the owner. A side trail, named the Russell Cooper side trail, connected the main trail to the unofficial viewing area located at the top of the site near Olde Base Line Road, and was open from 2001 to 2007. The side trail was closed due to concerns of erosion of the path and maintenance issues.

=== Geomorphological features ===
The Cheltenham Badlands presents a unique opportunity to observe the Queenston Formation and the effects of land degradation and denudation processes. The Badlands consist of predominantly red-coloured shale, which has been eroded into smooth-faced gullies and hills. The hummocky rills and gullies that dominate this area are formed by ephemeral streams that drain melt water and stormwater from the areas of higher elevation into the stream below. These rills and gullies are important geomorphological features in clay-rich badlands areas. Additionally, the clay near the surface expands and contracts, due to variations in moisture and in temperature, which leads to further erosion. From 1973 to 2009 the maximum degradation of the badlands site was found to be up to 3.2 metres and the average annual rates of denudation vary between 0.7 and 2.5 centimetres per year across the site. There is a high drainage density in this area, with three primary drainage areas. Slopes in the upper areas of the site are steeper than those near the lower areas of the site, primarily due to infilling from transported and deposited eroded material. The gullies in the site's lower parts have stabilized due to continued erosion and deposition of materials.

== Conservation ==
=== Ownership ===
The Cheltenham Badlands property was purchased in 1870 by George Wilson, who owned it until 1877. The next known owner of the property was Russell Cooper who purchased the property in 1929. The property was held by the Cooper family until 1989 when the family had indicated a desire to sell the property. The property was listed for acquisition through the Natural Areas Protection Program in 1999. The Cheltenham Badlands property was purchased for $500,000 by the Ontario Ministry of Natural Resources in 2000 and placed under the Niagara Escarpment Parks and Open Spaces System. Ownership of the property was transferred to the Ontario Heritage Trust in 2002. The Bruce Trail Conservancy and the Credit Valley Conservation Authority was made responsible for managing the site.

=== Badlands conservation ===
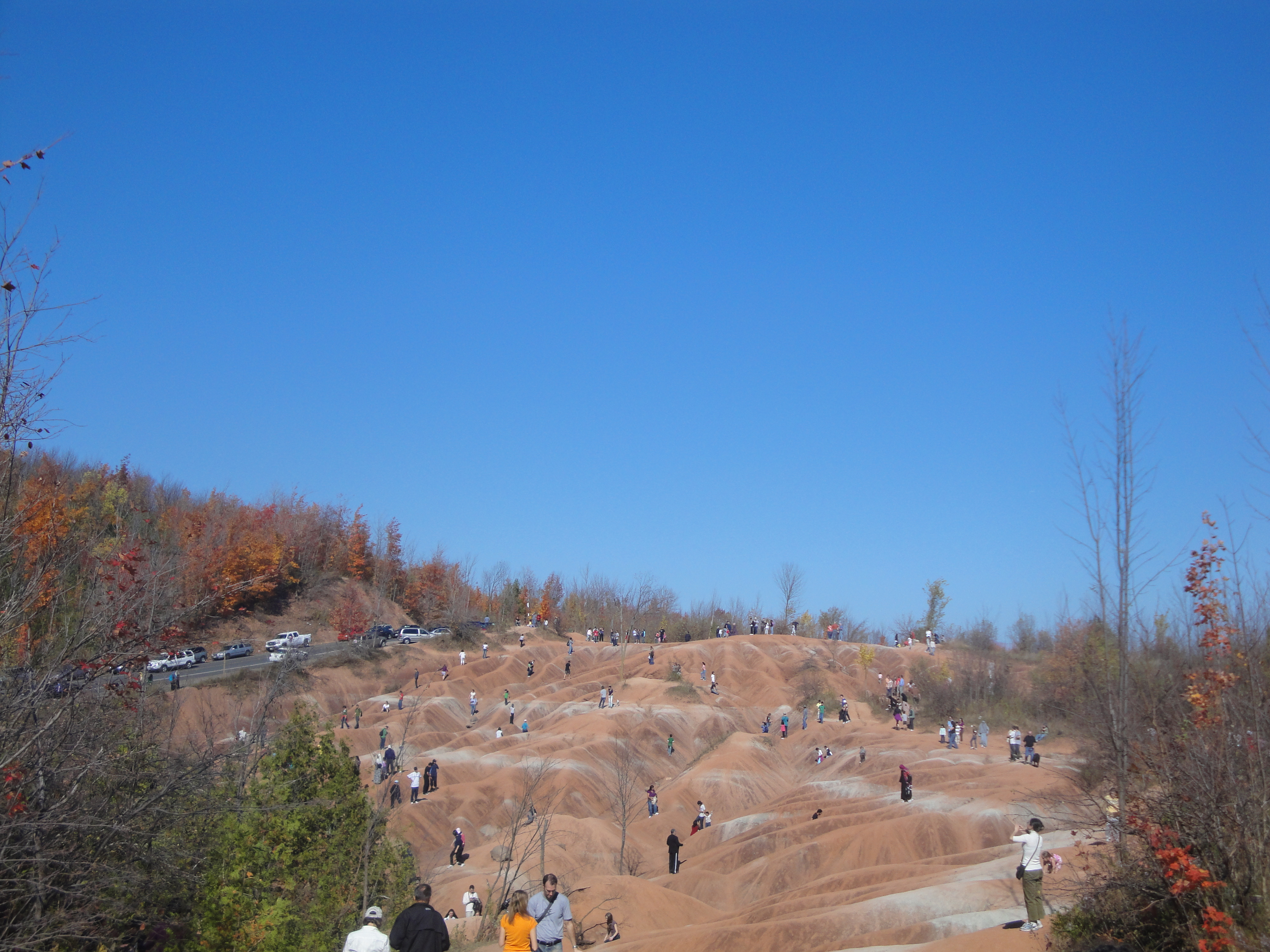
Tourists in 2010 on the slopes of the Cheltenham Badlands

As part of the management plan for the site, an erosion study of the badlands was conducted between 2009 and 2010 to provide an assessment of the erosion processes and rates at the site, as well as a framework for future monitoring. The erosion study provided two key findings that have directed the management of the site:

- Compression of the soil by foot traffic is not reducing erosion.
- Human foot traffic in the heavily visited site may account for up to 10% of the site area's annual sediment loss and denudation.

Some of the additional concerns about management of the site included:

- Concerns over public safety along the road beside the site, due to the number of cars parked alongside the road and the volume of visitors.
- Garbage and littering.
- Destruction of trail signs and structures.
- Creation of additional "rogue" trails on the property.
- Generalized impacts of pedestrian, equestrian, and wheeled traffic on the slopes of the badlands site.

On May 6, 2015, the Ontario Heritage Trust announced that the Badlands site would be closed to visitors for several years at the end of May, due to the excessive number of visitors who were walking on the formations, causing damage that accelerated the erosion. In July 2015 the Badlands were fenced off and closed to visitors; signs were erected marked "no trespassing", and the parking areas were changed to no-parking and tow-away zones. The closure was indicated as temporary as public consultation and a master plan study were underway. The area re-opened on September 22, 2018. The newly reopened site features an accessible boardwalk, a new trailhead, and way-finding signs, and a new parking area has been created to manage traffic concerns and provide safe public access to the site. Educational signs were also added to the site as part of the Visitor Infrastructure Improvement project, which began in 2017.

== See also ==
- Bruce Trail
- Niagara Escarpment
- Credit Valley Conservation
- Ontario Heritage Trust
