= Oswego Formation =

Geologic formation in West Virginia, United States

- Stratigraphic range: Late Ordovician
- Type: Formation
- Underlies: Tuscarora Sandstone
- Overlies: Juniata Formation

Location
- Region: Appalachia and Southeastern United States
- Country: United States
- Extent: Virginia and West Virginia

The Oswego Formation is a geologic formation in West Virginia. It dates back to the Ordovician period.
