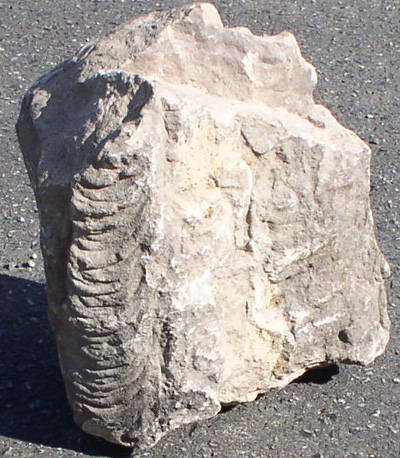
- Diplocraterion burrow (at left) from the Silurian-age Tuscarora Formation at Bald Eagle Mountain, Centre County, Pennsylvania. Specimen is ~22cm high.

Trace fossil classification
- Ichnogenus: Diplocraterion

= Diplocraterion =

Trace fossil

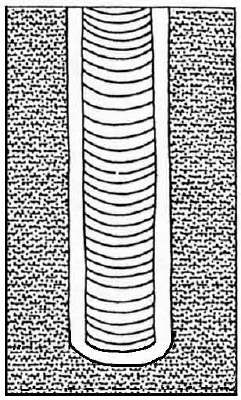
Sketch by Richter (1926) showing spreite in a Diplocraterion parallelum burrow.

Diplocraterion is an ichnogenus describing vertical U-shaped burrows having a spreite (weblike construction) between the two limbs of the U. The spreite of an individual Diplocraterion trace can be either protrusive (between the paired tubes) or retrusive (below the paired tubes). Some ichnospecies have both types (e.g., Diplocraterion yoyo). The presence/absence of funnel-shaped openings should not be used as an ichnotaxobase due to the high probability that the upper portions of the trace may have been eroded away. Observation of the orientation of Diplocraterion in the field is frequently used to determine the way up of rock strata at outcrop.

There are several ichnospecies of Diplocraterion.

Some Ichnospecies of Diplocraterion
Ichnospecies	Diagnosis
D. parallelum	Parallel burrow walls and unidirectional spreite
D. helmerseni	U-tubes expand laterally at the base
D. biclavatum	Arms of the U-tube extend below the curved base and form blind pouches
D. habichi	Arms of the U-tube diverge upward
D. polyupsilon	Bidirectional spreite that constrict upward
D. yoyo	U-tubes with both retrusive and protrusive spreiten

== Ethology ==
The various ichnospecies of Diplocraterion provide a good example of how ethology (animal-substrate interactions and behavior) can be interpreted from trace fossils. Diplocraterion is a classic example of equilibrichnia (equilibrium traces). These types of traces represent gradual adjustments to background sedimentation and erosion rates and reflect the efforts of the organisms to maintain a specific depth within the substrate. This movement within the substrate produces the two types of spreite (protrusive and retrusive) characteristic of Diplocraterion and other ichnotaxa (e.g., Rhizocorallium).

Most Diplocraterion show only protrusive spreit (e.g., D. parallelum, D. polyupsilon, D. biclavatum). These indicate that the trace was produced under predominantly erosive conditions where the organism was constantly burrowing deeper into the substrate as sediment was eroded from the top. D. yoyo has both protrusive and retrusive spreiten indicating highly variable conditions (erosional and depositional) leading to the need for the organisms to constantly adjust itself up and down within the substrate to maintain equilibrium and not become exposed or buried.

== See also ==
- Trace fossil
- Ichnology
