= Arenicolites =

Trace fossil

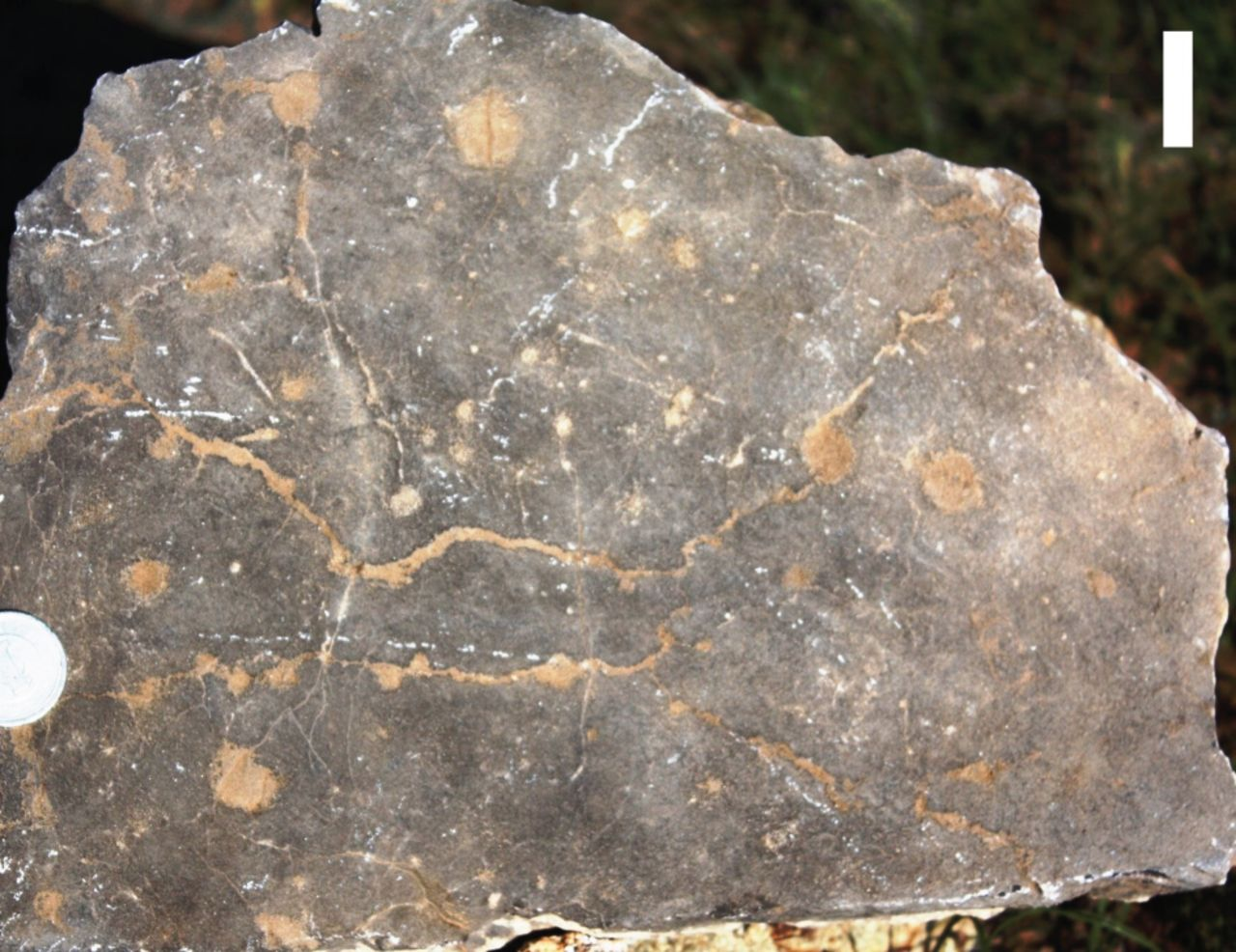
Trace fossils of Arenicolites in the bedding plane. Trace appears as pairs of circles. Scale bar=2 cm.

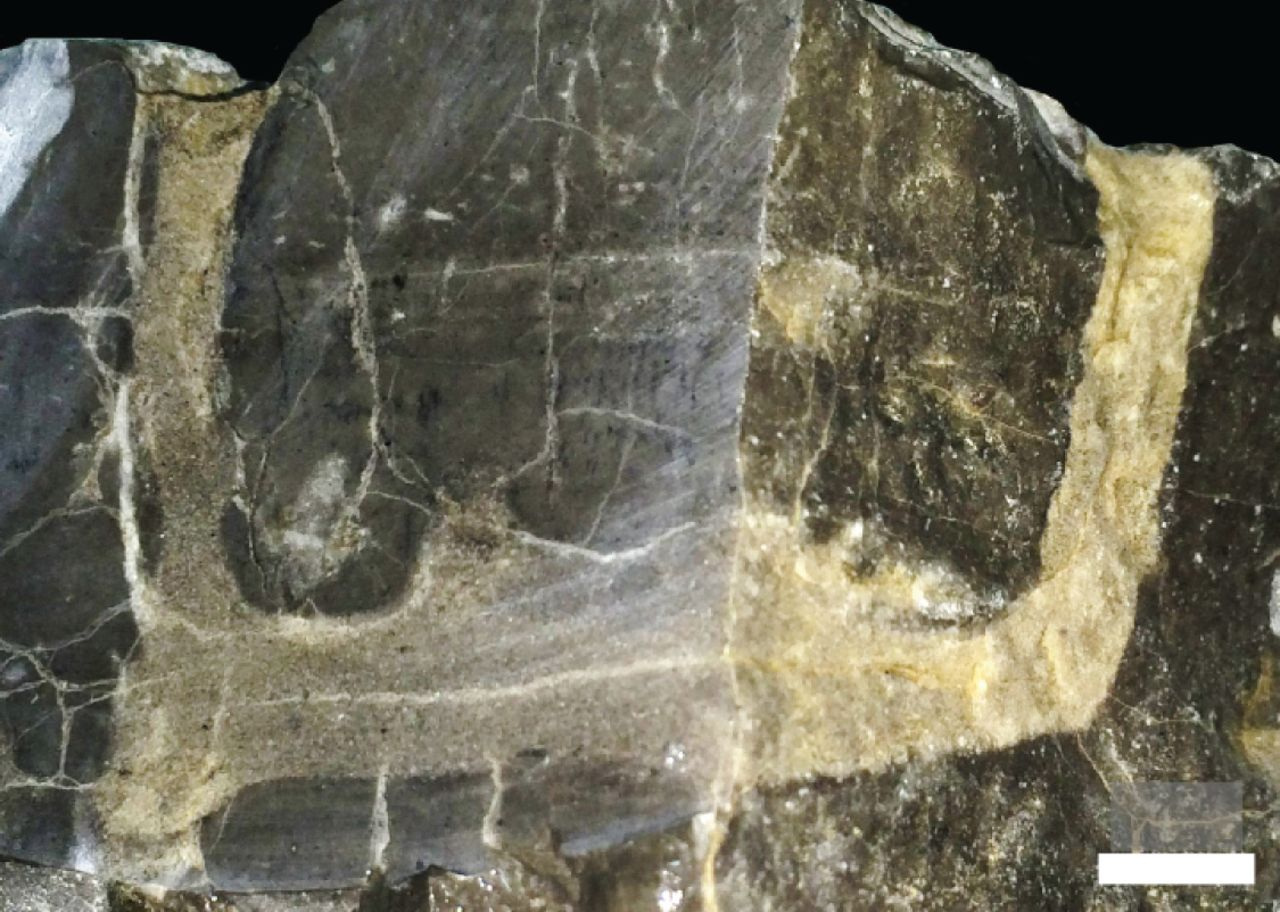
Arenicolites in vertical plane. The rock is cut with a rock saw with two oblique cuts. Scale bar = 1 cm.

Arenicolites is a U-shaped ichnotaxon (trace fossil) dating from Ediacaran times onwards in South Australia. The trace shown by this fossil, is a pair of closely spaced circles on a bedding plane. In vertical section the traces are U- or J-shaped. They appear to be burrows made by a kind of worm.
