= Phobotaxis =

Phobotaxis is a random behavioral response to all forms of aversive stimuli. A positive phobic response is one in which either activity is increased or the organism moves toward the stimulus, while a negative phobic response is when activity is decreased or the organism moves away from the stimulus. On the bacterial level, phobotaxis is regularly seen in accordance with phototaxis, random movement in response to light. In the protobacteria Rhodospirillum rubrum, the presence of ferric ion does not create a favorable wavelength of light for physiological activity. This elicits a positive photophobotactic response where the protobacteria moves towards blue and near-UV light. While the phobic response is classified as a photophobotactic response, the photochemical product of ferric complex in medium acts as a chemical stimulus, making this an example of chemotaxis as well. In the eukaryote Euglena, positive phototaxis and positive phobotaxis exhibit nearly the same action spectra, providing more evidence for their association. There also exists evidence to support photophobotaxis being coupled with electron transport needed in photosynthesis for two specific algaes: Phormidium uncinatum and Ph. autumnale. While there does not exist much evidence of phobotaxis in response to tactile stimuli, there is evidence to suggest species will respond in ways that will maximize necessary resources such as food. An experiment that simulated trail movements of trace fossils in the Ediacaran-Cambrian transition showed that those who engaged in phobotaxis, as in avoiding trails which indicate already exploited areas, gained more resources and had higher search efficiency. This foraging for resources involves changes in patchiness, which combines gravitaxis, movement in response to changes in gravity, and chemoreception to identify the spatial pattern of odors and move in response to chemical gradients.
