= Tuscarora Sandstone =

Bedrock unit in Pennsylvania, Maryland, West Virginia, and Virginia, US

Tuscarora Formation
- Stratigraphic range: Aeronian - Telychian
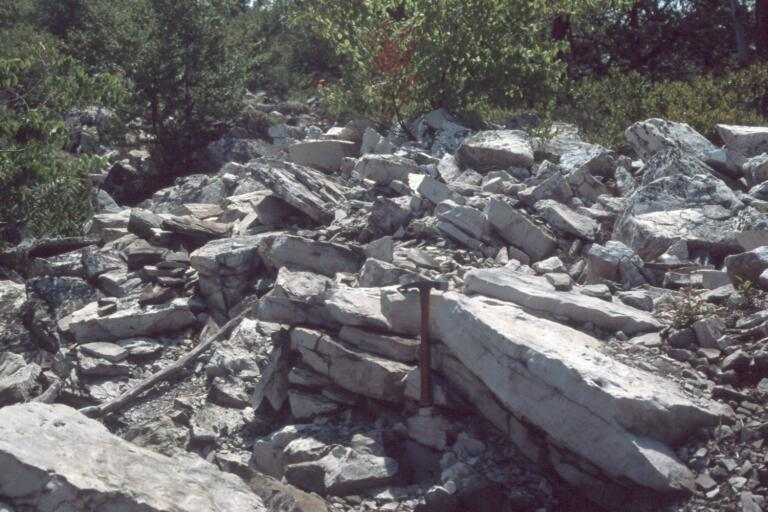
- Outcrop of Tuscarora Formation in Thickhead Wild Area, Centre County, Pennsylvania
- Type: sedimentary
- Sub-units: Castanea Member
- Underlies: Clinton Group
- Overlies: Juniata Formation

Lithology
- Primary: quartzarenite (sandstone)
- Other: conglomerate

Location
- Region: Appalachian Mountains
- Extent: Maryland, Pennsylvania, Virginia, and West Virginia

Type section
- Named for: Tuscarora Mountain
- Named by: Darton and Taff

The Silurian Tuscarora Formation — also known as Tuscarora Sandstone or Tuscarora Quartzite — is a mapped bedrock unit in Pennsylvania, Maryland, West Virginia, and Virginia, US.

== Description ==
The Tuscarora is a thin- to thick-bedded fine-grained to coarse-grained orthoquartzite. It is a white to medium-gray or gray-green subgraywacke, sandstone, siltstone and shale, cross-stratified and conglomeratic conglomerate in parts, containing a few shale interbeds.

Details of the type locality and of stratigraphic nomenclature for this unit as used by the U.S. Geological Survey are available on-line at the National Geologic Map Database.

The Tuscarora and its lateral equivalents are the primary ridge-formers of the Ridge-and-Valley Appalachians in the eastern United States It is typically 935 feet thick in Pennsylvania, and in Maryland varies from 60 feet to 400 feet thick from east to west.

=== Notable exposures ===
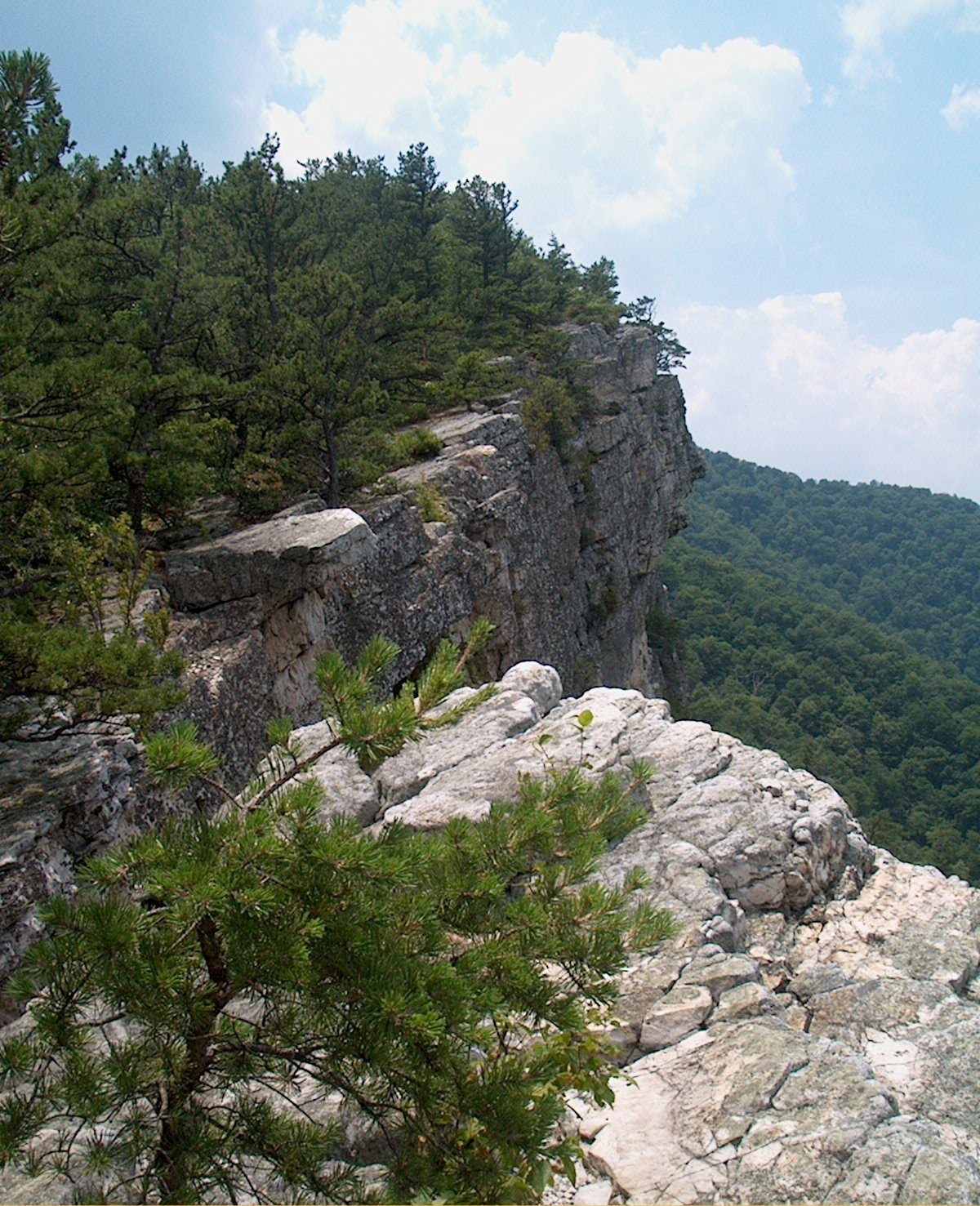
Tuscarora quartzite cliff on the west side of North Fork Mountain in West Virginia.

The Tuscarora Formation is commonly exposed on various ridge crests and in many water gaps in the Ridge and Valley physiographic province of the Appalachians of Pennsylvania, Maryland, and West Virginia, particularly along the Wills Mountain Anticline.

In Pennsylvania, the Tuscarora is exposed along US 30 on the north and south sides of the Narrows in central Bedford County, where it is nearly vertical. It is also well-exposed in the core of Jack's Mountain in Jack's Narrows, where the Juniata River cuts through the mountain, just west of Mount Union. The Standing Stone Trail traverses this cut, and many of the "Thousand Steps" here are Tuscarora quartzite.

In Maryland, the National Road (US 40) passes arched Tuscarora sandstone outcrops in the Cumberland Narrows in Allegany County.

In West Virginia, the River Knobs along the North Fork of the South Branch of the Potomac River in Pendleton County include dramatic outcrops of nearly vertical Tuscarora sandstone. Some of the better known of these exposures are Seneca Rocks, Champe Rocks, Judy Rocks, and Nelson Rocks. These cliffs are clearly visible along U.S. Route 33 and West Virginia Routes 28 and 55. North Fork Mountain, to the east of the River Knobs, is a long Ridge and Valley anticline ridge capped by Tuscarora sandstone.

Two of the more comprehensive exposures of the Tuscarora Formation are in two quarries at the crest and south end of Canoe Mountain (Spruce Creek Quadrangle).

== Geographic Extent ==
The Tuscarora is present in Pennsylvania, Maryland, West Virginia, and Virginia, US.

== Stratigraphic Setting ==
The Tuscarora rests conformably atop the Juniata Formation and conformably below the Clinton Group in Pennsylvania.

The Tuscarora is a lateral equivalent of the Minsi and Weiders members of the Shawangunk Formation in eastern Pennsylvania, New Jersey, and New York, and of the Massanutten Formation in Virginia, and the Clinch Sandstone farther south. Butts (1940) indicated that in the Appalachian Valley and Ridge Province the name "Tuscarora Sandstone" should be applied to these strata from Pennsylvania in the north to 38deg N latitude, and that the name "Clinch Sandstone" should be applied to these strata south of 38deg N latitude.

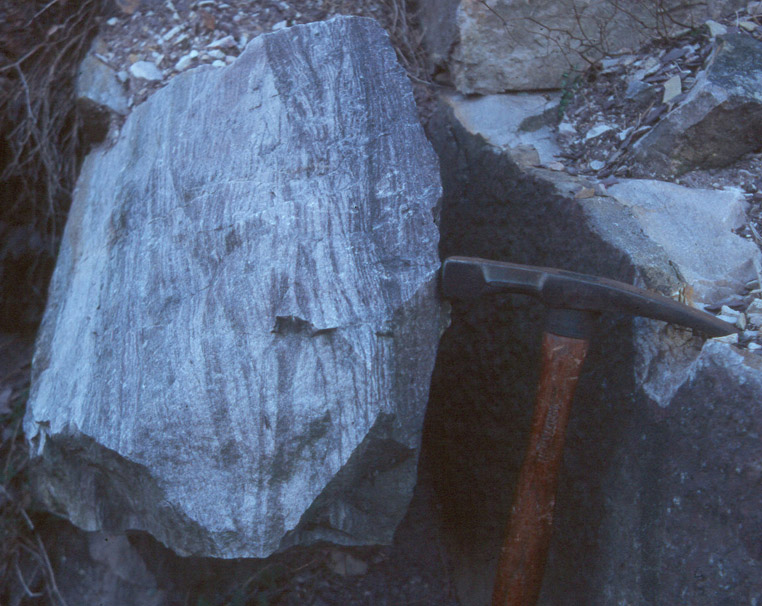
Conformable contact of overlying Tuscarora Formation (white rock, left) with underlying Juniata Formation (red rock, right) at the Narrows along U.S. 30 in Bedford County, Pennsylvania.

There is one named member of the formation: Castanea, occurring at the top, leaving the Lower and Middle Tuscarora Formation at the bottom. This formation has been called the "White Medina Sandstone" in West Virginia.

== Fossils ==
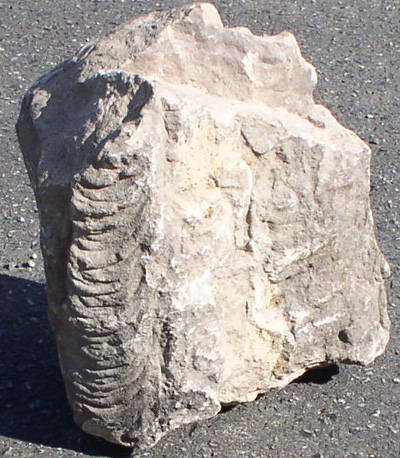
Sample of Silurian Tuscarora Formation collected from Bald Eagle Mountain, Centre County, Pennsylvania, showing Diplocraterion trace fossil at left. Specimen is ~22cm high.

Very few fossils exist in the Tuscarora, and most of them are trace fossils.

At least two hughmilleriid Eurypterids (sea scorpions) have been discovered in the Tuscarora.

== Age ==
Relative age dating of the Tuscarora places it in the Lower Silurian period, being deposited between 440 and 417 (±10) million years ago.

== Interpretations of Depositional Environment ==
The depositional environment of the Tuscarora has always been interpreted as mostly terrestrial or shallow marine deposits resulting in a molasse sequence produced by the Taconic orogeny. It is thought to represent a vast sand shoal along the margin of the Iapetus Ocean.

Ripple marks are seldom found, but do support interpretation as a shallow marine depositional environment.

== Economic uses ==
The Tuscarora may have been used as a ganister for making furnace liners in 19th century iron smelting blast furnaces of central Pennsylvania.

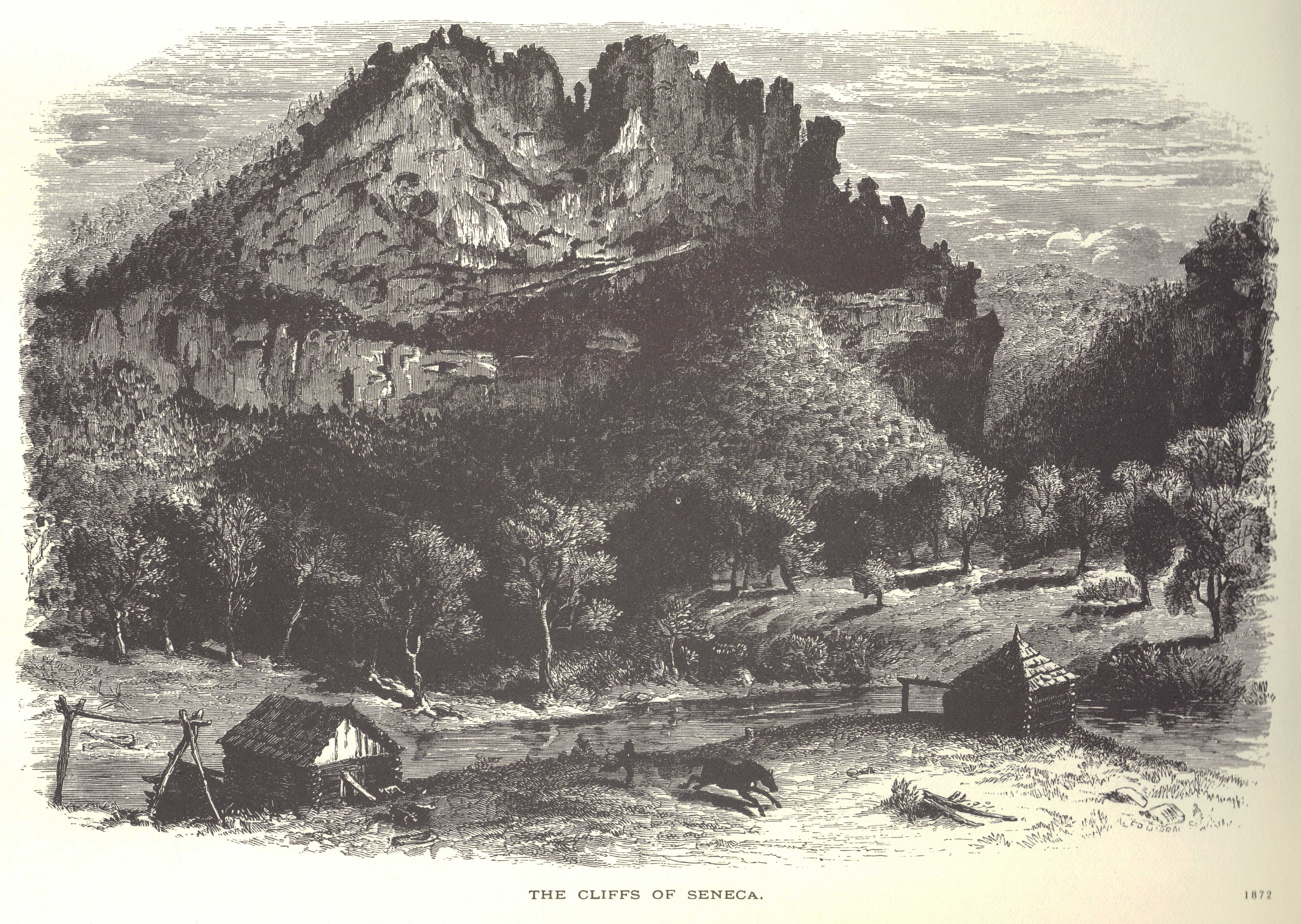
Seneca Rocks, a dramatic Tuscarora sandstone outcrop in West Virginia (Wood engraving by David H.Strother, 1872)

The Tuscarora has become very important to the tourism industry of eastern West Virginia, where the formation has many conspicuous outcrops visible from such roads as U.S. Routes 33 and 50 and West Virginia Routes 28 and 55. Tuscarora-capped North Fork Mountain and various Tuscarora cliffs are prominent in scenic views from such sites as Spruce Knob and Dolly Sods.

Seneca Rocks in Pendleton County, West Virginia, has become a world-renowned rock climbing location. It is the only "true peak" (a peak inaccessible except by technical rock climbing techniques) on the East Coast of the United States. Two climbing schools near the outcrop and many other guide services offer guided climbing trips on the 300+ climbing routes on the west-facing cliff. Seneca Rocks is managed by the U.S. Forest Service, and is located within the Spruce Knob–Seneca Rocks National Recreation Area of the Monongahela National Forest.

The Nelson Rocks Preserve, located near Circleville, West Virginia, is a privately owned and operated nature preserve dedicated to preserving Nelson Rocks and the surrounding environment as a cultural, educational, and recreational resource. The preserve offers a via ferrata climbing trail, one of six in the United States.

== See also ==
- Big Mountain (Pennsylvania)
- Bald Eagle Mountain
- Brush Mountain
- Germany Valley
- Geology of Pennsylvania
- Massanutten Mountain
- Mount Nittany
- North Fork Mountain
- Tussey Mountain
- River Knobs (West Virginia)
- Seneca Rocks
- Champe Rocks
- Nelson Rocks
