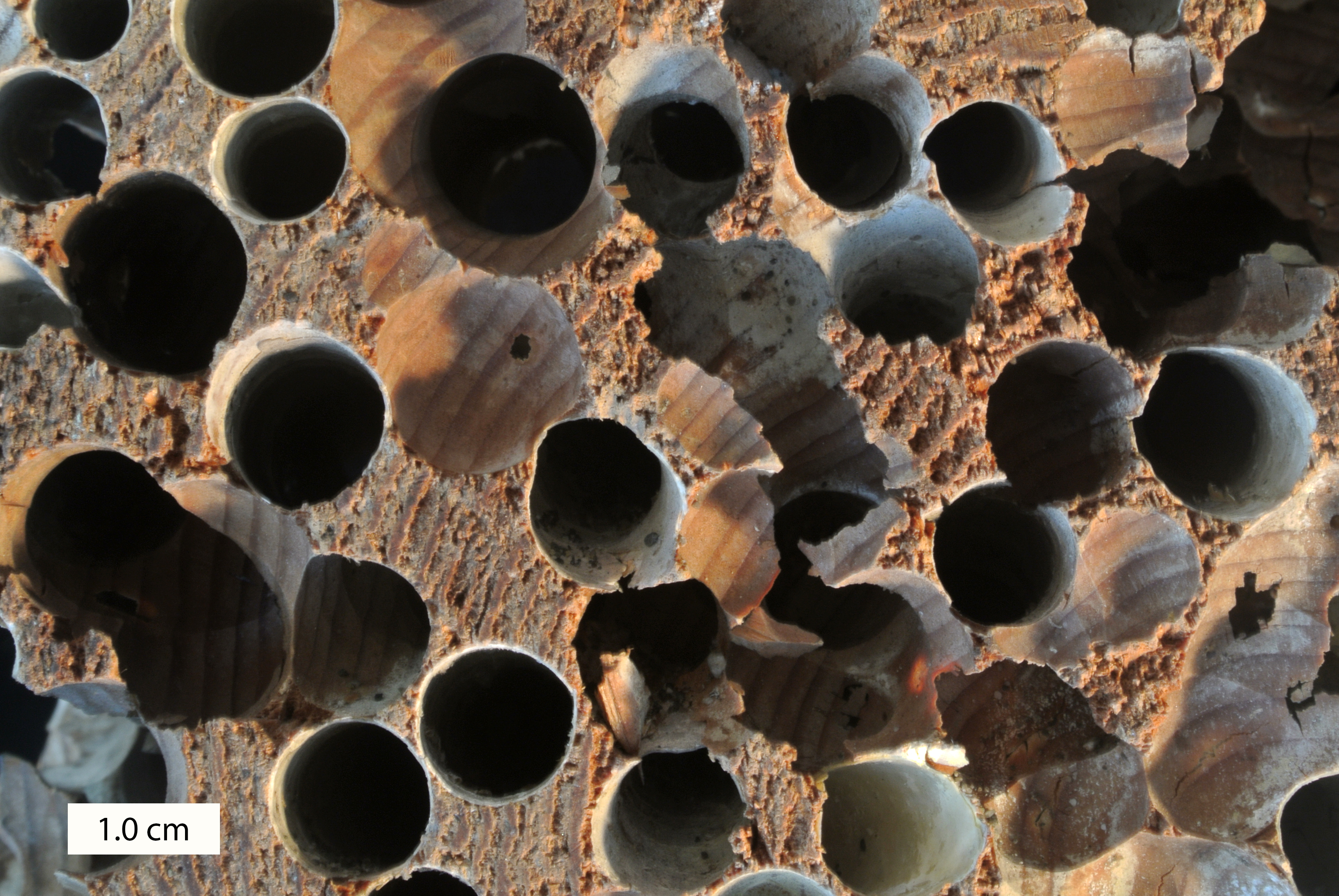
- Teredolites; an ichnogenus formed by boring bivalves in wood.

Trace fossil classification
- Ichnofamily: †Gastrochaenolitidae
- Ichnogenus: †Teredolites; Leymerie, 1842

Type ichnospecies
- Teredolites clavatus Leymerie, 1842

Synonyms
- Ichnogenus: Martesites Vitális, 1960; Palaeoclavaria Poinar & Brown, 2003; Ichnospecies: Martesites vadaszi Vitális, 1961; Palaeoclavaria burmitis Poinar & Brown, 2003

= Teredolites =

Trace fossil

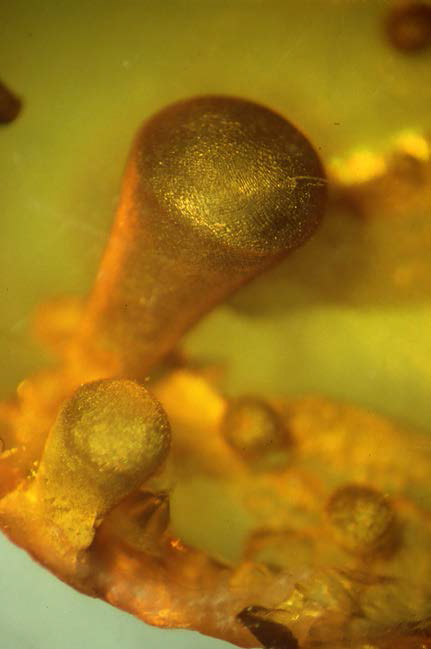
Teredolites clavatus in Burmese amber

Teredolites is an ichnogenus of trace fossil, characterized by borings in substrates such as wood or amber.

Club-shaped structures rimming mid-Cretaceous Burmese amber were formerly identified as the fungal sporocarps Palaeoclavaria burmitis. A 2018 study re-identified the structures as domichnia (crypts) bored in the amber nodules by bivalves of the pholadid subfamily Martesiinae. The borings are comparable with Teredolites clavatus and Gastrochaenolites lapidicus . Due to the substrate of the Myanmar borings being amber, the term 'amberground' was coined.

== See also ==
- Ichnology
