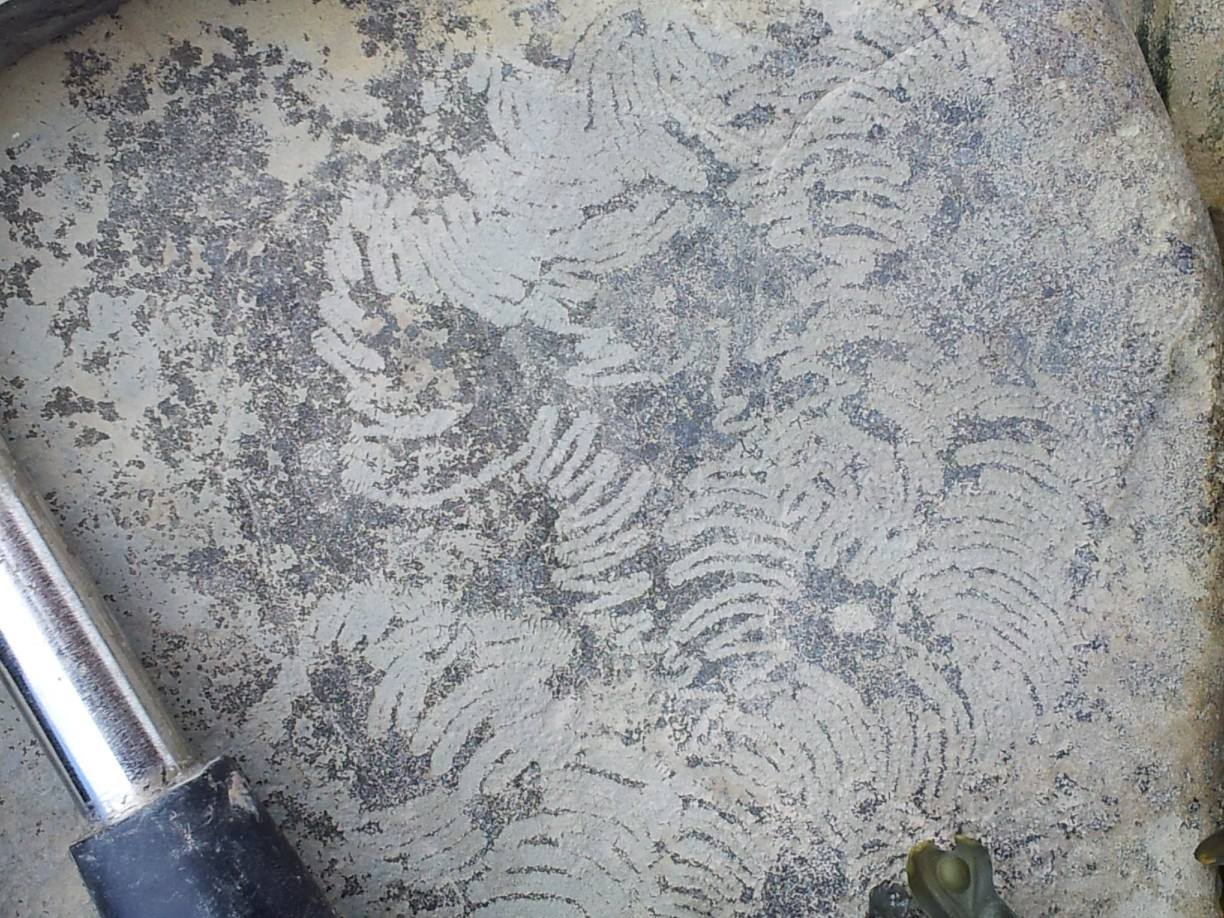
- Nereites irregularis

Trace fossil classification
- Ichnogenus: Nereites; McLeay, 1839

= Nereites =

Nereites Temporal range: Tertiary (perhaps earlier, references needed)

Trace fossil

Nereites is an ichnogenus of trace fossil. Modern tracemakers of incipient Nereites include worm-like organisms, horseshoe crabs and hermit crabs. Historically, two models have been proposed for Nereites:

1. in the ‘worm model’, Nereites is a feeding burrow produced by wormlike organisms, probing and backfilling laterally
2. in the ‘arthropod model’, the characteristic lobes are pressure-release structures made by arthropod legs. According to this interpretation, Nereites is a locomotion trail

== Nereites irregularis ==
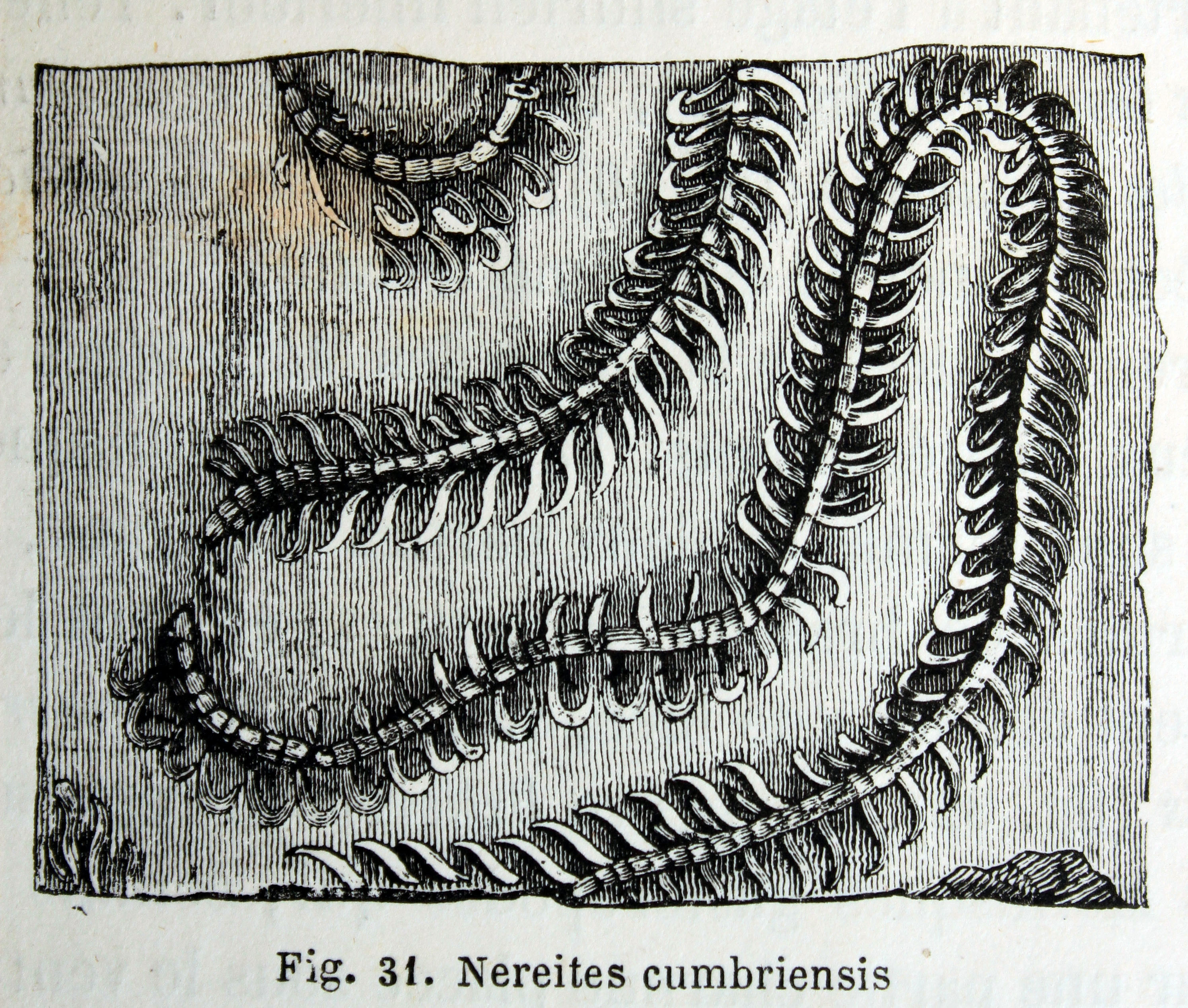
N. cumbriensis

The ichnogenus Nereites includes Nereites irregularis (formerly Helminthoida labyrinthica and Helminthoida crassa). They are relatively small Nereites characterized by large numbers of closely packed deeply meandering trails that tend to coil. The trails are usually horizontal and may be regular to irregular in guidance. The central tunnel is usually thicker than the envelope zone. In dense meanders, the envelope zone may touch or overlap, but it displays low-amplitude lobes in looser meanders.

Nereites irregularis has not been matched with known modern organisms, but they are generally believed to have been grazing trails (pascichnia) made by worms.

== Nereites biserialis ==
Nereites biserialis comprises winding trails constituted by a furrow flanked on both sides by lobes. Incipient biseriate Nereites are produced by hermit crabs occupying oblong shells (i.e. Cerithium).

== Nereites uniserialis ==
Nereites uniserialis comprises winding trails consisting of a furrow flanked by a single row of lobes. In contrast to the roughly symmetric Nereites biserialis, Nereites uniserialis is produced by hermit crabs occupying trochiform shells.
