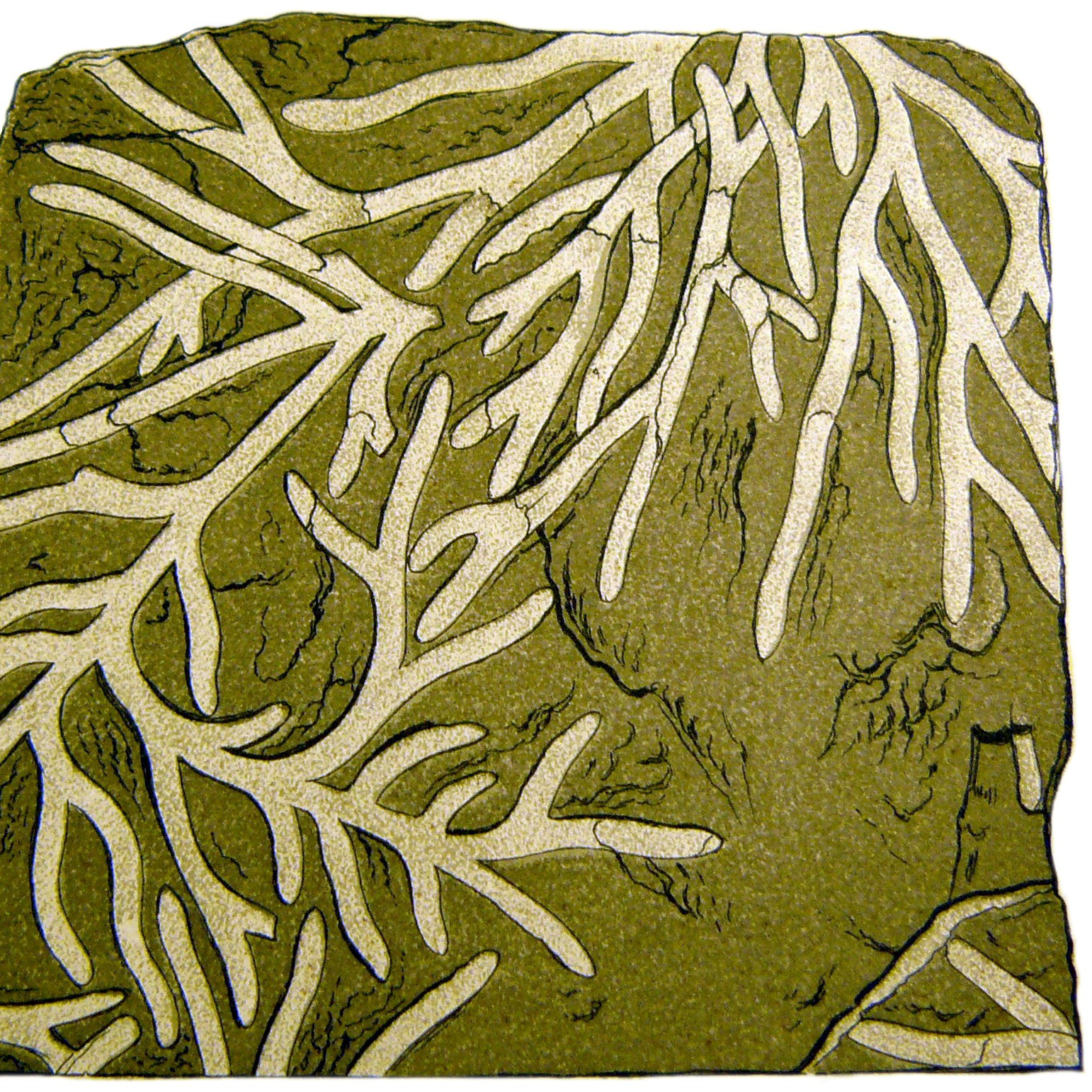
- Illustration of Chondrites bollensis.
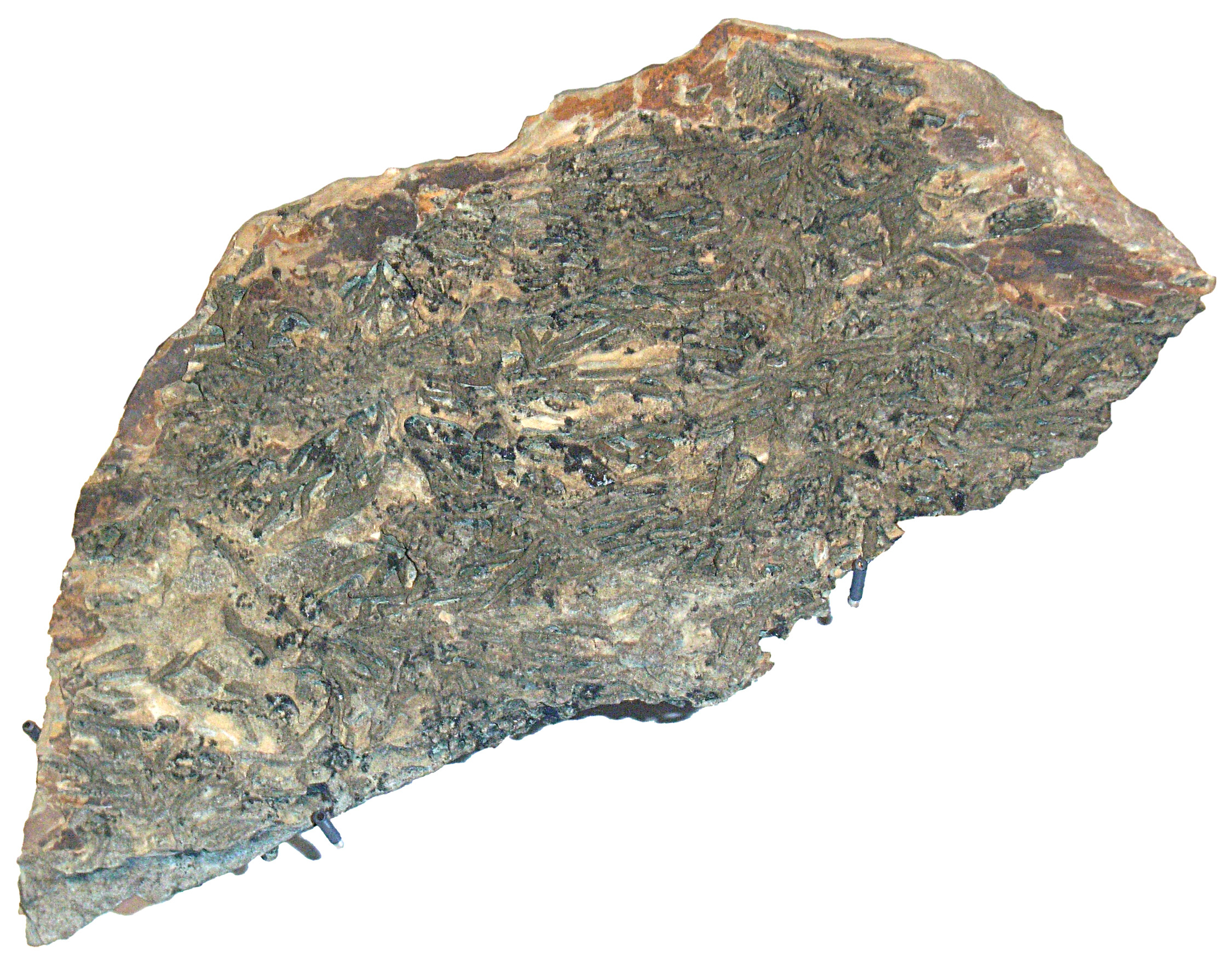
- A sample of Chondrites from the Middle Silurian.

Trace fossil classification
- Ichnogenus: †Chondrites; Sternberg, 1833

= Chondrites (genus) =

Chondrites Temporal range: Cambrian to Recent

Trace fossil

Chondrites is a trace fossil ichnogenus, preserved as small branching burrows of the same diameter that superficially resemble the roots of a plant. The origin of these structures is currently unknown. Chondrites is found in marine sediments from the Cambrian period of the Paleozoic onwards. It is especially common in sediments that were deposited in reduced-oxygen environments.

== Morphology ==
There are four recognized Chondrites ichnospecies, however, aberrant forms of unknown taxonomic affinity have been discovered. The fossils are made of infilled dendritic rootlike burrows. The branching angles are 30° to 40°, while a shaft diameter varies between 0.1 mm and 10 mm, remaining constant within a single system. Chondrites is classified as a fodinichnion.

== Occurrence ==
First appearing during the Cambrian, Chondrites is still produced today. It is one of the most common ichnotaxa throughout the fossil record and is widely distributed in all types of marine sedimentary rocks, including sandstone, shale, limestone and marl that formed in environments ranging from subtidal shelves to the abyssal zone. The maker of the traces has been able to tolerate highly variable redox conditions. For example, Chondrites is abundant almost to the exclusion of other ichnogenera in Posidonia Shale, formed from laminated, black, carbonaceous clay, deposited in an anoxic, reducing environment. In the oxic, extensively bioturbated units of Austin Chalk, the fossil is very common as well.

== Interpretation ==
Though the characteristic burrows are still produced today (in deep-sea deposits), no organism has ever been observed inside them. Several theories exist regarding the origin of these structures. While some authors hypothesize Chondrites to be the product of an infaunal abyssal nematode, others propose it to be formed by a chemosymbiotic organism, pumping methane and hydrogen sulfide from the sediments. Another study suggests it to be a fecal storage structure.

The ichnogenus is found both in anaerobic, organic-rich sediments and in oxic layers, where it is almost invariably the last in the bioturbation sequence, i.e., it was placed deep within the sediments, away from oxidizing surficial and interstitial water. These suggest the trace-maker's ability to tolerate oxygen deprivation very well. Therefore, Chondrites can be used as an indicator of anoxia in sediments.
