= Bioclast =

Skeletal fossil fragments

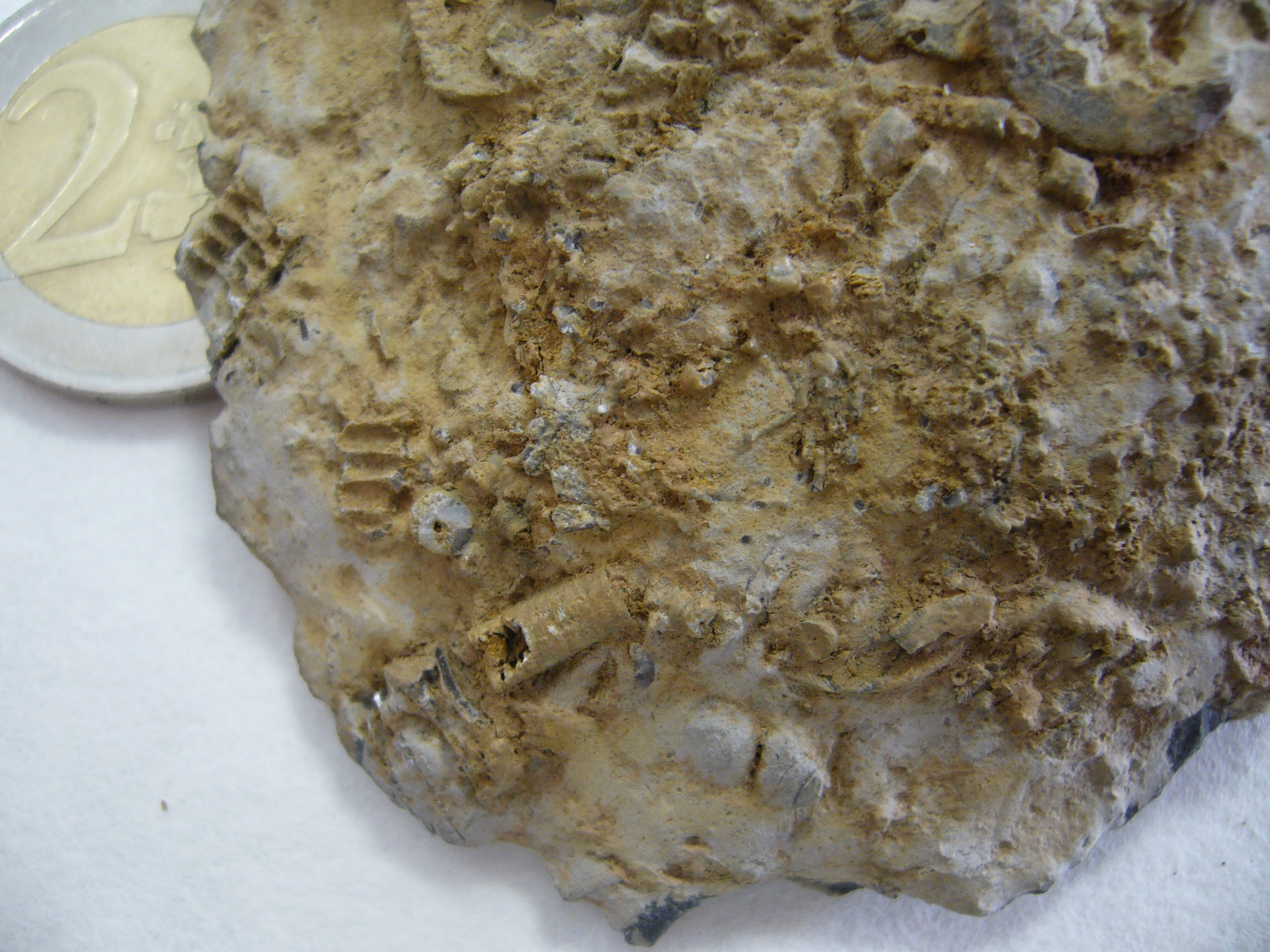
Limestone of crinoids

Bioclasts are skeletal fossil fragments of once living marine or land organisms that are found in sedimentary rocks laid down in a marine environment—especially limestone varieties around the globe, some of which take on distinct textures and coloration from their predominant bioclasts—that geologists, archaeologists and paleontologists use to date a rock strata to a particular geological era.

In geology bioclasts are used for such things relative dating purposes can be whole fossils or broken fragments of organisms. Their preponderance can give a rough guide to life diversity in the historic biosphere, but absolute counts much depend on water conditions such as the depth of the deposition, local currents, as well as wave strength in large body of water such as lakes. They can be used to study the age of the formation environment of the rocks that bioclasts finds itself in. one of the major contributions of bioclasts is that they form in regions where organisms lived and eventually died, over time. This is important because with the right conditions (pressure and temperature) there is a high possibility for hydrocarbon potential. This is because hydrocarbons will eventually form due to the rich organic matter that has died and enriches the sediments. A vast chunk of the fossil records during the Metazoan era were all bioclasts of cloudina shells.

== Cloudina ==
The cloudina shells make their shell beds when they are filled into depressions that occur between thrombolitic domes and occasionally form in troughs between low amplitude current ripples that occur in grainstone facies. These organisms have the best potential index fossil in the Late Ediacaran era. It has been determined that these organisms used to grow from a basally closed funnel. It would be also possible to see dichotomous branching off their vertical edges. They were once found in areas where the difference in water depths and transport in oceans is the major factors controlling the regions richness in a certain species. The areas of higher richness are found in medium to very fine sand and muddy bottoms with the bioclasts being at the shallowest stations.

Studies of bioclasts in the fossil record revealed three main cloudina morphology types:

- In most scenarios, the organisms' basal end has a hemispherical shape but it shows no signs of attachment scars or anchoring and support structures. Basal end can range from 1 to 1.5 mm in diameter and 0.2 to 2 mm in length.
- Tubes with a point, closed basal base. The length of this point can range from 0.05 to more than 1 mm. Its maximum diameter lies between 0.25 and 0.3 mm.
- The basal element seems to be crushed or flattened. This is somewhat like the point morphology but it is blunter. The maximum diameter of the blunt basal varies from 0.15 to 0.35 mm, while its max length is 0.6 mm.

There are some regions in the world where it is capable to actually see shells (bioclasts) of once living organisms within a geological structure called lenticular bedding. These beds are considerably thin, being only a few centimeters thick which are densely packed, poorly sorted. The shells are also randomly oriented and are recrystallized. By these characteristics it shows that the fragments have not been reworked long term, and have instead been reworked shortly after the death of the organism and was eventually deposited close to where they once lived. An area where you are able to see ancient sediments and rocks that have bioclast components dominating their matrix is a valley that once connected the Miocene Sommières Basin in southern France to the Mediterranean Sea. At this location the sediments are made of carbonate grains that have formed in the temperate factories. These grains have a wide variety in composition; they can be barnacles, bryozoans, coralline algae and echinoids among others.

When bioclasts are in their rock formation, meaning that they have gone through all the stages that sediments go through to reach its final phase, a whole rock unit, it is accompanied and mixed with variable amount of terrigenous material, glauconite particles and also phosphate grains. Studies done with the help of plane polarized light of several different rock formations showing the kinds of bioclastic mixtures that were found in this basin. In one rock unit there were barnacles, bryozoans, echinoid calcarenite, while in other rocks bryozoan-mollusk calcarenite and coralline algae were found. All of the rocks and bioclasts studied in this region are from the middle to upper Pliocene and have been exposed. These deposits allow the analysis of the architecture and internal complexities of a mixed bioclastic-silicicastic succession in a thrust-belt.

== Limestone rocks ==
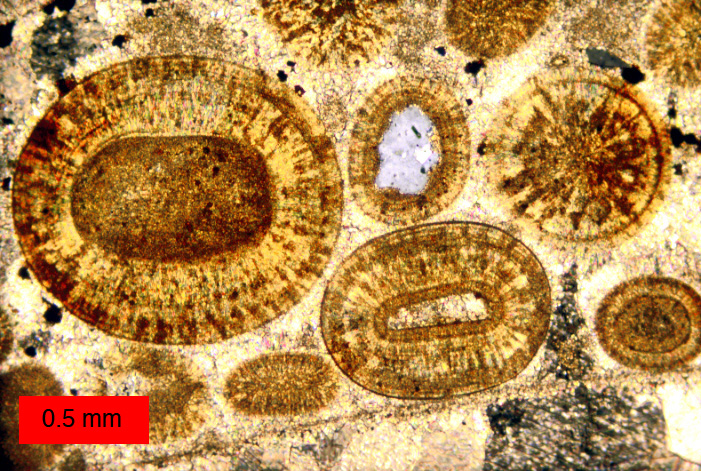
Ooids in thin-section, Carmel Formation, Jurassic of Utah

In limestone rocks there are different types of possible bioclasts, depending on the region, time and the climate during the formation stage.

Skeletal fragments: this type of limestone texture can be found as whole micro-fossils, whole large fossils or broken up fragments of larger fossils. This is the most common texture. The kinds of skeletal particles present depend upon the age of the rock and the paleoenvironmental conditions from the time they were deposited. With these different types of fossils, certain ones will be more dominant in a certain rock compared to others. Trilobite skeletal fragments, for example, are a characteristic of early Paleozoic rock units but are not found in Cenozoic rocks, which is dominated by foraminifers.

The climates and wave conditions play a role on the formation of skeletal fragments by that organisms like branching forms of bryozoan are fragile and are not found in high wave energy environments. Found in limestone units that have been deposited under quite less active water conditions.

Ooids are coated carbonate grains that have some sort of a nucleus-a bioclast (shell fragment) in this case. They form where strong bottom currents and rough water conditions are present and where saturation levels of bicarbonates are high.

== Mont Saint-Michel sediment ==
Sediments from Mont Saint-Michel region in France are a mixture of heterometric bioclastic debris and shell debris. This material has been reworked over time by the waves and ocean currents from the regions tidal flats. The shells are in the shape of a plate, curved and angular. With these characteristics it is easy for the bioclasts (shells) to be lifted and moved by the flow of the water currents. Joint density is when an object like a rock is being jointed by more matrix components rather than bioclasts, this is higher in rocks with a lower percent of figured grains and lower in rocks with higher amounts of figured grains (bioclasts). In other words, the ratio of bioclast grains influences the joint density. In all the regions that were under study, the joint density decreased while the number of bioclasts increased. This appears to inhibit the formation of joins in all carbonate rock formations.
