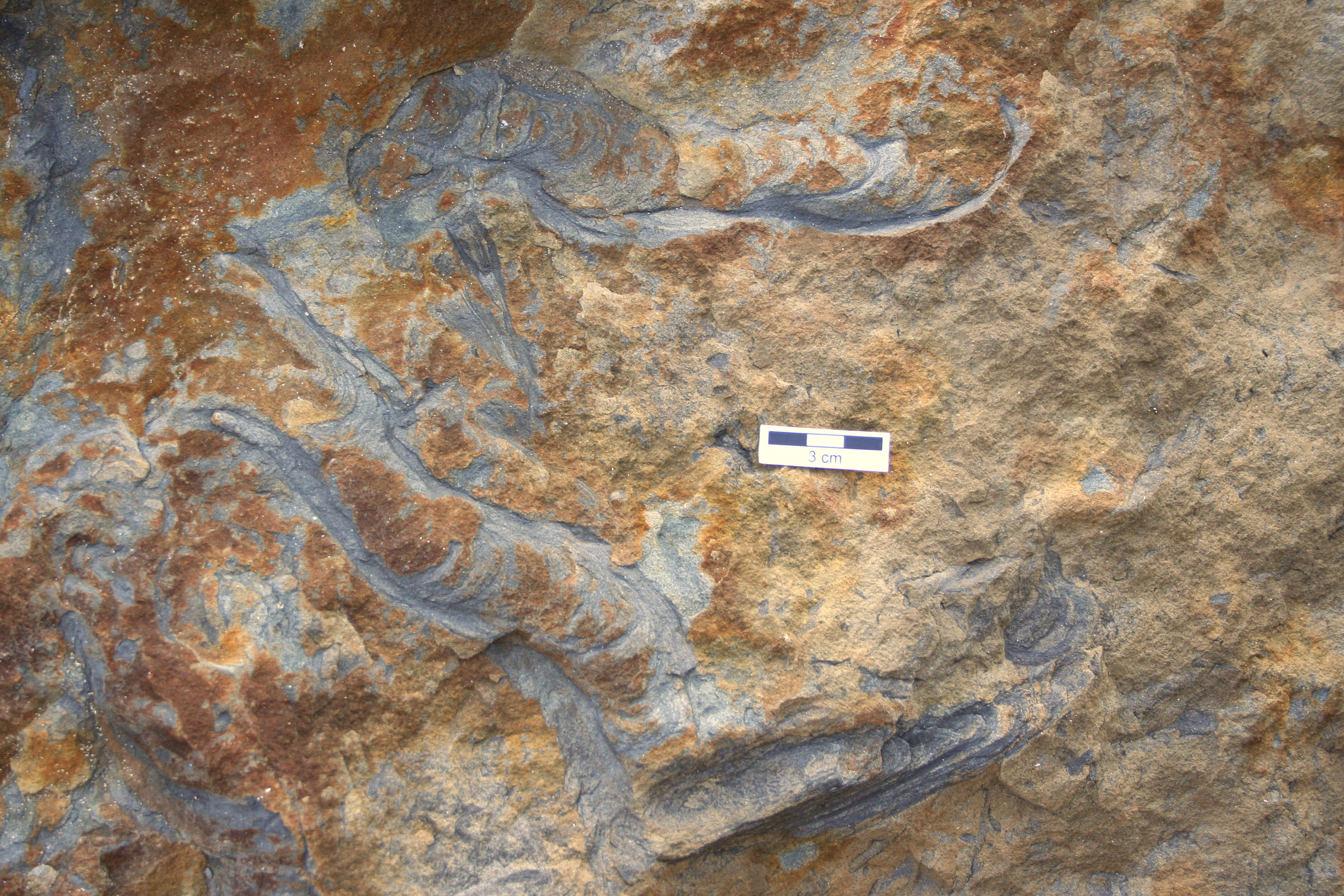
- Bedding plane view of Rhizocorallium from the Snapper Point Formation (Permian), New South Wales

Trace fossil classification
- Ichnogenus: †Rhizocorallium; Zenker, 1836

= Rhizocorallium =

Trace fossil

Rhizocorallium is an ichnogenus of burrow, the inclination of which is typically within 10° of the bedding planes of the sediment. These burrows can be very large, over a meter long in sediments that show good preservation, e.g. Jurassic rocks of the Yorkshire Coast (eastern United Kingdom), but the width is usually only up to 2 cm, restricted by the size of the organisms producing it. It is thought that they represent fodinichnia as the animal (probably a polychaete) scoured the sediment for food.

== Ichnogenus ==
The ichnogenus Rhizocorallium Zenker 1836 includes three ichnospecies: Rhizocorallium jenense Zenker 1836 representing straight, short U-shaped spreite-burrows commonly oblique to bedding plane, and only rarely horizontal, Rhizocorallium irregulare Mayer 1954 representing long, sinuous, bifurcating or planispiral U-shaped spreite-burrows, mainly horizontal, and Rhizocorallium uliarense Firtion 1958 representing trochospiral U-shaped spreite-burrows (definitions after Fürsich 1974).
