= Jinju Formation =

Early Cretaceous geologic formation in South Korea

- Stratigraphic range: Albian; ~112.4–106.5 Ma
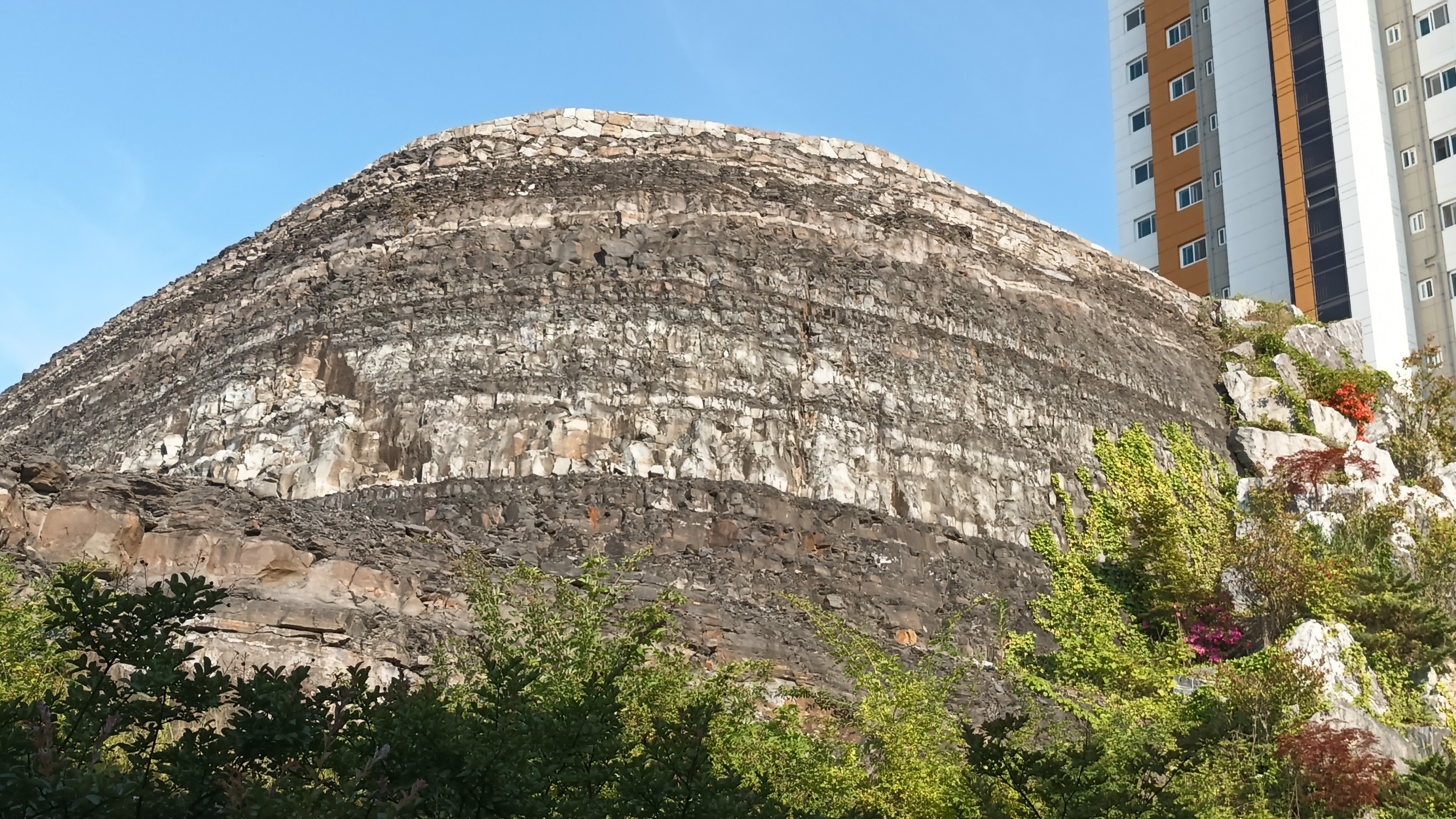
- Outcrop of the Jinju Formation in Jinju
- Type: Geological formation
- Unit of: Shindong Group
- Underlies: Chilgog Formation in Miryang Subbasin; Iljig Formation in Euiseong Subbasin
- Overlies: Hasandong Formation
- Thickness: 600–1,800 m (2,000–5,900 ft)

Lithology
- Primary: Shale
- Other: Sandstone

Location
- Coordinates: 35.1°N 128.1°E
- Approximate paleocoordinates: 44.3°N 122.7°E
- Region: Gyeongsang Province
- Country: South Korea
- Extent: Gyeongsang Basin(ko:경상 분지)

Type section
- Named for: Jinju
- Named by: Tateiwa, 1929
- Jinju Formation (South Korea)

The Jinju Formation (Korean: 진주층; Hanja: 晋州層), also known as the Dongmyeong Formation (Korean: 동명층; Hanja: 東明層) in some literature is a Lower Cretaceous formation in South Korea. Lithology of the Jinju Formation could be distinguished from overlying and underlying formations by lack of red beds in the entire formation.

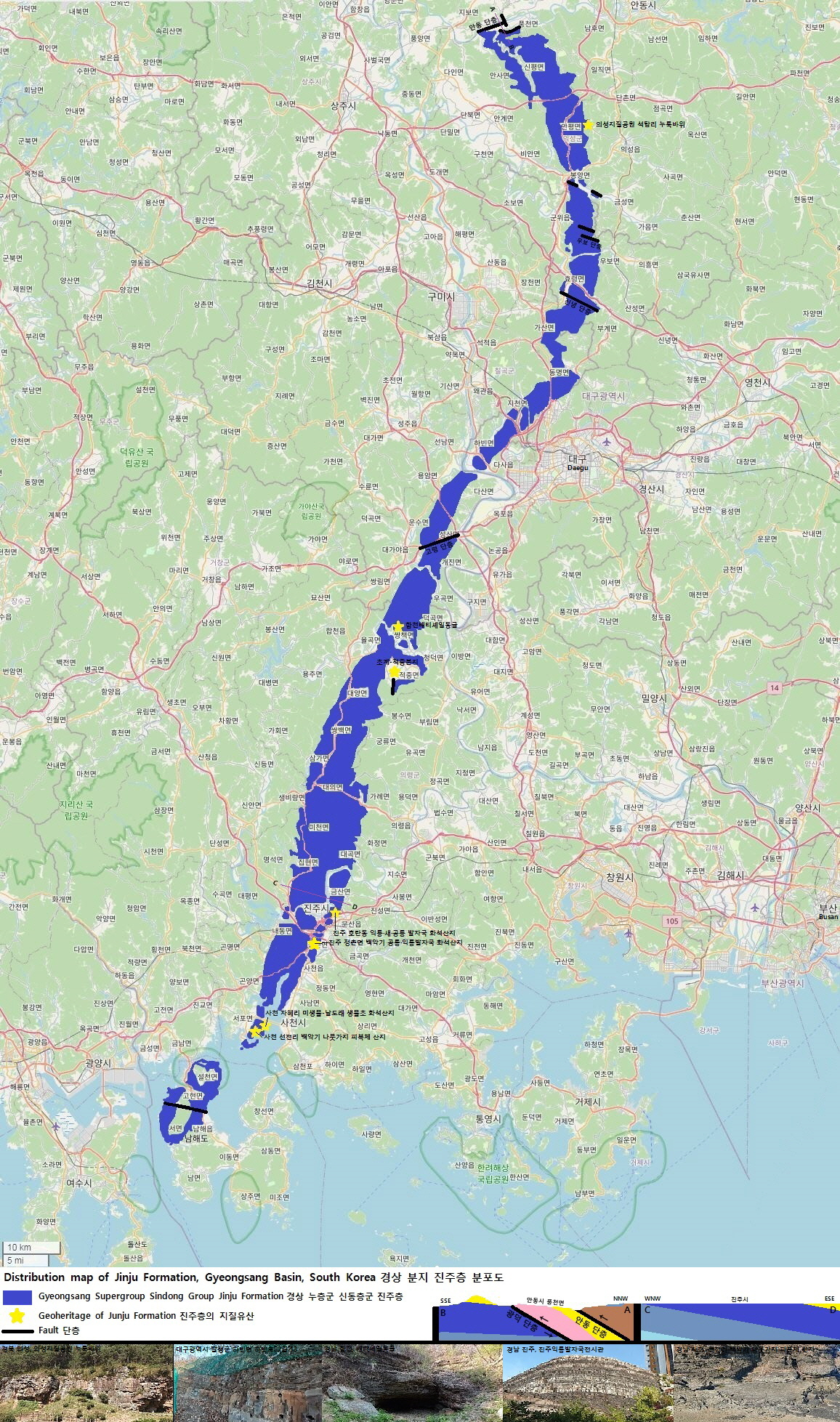
The Distribution of the Jinju Formation

The depositional age of this formation spans from approximately 112.4 ± 1.3 to 106.5 million years ago (early Albian) based on detrital zircon U-Pb dating. It predominantly consists of black shale, with sandstone packets, deposited in a fluvial-lacustrine setting. The entire paleoenvironment of the Jinju Formation is interpreted as a balanced-fill lake basin, with deltas and streams.

A diverse arthropod fauna, including isopods, spiders, and insects, is known from the formation. Other notable fossils known from the formation include several freshwater fishes, ostracods, and plants. This formation has also "attracted global ichnological attention" for the variety of important ichnofossils. Columnar and rod-shaped stromatolites have also been found here.

== Fossil content ==
Color key
Taxon	Reclassified taxon	Taxon falsely reported as present	Dubious taxon or junior synonym	Ichnotaxon	Ootaxon	Morphotaxon

Notes
Uncertain or tentative taxa are in small text; ~~crossed out~~ taxa are discredited.

=== Plants ===
Based on plant fossil records, the Jinju Flora is interpreted as a temperate intermontane savannah, due to mountain barriers blocking moisture. The assemblage was dominated by stress-tolerant, low-diversity flora adapted to the arid conditions or to localized waterlogged niches. Not only restricted to the Jinju Formation, but the entire floral diversity was relatively low throughout the entire Gyeongsang Supergroup. Palynofossil records also suggest the Jinju Formation was overall arid.

Unnamed plant remains include 3 different types of unidentified ferns, at least 2 types of seed cones, a conifer pollen cone, detached conifer seed cone scales, a connate bractate organ of unknown affinity, and at least 9 different types of diaspores, including winged forms and likely fleshy forms.

Plants of the Jinju Formation
Genus	Species	Region	Member	Material	Notes	Image
Equisetum	E. cf. burchardti				Horsetail	
Equisetum	E. sp.				Horsetail	
Equisetites	E. naktongensis				Horsetail	
Hausmannia	H. sp.				Dipteridaceae fern	
cf. Klukia	cf. K. sp.				Schizaeaceae fern	
Ruffordia	R. sp.				Schizaeaceae fern	
Onychiopsis	O. elongata				leptosporangiate fern	
Cladophlebis	C. sp. A				Fern, family unknown.	
Cladophlebis	C. sp. B				Fern, family unknown.	
Cladophlebis	C. sp. C				Fern, family unknown.	
Cladophlebis	C. sp. D				Fern, family unknown.	
Cladophlebis	C. sp. E				Fern, family unknown.	
Sphenopteris	S. sp. A				Fern, family unknown.	
Sphenopteris	S. sp. B				Fern, family unknown.	
Sphenopteris	S. sp. C				Fern, family unknown.	
Sectilopteris	S. sp. A				Fern, family unknown.	
Sectilopteris	S. sp. B				Fern, family unknown.	
Pseudofrenelopsis	P. sp.				Fern, family unknown.	Scale- and awl-leaved Cheirolepidiaceae conifer
Platycladium	P. sp.				Scale- and awl-leaved conifer, family unknown. Cupressinocladus sp. described in Kim 2009 might allied with this taxon.	
Geinitzia	G. sp. A				Divergent-leaved Geinitziaceae conifer	
Geinitzia	G. sp. B				Divergent-leaved Geinitziaceae conifer	
Pagiophyllum	P. sp. A				Scale- and awl-leaved conifer, family unknown.	
Pagiophyllum	P. sp. B				Scale- and awl-leaved conifer, family unknown.	
Elatocladus	E. sp. A				Divergent-leaved conifer, family unknown.	
Elatocladus	E. sp. B				Divergent-leaved conifer, family unknown.	
Pityophyllum	P. sp. A				Divergent-leaved conifer	
Pityophyllum	P. sp. B				Divergent-leaved conifer	
Brachyphyllum	B. japonicum				Scale- and awl-leaved conifer, family unknown.	
Brachyphyllum	B. sp. A				Scale- and awl-leaved conifer, family unknown.	
Brachyphyllum	B. sp. B				Scale- and awl-leaved conifer, family unknown.	
Brachyphyllum	B. sp. C				Scale- and awl-leaved conifer, family unknown.	
Cupressinocladus	C. sp. A				Scale- and awl-leaved conifer. The presence of this taxon indicates that a mixed type of the Tetori-Type and the Ryoseki-Type flora existed in this formation.	
Cupressinocladus	C. sp. B				Scale- and awl-leaved conifer. The presence of this taxon indicates that a mixed type of the Tetori-Type and the Ryoseki-Type flora existed in this formation.	
Podozamites	P. sp.				Broadleaf conifer, family unknown.	
Krassilovia	K. sp.			Seed cones	Krassiloviaceae conifer	
cf. Elatides	cf. E. sp.			Seed cones	Cupressaceae conifer	
Pityospermum	P. sp.			A diaspore	Pinaceae conifer	
Desmiophyllum	D. sp.				Non-conifer broadleaf gymnosperm, family unknown.	
Doylea	D. sp.			Bifurcated seed-bearing cupulate unit	Doylealean gymnosperm	
Jarudia	J. sp.			Seed-bearing cupulate unit with 2 distal seeds	Doylealean gymnosperm	
Umaltolepis	U. sp.			Seed-bearing capulate units	Possible Ginkgoopsid	

=== Spiders ===
Spiders of the Jinju Formation
Genus	Species	Region	Member	Material	Notes	Image
Korearachne	K. jinju	Sacheon			likely to be a lycosoid	
Koreamegops	K. samsiki	Jinju and Sacheon			a lagonomegopid	
Jinjumegops	J. dalingwateri	Jinju			a lagonomegopid	
Mygalomorphae	Indeterminate	Sacheon				
Araneomorphae	Indeterminate	Sacheon				
Palpimanoidea	Indeterminate	Sacheon				
"Cribellate Entelegynae"	"species 1"	Jinju				
"Cribellate Entelegynae"	"species 2"	Jinju				

=== Insects ===
==== Odonata ====
Dragonflies and damselflies of the Jinju Formation
Genus	Species	Region	Member	Material	Notes	Image
Hemeroscopus	H. baissicus	Sacheon, Gunwi and Jinju		Both nymphs and adults		
Hemeroscopus	H. jinjuensis	Sacheon		Two wings		
Koreapodagrion	K. coloratus	Jinju		Isolated wings		

==== Dermaptera ====
Earwigs of the Jinju Formation
Genus	Species	Region	Member	Material	Notes	Image
cf. Pygidicranoidea	indeterminate					

==== Orthoptera ====
Orthopterans of the Jinju Formation
Genus	Species	Region	Member	Material	Notes	Image
Panorpidium	P. spica				A member of Elcanidae	

==== Dictyoptera ====
Dictyopterans of the Jinju Formation
Genus	Species	Region	Member	Material	Notes	Image
Cretophotina	C. smidovae				A member of Mantodea	
Juramantis	J. jinjuensis				A member of Mantodea	
Juramantis	J. geongonrigam				A member of Mantodea	
Bubosa	B. petrarosa				A member of Blattidae	
Neoblattella	N. coockrock				A member of Ectobiidae	
Perlucipecta	P. jinjuicola				A member of Mesoblattinidae	
Perlucipecta	P. cyclopica				A member of Mesoblattinidae	
Perlucipecta	P. major				A member of Mesoblattinidae	
Praeblattella	P. tinctoria				A member of Mesoblattinidae	
Praeblattella	P. decolor				A member of Mesoblattinidae	
Mongoloblatta	M. koreaensis				A member of Mesoblattinidae	
Archimesoblatta	A. basopicta				A member of Mesoblattinidae	
Spinaeblattina	S. variabilitta				A member of Mesoblattinidae	
Jinjublatta	J. cascadaerrorum				A member of Mesoblattinidae	
Stictolampra	S. baqueuii				A member of Blaberidae	
Holocompsa	H. scleroptera				A member of Corydiidae	
Ioouoonool	I. taktobybolo				A member of Corydiidae	
Asioblatta	A. jeongchonensis				A member of Raphidiomimidae	
Cameloblatta	C. immaculata				A member of Raphidiomimidae	
Tayphoonoblatta	T. correntini				A member of Raphidiomimidae	
Elongatoblatta	E. minsuki				A member of Raphidiomimidae	
Ano	A. ale				A member of Liberiblattinidae	
Brutalista	B. masivny				A member of Liberiblattinidae	
Blattula	B. pessimusestfinis				A member of Blattulidae	
Elisama	E. baeki				A member of Blattulidae	
Elisama	E. simplex				A member of Blattulidae	
Elisama	E. gwanghyeoni				A member of Blattulidae	
Ocellonlattula	O. gyongsangensis				A member of Blattulidae	
Vrtula	V. jinjuensis				A member of Blattulidae	
Vrtula	V. gwanghyeonensis				A member of Blattulidae	
Memento	M. futuri				A member of Caloblattinidae	
Sclerotermes	S. samsiki	Jinju			A termite known only from an isolated wing, uncertain placement	
Umenocoleus	U. minimus				A member of Umenocoleidae	
Pseudoblattapterix	P. weoni				A member of Umenocoleidae	
Petropterix	P. koreaensis				A member of Umenocoleidae	
Petropterix	P. oculata				A member of Umenocoleidae	
Petropterix	P. nikdyviac				A member of Umenocoleidae	
Blattapterix	B. reticulata				A member of Umenocoleidae	
Alienopterus	A. imposter				A member of Alienopteridae	
Recyklovany	R. koltoc				A member of Alienopteridae	
Caputoraptor	C. ganggu				A member of Alienopteridae	
Indeterminate	5 indeterminate taxa					

==== Hemiptera ====
Hemipterans of the Jinju Formation
Genus	Species	Region	Member	Material	Notes	Image
Corixidae	indeterminate	Sacheon			Not fully described	
Jinjucixius	J. fui	Jinju and Gunwi			A member of Cixiidae	
Jinjupopovina	J. eosahwae	Jinju			A member of Yuripopovinidae	

==== Hymenoptera ====
Hymenopterans of the Jinju Formation
Genus	Species	Region	Member	Material	Notes	Image
Korehelorus	K. jinjuensis	Jinju			A parasitic wasp belonging to the family Heloridae	
Hanguksyntexis	H. haeretica	Jinju			A sawfly belonging to the family Anaxyelidae	
Cretosphecium	C. jinjuensis	Jinju			A wasp belonging to the family Angarosphecidae	
Ghilarella	G. jinjuensis	Jinju			Sepulcidae wasp	
Meiaghilarella	M. stanislawlemi	Jinju			Sepulcidae wasp	

==== Raphidioptera ====
Snakeflies of the Jinju Formation
Genus	Species	Region	Member	Material	Notes	Image
Mesoraphidia	M. koreensis				A member of Mesoraphidiidae	
Mesoraphidia	M. phantasma				A member of Mesoraphidiidae	

==== Neuroptera ====
Lacewings of the Jinju Formation
Genus	Species	Region	Member	Material	Notes	Image
Tachinymphes	T. koraiensis				A member of the family Mesochrysopidae.	
Araripeneura	A. asiatica				A member of Araripeneuridae	
Araripenymphes	A. koreicus				A member of Cratosmylidae	

==== Coleoptera ====
Beetles of the Jinju Formation
Genus	Species	Region	Member	Material	Notes	Image
Coptoclava	C. spinosa	Jinju and Gunwi		Larval remains abundant; Adult remains relatively rare	A member of the extinct family Coptoclavidae.	
Megalithomerus	M. magolhalmii				A member of Elateridae	
Koreagrypnus	K. jinju				A member of Elateridae	
Cryptocoelus	C. minimus				A member of Elateridae	
Cretosaja	C. jinjuensis				A member of Silphidae	
Notocupes	N. premeris				A member of Archostemata	
Asiana	A. pax				A member of Archostemata	
Brochocoleus	B. sacheonensis				A member of Ommatidae	
Brochocoleus	B. cf. punctatus				A member of Ommatidae	
Omma	O. sp.				A member of Ommatidae	
Zygadenia	Z. cornigera				A member of Ommatidae	
Laetopsia	L. leei				A member of Hydrophiloidea	
Laetopsia	L. cf. hydraneoides				A member of Hydrophiloidea	
Laetopsia	L. sp.				A member of Hydrophiloidea	
Cretotaenia	C. pallida				A member of Hydrophiloidea	
Psacodromeus	P. recta				A member of Trachypachidae	
Necronectulus	N. lazarus				A member of Trachypachidae	

==== Diptera ====
Flies of the Jinju Formation
Genus	Species	Region	Member	Material	Notes	Image
Buccinatormyia	B. gangnami				A member of the family Zhangsolvidae. Named after Gangnam Style, the famous K-Pop hit song	

=== Crustaceans ===
==== Isopoda ====
Isopods of the Jinju Formation
Genus	Species	Region	Member	Material	Notes	Image
Archaeoniscus	A. coreaensis	Sacheon and Jinju			A freshwater occurrence of the genus Archaeoniscus	

==== Ostracoda ====
Ostracods of the Jinju Formation
Genus	Species	Region	Member	Material	Notes	Image
Scabriculocypris	S. yanbianensis	Jinju				
Cypridea	C. jinjuria	Jinju				
Cypridea	C. khandae	Jinju and Sacheon				
Cypridea	C. samesi	Jinju				
Mongolocypris	M. kohi	Jinju				
Lycopterocypris	L. cf. celsa	Jinju				
Candona	C. sp.	Jinju				
Djungarica	D. sp.	Jinju				
Rhinocypris	R. sp.	Chilgok			Previously assigned to as Ilyocypris sp.	

==== Spinicaudata ====
Clam shrimps of the Jinju Formation
Genus	Species	Region	Member	Material	Notes	Image
Yanjiestheria	Y. kyongsangensis					
Yanjiestheria	Y. chekiangensis					
Yanjiestheria	Y. cf. wannanensis					
Yanjiestheria	Y. jinjuensis					
Yanjiestheria	Y. sp.					

=== Vertebrates ===
==== Actinopterygii ====
Fishes of the Jinju Formation
Genus	Species	Region	Member	Material	Notes	Image
Wakinoichthys	W. aokii			Multiple complete skeletons	An osteoglossiform	
Jinjuichthys	J. cheongi	Jinju		Articulated skeletons	A possible ichthyodectiform, though this classification remains controversial	
Albuliformes	indeterminate					
Sinamia	S. sp.			Articulated incomplete tail	An amiiform	
Lepidotes	L. sp.			Articulated skeleton, missing the anterior part of the head	Largest fish found in this formation, reaching 40 cm (1.3 ft) in total length.	
Elopiformes	indeterminate				A small fish, reaching 3 cm (1.2 in) in total length.	

==== Reptiles ====
Reptiles of the Jinju Formation
Genus	Species	Region	Member	Material	Notes	Image
Crocodyliformes indet.		Goryeong		a right mandible		
Titanosauriformes indet.		Sacheon and Goryeong		teeth	A tooth from Sacheon was initially suggested to be of Asian Brachiosaurid by Lim, Martin and Baek (2001), but Barrett et al. (2002) and Choi & Lee (2017) consider it to be indeterminate titanosauriform. Meanwhile, another tooth from Goryeong was suggested to be of Diplodocoidea by Yun et al. (2007), but Choi and Lee (2017) also considered it indeterminate titanosauriform.	
Pterodactyloidea indet.		Goryeong		teeth	While the KPE 40001 suggested to be of Boreopterid origin by Choi & Lee (2017), Yun (2021) and Yun (2024) consider them to be Anhanguerian instead based on the morphological disparity from Boreopteridae and the results of two-dimensional geometric morphometric analyses.	

=== Mollusks ===
==== Bivalvia ====
Bivalves of the Jinju Formation
Genus	Species	Region	Member	Material	Notes	Image
Plicatounio	P. naktongensis	Goryeong				
Nagdongia	N. soni	Goryeong				
Trigonioides	T. jaehoi	Goryeong				

==== Gastropoda ====
Gastropods of the Jinju Formation
Genus	Species	Region	Member	Material	Notes	Image
Brotiopsis	B. kobayashi				Dominant gastropod of the formation	
Thiara	T. sp.					
Viviparus	V. sp.					

=== Ichnofossils ===
Unnamed ichnofossils from the Jinju Formation include Ornithopod tracks and Caddisfly bioherms.

Ichnofossils of the Jinju Formation
Ichnogenus	Ichnospecies	Region	Member	Material	Notes	Image
Gyeongsangsauropus	G. isp.	Jinju			Sauropod tracks	
Grallator	G. isp.	Jinju			Theropod track; similar to the ichnospecies G. yangi	
Corpulentapus	C. isp.	Jinju			Theropod track	
Asianopodus	A. isp.	Jinju			Theropod track	
Minisauripus	M. isp.	Jinju			One of the smallest known theropod tracks. Currently the oldest record of this ichnogenus from South Korea.	
Dromaeosauriformipes	D. rarus	Jinju			The smallest known non-avian dinosaur didactyl tracks possibly made by a small microraptorine, with indication of important flight behaviors such as flap-running, take-off, and landing.	
Dromaeosauripus	D. jinjuensis	Sacheon			Didactyl tracks made by a 40 cm (1.3 ft) tall dromaeosaur.	
Ignotornis	I. seoungjoseoi	Sacheon			Bird Track	
Jindongornipes	J. isp.	Sacheon			Bird Track	
Koreasaltipes	K. jinjuensis	Jinju			Traces left by a hopping mammal	
Neosauroides	N. innovatus	Jinju			The largest reported lizard trackway in South Korea.	
cf. Chelichnus	cf. C. isp.	Sacheon			Turtle trackway; first identified as Chelonipus isp.	
Ranipes	indeterminate	Jinju			Oldest known frog trackway. Made by a species that hopped in short distances.	
Crocodylopodus	C. isp.	Sacheon and Jinju			First report of this ichnogenus from Asia.	
Batrachopus	B. grandis	Sacheon			Archosaur track made by either a bipedal crocodylomorph or therizinosaur; the pterosaur trackway ichnospecies Haenamichnus gainensis from the Haman Formation is now assigned to this species as B. cf. grandis. Paleontologist James I. Kirkland expresses doubts on the ichnogenus assignment.	
Pteraichnus	P. gracilis	Jinju			Pterosaur trackways. P. seopoensis is currently a naked name, since it was only described in a master's thesis.	
Pteraichnus	"P. seopoensis"	Sacheon			Pterosaur trackways. P. seopoensis is currently a naked name, since it was only described in a master's thesis.	
Jinjuichnus	J. procerus	Jinju			Pterosaur trackway associated with a small vertebrate trackway, showing possible stalking behavior.	
Lockeia	L. gigantus				Resting trace, made by bivalves	
Diplichnites	D. isp.				Arthropod tracks	
Coclichnus	C. isp.				Trace by Annelids	
Radialimbricatus	R. bitoensis				Potential tracemakers include arthropods, cnidarians or annelids	
Protovirgularia	P. dichotoma				First nonmarine occurrence of this ichnotaxon; possibly made by larvae of dragonfly	
Fictovichnus	indeterminate				Probable insect cocoon or pupation chamber; the earliest record of an insect pupation structure probably associated with a burrow	
Chondrites	C. isp.					
Palaeophycus	P. tubularis					
Helminthopsis	H. hieroglyphica					
Skolithos	S. magnus					
Taenidium	T. barretti					
Torrowangea	T. rosei					

== See also ==
- ko:경상 분지 (Gyeongsang Basin)
- Geology of South Korea § Gyeongsang Basin
- List of dinosaur- bearing rock formations
  - List of stratigraphic units with indeterminate dinosaur fossils
