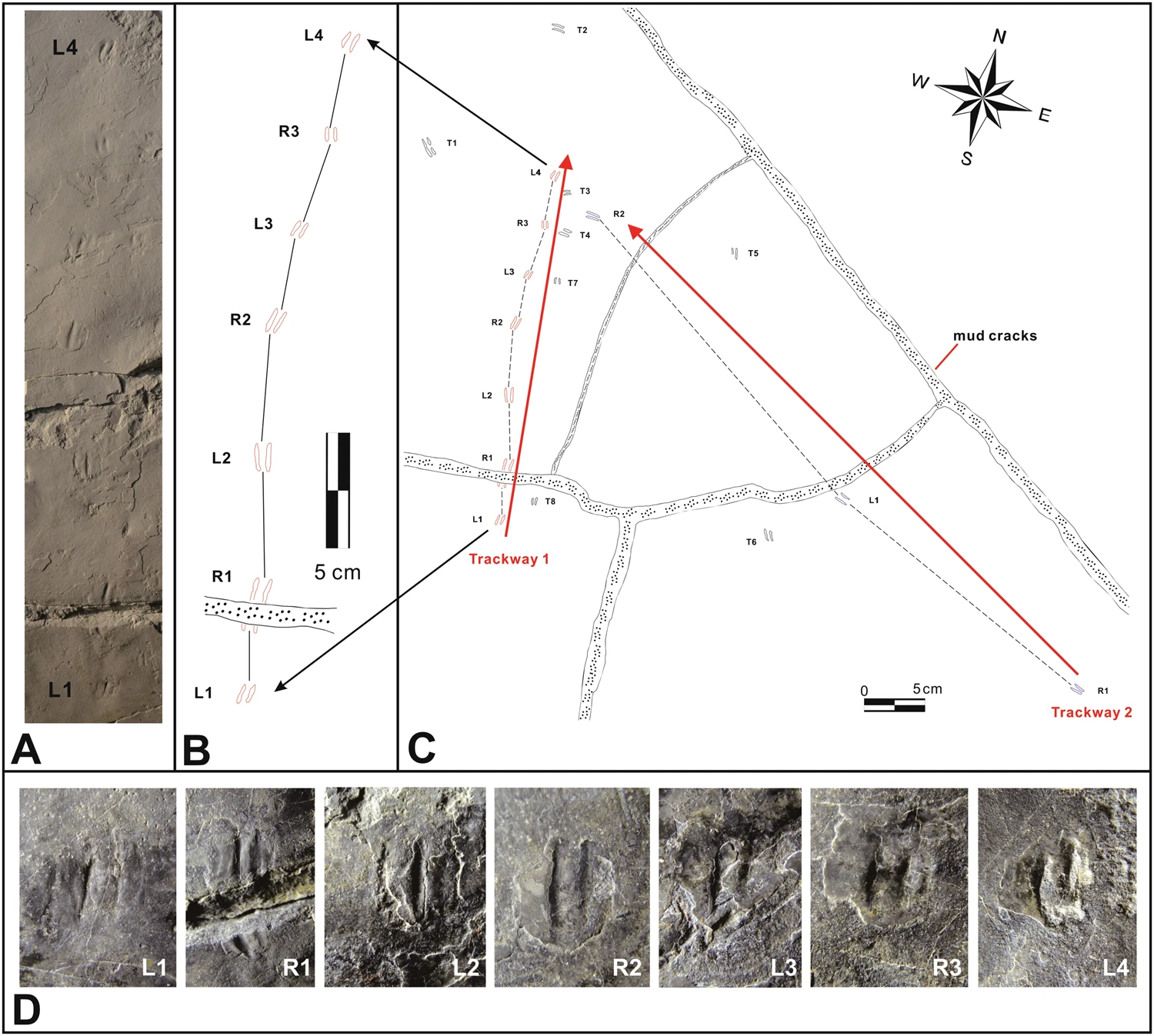
- Holotype and paratype of Dromaeosauriformipes rarus

Trace fossil classification
- Ichnogenus: †Dromaeosauriformipes; Kim et al., 2018

Type ichnospecies
- †Dromaeosauriformipes rarus Kim et al., 2018

= Dromaeosauriformipes =

Dromaeosauriformipes Temporal range: Albian ~112.4–106.5 Ma

Ichnogenus of dinosaur

Dromaeosauriformipes is an ichnogenus of probable microraptorine dromaeosaurid theropod from the Early Cretaceous (Albian) of South Korea. The type and only ichnospecies is D. rarus, representing the smallest known didactyl (two-toed) tracks of a dromaeosaurid.

== Discovery and naming ==
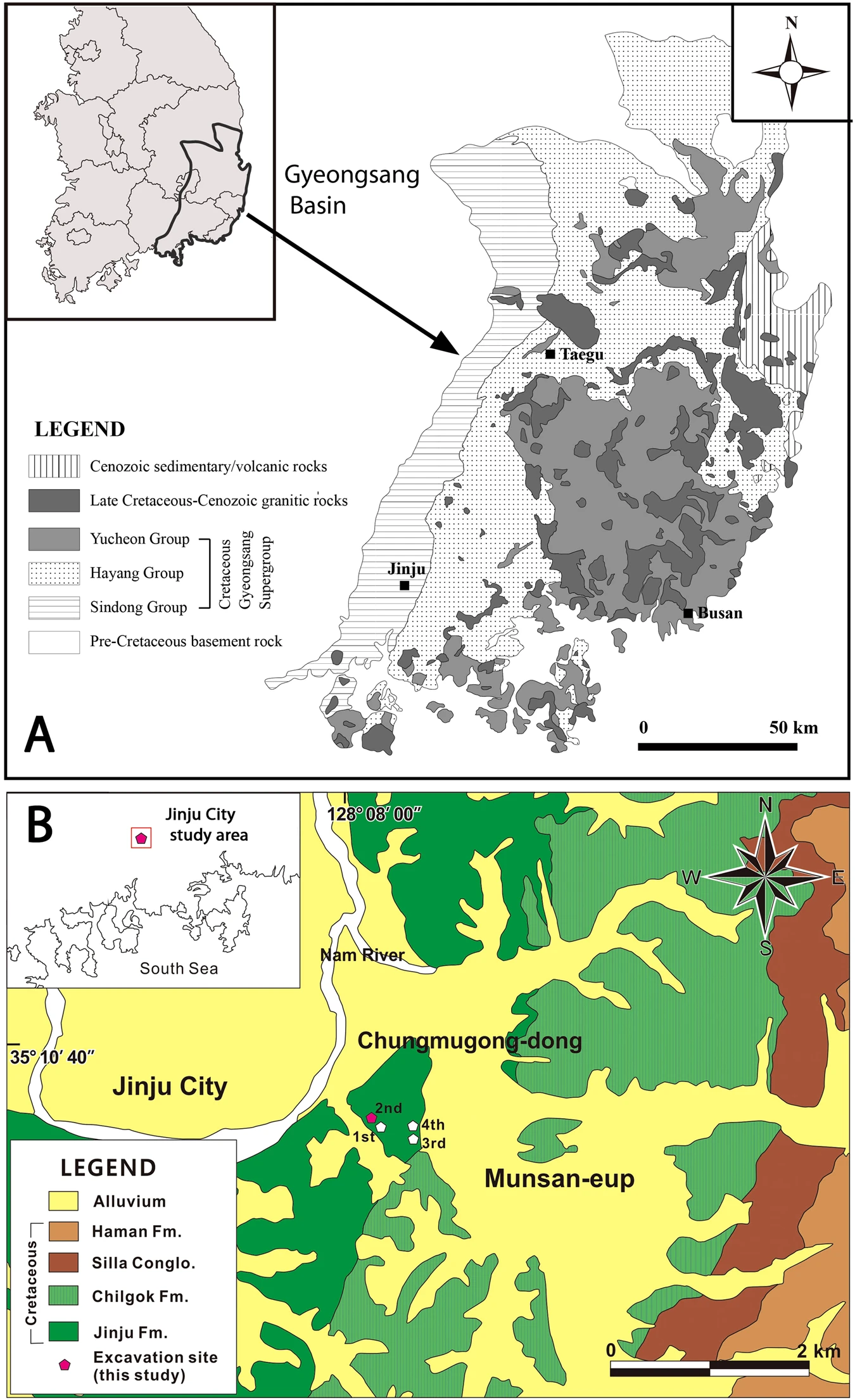
Dromaeosauriformipes type locality

Dromaeosauriformipes rarus is known from two trackways and isolated tracks found in the Jinju Formation with footprints around 1 cm (0.39 in) long. The ichnogenus is named in 2018 for its similarity in form when compared to Dromaeosauripus, a larger dromaeosaurid ichnotaxon known from the same formation only 30 kilometers away, while the ichnospecific name rarus means "small and infrequently found." Prior to the formal naming of Dromaeosauriformipes, the trackways were first noted in a 2016 conference abstracts as the smallest known didactyl dromaeosaurid footprints. The type locality Jinju Formation is dated to the lower Albian age between approximately 112.4 Ma and 106.5 Ma based on detrital zircon U-Pb dating.

Associated with the lakeshore sediments, the holotype Trackway 1 (CUE JI-2E Dr001) and the paratype Trackway 2 contains seven and three diminutive didactyl tracks respectively. The seven tracks of the holotype are consecutive, while the three tracks of the paratype are separated by two long steps. Eight isolated tracks are also assigned to this ichnotaxon, resulting in a total of eighteen tracks found in the same locality. Considering that a single trackway possibly represents a single individual, it is estimated that around six to ten small dromaeosaurid individuals made each of their own trackways. Alex Dececchi nicknamed the paratype Trackway 2 as "Maverick" from Top Gun based on his assumption that the trackway represents behaviors indicative of takeoff for flight.

== Description ==
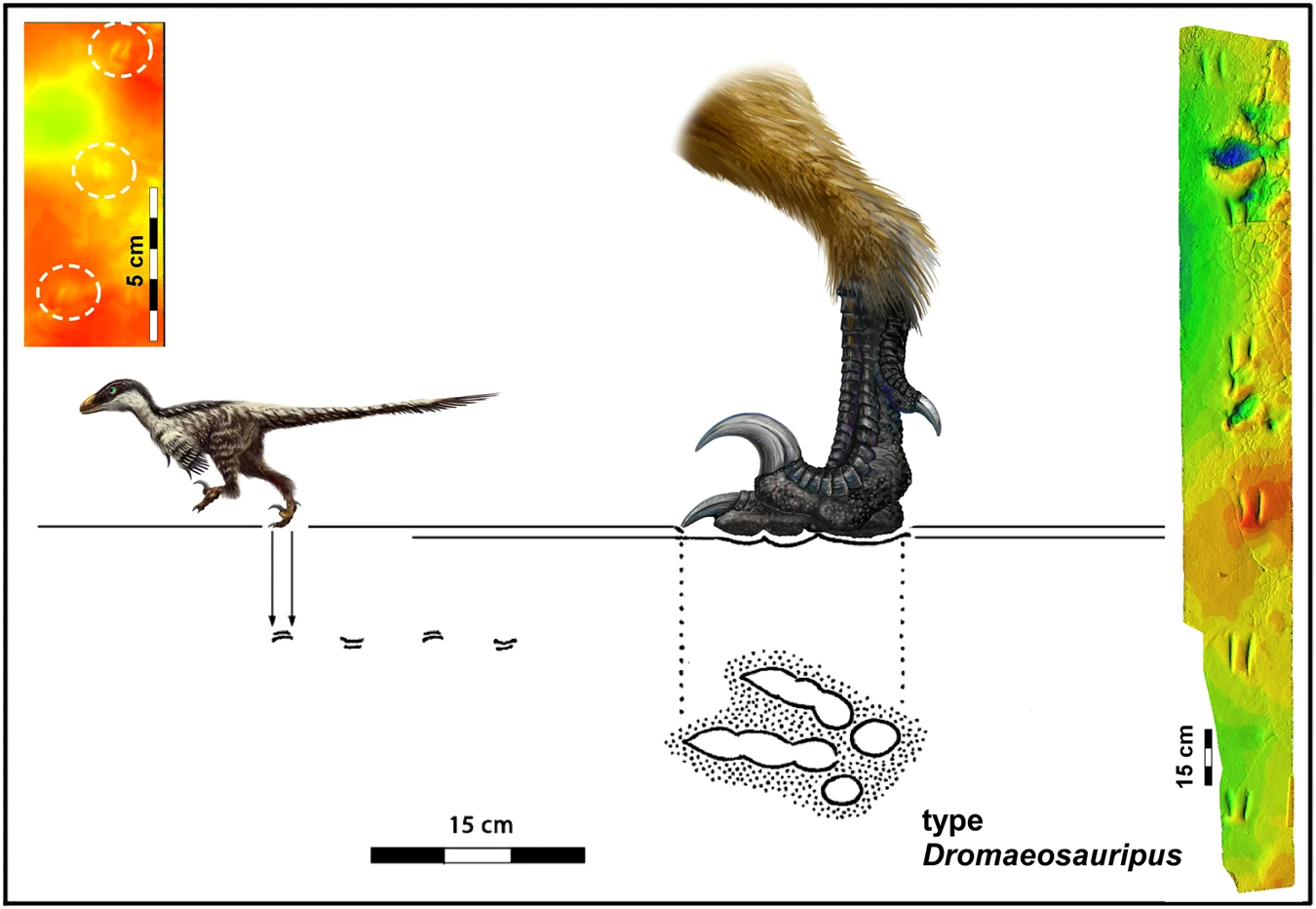
Diagram of Dromaeosauriformipes (left) and Dromaeosauripus (right)

Deinonychosaurian theropods, especially members of the family Dromaeosauridae, are known for their recurved, sickle-shaped claw on the second toe being held off the ground, and thus not preserved in the trackway. This causes their footprints to preserve only two of their toes, making the deinonychosaurian tracks functionally didactyl (two-toed). The similarly sized, small theropod ichnotaxon Minisauripus, also known from the same formation and other East Asian deposits, is distinguished from Dromaeosauriformipes with all of the three toes preserved in the trackway, making the tracks assigned to Minisauripus functionally tridactyl (three-toed).

Footprints of both the holotype and paratype trackway of Dromaeosauriformipes are similar in size, roughly 1.0 cm (0.39 in) long and 0.4 cm (0.16 in) wide in average. The average step length between each of the seven consecutive tracks of the holotype is 4.62 cm (1.82 in), while the two long steps of the paratype are measured up to 25.16 and 31.28 cm (9.91 and 12.31 in) long respectively. With the comparative dataset of 17 microraptorine specimens, Dececchi et al. (2024) estimated the hip height of the paratype trackmaker up to 4.75 cm (1.87 in) tall.

The diminutive size of the didactyl tracks is consistent with that of small dromaeosaurids, so the trackmaker of Dromaeosauriformipes is likely to be either a small microraptorine or a juvenile of a larger dromaeosaurid like the trackmaker of Dromaeosauripus. However, the proximal portion of the second digit is not preserved in any tracks assigned to Dromaeosauriformipes, which distinguishes this ichnotaxon from other dromaeosaurid ichnogenera. Additionally, the size and degree of elongation shown in the footprints of Dromaeosauriformipes are different from those of Dromaeosauripus.

== Classification ==
Dromaeosauriformipes represents one of the few known fossil records of Early Cretaceous dromaeosaurids in South Korea, along with the indeterminate dromaeosaurid femur from the Gugyedong Formation and two ichnospecies of Dromaeosauripus, D. hamanensis from the Haman Formation and D. jinjuensis from the Jinju Formation. It wasn't assigned to a specific ichnofamily until Tsukiji et al. (2021) tentatively included it within Dromaeopodidae, with this ichnotaxon also showing a fast gait indicated in dromaeosaurid tracks.

In 2024, the describers of the deinonychosaurian ichnotaxon Fujianipus yingliangi amended the ichnofamily Dromaeopodidae as the ichnosubfamily Dromaeopodinae under their newly erected ichnofamily Deinonychosauripodidae. They stated that the inclusion of Dromaeosauriformipes within this ichnotaxonomic group is possible, but noted the uncertainty in its classification. In the same year, Dececchi and colleagues favored the microraptorine interpretation for the trackmaker of Dromaeosauriformipes based on the paratype Trackway 2 showing indirect evidence of pre-avian flight behavior.

== Paleobiology ==
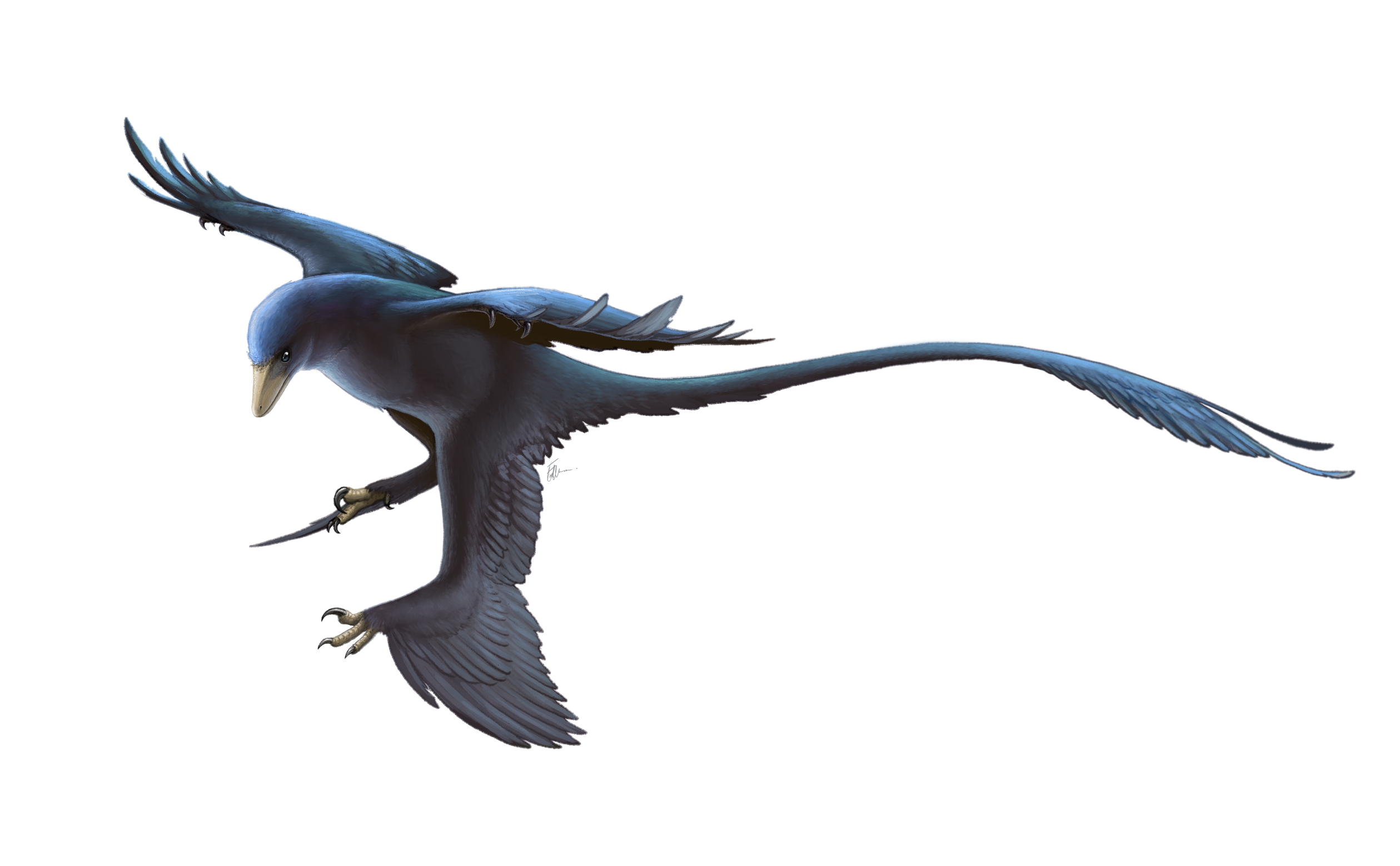
Restoration of Microraptor gui, probably related to the trackmaker of Dromaeosauriformipes

=== Diet ===
The describers of Dromaeosauriformipes suggested that its trackmaker might have been piscivorous based on its association with lakeshore sediments and fish scales found in the stomach contents of the presumably related Microraptor. Microraptorines were probably opportunistic carnivores, with the stomach contents of Microraptor showing direct dietary evidence of either predation or scavenging of other vertebrates including small mammals, enantiornitheans and lizards.

=== Speed and flight ===
The trackmaker of Dromaeosauriformipes paratype might have been a highly mobile, fast-moving animal. While the speed estimates of the holotype were around 0.6 meters per second (2.2 km/h; 1.3 mph), the paratype indicated a much faster speed around 10.5 meters per second (38 km/h; 23 mph). Although the paratype showed a significant variation in its locomotor range when compared to the holotype, the authors noted that this range and speed were consistent with those of other dinosaurs including the much larger dromaeosaurid Velociraptor.

In 2024, Dececchi and colleagues argued that the paratype Trackway 2 shows indirect behavioral evidence of pre-avian flight by a microraptorine. Although highly debated, microraptorines like Microraptor are suggested to be capable of powered flight. The locomotor behavior indicated by the paratype of Dromaeosauriformipes provides further support to this theory. Upon comparing the trackway to the data examined from a single Microraptor specimen (BMNHC PH881), Dececchi et al. (2024) concluded that the paratype Trackway 2 is likely produced by wing-assisted aerodynamic force production to extend stride length during locomotion such as flap-running, take-off and landing. They suggested that such stride length extension can lead to higher speeds that cannot be achieved by running alone, which would explain why the speed estimate for the paratype was significantly higher than that for the holotype.

Falkingham and Lallensack (2025) questioned the association of the three tracks of the paratype Trackway 2, suggesting that the tracks do not represent a continuous trackway based on inconsistency in orientation, digit width and divarication angle (the angle between the digits of each track). They claimed that the purported trackway is most likely a misattribution of isolated tracks, and noted that theropods including modern birds with three toes can leave tracks that preserve only two toes, so the possibility of the tracks definitively representing a flight behavior of a theropod with functionally didactyl feet is unlikely. Dececchi et al. (2025) published a rebuttal, arguing that the trackway is continuous and not incomplete based on the close proximity between the holotype Trackway 1 and paratype Trackway 2 and the lack of sedimentological difference. They also noted that other extremely long strides on the same slab also support their original interpretation, regardless of whether the tracks are missing.

== Paleoenvironment ==
Jinju Formation is known for its diverse invertebrate fauna such as freshwater arthropods, spiders, ostracods and various types of insects. Other notable fossils include several freshwater fishes, indeterminate archosaur fossils (titanosauriform sauropods, crocodyliforms and pterodactyloid pterosaurs) and plants. This formation has also "attracted global ichnological attention" for various important ichnofossils including Dromaeosauriformipes.
