= Tianjialou Formation =

Geologic formation in China

- Stratigraphic range: Aptian–Albian
- Type: Geological formation
- Unit of: Dasheng Group
- Overlies: Malanggou Formation

Lithology
- Primary: Sandstone, siltstone, mudstone
- Other: Conglomerate

Location
- Region: Shandong
- Country: China

The Tianjialou Formation is a Lower Cretaceous geologic formation in China. Its lithology is described as consisting "chiefly of a sequence of fine clastic lacustrine deposits, including feldspar sandstone, siltstone and mudstone". Dinosaur tracks have been discovered in the formation.

== Fossil content ==
Two types of sauropod tracks, resembling Parabrontopodus and Brontopodus respectively, are known. There are also tetradactyl ornithischian tracks, possibly left by Psittacosaurus.

Color key: Taxon / Reclassified taxon / Taxon falsely reported as present / Dubious taxon or junior synonym / Ichnotaxon / Ootaxon / Morphotaxon	Notes; Uncertain or tentative taxa are in small text; ~~crossed out~~ taxa are discredited.

Genus	Species	Region	Material	Notes	Images
Dromaeopodus	D. shandongensis	Houzuoshan Dinosaur Park in Lingquan Town, Junan County	Eight trackways, consisting of eighteen footprints in total	Large deinonychosaur tracks, most likely from a dromaeosaur. Toe and heel pads visible. Six trackways are parallel and closely spaced, suggesting group behavior.	
Minisauripus	M. zhenshuonani	Houzuoshan Dinosaur Park in Lingquan Town, Junan County	Three footprints, two of which are part of a trackway	Small tridactyl theropod tracks	
Shandongornipes	S. muxiai	Houzuoshan Dinosaur Park in Lingquan Town, Junan County	A trackway of five footprints	Moderately large, tetradactyl bird tracks with a reversed first toe; exceptionally long steps	
Velociraptorichnus	V. sichuanensis	Houzuoshan Dinosaur Park in Lingquan Town, Junan County	A trackway of two footprints	Smaller deinonychosaur tracks	
