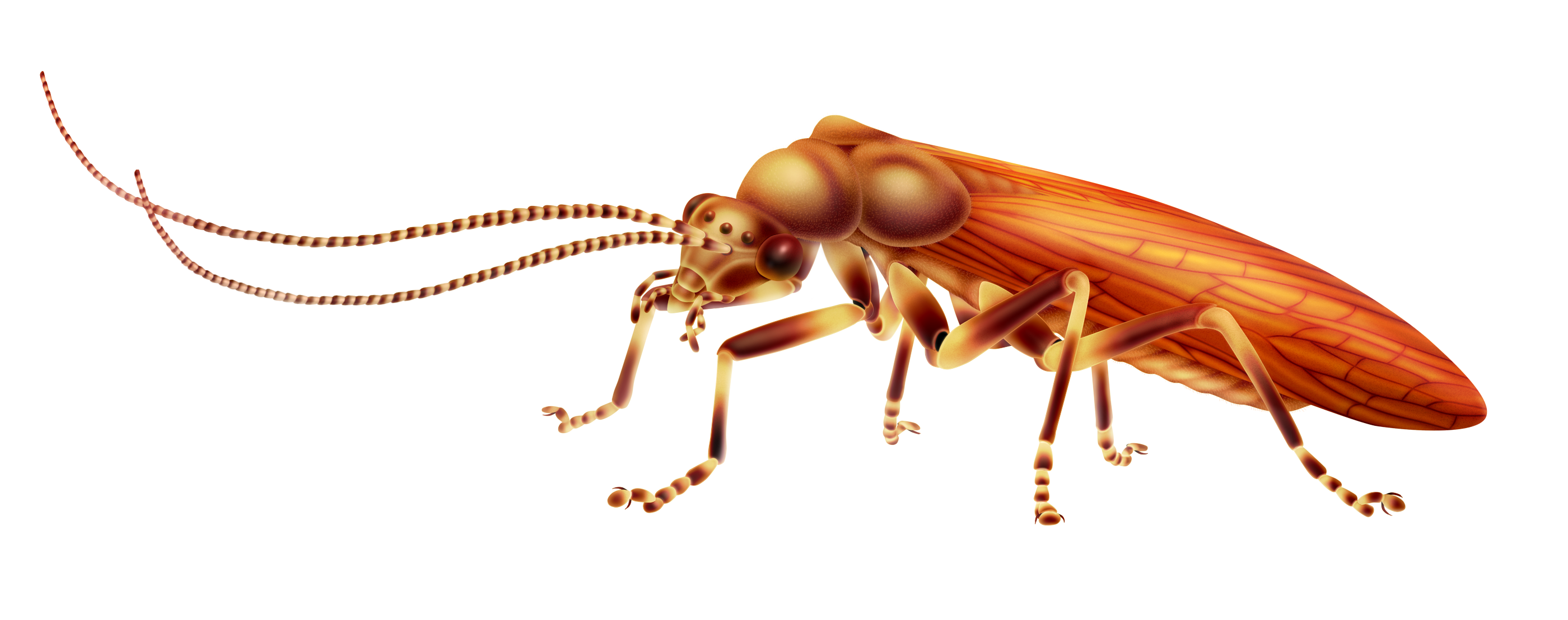
- Artistic restoration

Scientific classification
- Kingdom: Animalia
- Phylum: Arthropoda
- Clade: Pancrustacea
- Class: Insecta
- Family: †Alienopteridae
- Genus: †Alienopterus; Bai et al., 2016

Type species
- Alienopterus brachyelytrus Bai et al., 2016

Species
- †A. brachyelytrus Bai et al., 2016; †A. imposter Vršanský et al., 2025

Synonyms
- †Aethiocarenus? Poinar & Brown, 2017

= Alienopterus =

Alienopterus Temporal range: Albian–Cenomanian

Extinct genus of insects

Alienopterus is an extinct genus of insects from the Cretaceous period of Southeast Asia and East Asia. The type species A. brachyelytrus was described from the Burmese amber (Cenomanian) of Myanmar, while the other species A. imposter was described from the Jinju Formation (Albian) of South Korea. It was the first known member of the order Alienoptera until 2018, when the second and third members of the order, Caputoraptor elegans, and Alienopterella stigmatica were described. A. brachyelytrus has characters that are shared with cockroaches and mantids and is thought to represent either the sister taxon, or an ancestor to mantids.

Alienopterus has shortened forewings and functional hindwings capable of flight that are attached to pads as in the Mantophasmatodea. The foreleg has a femoral brush which is a characteristic of Mantodea. The mouth points downward from the body axis and has biting mouthparts suggestive of a predator. The antenna is long and there are large compound eyes as well as three ocelli on the head (which is never found in the Blattodea).

== See also ==
- Manipulator, an extinct cockroach that has characteristics similar to mantids
