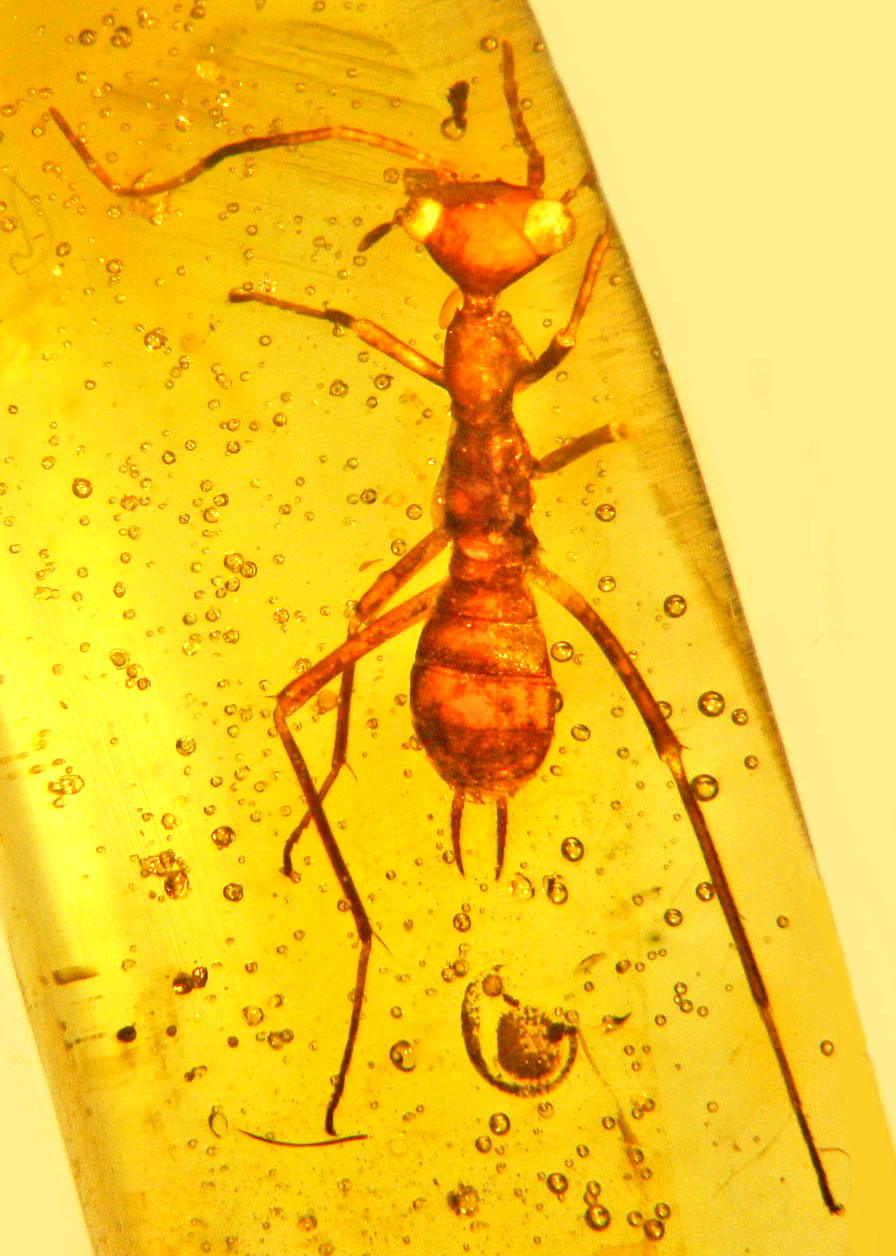
- Specimen in amber

Scientific classification
- Kingdom: Animalia
- Phylum: Arthropoda
- Clade: Pancrustacea
- Class: Insecta
- Family: †Alienopteridae
- Genus: †Aethiocarenus
- Species: †A. burmanicus

Binomial name
- †Aethiocarenus burmanicus Poinar & Brown, 2017

= Aethiocarenus =

Aethiocarenus Temporal range: 99 Ma

Extinct genus of insects

Aethiocarenus is an extinct genus of insects which has a single species Aethiocarenus burmanicus described from a 98.79 ±0.62 million year old fossil found in Burmese amber from the Hukawng Valley of Myanmar. The insect is unusual due to the vertex of the triangular head being attached to the pronotum as opposed to the hypotenuse. When first described Aethiocarenus was placed as the sole member of the family Aethiocarenidae and order Aethiocarenodea. However, Aethiocarenus was later considered to be a nymph of Alienopterus. Vršanský et al. (2018) considered Aethiocarenus to be an alienopterid nymph, but considered it distinct from other members of this group and deserving a separate genus rank.

== Description ==
Aethiocarenus was probably an omnivore and had a long, narrow, flat body, and long slender legs. The eyes are at the sides of the head, allowing the insect to look behind. Glands on the neck indicate that the creature may have emitted chemicals to repel predators.
