= Teyia =

Teyia Temporal range: Cenomanian

Scientific classification
- Kingdom: Animalia
- Phylum: Arthropoda
- Clade: Pancrustacea
- Class: Insecta
- Family: †Alienopteridae
- Genus: †Teyia; Vršanský et al., 2018

Type species
- Teyia branislav Vršanský et al., 2018

Other species
- Teyia huangi Vršanský et al., 2018

Extinct genus of alienopterid insect

Teyia is an extinct genus of alienopterid insect that lived in what is now Myanmar during the Cenomanian stage of the Late Cretaceous epoch.

== Etymology ==
The generic name Teyia derves from the Chinese word teyi, meaning bizarre. The specific epithet of the type species, Teyia branislav, is a stochastic combination of letters, while the specific epithet of the other species in the genus, Teyia huangi, honours Huang Yijen, who collected the type specimen of the species.

== Palaeobiology ==
=== Life history ===
During its nymph stage of life history, Teyia was myrmecomorphous; in other words, it was an ant mimic. In its adult stages, Teyia was a wasp mimic, resembling some taxa of large aculeate hymenopterans.
