= Coptoclavinae =

Scientific classification
- Kingdom: Animalia
- Phylum: Arthropoda
- Clade: Pancrustacea
- Class: Insecta
- Order: Coleoptera
- Suborder: Adephaga
- Family: †Coptoclavidae
- Subfamily: †Coptoclavinae; Ponomarenko, 1961

Genera
- Coptoclavella; Coptoclavisca

Subfamily of beetles

Coptoclavinae is a beetle subfamily in the family Coptoclavidae.
