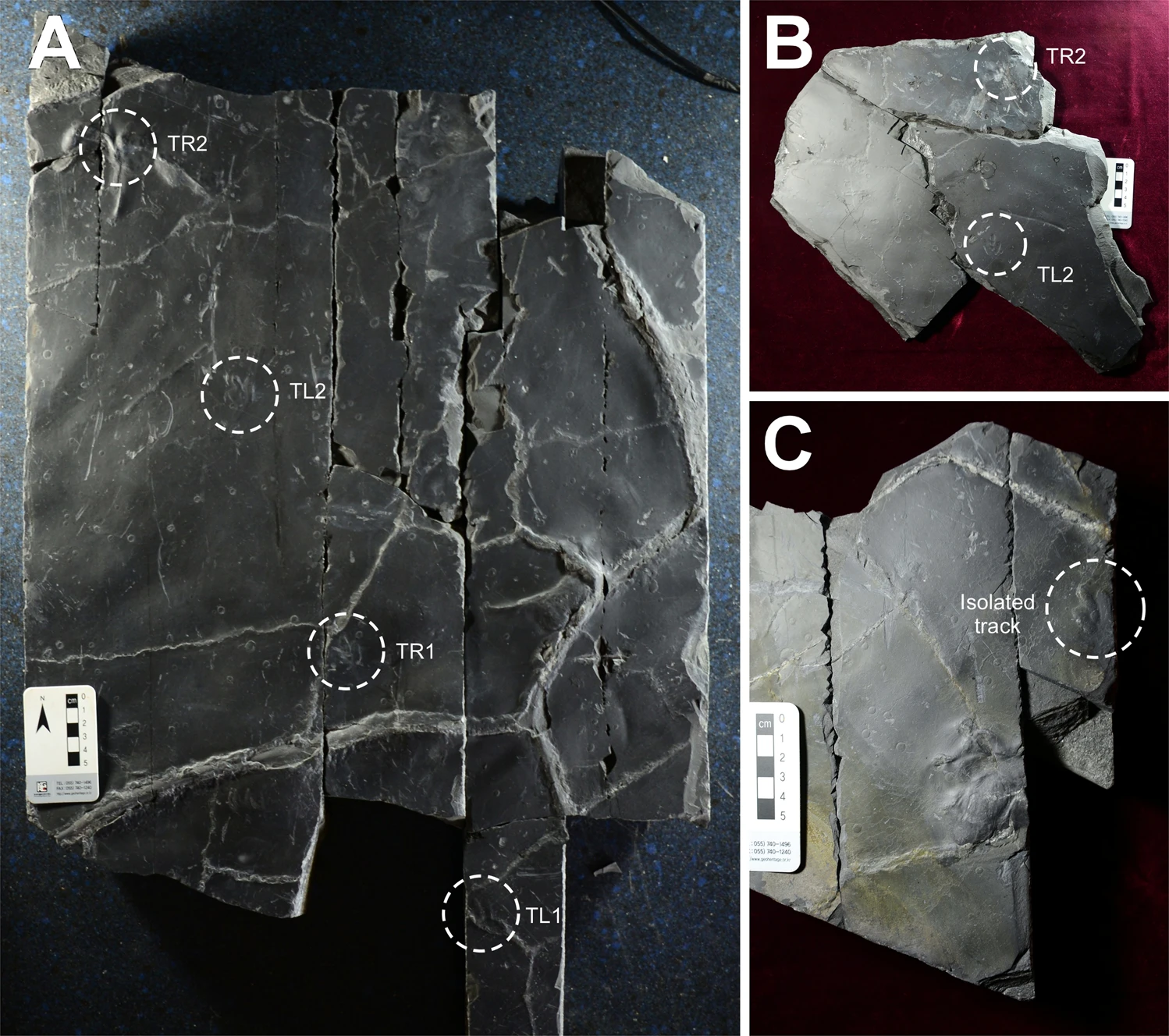
- Minisauripus isp. from Jinju Formation

Trace fossil classification
- Ichnogenus: †Minisauripus; Zhen et al., 1995

Type ichnospecies
- †Minisauripus chuanzhuensis Zhen et al., 1995

Other ichnospecies
- †Minisauripus zhenshuonani Lockley et al., 2008

= Minisauripus =

Minisauripus Temporal range: Barremian–Albian

Dinosaur footprint

Minisauripus is an ichnogenus of theropod dinosaurs from the Early Cretaceous of East Asia. The trackmaker of Minisauripus would have been among the smallest known non-avian dinosaurs. This ichnogenus contains two named ichnospecies from China, M. chuanzhuensis and M. zhenshuonani, with several indeterminate ichnospecies known from China, South Korea and Japan.

== Discovery ==
The type ichnospecies M. chuanzhuensis was first described in 1995 from the Early Cretaceous Jiaguan Formation of Sichuan, China. The second ichnospecies M. zhensuonani was described in 2008 from the Tianjialou Formation (Barremian-Albian) of Shandong, China. Trace fossils from the Haman Formation (Albian) of South Korea were referred to as M. cf. zhenshuonani or M. cf. chuanzhuensis. Other trace fossils attributed to M. isp. were discovered from the Feitianshan Formation of China, the Jinju Formation (Albian) of South Korea and the Kitadani Formation (Aptian) of Japan.

== Classification ==
About 95 tracks have been attributed to Minisauripus, and over 80% of them were less than 3 cm (1.2 in) long. The abundance of such small footprints might suggest that the trackmaker of Minisauripus was a small non-avian theropod, not a juvenile of a larger taxon. The Minisauripus tracks show three distinct toes, unlike the tracks of similar-sized small dromaeosaurids such as Dromaeosauriformipes, which are didactyl, with the recurved claw on the second toe being held off the ground and thus not preserved in the trackway.

== See also ==
- List of dinosaur ichnogenera
