= Jiaguan Formation =

Geologic formation in China

- Stratigraphic range: Barremian–Albian
- Type: Geological formation
- Underlies: Quaternary sediments
- Overlies: Penglaizhen Formation
- Thickness: Around 390 m at the Lotus Fortress locality

Lithology
- Primary: Sandstone, siltstone, mudstone, conglomerate

Location
- Region: Sichuan
- Country: China

The Jiaguan Formation is a Lower Cretaceous geologic formation in China. Its lithology is described as consisting of "alternating thick purple red sandstone layers and thin purple red mudstone and siltstone layers, and bottom layers of thick conglomerate". Fossil ornithopod tracks have been reported from the formation.

The known fossil localities include the Lotus Fortress, the type locality of Caririchnium lotus and Wupus agilis ichnotaxa. One of the smallest known theropod trace fossil Minisauripus chuanzhuensis was first discovered from this formation.

== See also ==
- List of dinosaur-bearing rock formations
  - List of stratigraphic units with ornithischian tracks
    - Ornithopod tracks
