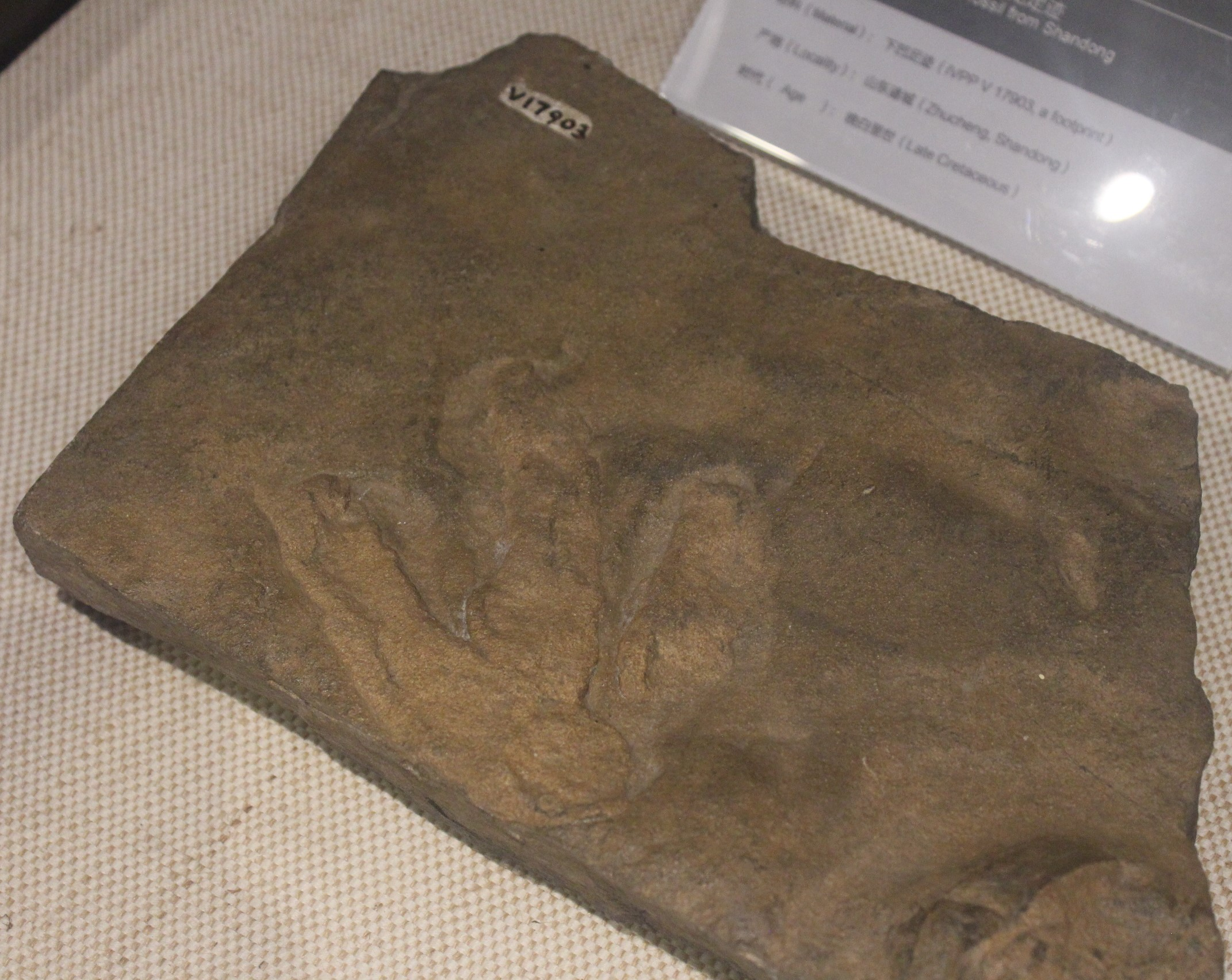
- Fossil of C. lilasia, Paleozoological Museum of China

Trace fossil classification
- Kingdom: Animalia
- Phylum: Chordata
- Class: Reptilia
- Clade: Dinosauria
- Clade: Saurischia
- Clade: Theropoda
- Family: incertae sedis
- Ichnogenus: †Corpulentapus; Li, Lockley, Matsukawa, Wang and Liu, 2011

Type ichnospecies
- †Corpulentapus lilasia Li, Lockley, Matsukawa, Wang and Liu, 2011

= Corpulentapus =

Corpulentapus Temporal range: Early Cretaceous

Trace fossil

Corpulentapus is an ichnogenus of Early Cretaceous theropod tracks known from China and South Korea. The type ichnospecies C. lilasia is known from the Lower Cretaceous Longwangzhuang Formation and Yangjiazhuang Formation in Zhucheng, China, and unnamed ichnospecies is known from the Lower Cretaceous Jinju Formation in Jinju, South Korea.

Corpulentapus is characterized by 'tulip-shaped' robust tridactyl, showing very broad and low-divaricated digits, and short central digit which indicates weak mesaxony. Based on these characteristics, tracks of Corpulentapus show similarities with ornithopod tracks, but asymmetric heel with the trace of metatarsal phalangeal pad IV posterior to metatarsal phalangeal pad II, and long steps represents this ichnotaxon represents theropod trackmaker.
