= Umenocoleidae =

Umenocoleidae Temporal range: Berriasian–Turonian
- Chunxiangus shii holotype

Scientific classification
- Kingdom: Animalia
- Phylum: Arthropoda
- Clade: Pancrustacea
- Class: Insecta
- Superfamily: †Umenocoleoidea
- Family: †Umenocoleidae; Chen and Tan 1973

Genera
- See text

Extinct family of cockroaches

Umenocoleidae is an extinct family of dictyopteran insects known from the Cretaceous. They are considered to be closely related to the Alienopteridae. They were originally considered to be beetles due to their beetle-like morphology, with sclerotised elytra-like forewings. This was probably an adaptation for living under bark and in other tight spaces.

== Systematics ==
After

- †Umenocoleus Chen and Tan 1973 Dalazi Formation, China, Early Cretaceous (Aptian); Zhonggou Formation, China, Early Cretaceous (Albian); Jinju Formation, South Korea, Early Cretaceous (Albian)
- †Ponopterix Vršanský and Grimaldi 1999 Crato Formation, Brazil, Early Cretaceous (Aptian)
- †Blattapterix Vršanský 2003 Xiagou Formation, China, Early Cretaceous (Aptian); Jinju Formation, South Korea, Early Cretaceous (Albian)
- †Elytropterix Vršanský 2003 Dzun-Bain Formation, Mongolia, Aptian
- †Petropterix Vršanský 2003 Dzun-Bain Formation, Mongolia; Zaza Formation, Russia; Kitadani Formation, Japan, Early Cretaceous (Aptian); Zhonggou Formation, China, Early Cretaceous (Albian); Jinju Formation, South Korea, Early Cretaceous (Albian)
- †Compunctiotypus Kaddumi 2005 Jordanian amber, Early Cretaceous (Albian)
- †Umenopterix Lee 2016 Crato Formation, Brazil, Early Cretaceous (Aptian) Burmese amber, Myanmar, mid-Cretaceous (latest Albian-earliest Cenomanian)
- †Alienopterix Mlynský, Vršanský et Wang, 2018 Burmese amber, Myanmar, mid-Cretaceous (latest Albian-earliest Cenomanian)
- †Enervipraeala Luo, Xu et Jarzembowski, 2021 Burmese amber, Myanmar, mid-Cretaceous (latest Albian-earliest Cenomanian)
- †Laticephalana Luo, Beutel, Xu et Jarzembowski, 2021 Burmese amber, Myanmar, mid-Cretaceous (latest Albian-earliest Cenomanian)
- †Archaeospinapteryx Sendi et al. 2023 Burmese amber, Myanmar, mid-Cretaceous (latest Albian-earliest Cenomanian)
- †Trapezionotum Sendi et al. 2023 Burmese amber, Myanmar, mid-Cretaceous (latest Albian-earliest Cenomanian)
- †Poikiloprosopon Sendi et al. 2023 Burmese amber, Myanmar, mid-Cretaceous (latest Albian-earliest Cenomanian)
- †?Vzrkadlenie Burmese amber, Myanmar, mid Cretaceous (latest Albian-earliest Cenomanian) (Also placed in Alienopteridae or Cratovitismidae)
- †Nigropterix Sendi et al. 2023 Kzyl-Zhar, Kazakhstan, Late Cretaceous (Turonian); Burmese amber, Myanmar, mid-Cretaceous (latest Albian-earliest Cenomanian)
- †Umenotypus Sendi et al. 2023 Kzyl-Zhar, Kazakhstan, Late Cretaceous (Turonian)
- †Pseudoblattapterix Lee et al. 2024 Jinju Formation, South Korea, Early Cretaceous (Albian)
- †Chunxiangus Luo et al. 2025 Burmese amber, Myanmar, mid-Cretaceous (latest Albian-earliest Cenomanian)

Jantaropterix Vršanský and Grimaldi 2003, Perspicuus Koubová, 2020, Lepidopterix Sendi, 2020 and Antophiloblatta Sendi, 2020 have been transferred to Cratovitismidae, while Vitisma Vršanský 1999 and Permoponopterix Nel, Prokop et Kirejtshuk, 2014 have been excluded from the family.
