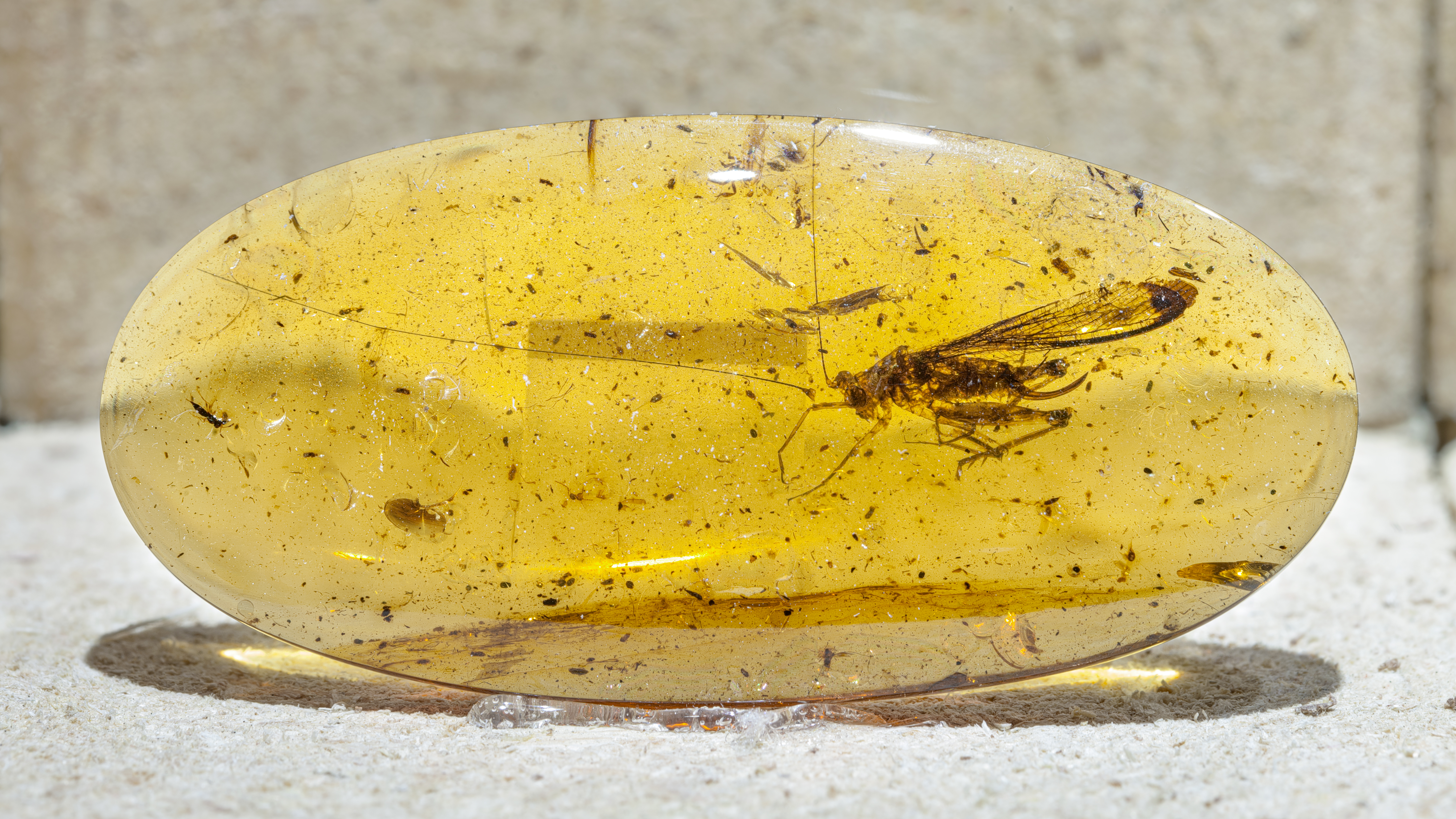

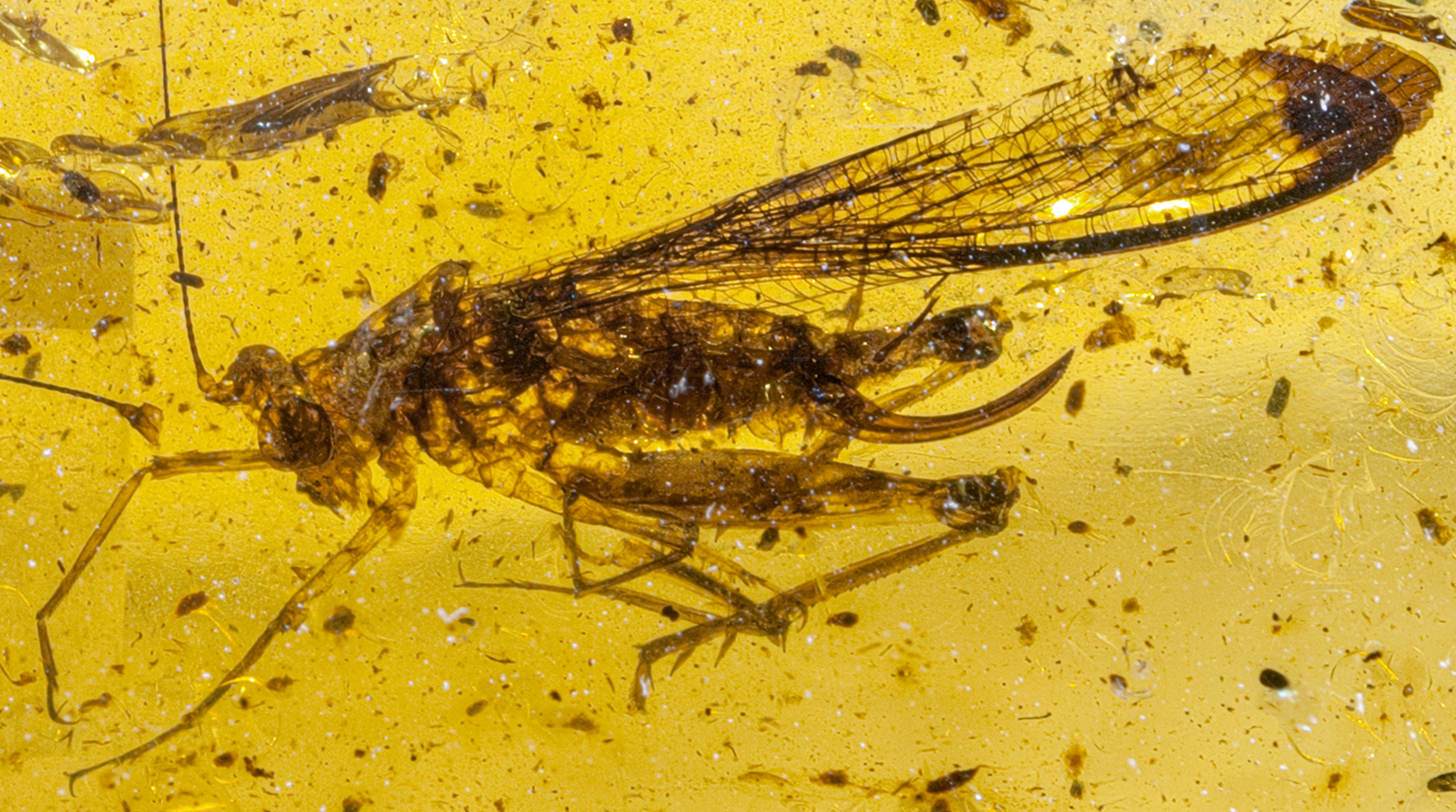
- Unidentified female elcanid included in Burmese amber, showing metatibial spurs

Scientific classification
- Kingdom: Animalia
- Phylum: Arthropoda
- Clade: Pancrustacea
- Class: Insecta
- Order: Orthoptera
- Superfamily: †Elcanoidea
- Family: †Elcanidae; Handlirsch, 1906

Type genus
- Elcana Giebel, 1856 [synonym of Panorpidium]

Subfamilies and genera
- See text

= Elcanidae =

Elcanidae Temporal range: Norian–Paleocene

Extinct family of cricket-like animals

Elcanidae are an extinct family of Mesozoic and early Cenozoic orthopterans. Members of the family are distinguished by the presence of spurs on the distal part of the metatibia, unique among orthopterans, these have been suggested to have been used for controlling gliding, swimming aids, or for jumping on water. The group combines characteristics from both major groups of orthopterans, with long antennae and nymphal morphology similar to Ensifera, but with wing venation and adult morphology more similar to Caelifera. Elcanidae is part of Elcanoidea, which is thought to have diverged from living orthopterans by the beginning of the Permian, around 300 million years ago. The family also includes Permelcanidae, known from the Early-Late Permian. The relationship of Elcanoidea to Ensifera and Caelifera is currently unresolved. Elcanids are known from the Late Triassic to Paleocene of Eurasia, North and South America. Some members of the group exhibited aposematic coloration. They are thought to have been herbivorous.

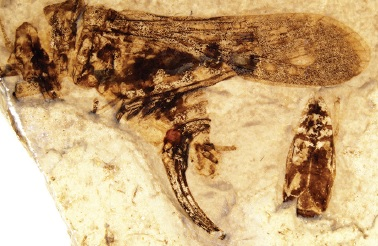
Sinoelcana minuta Jurassic, China

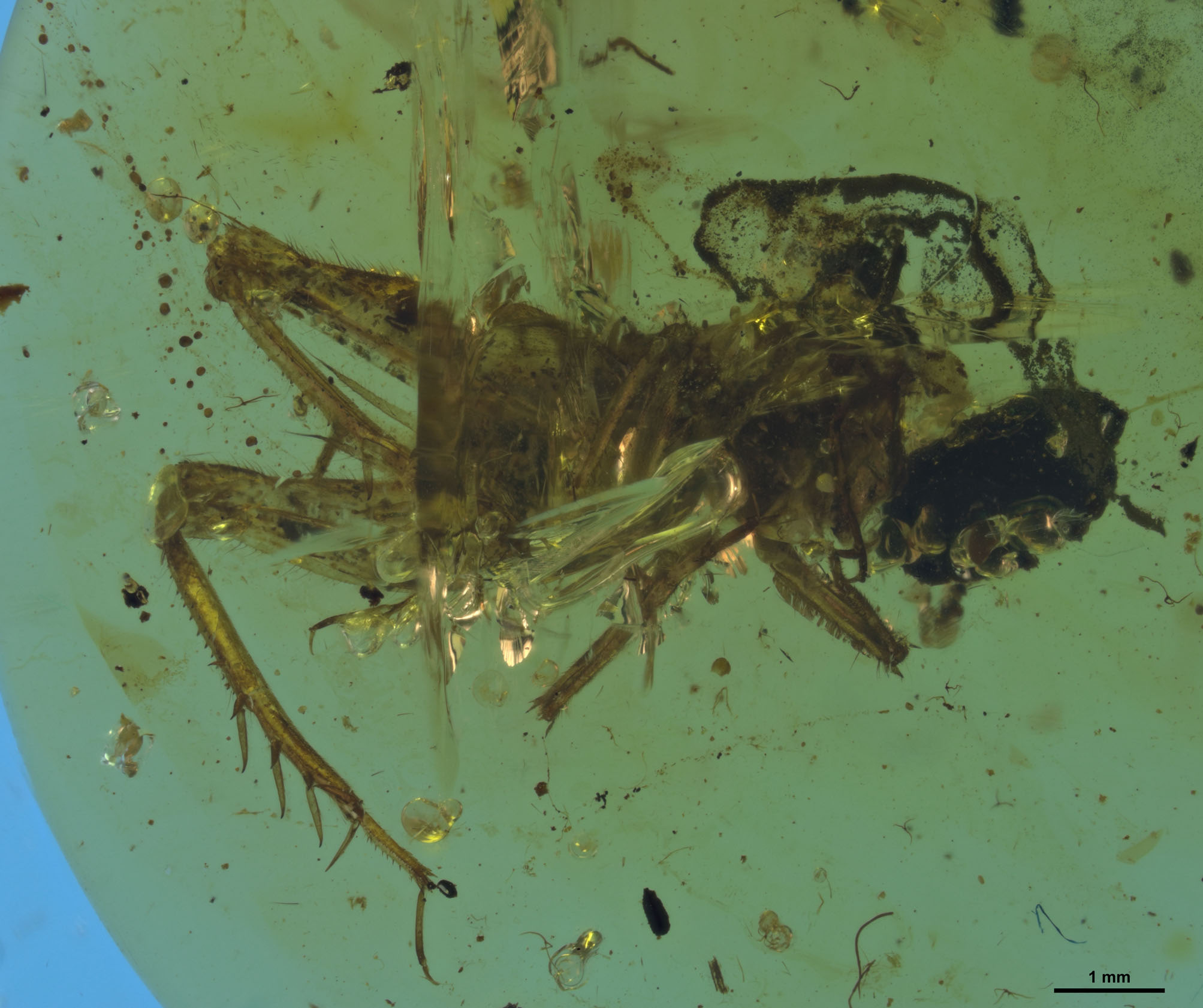
Elcanonympha diana nymph

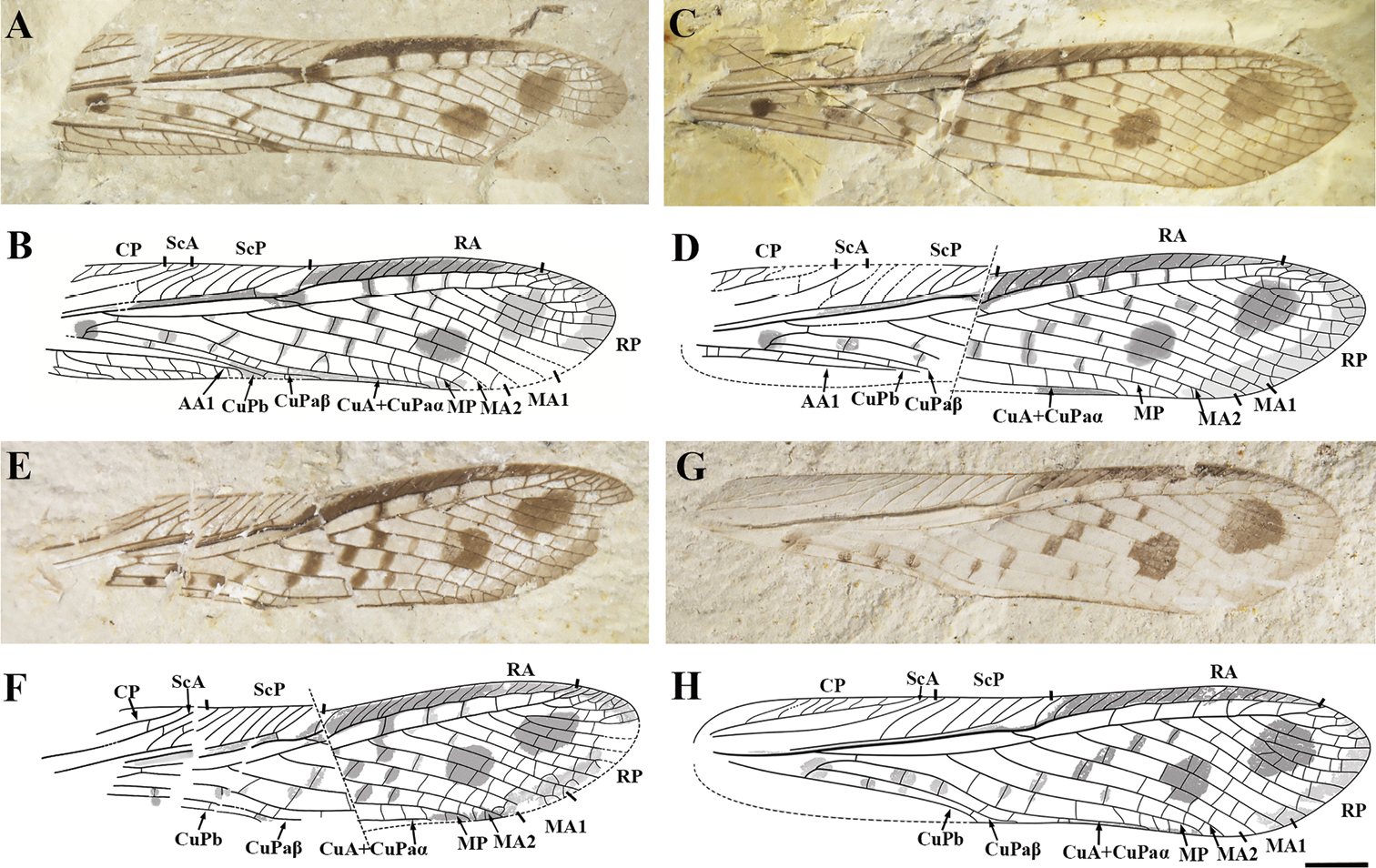
Wings of Parelcana pulchmacula

== Taxonomy ==
- subfamily Archelcaninae Gorochov, 2011
  - Archelcana Sharov, 1968
    - Archelcana durnovaria Whalley, 1985 – Charmouth Mudstone Formation, England, Early Jurassic (Sinemurian)
    - Archelcana ornata Zherikhin, 1985 – Cheremkhovskaya Formation, Russia, Early Jurassic (Toarcian)
    - Archelcana shurabica Sharov, 1968 – Sagul Formation, Kyrgyzstan, Toarcian
    - Indeterminate remains attributed to the genus are also known from the latest Triassic of Germany
  - Jeholelcana Fang et al. 2018b
    - Jeholelcana yanensis Fang et al. 2018b – Yixian Formation, China, Early Cretaceous (Aptian)
  - Parelcana Handlirsch, 1906
    - Parelcana anglicana Handlirsch, 1939 – Blue Lias, United Kingdom, Early Jurassic (Hettangian)
    - Parelcana dubia Handlirsch, 1939 – United Kingdom, Late Triassic (Rhaetian)
    - Parelcana pulchmacula Tian et al., 2019 – Daohugou, China, Middle Jurassic (Callovian)
    - Parelcana tenuis Handlirsch, 1906 – Green Series, Germany, Toarcian
  - Sibelcana Gorochov, 1990
    - Sibelcana rossica Gorochov, 1990 – Glushkovo Formation, Russia, Late Jurassic (Tithonian)
    - Sibelcana transbaicalica Gorochov, 1990 – Ukurei Formation, Russia, Tithonian
  - Synelcana Zessin, 1988
    - Synelcana muelleri Zessin, 1988 – Green Series, Germany, Toarcian
- subfamily Elcaninae Handlirsch, 1906
  - Cratoelcana Martins-Neto, 1991 – Crato Formation, Brazil, Aptian
    - Cratoelcana damianii Martins-Neto, 1991
    - Cratoelcana zessini Martins-Neto, 1991
  - Ellca Kočárek, 2020
    - Ellca nevelka Kočárek, 2020 – Burmese amber, Myanmar, Late Cretaceous (Cenomanian)
  - Eubaisselcana Gorochov, 1986 – Gurvan-Eren Formation, Mongolia, Aptian
    - Eubaisselcana mongolica Gorochov, 1986
    - Eubaisselcana sharovi Gorochov, 1986
  - Minelcana Gorochov et al., 2006
    - Minelcana dubia (Giebel 1856) – Lulworth Formation, United Kingdom, Early Cretaceous (Berriasian)
    - Minelcana membranacea Gorochov et al., 2006 – Durlston Formation, United Kingdom, Berriasian
  - Panorpidium Westwood, 1854
    - Panorpidium bimaculatum Gorochov et al., 2006 – Weald Clay, United Kingdom, Early Cretaceous (Barremian)
    - Panorpidium maculosum Zhou et al. 2022 Burmese amber, Myanmar, Cenomanian
    - Panorpidium proximum Gorochov et al., 2006 – Durlston Formation, United Kingdom, Berriasian
    - Panorpidium parvum Gorochov et al., 2006 – Weald Clay, United Kingdom, Early Cretaceous (Hauterivian)
    - Panorpidium sibirica Sharov, 1968 – Zaza Formation, Russia, Aptian
    - Panorpidium spica Kim et al., 2021 – Jinju Formation, South Korea, Early Cretaceous (Albian)
    - Panorpidium tessellatum Westwood, 1854 – Durlston Formation, United Kingdom, Berriasian
    - Panorpidium yixianensis Fang et al., 2015 – Yixian Formation, China, Aptian
  - Probaisselcana Gorochov, 1989
    - Probaisselcana cretacea Gorochov et al., 2006 – Weald Clay, United Kingdom, Hauterivian
    - Probaisselcana euryptera Tian et al., 2019 – Yixian Formation, China, Aptian
    - Probaisselcana karatavica Sharov, 1968 – Karabastau Formation, Kazakhstan, Late Jurassic (Oxfordian)
    - Probaisselcana oculata Hu & He, 2023 - Burmese amber, Myanmar, Cenomanian
- Incertae sedis
  - Burmelcana Peñalver & Grimaldi, 2010
    - Burmelcana longirostris Peñalver & Grimaldi, 2010 – Burmese amber, Myanmar, Cenomanian
  - Cascadelcana Fang et al., 2018a
    - Cascadelcana virginiana Fang et al., 2018a – Cow Branch Formation, North Carolina, Late Triassic (Norian)
  - Cenoelcanus Schubnel et al., 2020
    - Cenoelcanus menatensis Schubnel et al., 2020 – Menat Formation, France, Paleocene
  - Elcanonympha Heads et al., 2018
    - Elcanonympha diana Heads et al., 2018 – Burmese amber, Myanmar, Cenomanian
  - Hispanelcana Peñalver & Grimaldi, 2010 – Álava amber, Escucha Formation, Spain, Albian
    - Hispanelcana alavensis Peñalver & Grimaldi, 2010
    - Hispanelcana arilloi Peñalver & Grimaldi, 2010
    - Hispanelcana lopezvallei Peñalver & Grimaldi, 2010
  - Longioculus Poinar et al., 2007
    - Longioculus burmensis Poinar et al., 2007 – Burmese amber, Myanmar, Cenomanian
  - Hukawnelca Uchida, 2021
    - Hukawnelca gracile Uchida, 2021 – Burmese amber, Myanmar, Cenomanian
  - Caelielca Uchida, 2021
    - Caelielca spinocrus Uchida, 2021 – Burmese amber, Myanmar, Cenomanian
  - Monitelcana Xu et al., 2022
    - Monitelcana penalveri Xu et al., 2022 – Burmese amber, Myanmar, Cenomanian
