= Hispanoclavina =

Hispanoclavina Temporal range: Barremian

Scientific classification
- Domain: Eukaryota
- Kingdom: Animalia
- Phylum: Arthropoda
- Class: Insecta
- Order: Coleoptera
- Suborder: Adephaga
- Family: †Coptoclavidae
- Subfamily: †Hispanoclavinae; Soriano, Ponomarenko & Delclos, 2007
- Genus: †Hispanoclavina; Soriano, Ponomarenko & Delclos, 2007

Species
- †H. diazromerali Soriano, Ponomarenko & Delclos, 2007; †H. gratshevi Soriano, Ponomarenko & Delclos, 2007

Extinct genus of beetles

Hispanoclavina is an extinct genus of beetles in the family Coptoclavidae that lived in the Barremian age of the Early Cretaceous of Spain, and is the only member of the subfamily Hispanoclavinae. It consists of two species, H. diazromerali and H. gratshevi, which were described from fossils found in Las Hoyas, a Konservat-Lagerstätten within the La Huérguina Formation near Cuenca, Spain. Unlike most members of the family Coptoclavidae, which are interpreted as active hunters, Hispanoclavina is considered to have been a filter feeder, with forelegs adapted for filtering plankton.
