= Coptoclavella =

Coptoclavella Temporal range: Callovian–Aptian

Scientific classification
- Domain: Eukaryota
- Kingdom: Animalia
- Phylum: Arthropoda
- Class: Insecta
- Order: Coleoptera
- Suborder: Adephaga
- Family: †Coptoclavidae
- Subfamily: †Coptoclavinae
- Genus: †Coptoclavella; Ponomarenko, 1980

Genus of beetles

Coptoclavella is an extinct genus of beetles in the family Coptoclavidae. There are about seven described species in Coptoclavella.

== Species ==
These seven species belong to the genus Coptoclavella:

- † Coptoclavella elegans Ponomarenko, 1980 – Mogotuin Formation, Mongolia, Aptian
- † Coptoclavella inexpecta Soriano et al., 2007 – La Pedrera de Rúbies Formation, Spain, Barremian
- † Coptoclavella jurassica Ponomarenko, 2014 – Sharteg, Mongolia, Tithonian
- † Coptoclavella minor Ponomarenko, 1980 – Takshin Formation, Kalgan Formation Russia, Callovian; Daya Formation, Russia, Hauterivian; Mogotuin Formation, Mongolia, Aptian; Turga Formation, Russia, Aptian
- † Coptoclavella purbeckensis Ponomarenko et al., 2005 – Durlston Formation, United Kingdom, Berriasian
- † Coptoclavella striata Ponomarenko, 1986 – Gurvan-Eren Formation, Mongolia, Aptian
- † Coptoclavella vittata Ponomarenko, 1986 – Gurvan-Eren Formation, Mongolia, Aptian
