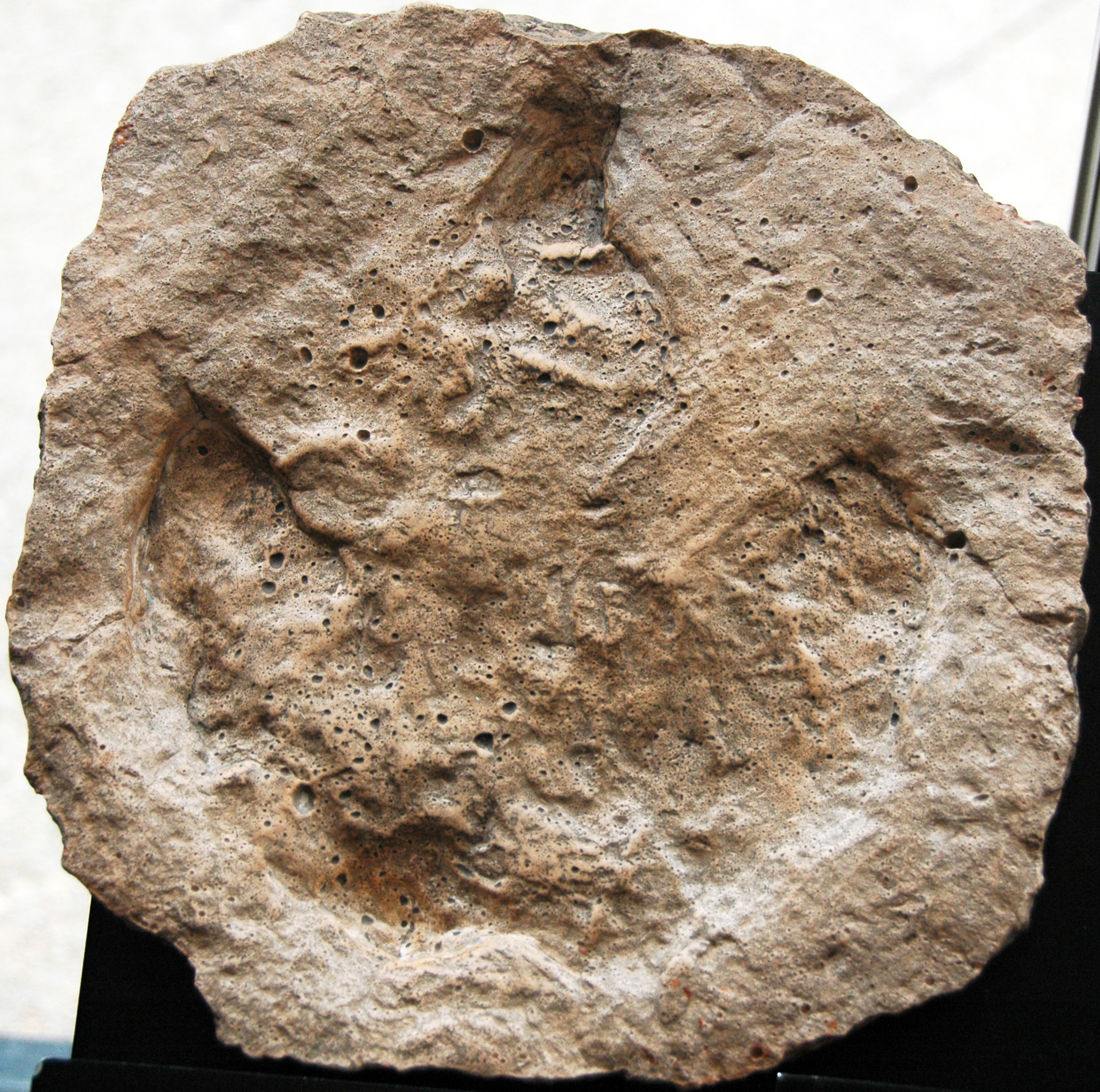
- C. leonardii specimen from Dinosaur Ridge, Colorado

Trace fossil classification
- Kingdom: Animalia
- Phylum: Chordata
- Class: Reptilia
- Clade: Dinosauria
- Clade: †Ornithischia
- Clade: †Ornithopoda
- Ichnofamily: †Iguanodontipodidae
- Ichnogenus: †Caririchnium; Leonardi, 1984

= Caririchnium =

Dinosaur footprint

Caririchnium is an ichnogenus of ornithopod dinosaur footprint, belonging to either derived iguanodonts or basal hadrosauroids. It includes the species Caririchnium lotus from Lower Cretaceous Jiaguan Formation and C. protohadrosaurichnos from Upper Cretaceous Woodbine Formation. Specimens are also known from the Lower Cretaceous El Castellar Formation and Camarillas Formations.

The trackmaker was probably a large styracosternan related to Iguanodon.

== See also ==
- List of dinosaur ichnogenera
