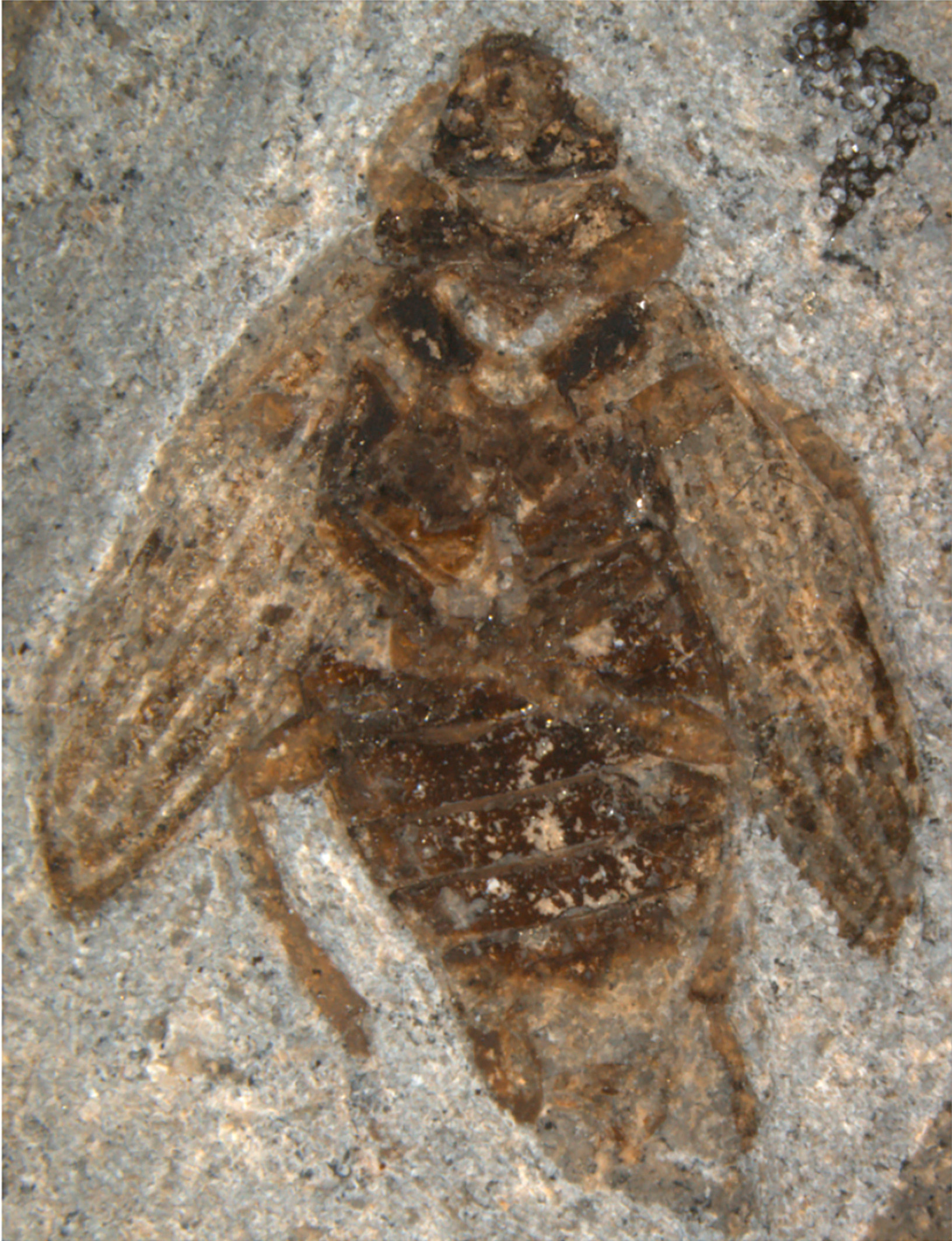
- Holcoptera giebeli (specimen NMHUK PI II.3101)
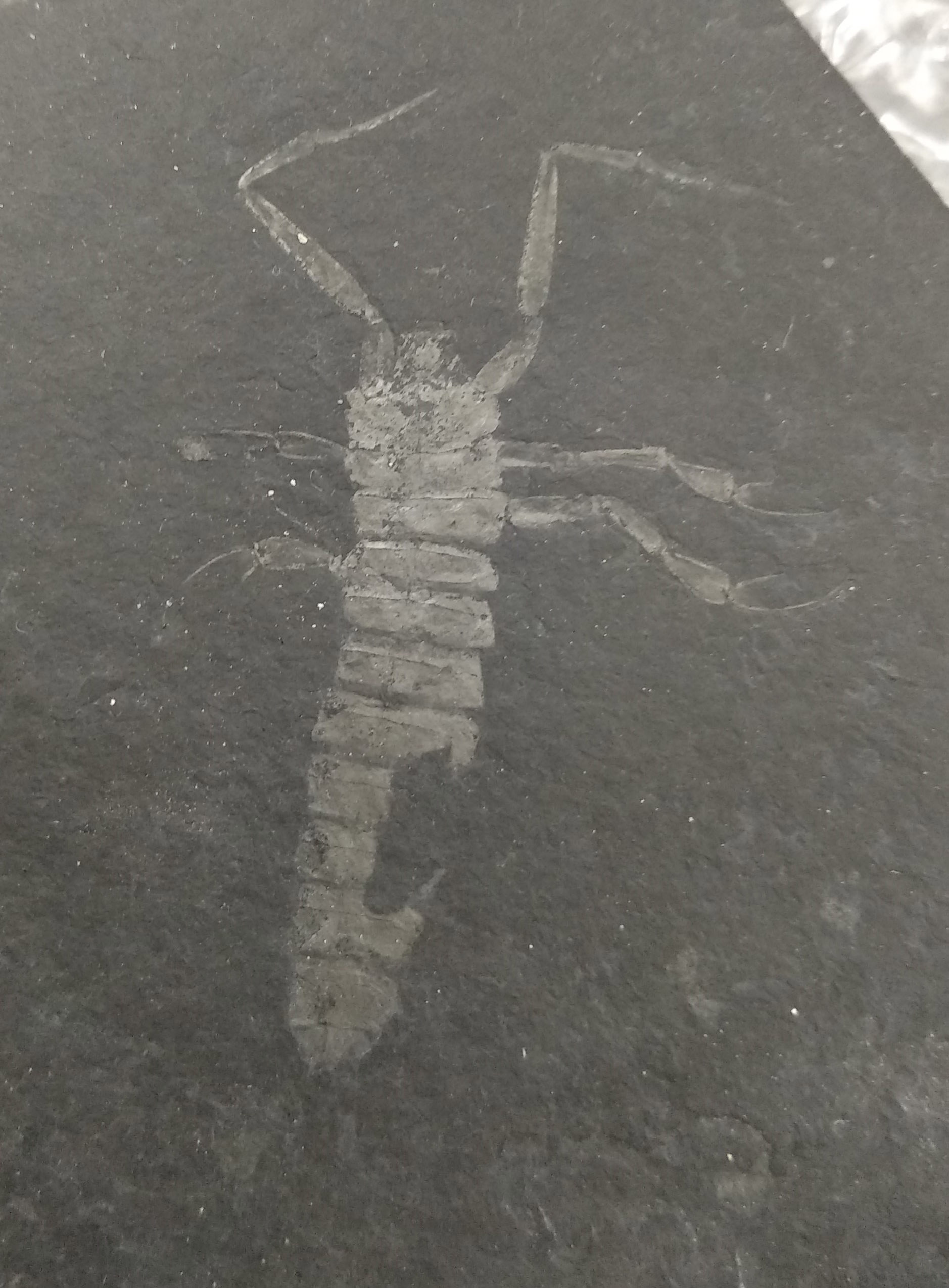
- Larva of Coptoclava from the Jinju Formation

Scientific classification
- Kingdom: Animalia
- Phylum: Arthropoda
- Class: Insecta
- Order: Coleoptera
- Suborder: Adephaga
- Family: †Coptoclavidae; Ponomarenko, 1961

Subfamilies
- Charonoscaphinae; Coptoclavinae; Coptoclaviscinae; Hispanoclavinae; Timarchopsinae; Coptoclavidae (incertae sedis)

= Coptoclavidae =

Coptoclavidae Temporal range: Late Triassic–Early Cretaceous

Extinct family of beetles

Coptoclavidae is an extinct family of aquatic beetles in the suborder Adephaga. The Coptoclavidae lived from the Late Triassic to the Early Cretaceous. Coptoclavidae is a member of the adephagan clade Dytiscoidea, which contains living aquatic beetles, including living predatory diving beetles (Dytiscidae). Coptoclavids are thought to have hunted on the water surface, similar to whirligig beetles (Gyrinidiae), with prey likely including small fish and larval amphibians. Suggested reasons for their extinction to include the rise of teleost fish, or competition with Gyrinidae and Dytiscidae, which possess defensive secretions and sucking channels in the mandibles of larvae, which coptoclavids likely lacked. It has been suggested that the genus Timarchopsis and the subfamily Timarchopsinae are only distantly related to other coptoclavids based on cladistic analysis, with Timarchopsis being more closely related to geadephagans like carabids and trachypachids instead. Another study also suggested similarly for Coptoclavisca and possibly other coptoclaviscines. A 2025 study suggested that Coptoclavidae as a whole, as well as most of the major subfamilies, were likely not monophyletic, but represent a number of separate lineages of dytiscoid beetles.

== Taxonomy ==
- †Agrascapha Lin, 1992 – Huangshanjie Formation, China, Carnian
- †Amblycephalonius Bode, 1953 – Posidonia Shale, Germany, Toarcian
- subfamily †Charonoscaphinae Ponomarenko, 1977
  - †Charonoscapha Ponomarenko, 1977 – Karabastau Formation, Kazakhstan, Callovian
  - †Charonoscaphidia Ponomarenko, 1977 – Karabastau Formation, Kazakhstan, Callovian
- †Coptoclavia Ping, 1928 – Cassange Group, Upper Triassic
- subfamily †Coptoclavinae Ponomarenko, 1961
  - †Bolbonectes Ponomarenko, 1987
    - †Bolbonectes intermedius Ponomarenko, 1987 – Byankino Formation, Russia, Tithonian; Leskovskaya Formation, Russia, Barremian
    - †Bolbonectes occidentalis Ponomarenko, 1993 – Ichetuy Formation, Russia, Oxfordian
    - †Bolbonectus lithographicus Ponomarenko and Martínez-Delclòs, 2000 – La Pedrera de Rúbies Formation, Spain, Barremian
  - †Coptoclava Ping, 1928 – Ustkarskaya Formation, Russia, Hauterivian; Dabeigou Formation, China, Hauterivian; Kutinskaya Formation, Russia, Barremian; Dalazi Formation, Laiyang Formation, Jianchang Formation, Shouchang Formation, Jiufotang Formation, Chijinbao Formation, Aptian; Zaza Formation, Gidarinskaya Formation, Mangutskaya Formation, Turga Formation, Russia, Aptian, Jinju Formation, South Korea, Albian
  - †Hoyaclava Soriano et al., 2007 – Las Hoyas, Spain, Barremian
  - †Megacoptoclava Ponomarenko and Martínez-Delclòs, 2000 – Las Hoyas, Spain, Barremian
- subfamily †Coptoclaviscinae Soriano et al., 2007
  - †Coptoclavella Ponomarenko, 1980
    - †Coptoclavella elegans Ponomarenko, 1980 – Mogotuin Formation, Mongolia, Aptian
    - †Coptoclavella inexpecta Soriano et al., 2007 – La Pedrera de Rúbies Formation, Spain, Barremian
    - †Coptoclavella jurassica Ponomarenko, 2014 – Sharteg, Mongolia, Tithonian
    - †Coptoclavella minor Ponomarenko, 1980 – Takshin Formation, Kalgan Formation Russia, Callovian; Daya Formation, Russia, Hauterivian; Mogotuin Formation, Mongolia, Aptian; Turga Formation, Russia, Aptian
    - †Coptoclavella purbeckensis Ponomarenko et al., 2005 – Durlston Formation, United Kingdom, Berriasian
    - †Coptoclavella vittata Ponomarenko, 1986 – Gurvan-Eren Formation, Mongolia, Aptian
    - †Coptoclavella striata Ponomarenko, 1986 – Gurvan-Eren Formation, Mongolia, Aptian
  - †Coptoclavisca Ponomarenko, 1987 – Laiyang Formation, China, Aptian; Tsagaantsav Formation, Mongolia, Early Cretaceous
  - †Holcoptera Handlirsch, 1906 (= Stargelytron Ponomarenko, 2015)
    - †Holcoptera alisonae Kelly et al., 2017 – Charmouth Mudstone Formation, United Kingdom, Sinemurian
    - †Holcoptera altus (Ponomarenko, 2015) (= Stargelytron altus Ponomarenko, 2015) – Röt Formation, Germany, Anisian
    - †Holcoptera giebeli Handlirsch, 1906 – Lilstock Formation, United Kingdom, Rhaetian; Charmouth Mudstone Formation, United Kingdom, Sinemurian
    - †Holcoptera larissae (Ponomarenko, 2015) (= Stargelytron larissae Ponomarenko, 2015) – Hassberge Formation, Germany, Carnian
    - †Holcoptera pigmentatus Kelly et al., 2017 – Lilstock Formation, United Kingdom, Rhaetian; Portland Formation, Connecticut, Hettangian; Mount Toby Formation, Massachusetts, Hettangian
    - †Holcoptera rasnitsyni Ponomarenko and Fedorenko, 2022 – Protopivka Formation, Ukraine, Norian
    - †Holcoptera schlotheimi (Giebel, 1856) (=Holcoptera confluens Cockerell, 1915) – Argilliti di Riva di Solto Formation, Italy, Norian; Lilstock Formation, United Kingdom, Rhaetian; Blue Lias, United Kingdom, Hettangian; Portland Formation, Connecticut, Hettangian
    - †Holcoptera solitensis Kelly et al., 2017 – Cow Branch Formation, North Carolina, Norian
- †Euroscapha Lin, 1992 – Huangshanjie Formation, China, Carnian
- subfamily †Hispanoclavinae Soriano et al., 2007
  - †Hispanoclavina Soriano et al., 2007 – Las Hoyas, Spain, Barremian
- subfamily †Timarchopsinae Wang et al., 2010
  - †Actea Germar, 1842 – Solnhofen, Germany, Tithonian
  - †Daohugounectes Wang et al., 2009 – Daohugou, China, Callovian
  - †Ditomoptera Germar, 1839 – Solnhofen, Germany, Tithonian
  - †Exedia Ponomarenko, 1977 – Karabastau Formation, Kazakhstan, Callovian
  - †Ovonectes Soriano et al., 2007 – Las Hoyas, Spain, Barremian
  - †Protonectes Prokin and Ponomarenko, 2013 – Hassberge Formation, Germany, Carnian
  - †Pseudohydrophilus Deichmüller, 1886 – Solnhofen, Germany, Tithonian
  - †Stygeonectes Ponomarenko, 1977 – Cheremkhovskaya Formation, Russia, Toarcian; Udinskaya Formation, Russia, Callovian; Uda Formation, Ichetuy Formation, Russia, Oxfordian; Glushkovo Formation, Russia, Tithonian; Leskovskaya Formation, Bukachacha Formation, Russia, Barremian; Godymboyskaya Formation, Turga Formation, Russia, Aptian
  - †Timarchopsis Brauer et al., 1889
    - †Timarchopsis aquaticus Ponomarenko, 1977 – Cheremkhovskaya Formation, Russia, Toarcian; Ichetuy Formation, Russia, Oxfordian
    - †Timarchopsis cyrenaicus Ponomarenko, 1977 – Algeria, Hauterivian
    - †Timarchopsis czekanowskii Brauer et al., 1889 – Cheremkhovskaya Formation, Russia, Toarcian
    - †Timarchopsis gigas Ponomarenko, 1977 – Karabastau Formation, Kazakhstan, Callovian
    - †Timarchopsis gobiensis Ponomarenko, 1987 – Ulaan-Ereg Formation, Mongolia, Tithonian
    - †Timarchopsis latus Ponomarenko, 1977 – Sagul Formation, Kyrgyzstan, Toarcian
    - †Timarchopsis longus Ponomarenko, 2014 – Sharteg, Mongolia, Tithonian
    - †Timarchopsis mongolicus Ponomarenko, 1985 – Zhargalant Formation, Mongolia, Bathonian
    - †Timarchopsis sainshandensis Ponomarenko, 1987 – Khamarkhoburinskaya Formation, Mongolia, Aalenian
  - †Tuhanectes Hong, 1995 – Sanjianfang Formation, China, Bathonian
