= Dromaeosauripus =

Dromaeosauripus Temporal range: Hauterivian–Albian

Trace fossil classification
- Ichnogenus: Dromaeosauripus; Kim et al., 2008

Type ichnospecies
- Dromaeosauripus hamanensis Kim et al., 2008

Other ichnospecies
- Dromaeosauripus jinjuensis Kim et al., 2012; Dromaeosauripus yongjingensis Xing et al., 2013

Dinosaur footprint

Dromaeosauripus is an ichnogenus of probable dromaeosaurid theropod dinosaurs from the Early Cretaceous of Asia and North America. First discovered in South Korea, probable dromaeosaurid footprints described as Dromaeosauripus have been also found in China and the United States. This ichnogenus contains three named ichnospecies from South Korea and China: D. hamanensis (the type ichnospecies), D. jinjuensis and D. yongjingensis.

== Discovery ==
The ichnogenus Dromaeosauripus, meaning "tracks of a dromaeosaurid", was first named in 2008, with the type ichnospecies D. hamanensis named in reference to its type locality: the Haman Formation (Albian) of South Korea. In 2012, the second ichnospecies D. jinjuensis was described from the Jinju Formation (Albian) of South Korea. In 2013, the third ichnospecies D. yongjingensis was described from the Yanguoxia Formation (Hauterivian-Aptian) of Hekou Group in China. Other trace fossils attributed to D. isp. were known from the Aptian-Albian strata in the United States, specifically the South Platte Formation of Colorado and the upper Cedar Mountain Formation of Utah.

== Classification ==
Dromaeosauripus was described as a probable dromaeosaurid trace fossil, and the describers of D. yongjingensis included this ichnogenus within the ichnofamily Dromaeopodidae. In 2024, the describers of Fujianipus yingliangi amended the ichnofamily Dromaeopodidae as the ichnosubfamily Dromaeopodinae under their newly erected ichnofamily Deinonychosauripodidae.

== See also ==
- List of dinosaur ichnogenera
- Ichnology
