= Panorpidium =

Scientific classification
- Kingdom: Animalia
- Phylum: Arthropoda
- Clade: Pancrustacea
- Class: Insecta
- Order: Orthoptera
- Family: †Elcanidae
- Subfamily: †Elcaninae
- Genus: †Panorpidium; Westwood, 1854

Extinct genus of insect

Panorpidium is an extinct genus of orthopteran insect within the Elcanidae family, described by Westwood in 1854.

The genus consists of the following species:

- †Panorpidium acusicaudum Tian et al., 2022
- †Panorpidium angustior Handlirsch, 1939
- †Panorpidium beyrichi Giebel, 1856
- †Panorpidium bimaculatum Gorochov et al., 2006
- †Panorpidium deichmuelleri Handlirsch, 1906
- †Panorpidium geinitzi Heer, 1880
- †Panorpidium lata Sharov, 1968
- †Panorpidium liasinum Giebel, 1856
- †Panorpidium lithophilum Germar, 1842
- †Panorpidium longicorne Handlirsch, 1906
- †Panorpidium longirostris Penalver & Grimaldi, 2010
- †Panorpidium maculosum Zhou et al. 2022
- †Panorpidium magnum Handlirsch, 1906
- †Panorpidium medium Handlirsch, 1906
- †Panorpidium mesostenum Handlirsch, 1939
- †Panorpidium minimum Handlirsch, 1906
- †Panorpidium minutum Sharov, 1968
- †Panorpidium oppenheimi Handlirsch, 1906
- †Panorpidium parvum Gorochov et al., 2006
- †Panorpidium phyllophorum Handlirsch, 1906
- †Panorpidium plagiatus Hagen, 1858
- †Panorpidium proximum Gorochov et al., 2006
- †Panorpidium sibiricum Sharov, 1968
- †Panorpidium spica Kim et al., 2021
- †Panorpidium tessellatum Westwood, 1854
- †Panorpidium validum Tian et al., 2022
- †Panorpidium westwoodi Handlirsch, 1906
- †Panorpidium yixianensis Fang et al., 2015
