= Caputoraptor =

Caputoraptor Temporal range: Albian–Cenomanian

Scientific classification
- Domain: Eukaryota
- Kingdom: Animalia
- Phylum: Arthropoda
- Class: Insecta
- Family: †Alienopteridae
- Genus: †Caputoraptor; Bai et al., 2018

Type species
- †Caputoraptor elegans Bai et al., 2018

Other species
- †C. vidit Šmídová, Vršanský & Wang in Vršanský et al. (2018); †C. ganggu Vršanský et al., 2025

Extinct genus of insects

Caputoraptor is an extinct genus of insect from the Cretaceous period of Southeast Asia and East Asia. The genus contains two species from the Burmese amber (Cenomanian) of Myanmar, the type species C. elegans and the second species C. vidit, and one species from the Jinju Formation (Albian) of South Korea, C. ganggu. It is part of the extinct order Alienoptera. C. elegans is notable for the presence of a scissor like mechanism consisting of a straight edge on the back of the head and corresponding serrated edges on the first thoracic segment, these were initially suggested to be used by the female to grasp the male during mating, but the structure is not sexually dimorphic, so a use to hold prey was subsequently suggested. Its morphology suggests a predatory habit inhabiting shrubs and trees. In 2020 a Caputoraptor elegans nymph was described that was in the process of being predated upon by a Ceratomyrmex hell ant.
