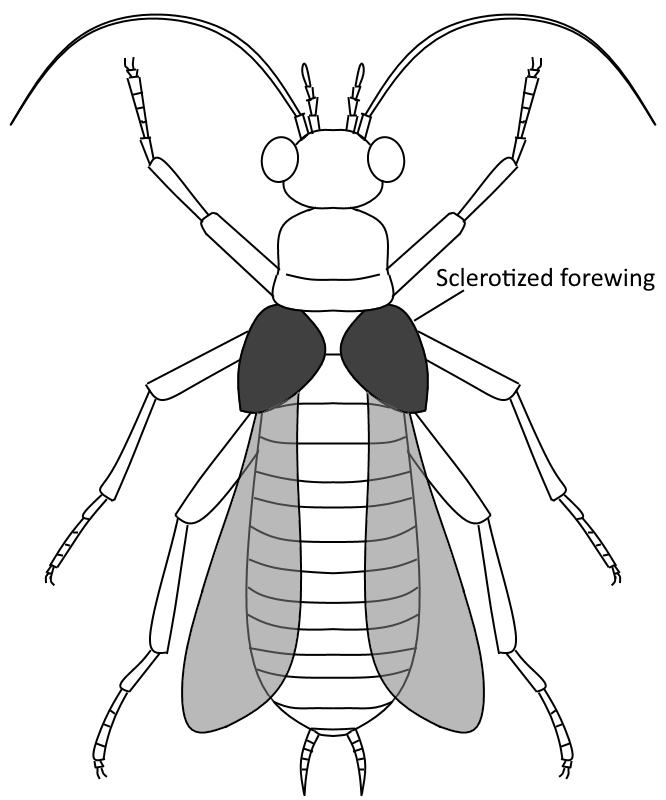
- Generic reconstruction of an alienopterid adult
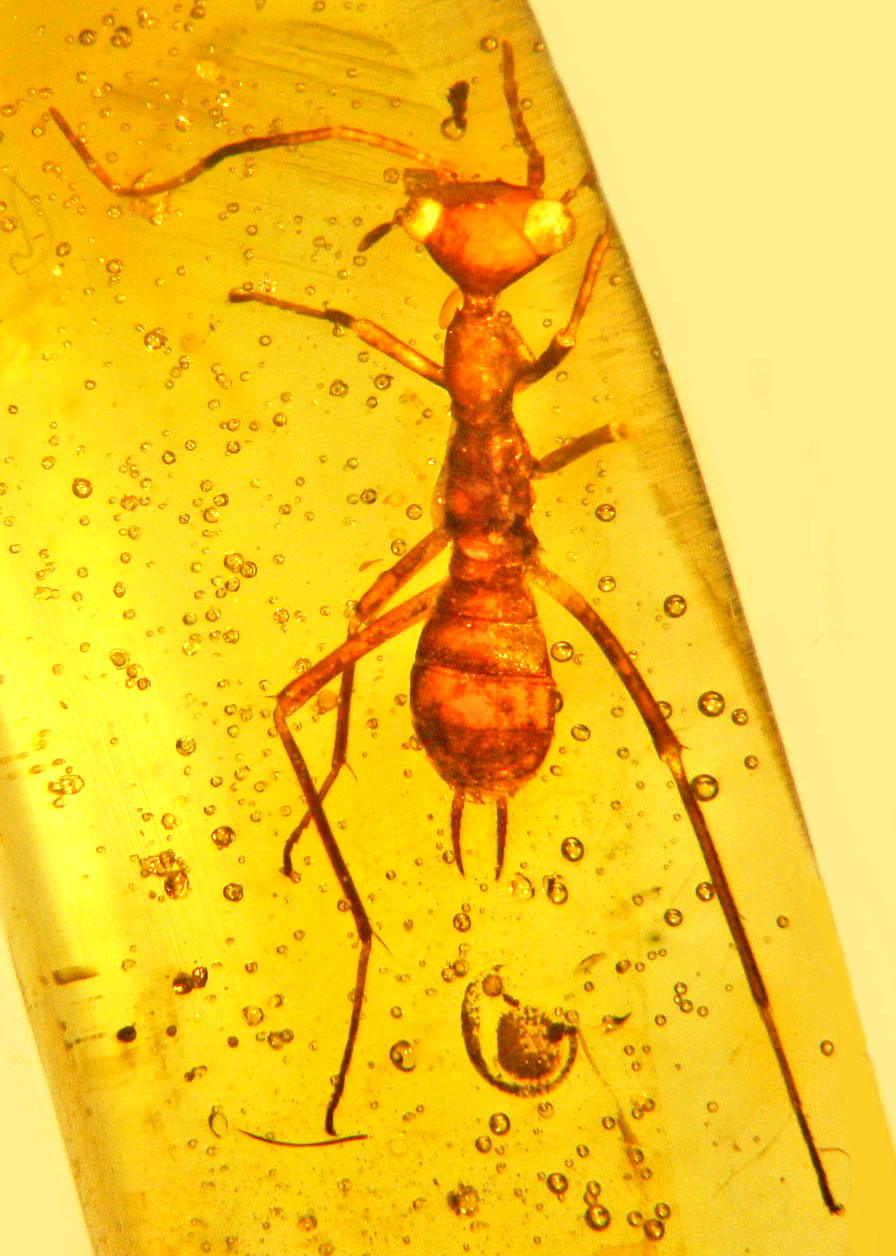
- Aethiocarenus, an alienopterid nymph

Scientific classification
- Kingdom: Animalia
- Phylum: Arthropoda
- Clade: Pancrustacea
- Class: Insecta
- Superfamily: †Umenocoleoidea
- Family: †Alienopteridae; Bai et al, 2016

Type genus
- †Alienopterus Bai et al, 2016

Genera
- †Aethiocarenus; †Alienopterella; †Alienopterix?; †Alienopterus; †Apiblatta; †Caputoraptor; †Chimaeroblattina; †Formicamendax; †Grant; †Meilia; †Teyia; †Vcelesvab; †Vzrkadlenie?

Synonyms
- Aethiocarenidae

= Alienopteridae =

Alienopteridae Temporal range: Barremian–Lutetian

Extinct family of cockroaches

Alienopteridae is an extinct family of dictyopterans, known from the Early Cretaceous to the Eocene epoch. They are noted for their unusual combination of features not found in other dictyopterans.

== Description ==
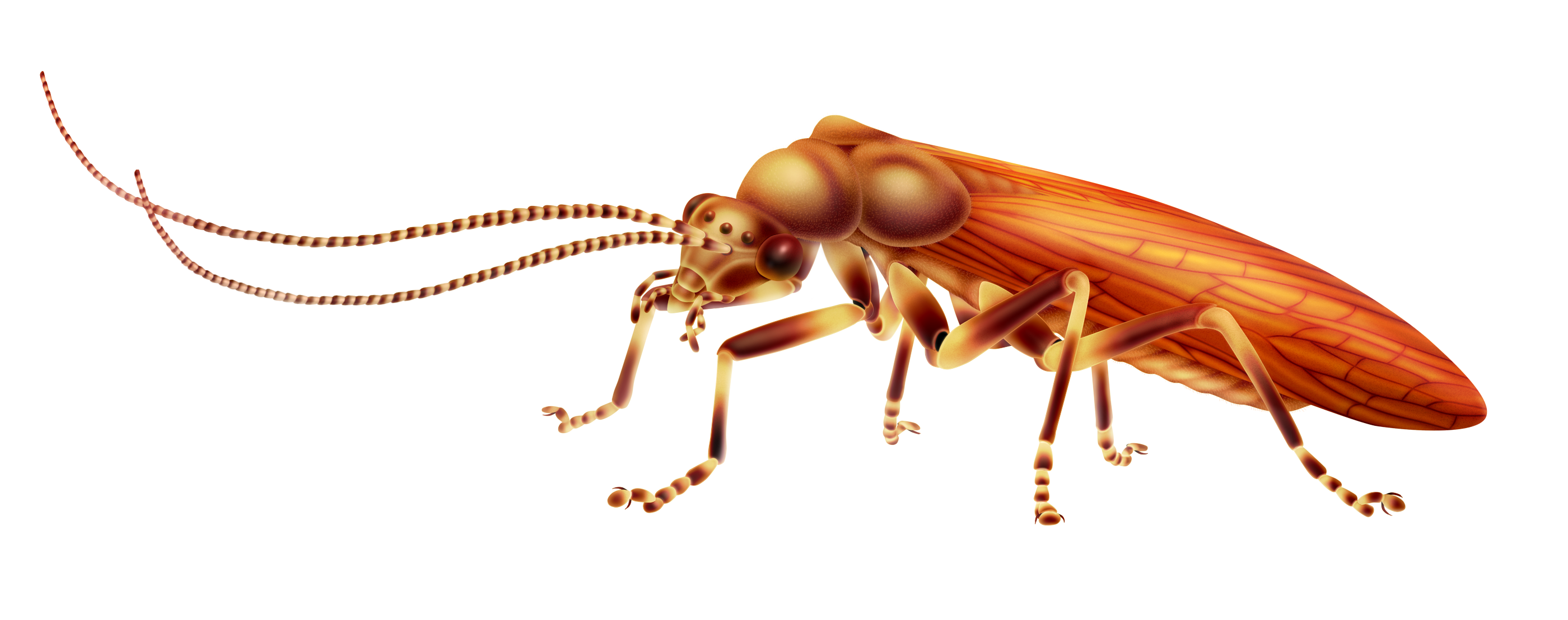
Life restoration of a landed Alienopterus

Alienopterid nymphs vary in morphology, some are superficially ant-like, while others are more robust. In adult alienopterids, the first set of wings are reduced into shortened sclerotised scale-like structures. The compound eyes are large, and the head generally triangular shaped and able to rotate.

== Taxonomy ==
It was originally assigned to its own order Alienoptera by Bai et al., 2016. It was reassigned to the dictyopteran superfamily Umenocoleoidea as sister family to the beetle-like Umenocoleidae by Vršanský et al. (2018), and a more recent analysis similarly places Alienopteridae and Umenocoleidae as sister taxa within Dictyoptera, but placing both lineages outside of Blattodea. Luo et al. (2022) revived the order Alienoptera for the clade containing Alienopteridae and Umenocoleidae. Their cladistic analysis recovered Alienoptera as the sister group to Mantodea (praying mantises). However, reanalysis of Luo et al. (2022) by Zhang (2026) questioned the reproducibility and robustness of these results. Under equal weighting, Alienopteridae and Umenocoleidae were not recovered as sister groups, while alternative implied weighting settings produced poorly supported or unstable relationships.

== Distribution ==
The majority of the alienopterid genera are known from the mid Cretaceous (latest Albian-earliest Cenomanian ~ 100 million years ago) Burmese amber found in Myanmar; though an additional two genera (Apiblatta and Vcelesvab) are from the late Aptian Crato Formation (Brazil), and the two youngest genera (Chimaeroblattina and Grant) are from the middle Eocene Green River Formation (Colorado, United States).

== Ecology ==
In a 2018 paper, some alienopterid adults were suggested as mimics of various hymenopterans, including bees and ants. However this was mostly rejected in another study as lacking evidence. A 2021 study alternatively suggested that some alienopterid nymphs functioned as ant mimics, based on morphological features that closely resembled contemporary sphecomyrmine ants, and suggested that the adult genus Teyia was also a wasp mimic, though mimicry in other adult alienopterids was rejected. One alienopterid nymph was found laden with gymnosperm pollen (probably from a cycad or a bennettitalean), suggesting that it consumed pollen as part of its diet, and that it also acted as a pollinator. Alienopterid adults have been suggested to be predators adapted to moving through dense foliage, with the small sclerotised forewings being an adaptation for flight capability.

== Genera ==
- Superfamily †Umenocoleoidea Chen & Tan, 1973
  - Family †Alienopteridae Bai et al., 2016
    - †Aethiocarenus Poinar & Brown, 2016
    - †Alienopterella Kočárek, 2018
    - †Alienopterus Bai et al. 2016
    - †Apiblatta Barna & Bigalk, 2018
    - †Caputoraptor Bai et al., 2018
    - †Chimaeroblattina Barna, 2018
    - †Formicamendax Hinkelman, 2019
    - †Grant Aristov, 2018
    - †Meilia Vršanský & Wang, 2018
    - †Teyia Vršanský et al., 2018
    - †Vcelesvab Vršanský et al. 2018

An undescribed species is also known from the Turonian aged Orapa kimberlite pipe sediments in Botswana. Luo, Xu & Jarzembowski (2020) transferred Alienopterix and Vzrkadlenies, originally described as alienopterids, to the family Cratovitismidae. A 2021 study later considered Alienopterix an umenocoleid instead.
