= Junan County =

Junan County 莒南县
- County
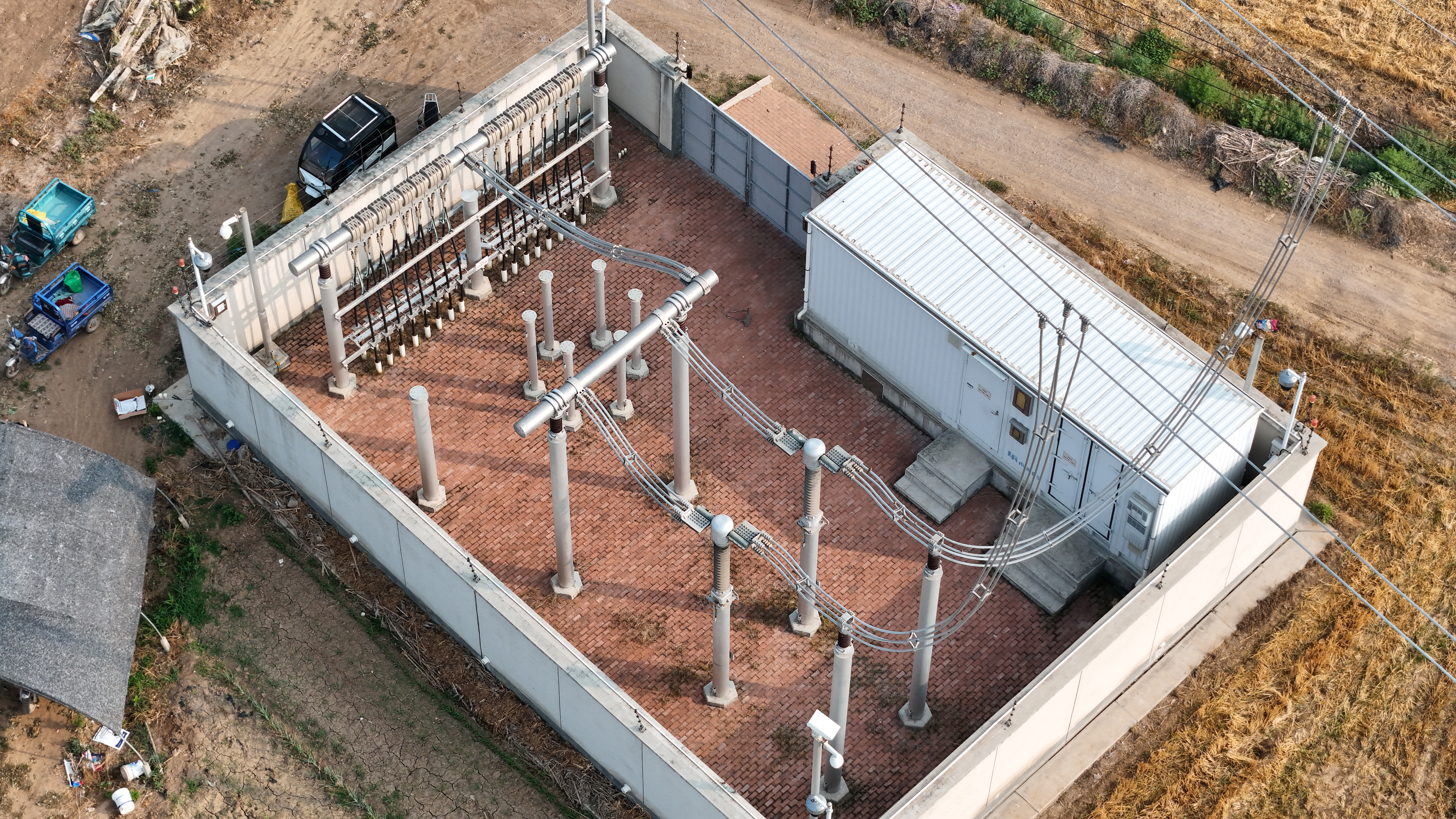
- Ground electrode for the Shanghai Temple-Shandong UHVDC project's Yinan Converter Station

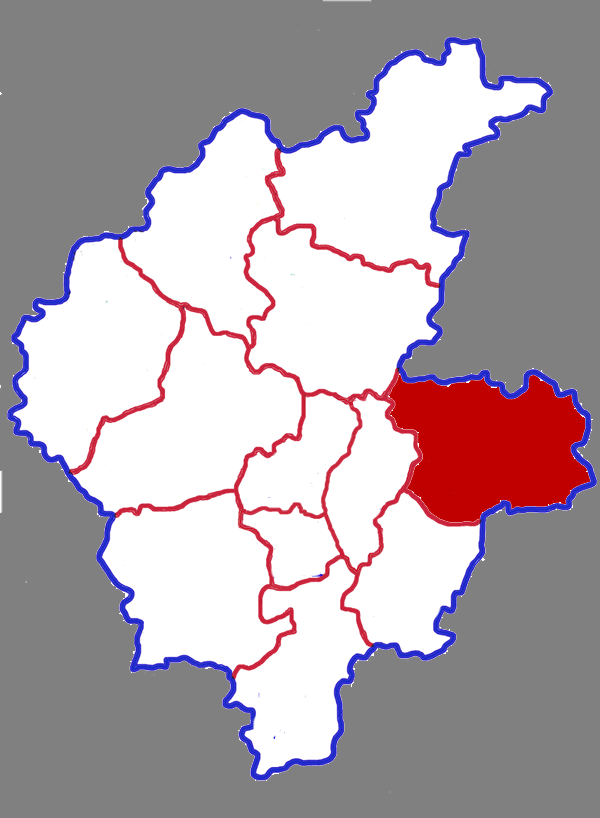
- Junan in Linyi

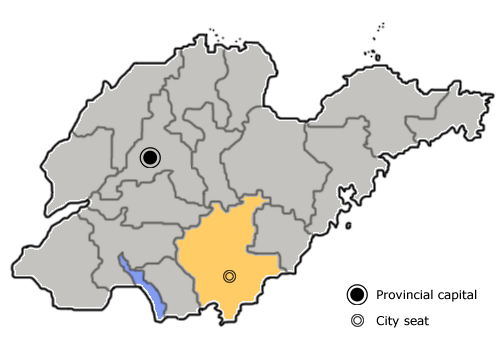
- Linyi in Shandong
- Coordinates: 35°10′29″N 118°50′07″E
- Country: People's Republic of China
- Province: Shandong
- Prefecture-level city: Linyi

Area
  - Total: 1,751 km^{2} (676 sq mi)
- Elevation: 113 m (371 ft)

Population (2019)
  - Total: 781,900
  - Density: 446.5/km^{2} (1,157/sq mi)
- Time zone: UTC+8 (China Standard)
- Postal code: 276600

Junan County (simplified Chinese: 莒南县; traditional Chinese: 莒南縣; pinyin: Jǔnán Xiàn) is a county of southern Shandong province, People's Republic of China, bordering Jiangsu province to the south. It is under the administration of Linyi City. Junan County has a total area of 1752 square kilometers.

The population was 986,661 in 1999. The resident population of Junan County is 841,000.

Junan County is an important part of the Yimeng revolutionary base area, one of the four first-class revolutionary old areas in the province, hailed as the "Red Capital of Qilu" and the "Little Yan'an of Shandong Province".

== History ==
During the Western Zhou period, the area of Junan belonged to the State of Xiang.

During the Eastern Zhou period, the State of Xiang was annexed by the State of Junan, and the southern part of the region came under Junan control.

During the Sui dynasty, the region belonged to Junan County of Yizhou (Langya Commandery).

In the Tang dynasty, it was administered under Junan County of Mizhou in the Henan Circuit.

During the Northern Song dynasty, it remained under Junan County of Mizhou, which was part of the Eastern Jingdong Circuit.

== Administrative divisions ==
As of 2012, this county is divided to 16 towns and 2 townships.

Towns

- Shizilu (十字路镇)
- Tuanlin (团林镇)
- Dadian (大店镇)
- Fangqian (坊前镇)
- Pingshang (坪上镇)
- Banquan (板泉镇)
- Zhubian (洙边镇)
- Wentuan (文疃镇)
- Zhuanggang (壮岗镇)
- Tingshui (汀水镇)
- Shilianzi (石莲子镇)
- Lingquan (岭泉镇)
- Yanbin (筵宾镇)
- Laopo (涝坡镇)
- Zhulu (朱芦镇)

Townships

- Daokou Township (道口乡)
- Xianggou Township (相沟乡)
- Xiangdi Township (相坻乡)

== Climate ==
Junan County is a semi-humid continental climate in warm temperate monsoon area with continental degree of 61.1%.The average annual temperature is 12.7 °C, precipitation is 856.7mm, frost-free period is 200 days, and the average annual sunshine is 2434.6 hours.

Junan County's climate features warm spring, dry and windy; humid summer, abundant rainfall; cool autumn, day and night temperature difference; cold winter, little rain and snow. Four distinct seasons, plenty of light, long frost-free period.

Climate data for Junan, elevation 114 m (374 ft), (1991–2020 normals, extremes 1981–2010)
Month	Jan	Feb	Mar	Apr	May	Jun	Jul	Aug	Sep	Oct	Nov	Dec	Year
Record high °C (°F)	16.1 (61.0)	23.1 (73.6)	27.5 (81.5)	32.7 (90.9)	38.8 (101.8)	38.0 (100.4)	41.4 (106.5)	36.5 (97.7)	36.0 (96.8)	33.7 (92.7)	25.9 (78.6)	18.6 (65.5)	41.4 (106.5)
Mean daily maximum °C (°F)	4.6 (40.3)	7.7 (45.9)	13.4 (56.1)	20.2 (68.4)	25.7 (78.3)	29.1 (84.4)	30.6 (87.1)	30.0 (86.0)	26.7 (80.1)	21.2 (70.2)	13.5 (56.3)	6.6 (43.9)	19.1 (66.4)
Daily mean °C (°F)	−0.3 (31.5)	2.4 (36.3)	7.6 (45.7)	14.2 (57.6)	19.9 (67.8)	23.6 (74.5)	26.3 (79.3)	25.8 (78.4)	21.7 (71.1)	15.8 (60.4)	8.5 (47.3)	1.8 (35.2)	13.9 (57.1)
Mean daily minimum °C (°F)	−4.0 (24.8)	−1.5 (29.3)	3.0 (37.4)	9.2 (48.6)	15.0 (59.0)	19.5 (67.1)	23.2 (73.8)	22.7 (72.9)	17.8 (64.0)	11.4 (52.5)	4.4 (39.9)	−1.9 (28.6)	9.9 (49.8)
Record low °C (°F)	−17.2 (1.0)	−14.0 (6.8)	−10.1 (13.8)	−2.6 (27.3)	3.4 (38.1)	10.3 (50.5)	16.2 (61.2)	12.7 (54.9)	6.5 (43.7)	−1.4 (29.5)	−9.0 (15.8)	−16.1 (3.0)	−17.2 (1.0)
Average precipitation mm (inches)	12.7 (0.50)	17.8 (0.70)	21.9 (0.86)	35.7 (1.41)	67.7 (2.67)	90.5 (3.56)	228.3 (8.99)	201.9 (7.95)	86.0 (3.39)	33.6 (1.32)	31.6 (1.24)	16.2 (0.64)	843.9 (33.23)
Average precipitation days (≥ 0.1 mm)	3.6	4.4	4.8	6.5	7.2	8.1	13.2	13.1	7.4	5.5	5.2	3.6	82.6
Average snowy days	3.3	3.0	1.3	0.1	0	0	0	0	0	0	0.7	2.0	10.4
Average relative humidity (%)	62	62	59	60	64	71	81	82	74	67	66	63	68
Mean monthly sunshine hours	165.5	163.2	207.8	221.2	239.4	203.3	176.8	183.6	187.7	194.9	165.3	168.8	2,277.5
Percentage possible sunshine	53	53	56	56	55	47	40	44	51	56	54	56	52
Source: China Meteorological Administration
