= List of stratigraphic units with theropod tracks =

The following tables list the global geological sites where tracks of theropod dinosaurs have been found, together with the proper names of the rock formations (stratigraphic units) that contain them.

== Non-avian theropods ==
Name	Age	Location	Description
Aganane Formation	Pliensbachian	Morocco	Up to 1350 tracks, most of them currently undescribed. Includes small, medium and large theropods.
Akaiwa Formation		Japan	Description
Ansbachersandstein		Germany	Description
Antenor Navarro Formation		Brazil	Description
Arapahoe Formation		USA	Description
Areado Group		Brazil	Description
Aréen Formation		Morocco	Description
Argana Formation	Middle Carnian	Morocco	Description
Argiles de l'Irhazer		Niger	Description
Aztec Sandstone		USA	Description
Ball's Bluff Formation		USA	Description
Bell Ranch Formation		USA	Description
Bell Springs Formation		USA	Description
Benkersandstein		Germany	Description
Bhuj Formation		India	Description
Blackstone Formation		Canada	Description
Blasensandstein		Germany	Description
Blomidon Formation		Canada	Description
Bohdašín Formation		Czech Republic	An isolated, 14 cm long tridactyl footprint of a coelophysoid theropod dinosaur, late Triassic age.
Boonton Formation		USA	Description
Botucatu Formation		Brazil	Description
Broome Sandstone		Australia	Description
Caiua Formation		Paraguay; Brazil	Description
Cadomin Formation		Canada	Description
Castellar Formation		Spain	Description
Morrison Formation	Time	USA	Description
Calcaires Lithographiques de Cerin		France	Description
Calcare di Cellina Formation		Italy	Description
Calcari Grigi di Noriglio Formation		Italy	Description
Cañadon Asfalto Formation	Callovian	Argentina	Description
Cardium Formation		Canada	Description
Carmel Formation		USA	Description
Cazaderos Formation		Ecuador	Description
Chacarilla Formation		Chile	Description
Chandler Formation		Canada	Description
Chaunaca Formation		Bolivia	Description
Chiloo Group		China	Description
Chinle Formation		USA	Description
Cow Branch Formation		USA	Description
Dolomia Principale Formation		European Alps	Description
Donghe Group		China	Description
Dunvegan Formation		Canada	Description
East Berlin Formation		USA	Description
Entrada Sandstone		USA	Description
Etjo Sandstone	Early Jurassic	Namibia	Tracks of Prosauropoda indet., Theropoda indet., Tetrapodium elmenhorsti, Saurichnium anserinum, S. damarense, S. parallelum & S. tetractis in an aeolian environment
Feltville Formation		USA	Description
Festningen Sandstone		Norway	Description
Fleming Fjord Formation	Middle Norian	Greenland	Description
Forest Marble Formation		UK	Description
Fort Terrett Formation		USA	Description
Gates Formation		Canada	Description
Geoncheonri Formation		South Korea	Description
Gething Formation		Canada	Description
Gettysburg Formation		USA	Description
Glen Rose Formation	Late Aptian to Early Albian	USA	Description
Gres d'Assaouas Formation		Niger	Description
Gypsum Spring Formation		China	Description
Haman Formation		South Korea	Description
Harebell Formation		USA	Description
Hasandong Formation		South Korea	Description
Hastings Beds	Late Berriasian to Valanginian	UK	Description
Heichengtzu Series		China	Description
Higuerueles Formation		Spain	Description
Hoganas Formation		Sweden	Description
Horseshoe Canyon Formation	Early Maastrichtian	Canada	Description
Iouaridene Formation		Morocco	Description
Itapecuru Formation		Brazil	Description
Izuki Formation		Japan	Description
Jeomgog Formation		South Korea	Description
Jiaguan Formation		China	Description
Jindong Formation		South Korea	Description
Jing Chuan Formation		China	Description
Jinju Formation		South Korea	Description
Kagidani Formation		Japan	Description
Karabil Svita		[[|]]	Description
Kayenta Formation	Sinemurian to Pliensbachian	USA	Description
Kem Kem Beds		Morocco; Algeria	Description
Kitadani Formation	Aptian to Albian	Japan	Description
Kurek Svita Formation		Uzbekistan	Description
Kuruma Group		Japan	Description
Kuwajima Formation		Japan	Description
La Cantera Formation		Argentina	Description
Laramie Formation	Late Maastrichtian	USA	Description
Lastres Formation		Spain	Description
Los Rastros Formation		Argentina	Description
La Matilde Formation		Argentina	Description
Luchak Svita Formation		Tajikistan	Description
Manassas Sandstone		USA	Description
Matsuo Group		Japan	Description
McCoy Brook Formation		Canada	Description
Mercia Mudstone Group		UK	Description
Mesaverde Formation		USA	Description
Mexcala Formation		Mexico	Description
Midland Formation		USA	Description
Minnes Formation		Canada	Description
Mist Mountain Formation		Canada	Description
Moenave Formation		USA	Description
Molteno Formation		South Africa	Description
Montemarcello Formation		Italy	Description
Morrison Formation	Time	USA	Description
Nagatogawa Formation		Japan	Description
Naknek Formation		USA	Description
Navajo Sandstone	Pliensbachian to Toarcian	USA	Description
Nemegt Formation	Early Maastrichtian	Mongolia	- has a few alternate spellings
Nugget Sandstone		USA	Description
Oncala Group		Spain	Description
Pajarito Formation		USA	Description
Patuxent Formation		USA	Description
Phra Wihan Formation		Thailand	Description
Phu Phan Formation		Thailand	Description
Piedrahita de Muno Formation		Spain	Description
Piranhas Formation		Brazil	Description
Plainview Formation		USA	Description
Plattensandstein		Germany	Description
Portezuelo Formation	Carnian	Argentina	Description
Portland Formation	Pliensbachian to Toarcian	USA	Description
Precipice Sandstone		Australia	Description
Purbeck Beds	Berriasian	UK	Description
Quarziti Viola Zonate Formation		Italy	Description
Raton Formation		USA	Description
Razorback Beds		Australia	Description
Redonda Formation		USA	Description
Reuchenette Formation		Switzerland	Description
Rio Limay Formation		Argentina	Description
Sagog Formation		South Korea	Description
Saltwick Formation		UK	Description
Samana Suk Limestone		Pakistan	
San Giovanni Rotondo Formation		Italy	Description
Santa Lucia Formation		Bolivia	Description
Sebayashi Formation		Japan	Description
Segovia Formation		USA	Description
Sheep Pen Sandstone Formation		USA	Description
Shemshak Formation		Iran	Description
Shirabad Svita		Tajikistan	Description
Shuttle Meadow Formation		USA	Description
Sloan Canyon Formation		USA	Description
Soncco Formation		Peru	Description
Sousa Formation		Brazil	Description
South Platte Formation		USA	Description
Stockton Beds		USA	Description
Stubensandstein	Middle Norian	Germany	Description
Summerville Formation		USA	Description
Takutu Formation		Brazil	Description
Tantalus Formation		Canada	Description
Tecocoyunca Group		Mexico	Description
Terenes Formation		Spain	Description
Tochikubo Formation		Japan	Description
Tomanova Formation		Slovakia	Description
Tongfosi Formation		China	Description
Towaco Formation		USA	Description
Uhangri Formation		South Korea	Description
Vega Formation		Spain	Description
Vilquechico Formation		Peru	Description
Walloon Group		Australia	Description
White Limestone Formation		UK	Description
Wealden Group		UK	Description
Wingate Sandstone		USA	Description
Winton Formation	Cenomanian	Australia	
Woodbine Formation		USA	Description
Xiguayuan Formation		China	Description
Zagaje Formation		Poland	Description
Zorillo Formation		Mexico	Description

== Avialans ==
Name	Age	Location	Description
Cerro del Pueblo Formation		Mexico	Description
Dunvegan Formation		Canada	Description
Gates Formation		Canada	Description
Gething Formation		Canada	Description
Haman Formation		South Korea	Description
Izuki Formation		Japan	Description
Jeomgog Formation		South Korea	Description
Jindong Formation		South Korea	Description
Jing Chuan Formation		China	Description
Kitadani Formation	Aptian to Albian	Japan	Description
Lastres Formation		Spain	Description
Mist Mountain Formation		Canada	Description
Oncala Group		Spain	Description
South Platte Formation		USA	Description
Uhangri Formation		South Korea	Description

== See also ==
- List of dinosaur-bearing rock formations
- List of fossil sites
