= Terrett =

Terrett is a surname. Notable people with the surname include:

- Ben Terrett (born 1975), British designer
- Keith Terrett (born 1956), British musician, composer, and educator
- Terrett Butte, landmark in Montana
- Terrett v. Taylor, 1815 lawsuit

== See also ==
- Fort Terrett, Texas, army post
- Fort Terrett Formation, geological formation
- Terret (disambiguation)
