= Jeomgog Formation =

Geologic formation in South Korea

- Stratigraphic range: Albian; ~105 Ma
- Type: Geological formation
- Unit of: Hayang Group
- Underlies: Sagog Formation
- Overlies: Hupyeongdong Formation
- Thickness: 260~900 meters

Location
- Coordinates: 36.4°N 128.8°E
- Approximate paleocoordinates: 44.9°N 124.8°E
- Country: South Korea
- Extent: Gyeongsang Basin
- Jeomgog Formation (South Korea)

The Jeomgog Formation (Korean: 점곡층; Hanja: 點谷層; RR: Jeomgok-cheung) is a Lower Cretaceous (Albian) geologic formation of the Hayang Group in the Gyeongsang Basin of South Korea.

== Fossil content ==
Fossil theropod tracks have been reported from the formation.

== See also ==
- List of dinosaur-bearing rock formations
  - List of stratigraphic units with theropod tracks
- Geoncheonri Formation
- Hupyeongdong Formation
- Haman Formation
- Hasandong Formation
- Jinju Formation
