= Caverns of Sonora =

Cave in Texas, United States

- Location within Texas
- Location: Sutton County, Texas, United States
- Nearest city: Sonora, Texas
- Coordinates: 30.555°N 100.81227°W
- Website: www.cavernsofsonora.com

U.S. National Natural Landmark
- Designated: 1965

The Caverns of Sonora, a National Natural Landmark, is a unique cave located 8 miles (13 km) west of the small city of Sonora, the seat of Sutton County, Texas. It is a world-class cave because of its stunning array of calcite crystal formations, especially helictites. These helictites are found in extreme abundance, often with a rare purity and complexity. One formation is so densely packed with them, it has been dubbed the "snake pit". The founder of the National Speleological Society, Bill Stephenson, said of the cave after his first visit: "This is the most indescribably beautiful cave in the world, its beauty cannot be exaggerated, not even by a Texan."

== History ==
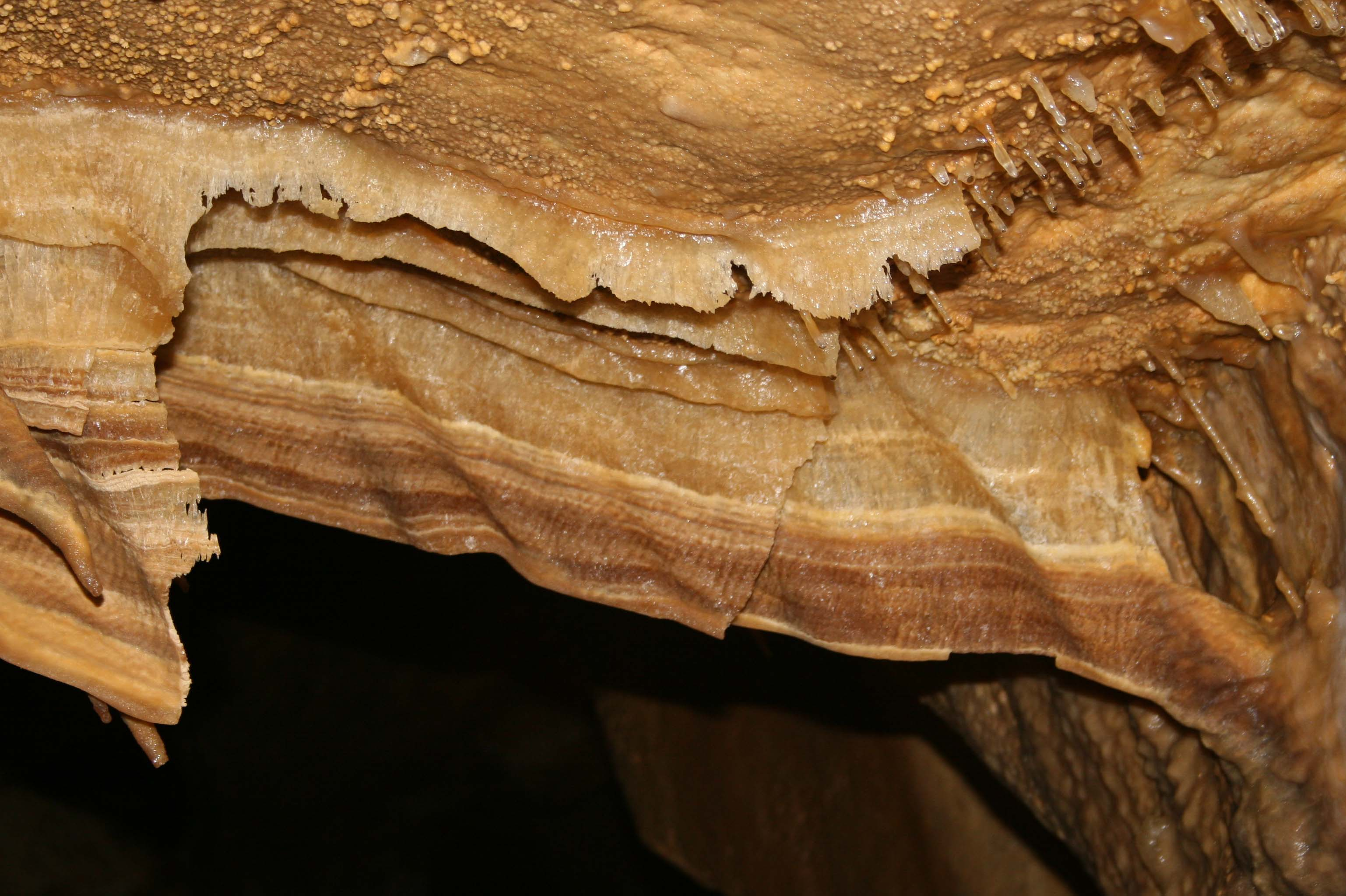
Cave bacon, a type of cave drapery in the Caverns of Sonora

The cave is formed in 100-million-year-old (Cretaceous) Segovia Limestone, of the Edwards Group. The formation of the cave itself probably occurred between 1.5 and 5 million years ago. The cave is formed primarily along joints, which allowed gases to rise up from depths of around 1.5 mi (2.4 km) to then depths of about 300 ft (91 m). At this depth, the gases mixed with water in the aquifer. The resulting highly acidic water dissolved out the limestone, forming the cave. Between 1 and 3 million years ago, the water drained from the cave. The famous mineral formations, known as speleothems, all formed after the water drained from the cave.

The cave's most famous formation was the butterfly. It was the only known formation like it in the world. It was formed by two fishtail helictite growths that share the same attachment point of the cave wall. In November, 2006, about a third of the right wing was broken off of the formation.

== Development ==
The first quarter-mile of the cave was known to local ranch-hands by the early 1900s. It was known by the name Mayfield Cave, after the landowner, Stanley Mayfield. In 1955, Stanley gave permission to four cavers from Dallas, who discovered a further seven miles, including what are now considered the most scenic areas.

Today, 2 mi (3.2 km) of trail have been developed from the 7 mi (11 km) of explored cave. A steel gate was installed on June 15, 1957, at the entrance to protect the cave from vandalism. The cave was then renamed "Secret Cave" to protect its location. In 1957, Jim Papadakis a member of the National Speleological Society, geologist and professional photographer fell in love with the cave. During Jim's many trips to the cave, he observed that the delicate cave formations were being destroyed by negligent explorers. Jim realized the only way to protect the "Secret Cave" would be to open it to the public as a showcase cave with guided tours. In February 1960, Jim negotiated a lease with Stanley Mayfield to develop the cave. The cave project began, which included a fenced access road, two miles of power line, a telephone line, a water-well was drilled and a small visitor center was built. Jim hired friend and caver, Jack Burch to help construct the trails and install electrical lighting which provided safe viewing for public tours.

The cave is named after the nearby town of Sonora. The Cave was opened for public tours July 16, 1960. In 1961, Jim sold the Caverns of Sonora to nine Sonora investors. They formed a corporation with Stanley Mayfield at the head. In April 1963, the Texas House of Representatives gave the Caverns of Sonora a special citation. On December 1, 1965, the National Park Service included the Caverns in the National Register of Natural Landmarks.

== See also ==
- Lechuguilla Cave
