= Sagog Formation =

Early Cretaceous geologic formation in South Korea

- Stratigraphic range: Albian; ~100 Ma
- Type: Geological formation
- Unit of: Hayang Group
- Underlies: Chunsan Formation
- Overlies: Jeomgog Formation

Lithology
- Primary: Shale, sandstone

Location
- Coordinates: 36.3°N 128.7°E
- Approximate paleocoordinates: 43.2°N 127.8°E
- Region: North Gyeongsang Province
- Country: South Korea
- Extent: Euiseong Subbasin, Gyeongsan Basin
- Sagog Formation (South Korea)

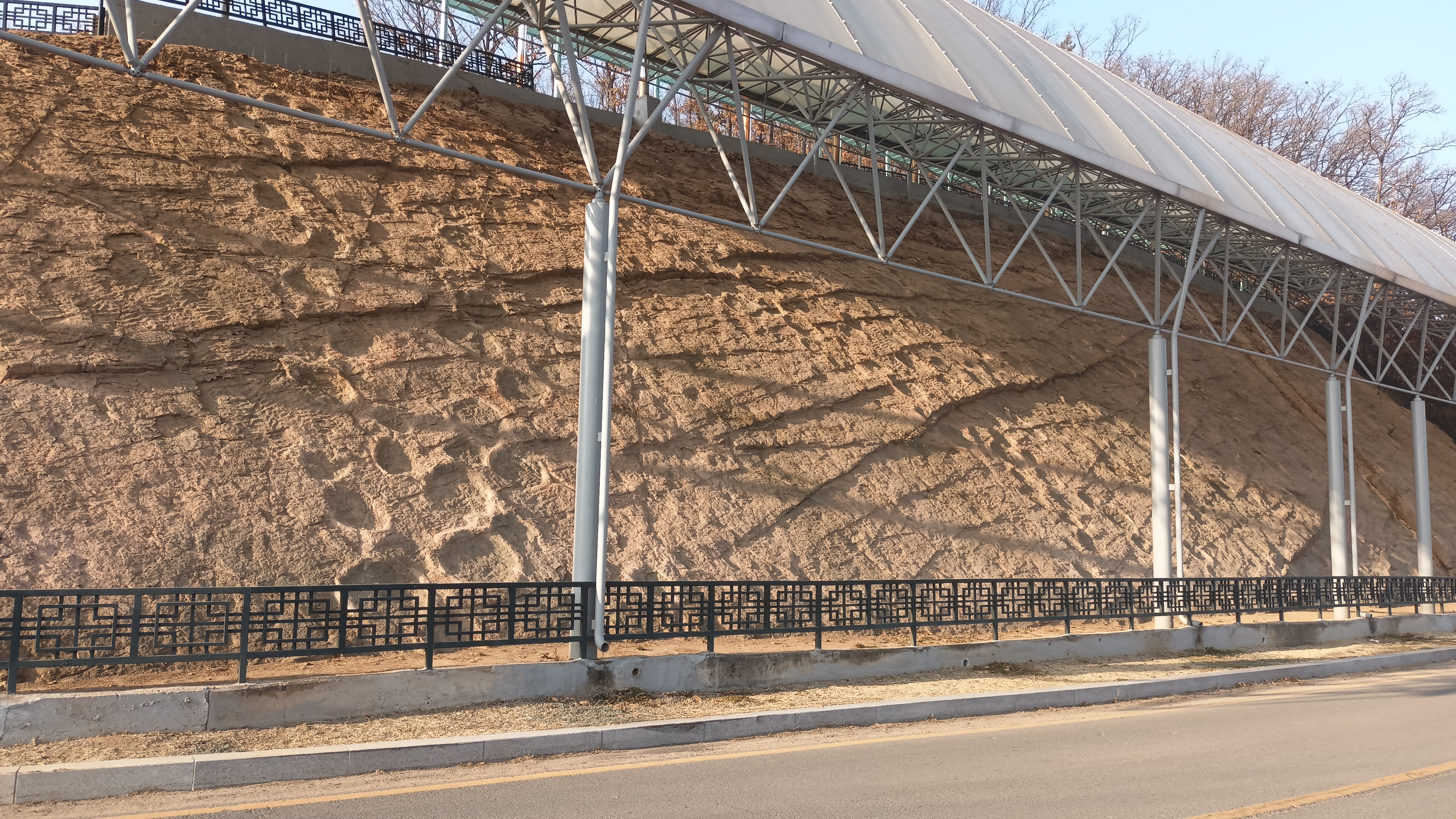
Dinosaur footprints and Gyeongsang supergroup Sagok formation in Jeori Dinosaur Tracksite.

The Sagog Formation (Korean: 사곡층; Hanja: 舍谷層; RR: Sagok-cheung), also known as the Sagok Formation, is an Albian geologic formation in South Korea.

== Description ==
Fossil sauropod tracks have been reported from the formation. It is laterally equivalent to the Haman Formation. It predominantly consists of red to dark grey shale and sandstone.

== See also ==
- List of dinosaur-bearing rock formations
  - List of stratigraphic units with sauropodomorph tracks
    - Sauropod tracks
- Geoncheonri Formation
- Guyedong Formation
- Hasandong Formation
- Jinju Formation
