= Zhiluo Formation =

Geological formation in China

- Stratigraphic range: Middle to Late Jurassic, Bathonian–Oxfordian
- Type: Geological formation
- Sub-units: Lower, Upper units
- Underlies: Lower Cretaceous Dongsheng Formation
- Overlies: Yanan Formation
- Thickness: 100-200 metres

Lithology
- Primary: Sandstone, siltstone mudstone

Location
- Region: Shaanxi
- Country: China
- Extent: Ordos Basin

The Zhiluo Formation is a geological formation in China, it is also alternatively considered a geological group under the name Zhiluo Group (formerly known as the Chiloo Group). It dates to the Middle Jurassic. It consists of sandstone, mudstone and siltstone of varying colours. It has received scientific attention for its uranium ore bodies present in the lower part of the formation. Fossil theropod tracks have been reported from the formation. These were described from two footprints found in Jiaoping Coal Mine by C. C. Young in 1966 as Shensipus tungchuanensis. These were in 2015 suggested to belong to Anomoepus. The diplodocoid sauropod dinosaur Lingwulong is known from the formation, previously having been erroneously attributed to the underlying Yanan Formation.

== Fossil content ==
| Color key: Taxon / Reclassified taxon / Taxon falsely reported as present / Dubious taxon or junior synonym / Ichnotaxon / Ootaxon / Morphotaxon | Notes; Uncertain or tentative taxa are in small text; ~~crossed out~~ taxa are discredited. |

=== Dinosaurs ===
==== Sauropods ====
Sauropods of the Zhiluo Formation
| Genus | Species | Location | Stratigraphic position | Material | Notes | Images |
|---|---|---|---|---|---|---|
| Lingwulong | L. shenqi | | | | A diplodocoid sauropod | |

=== Insects ===
Insects of the Zhiluo Formation
| Genus | Species | Location | Stratigraphic position | Material | Notes | Images |
|---|---|---|---|---|---|---|
| Orthophlebia | O. quadrimacula | | | | A orthophlebiid scorpionfly | |

== See also ==
- List of dinosaur-bearing rock formations
  - List of stratigraphic units with theropod tracks
