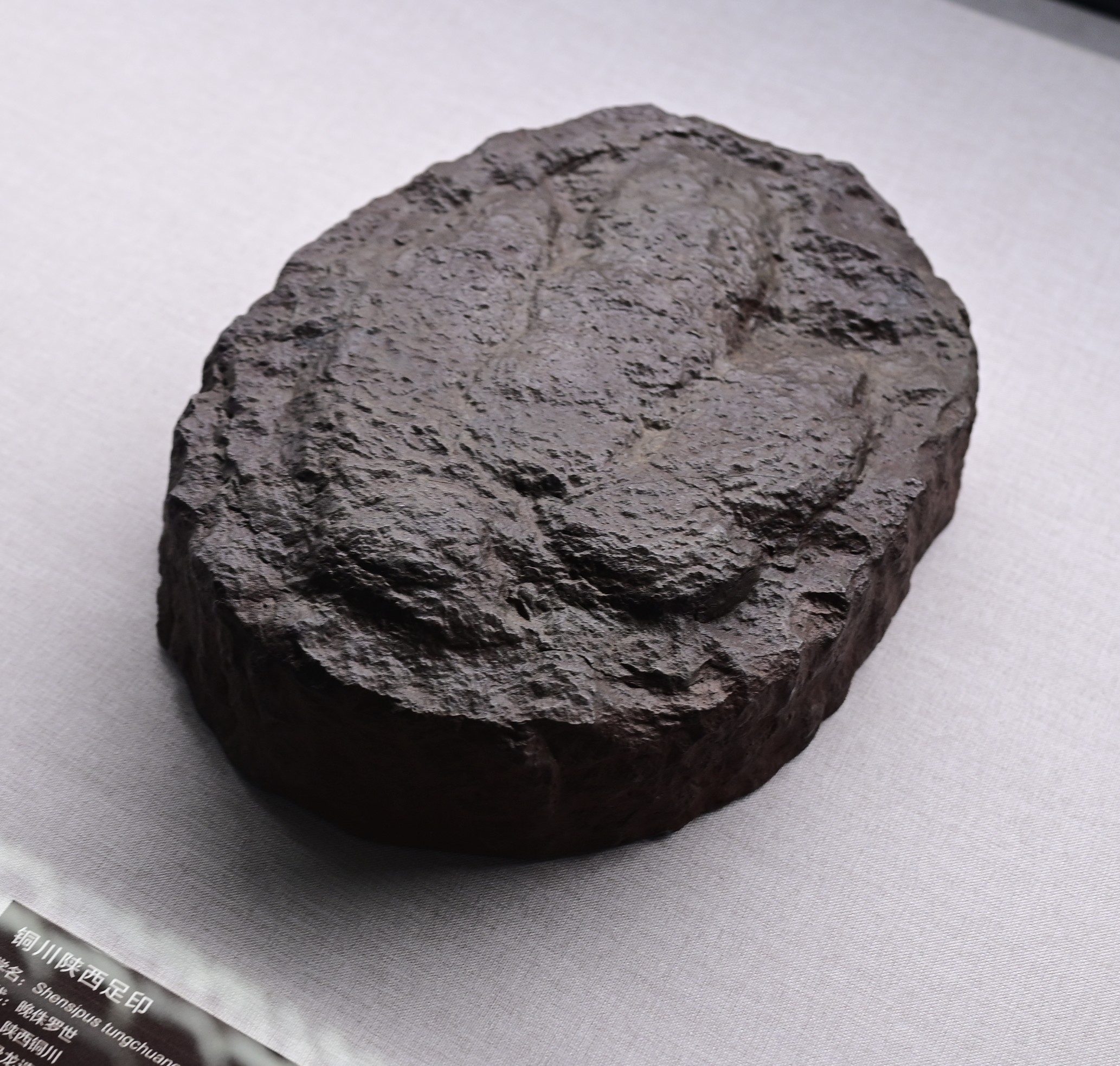
- Fossil specimen at the Baoding Natural History Museum

Trace fossil classification
- Kingdom: Animalia
- Phylum: Chordata
- Class: Reptilia
- Clade: Dinosauria
- Clade: Saurischia
- Clade: Theropoda
- Ichnofamily: †Grallatoridae
- Ichnogenus: †Shensipus; Young, 1966

= Shensipus =

Shensipus Temporal range: Middle Jurassic

Dinosaur footprint

Shensipus is an ichnogenus of dinosaur footprint. They were described from footprints found in Jiaoping Coal Mine by C. C. Young in 1966, which are part of the Zhiluo Formation. The genus was suggested in 2015 to be a synonym of Anomoepus.

== See also ==
- List of dinosaur ichnogenera
