= Terret (disambiguation) =

Terret or Terrets may refer to:

- Terret, part of a horse harness
- Terret (grape)
- Liselle Terret, British academic
- Tourette syndrome, a neurological disorder
- Terete, adjective meaning cylindrical with a tapering end or ends
- Terets (gunboat), an Imperial Russian gunboat

== See also ==
- Terrett, surname
