= Tomanová Formation =

Geologic formation in Slovakia

- Stratigraphic range: Norian-Rhaetian; ~222–202 Ma
- Type: Geological formation

Lithology
- Primary: Claystone
- Other: Sandstone

Location
- Coordinates: 49.2°N 19.9°E
- Approximate paleocoordinates: 23.4°N 24.1°E
- Region: Malopolskie; Tatra
- Country: Poland, Slovakia
- Tomanová Formation (Slovakia)

The Tomanová Formation is a Late Triassic (Norian to Rhaetian) geologic formation in Poland and Slovakia. Fossil theropod tracks have been reported from the formation.

== Fossil content ==
The following fossils have been reported from the formation:

Ichnofossils

- Coelurosaurichnus tatricus
- Anomoepus sp.
- Grallator (Eubrontes)
- cf. Kayentapus sp.
- ?Sauropodomorpha indet.

== See also ==
- List of dinosaur-bearing rock formations
  - List of stratigraphic units with theropod tracks
