= Quarziti Viola Zonate Formation =

- Type: Geological formation

Location
- Country: Italy

The Quarziti Viola Zonate Formation is a Mesozoic geologic formation in Italy. Fossil theropod tracks have been reported from the formation.

== See also ==
- List of dinosaur-bearing rock formations
  - List of stratigraphic units with theropod tracks
