= La Cantera Formation =

Geologic formation in Argentina

- Stratigraphic range: Late Aptian; ~118–113 Ma
- Type: Geological formation
- Unit of: Gigante Group

Lithology
- Primary: Siltstone
- Other: Sandstone, conglomerate

Location
- Coordinates: 33.0°S 66.5°W
- Approximate paleocoordinates: 33.1°S 32.7°W
- Region: San Luis Province, San Juan Province
- Country: Argentina
- Extent: San Luis Basin

Type section
- Named for: Cantera de Picca
- La Cantera Formation (Argentina)

The La Cantera Formation is a geologic formation in Argentina originating from the Late Aptian. Fossil theropod tracks have been reported in the formation. The formation, deposited under lacustrine conditions, also has provided fossil plants, insects, fish, and gastropods.

== Fossil content ==
Among others, the following fossils have been reported from the formation:

=== Insects ===
Hemiptera

- Canteronecta irajae
- Notonecta mazzoniae

=== Flora ===
- Alisporites similis
- Rugubivesiculites sp.
- Trisaccites microsaccatus
- Podosporites sp.
- Classopollis simplex
- Callialasporites trilobatus
- Cycadopites follicularis
- Crybelosporites sp.
- Appendicisporites sp.
- Cicatricosisporites australiensis
- Deltoidospora sp.
- Leptolepidites major
- Taurocusporites segmentatus
- Staplinisporites caminus
- Triporoletes reticulatus
- Coptospora sp.
- Couperisporites sp.
- Stephanocolpites mastandreai
- Clavatipollenites hughesii
- Leiosphaeridia hyalina
- L. menendezii
- Balmeiopsis limbatus
- Huitrinipollenites transitorius

== See also ==
- List of dinosaur-bearing rock formations
  - List of stratigraphic units with theropod tracks
