= Yanan Formation =

Geological formation in China

- Stratigraphic range: Toarcian–Bajocian
- Type: Geological formation
- Sub-units: Y1, Y2, Y3, Y4, Y5
- Underlies: Zhiluo Formation
- Overlies: Fuxian Formation
- Thickness: up to 220 metres (720 ft)

Lithology
- Primary: Sandstone, siltstone, mudstone, shale
- Other: Coal

Location
- Coordinates: 38.1°N 106.7°E
- Approximate paleocoordinates: 42.1°N 111.7°E
- Region: Ningxia, Shaanxi, Inner Mongolia
- Country: China
- Extent: Ordos Basin

Type section
- Named for: Yan'an
- Yanan Formation (China) Yanan Formation (Ningxia)

The Yanan Formation, alternatively spelled the Yan'an Formation (Chinese: 延安组), is a geological formation in China, it is also alternatively considered a group. The age of the formation is uncertain, with estimates ranging from Toarcian to Bajocian. It is divided up into 5 members, with the designation of Y1 through Y5. Y2, Y3 and Y4 are predominantly dark shales, while Y1 and Y5 are composed of sandstones, coal beds and interbedded mudstones. The depositional environment at the time was when the Ordos Basin formed a large inland lake, surrounded by floodplains. The dark shales have been explored for the potential of producing shale gas. The coal has also been explored for the production of coalbed methane. The formation is also notable for its fossil content, with dinosaur footprints having been found in the formation. The dinosaur Lingwulong was formerly thought to have been found in this formation, but the strata was later attributed to the overlying Zhiluo Formation.

== Fossil content ==
| Color key: Taxon / Reclassified taxon / Taxon falsely reported as present / Dubious taxon or junior synonym / Ichnotaxon / Ootaxon / Morphotaxon | Notes; Uncertain or tentative taxa are in small text; ~~crossed out~~ taxa are discredited. |

=== Dinosaurs ===
==== Sauropods ====
Sauropods of the Yanan Formation
| Genus | Species | Location | Stratigraphic position | Material | Notes | Images |
|---|---|---|---|---|---|---|
| Lingwulong | L. shenqi | | | | A diplodocoid sauropod. The attribution to the Yanan Formation was later found to be erroneous, and the species actually comes from the overlying Zhiluo Formation. | |

=== Insects ===
Insects of the Yanan Formation
| Genus | Species | Location | Stratigraphic position | Material | Notes | Images |
|---|---|---|---|---|---|---|
| Junfengi | J. yulinensis | | | | A campterophlebiid damsel-dragonfly | |
| Kisa | K. fasciata | | | | An archijassid hemipteran | |
| Orthophlebia | O. lini | | | | An orthophlebiid mecopteran | |
| Parasinitsia | P. qingyunensis | | | | A campterophlebiid damsel-dragonfly | |
| Pseudoundacypha | P. yananensis | | | | A thrips | |
| Qibinius | Q. maculatus | | | | A froghopper | |
| Samaroblatta | S. frondoidis | | | | A caloblattinid | |
| Sinagonophlebia | S. yananensis | | | | A paragonophlebiid damsel-dragonfly | |
| Sinolocustopsis | S. brevis | | | | A locustopsid orthopteran | |
| Sinolocustopsis | S. elongatus | | | | A locustopsid orthopteran | |
| Sinopsocus | S. yananensis | | | | A protopsyllidiid hemipteran | |
| Subaphidulum | S. sinica | | | | A protopsyllidiid hemipteran | |
| Yananphasma | Y. chresmodoides | | | | A susumaniid phasmatodean | |
| Yananphilius | Y. peizhuangensis | | | | A sepulcid hymenopteran | |
| Yananthemis | Y. zaoyuanensis | | | | A selenothemistid damsel-dragonfly | |

=== Plants ===
Plants of the Yanan Formation
| Genus | Species | Location | Stratigraphic position | Material | Notes | Images |
|---|---|---|---|---|---|---|
| Selaginellites | S. huatingensis | | | | A spikemoss | |
