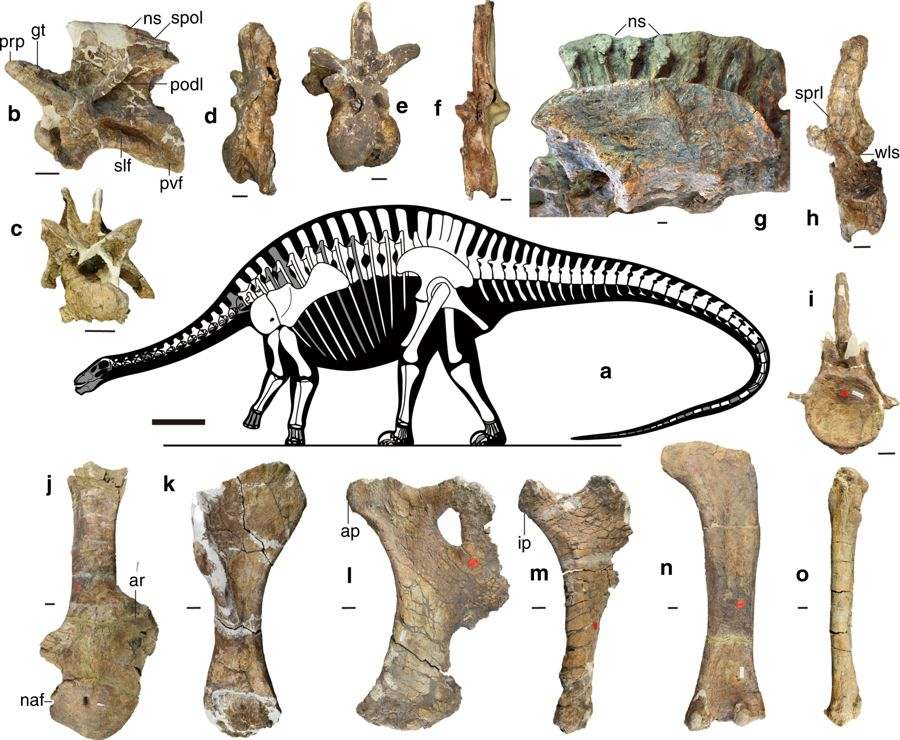
- Skeletal reconstruction and exemplar skeletal remains of L. shenqi

Scientific classification
- Kingdom: Animalia
- Phylum: Chordata
- Class: Reptilia
- Clade: Dinosauria
- Clade: Saurischia
- Clade: †Sauropodomorpha
- Clade: †Sauropoda
- Superfamily: †Diplodocoidea
- Genus: †Lingwulong; Xu et al., 2018
- Species: †L. shenqi

Binomial name
- †Lingwulong shenqi Xu et al., 2018

= Lingwulong =

Lingwulong Temporal range: Middle Jurassic

Dicraeosaurid dinosaur genus from Mid Jurassic China

Lingwulong is a genus of diplodocoid sauropod dinosaur from the Middle Jurassic of what is now Lingwu, Yinchuan, Ningxia, China. The type and only species is L. shenqi, known from several partial skeletons. It is one of the earliest neosauropods ever discovered, as well as the only definitive diplodocoid from east Asia.

== Discovery ==
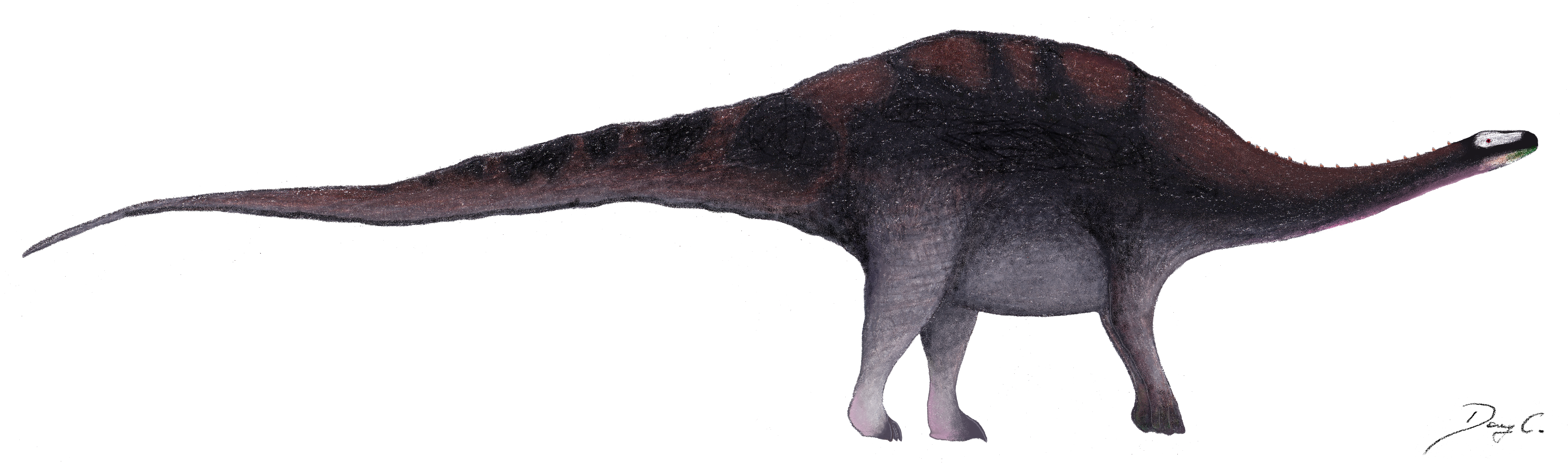
Life restoration of Lingwulong shenqi

In 2004, sheep herder Ma Yun found dinosaur bones, notifying local administrators Yang Huozhu and Liu Hongan. In the spring of 2005 these showed the fossils to dinosaur expert Xu Xing who sent out a team to investigate the find. From 2005 onwards several quarries ware excavated at Ciyaopu, near Lingwu, in Ningxia. The remains were discovered of about seven to ten sauropod skeletons. The excavations and the subsequent preparation were carried out by Wang Haijun, Xiang Lishi, He Sicai, Cao Renfang, Tang Zhilu and Tao Yu.

In 2018, Xu Xing, Paul Upchurch, Philip D. Mannion, Paul M. Barrett, Omar R. Regalado-Fernandez, Mo Jinyou, Ma Jinfu and Liu Hongan named and described the type species Lingwulong shenqi. The generic name combines a reference to Lingwu with the Mandarin long, "dragon". The specific name shenqi (神奇) means "amazing" or "magical" in Mandarin, reflecting the unexpected appearance of a member of the Dicraeosauridae in East Asia, a group never before identified in the region.

The holotype, LM V001a, consists of the rear of a skull associated with a series of dentary teeth found in their original position. It is part of the collection of the Lingwu Museum. The paratype, LGP V001b, is a partial skeleton lacking the skull. It contains the rear vertebrae of the back, the sacrum, the pelvis, the first tail vertebra and elements of the right hindlimb. Paratype and holotype possibly represent a single individual. The paratype is displayed in the Lingwu Geopark.

Several specimens have been referred to the species. IVPP V23704 is a series of twenty-nine dentary teeth. LGP V002 is a partial skeleton including vertebrae of the back and tail, the shoulder girdle, and elements of the forelimbs and pelvis. LGP V003 is a partial skeleton containing a series of vertebrae including dorsals, sacrals and the first two caudals, and both ilia. LGP V004 consists of a front neck vertebra, a front back vertebra and a right shinbone of a small individual. LGP V005 is a partial skeleton containing the sacrum, the pelvis and a series of twenty-five front and middle tail vertebrae. LGP V006 contains neck vertebrae, the shoulder girdle and forelimb elements. Additionally numerous disarticulated bones from the quarries were referred.

== Description ==
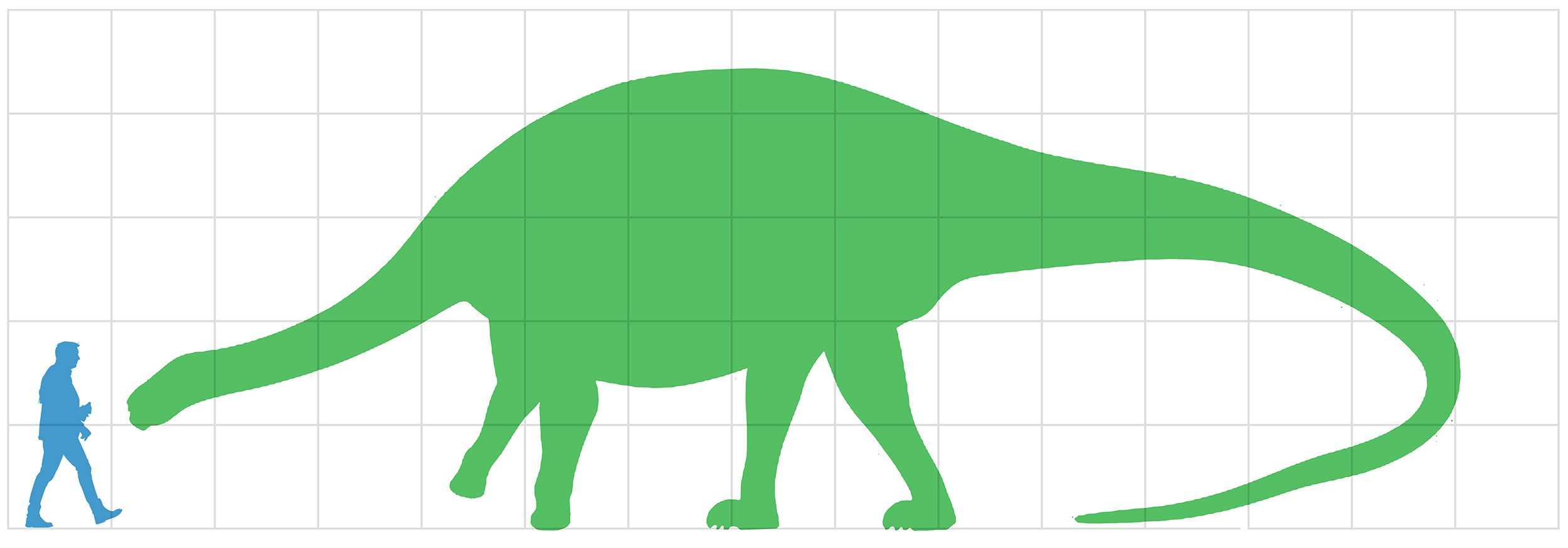
Size diagram of Lingwulong shenqi

Lingwulong's remains belong to 7 to 10 individuals at different ontogenetic stages, and even include skull bones. Overall, nearly the whole skeletal anatomy is known.

Autapomorphies (unique traits) that distinguish Lingwulong from other diplodocoids include highly elaborated ornamentation along the upper margin of the orbital area, occipital condyle with transversely wide articular surface and anterior dorsal vertebrae with slightly twisted metapophyses presenting a sub-circular pseudofacet on their tip.

Some traits, such as morphology of cervical vertebrae metapophyses look intermediate between the derived dicraeosaurids condition and the plesiomorphic condition spread among flagellicaudatans. Unlike most other diplodocoids, which have square-shaped snouts in dorsal view, Lingwulong had a U-shaped snout.

== Classification ==
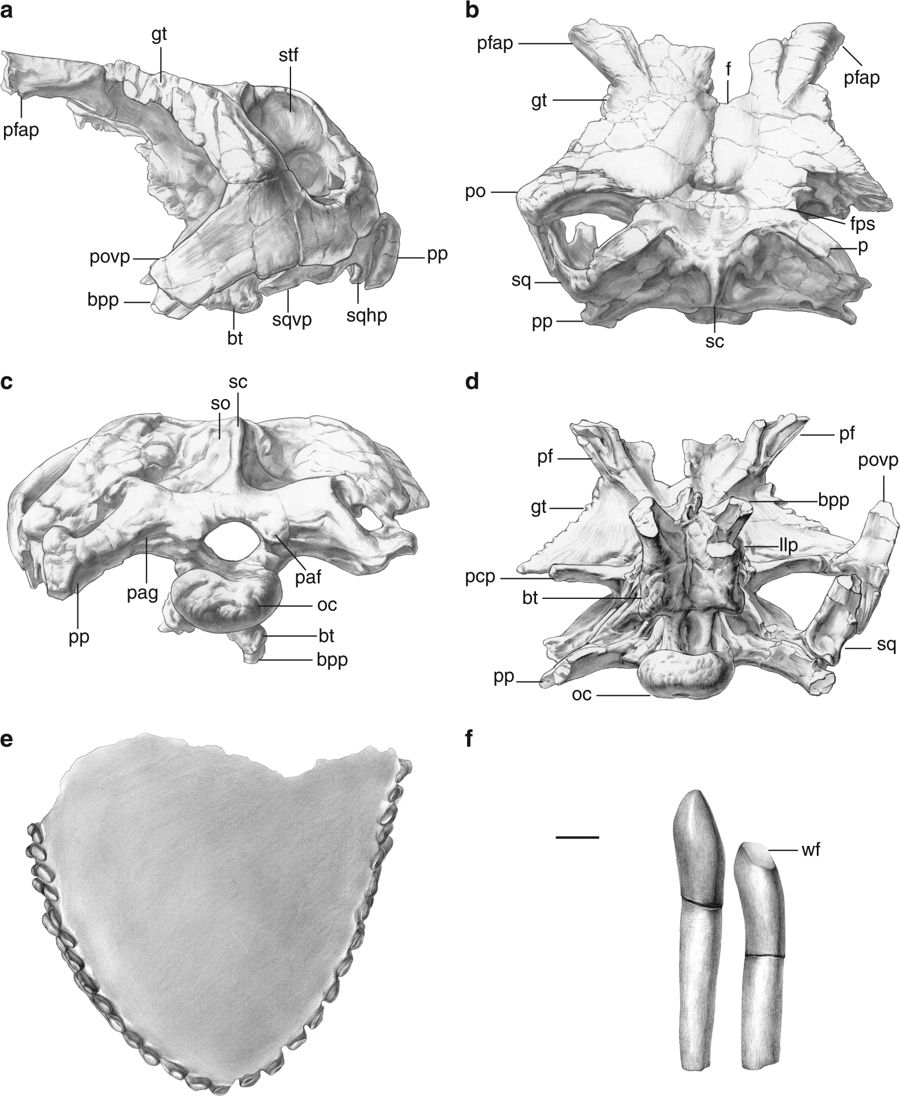
Cranial material

Simplified cladogram of Flagellicaudata after Xu and colleagues (2018) is shown below:

- Flagellicaudata
  - Diplodocidae
  - Dicraeosauridae
    - Suuwassea
    - - Lingwulong
      - - Amargasaurus
        - - Brachytrachelopan
          - Dicraeosaurus

In their 2025 phylogenetic analyses, Mannion and Moore recovered Lingwulong as a sister taxon of Cetiosauriscus, being either outside the clade Flagellicaudata, which contains the Diplodocidae and Dicraeosauridae, or within Diplodocidae.

== Significance ==
=== Geologic age ===
Lingwulong has been considered the earliest known neosauropod and the oldest known diplodocoid. Prior to its discovery, the oldest known possible diplodocoids included "Cetiosaurus" glymptonensis from the late Bathonian and Cetiosauriscus stewarti from the Callovian, both from the United Kingdom. At the time of Lingwulong's naming, it was regarded as having been found in the Yanan Formation. At the time, the age of the Yanan Formation was poorly understood, but was considered highly unlikely to be older than the late Toarcian or younger than the Bajocian, yielding a midpoint age estimate of 174.15 Ma for Lingwulong. Subsequent research on the Yanan Formation dated it more precisely as Aalenian in age, largely between 174.0 and 171.7 Ma. However, the Lingwu dinosaur fauna has been argued to have actually come from the Zhiluo Formation, which would make Lingwulong substantially younger, Bathonian to early Oxfordian in age.

=== Paleobiogeography ===
Diplodocoids were long thought to have been absent from East Asia due to the presence of the Turgai Sea, and the East Asian Isolation Hypothesis was used to explain the presence of mamenchisaurids in East Asia but not elsewhere in the world. The discovery of Lingwulong casts doubt on these paleobiogeographical assumptions by showing that diplodocoids were present in East Asia during the Jurassic.

== See also ==
- 2018 in paleontology
