= Donghe Group =

Geologic formation in China

- Stratigraphic range: Lower Cretaceous
- Type: Geological formation
- Sub-units: Tianjiba Formation, Zhoujiawan Formation, Jishan Formation
- Overlies: Sanhekou Group
- Thickness: 978 metres

Lithology
- Primary: conglomerate
- Other: Sandstone, siltstone, shale

The Donghe Group is a Lower Cretaceous geologic formation in China. Fossil theropod tracks have been reported from the formation. It predominantly consists of conglomerate, alongside sandstone, siltstone and shale.

== See also ==
- List of dinosaur-bearing rock formations
  - List of stratigraphic units with theropod tracks
