= Červený Kostelec =

- Town
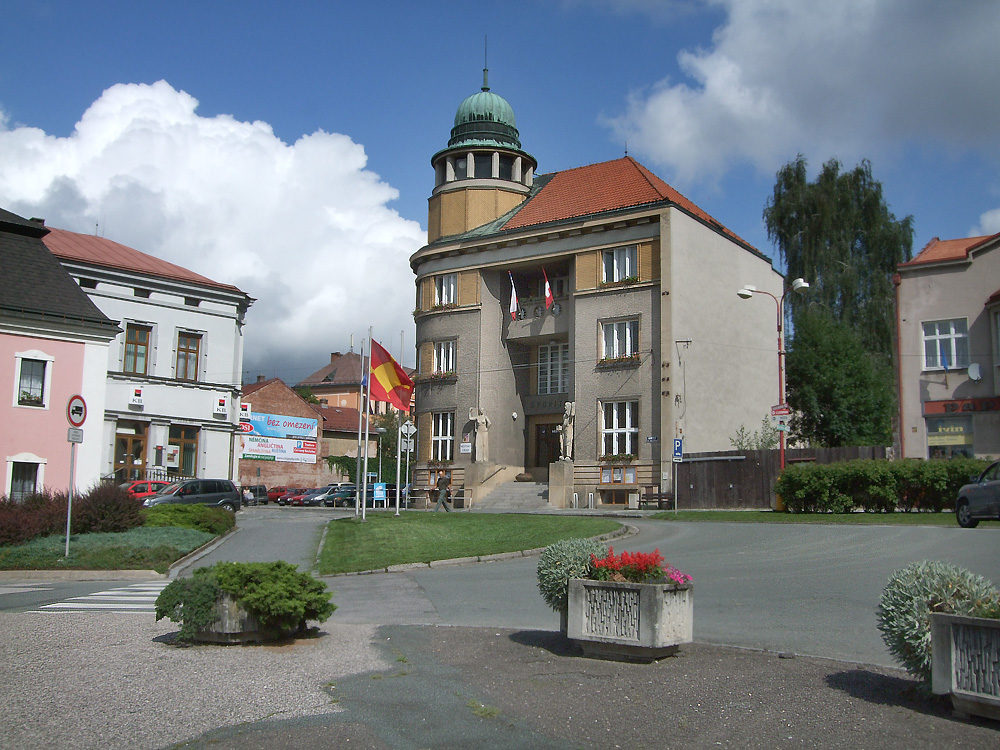
- The square Náměstí T. G. Masaryka

- Flag Coat of arms

- Location in the Czech Republic
- Coordinates: 50°28′35″N 16°5′35″E
- Country: Czech Republic
- Region: Hradec Králové
- District: Náchod
- First mentioned: 1362

Government
  - Mayor: Tomáš Prouza

Area
  - Total: 24.07 km^{2} (9.29 sq mi)
- Elevation: 414 m (1,358 ft)

Population (2026-01-01)
  - Total: 8,202
  - Density: 340.8/km^{2} (882.6/sq mi)
- Time zone: UTC+1 (CET)
  - Summer (DST): UTC+2 (CEST)
- Postal code: 549 41
- Website: www.cervenykostelec.cz

Červený Kostelec (Czech pronunciation: [ˈtʃɛrvɛniː ˈkostɛlɛts]; German: Rothkosteletz) is a town in Náchod District in the Hradec Králové Region of the Czech Republic. It has about 8,200 inhabitants. The town is located on the Olešnice Stream, on the border between the Giant Mountains Foothills and Orlické Foothills.

Červený Kostelec was founded in the 14th century at the latest and became a town in 1876. The main landmark is the Church of Saint James the Great.

== Administrative division ==
Červený Kostelec consists of seven municipal parts (in brackets population according to the 2021 census):

- Červený Kostelec (5,087)
- Bohdašín (213)
- Horní Kostelec (662)
- Lhota za Červeným Kostelcem (1,207)
- Mstětín (34)
- Olešnice (618)
- Stolín (195)

== Etymology ==
The word kostelec is derived from kostel (i.e. 'church') and meant 'fortified church'. To distinguish it from other municipalities with the same name, the prefix červený (i.e. 'red') was added in 1876. It referred to the red Permian formation that was uncovered here, and to the colouring of the local stream, which occurred during floods.

== Geography ==
Červený Kostelec is located about 8 kilometres (5 mi) northwest of Náchod and 34 km (21 mi) northeast of Hradec Králové. It lies on the border between the Giant Mountains Foothills and Orlické Foothills. The highest point is the hill Končinský kopec at 530 m (1,739 ft) above sea level. The Olešnice Stream flows through the town.

== History ==
The first written mention of Kostelec is from 1362. Until 1447, it was a part of the Vízmburk estate. From 1497 at the latest, it belonged to the Náchod estate. It remained so until the establishment of an independent municipality in 1848. The preserved seal proves that Kostelec was referred to as a market town no later than from 1680. In 1876, Kostelec was promoted to a town and changed its name to Červený Kostelec.

== Demographics ==
Historical population

Year	Pop.	±%
1869	6,130	—
1880	6,655	+8.6%
1890	7,485	+12.5%
1900	8,297	+10.8%
1910	8,971	+8.1%

Year	Pop.	±%
1921	7,797	−13.1%
1930	8,660	+11.1%
1950	8,342	−3.7%
1961	8,728	+4.6%
1970	8,726	−0.0%

Year	Pop.	±%
1980	9,196	+5.4%
1991	8,598	−6.5%
2001	8,467	−1.5%
2011	8,272	−2.3%
2021	8,016	−3.1%

Source: Censuses

== Transport ==
The I/14 road (the section from Trutnov to Náchod) runs through the town.

Červený Kostelec is located on the railway line Prague–Trutnov.

== Culture ==
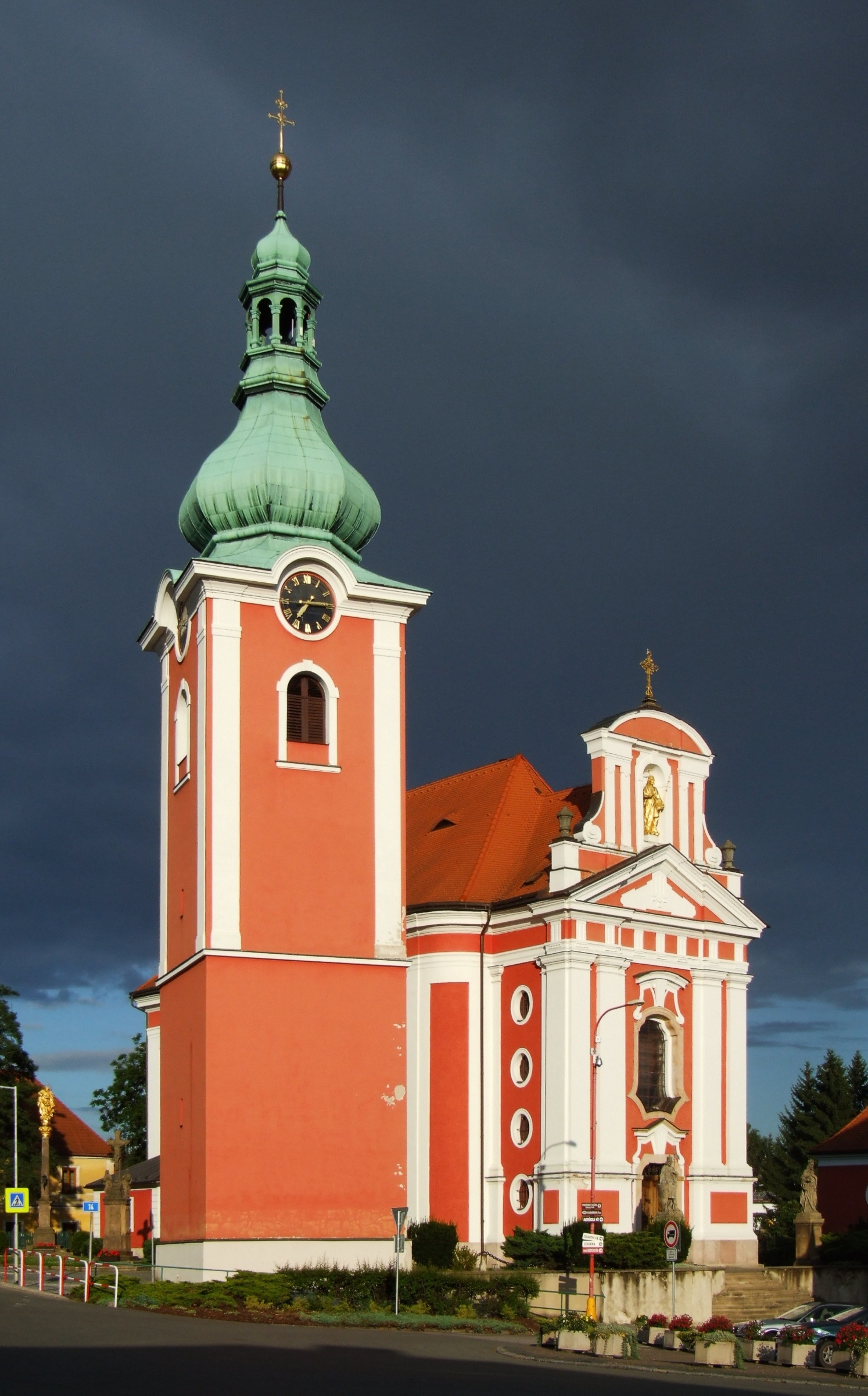
Church of Saint James the Great

Since 1952, the town hosts the annual Červený Kostelec International Folklore Festival.

== Sights ==
The main landmark of Červený Kostelec is the Church of Saint James the Great. It was originally a Gothic building from the 14th century, destroyed by a fire in 1591. It was restored in 1668 and rebuilt in the Baroque style in 1744–1754 based on plans of architect Kilian Ignaz Dientzenhofer.

== Notable people ==
- Martin Růžek (1918–1995), actor
- Viktor Kalabis (1923–2006), composer
- Karel Sedláček (born 1979), darts player

== Twin towns – sister cities ==
Červený Kostelec is twinned with:

- Küsnacht, Switzerland
- Uchte, Germany
- Warrington, England, United Kingdom
- Ząbkowice Śląskie, Poland

== See also ==
- Bohdašín Formation
