= Bell Springs Formation =

Stratigraphic Unit in Wyoming and Utah

- Stratigraphic range: Norian-Rhaetian; ~221–202 Ma
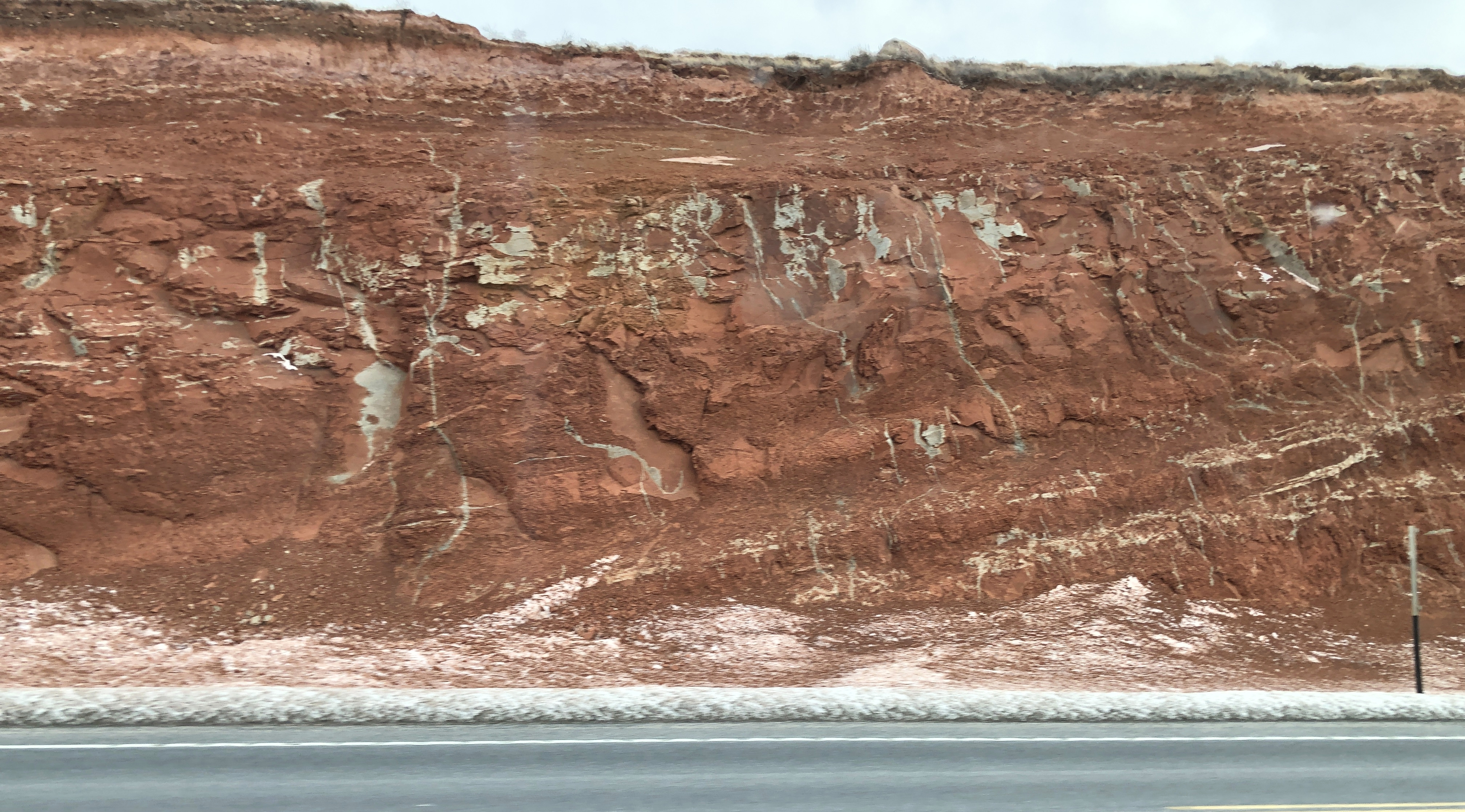
- Type: Geological formation

Lithology
- Primary: Sandstone

Location
- Coordinates: 43.0°N 108.8°W
- Approximate paleocoordinates: 19.2°N 46.4°W
- Region: Wyoming
- Country: United States
- Bell Springs Formation (the United States) Bell Springs Formation (Wyoming)

The Bell Springs is a member of the Nugget Sandstone in Wyoming and a formation in Utah. It is a Late Triassic (Norian to Rhaetian) Fossil theropod tracks assigned to Agialopous wyomingensis have been reported from the formation.

The formation composed of very fine grained limy sandstone that is distinguished from upper part of Nugget by presence of red to purple-red shale and lime cemented siltstone in beds less than 0.1 ft thick and by presence of calcareous firmly indurated beds 1–4 ft thick that are ripple laminated and weather to square faced ledges. May correlate with upper part of Chinle Formation.

== See also ==
- List of dinosaur-bearing rock formations
  - List of stratigraphic units with theropod tracks
