= Stockton Beds =

- Type: Geological formation

Location
- Region: New York State
- Country: United States

The Stockton Beds is a Mesozoic geologic formation in the northeastern United States. Fossil theropod tracks have been reported from the formation.

== See also ==
- List of dinosaur-bearing rock formations
  - List of stratigraphic units with theropod tracks
