= Heichengtzu Series =

- Type: Geological formation

Location
- Country: China

The Heichengtzu Series is a Mesozoic geologic formation in China. Fossil theropod tracks have been reported from the formation.

== See also ==
- List of dinosaur-bearing rock formations
  - List of stratigraphic units with theropod tracks
