= Chilgog Formation =

Geologic formation in South Korea

- Stratigraphic range: Albian 108.7–106.0 Ma
- Type: Geological formation
- Unit of: Hayang Group
- Underlies: Silla Conglomerate
- Overlies: Jinju Formation
- Thickness: Up to 650 m (2,130 ft); 295 m (968 ft) in the western Daegu area

Lithology
- Primary: Sandstone, mudstone, conglomerate
- Other: Tuff

Location
- Coordinates: 36.0°N 128.5°E
- Approximate paleocoordinates: 40.9°N 128.3°E
- Region: Gyeongsangbuk-do
- Country: South Korea
- Extent: Gyeongsang Basin

Type section
- Named for: Chilgok
- Named by: Tateiwa, 1929
- Chilgog Formation (South Korea)

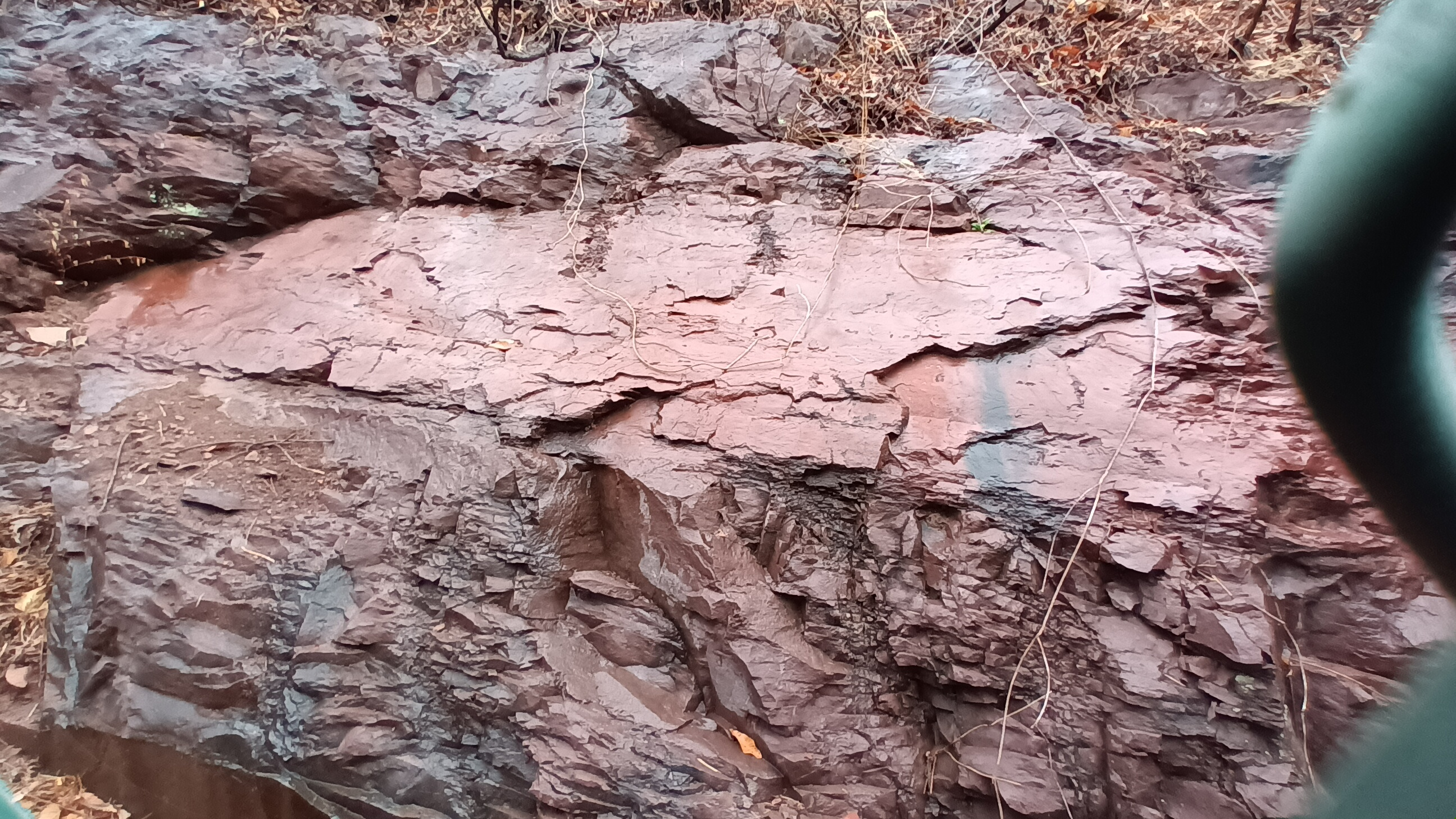

The Chilgog Formation (Korean: 칠곡층; Hanja: 漆谷層; RR: Chilgok-cheung), also known as the Chilgok Formation, is an Lower Cretaceous geologic formation in South Korea. Formerly dated to the Berriasian to Hauterivian, later dating has established an Albian age. Dinosaur remains from this formation are actually from the Iljig Formation, which correlates with the lower part of the Chilgog Formation.

== Description ==
The formation predominantly consists of sandstone, mudstone and conglomerate, with subordinate tuff and other volcanics. It overlies the Jinju Formation and underlies the Silla Conglomerate, which underlies the Haman Formation, respectively.

== See also ==
- ko:경상 분지 (Gyeongsang Basin)
- List of dinosaur-bearing rock formations
  - List of stratigraphic units with indeterminate dinosaur fossils
