= Plattensandstein =

Geologic formation

- Stratigraphic range: Anisian; ~247–242 Ma
- Type: Geological formation
- Unit of: Upper Buntsandstein
- Underlies: Röt Formation

Lithology
- Primary: Sandstone
- Other: Mudstone

Location
- Coordinates: 47.6°N 7.8°E
- Approximate paleocoordinates: 12.8°N 18.8°E
- Country: Germany, Switzerland
- Plattensandstein (Germany)

The Plattensandstein is a Middle Triassic (Anisian) geologic formation in southern Germany and northern Switzerland. Fossil theropod tracks have been reported from the formation.

Plattensandstein is used in Germany as a natural building stone. It derives its name from the fact that it is usually fissile into slabs with a thickness of several centimeters.

== Fossil content ==
The formation has provided fossils of:

- Basileosaurus freyi
- Sclerosaurus armatus

== See also ==
- List of dinosaur-bearing rock formations
  - List of stratigraphic units with theropod tracks
- Flagstone, another scissile sandstone, which is used as a roofing material
