= Iljig Formation =

Geologic formation in South Korea

- Stratigraphic range: Albian
- Type: Geological formation
- Unit of: Hayang Group
- Underlies: Hupyeongdong Formation
- Overlies: Jinju Formation

Location
- Region: North Gyeongsang Province
- Country: South Korea

The Iljig Formation (Korean: 일직층; Hanja: 一直層) is a Lower Cretaceous geologic formation in South Korea. It partially correlates with the lower part of the Chilgog Formation.

== See also ==
- List of dinosaur-bearing rock formations
  - List of stratigraphic units with indeterminate dinosaur fossils
