= Haman Formation =

Early Cretaceous geological formation in South Korea

- Stratigraphic range: Albian-Cenomanian; ~105.4–95.7 Ma
- Type: Geological formation
- Unit of: Hayang Group
- Underlies: Jindong & Banyawol Formations
- Overlies: Silla Conglomerate, Hagbong volcanics

Lithology
- Primary: Sandstone
- Other: Siltstone, shale

Location
- Coordinates: 35.8°N 128.8°E
- Approximate paleocoordinates: 44.4°N 125.2°E
- Region: Gyeongsangnam-do
- Country: South Korea
- Extent: Gyeongsang Basin
- Haman Formation (South Korea)

The Haman Formation (Korean: 함안층; Hanja: 咸安層; RR: Ham-an-cheung) is a Cretaceous geological formation in South Korea. It is dated to the Albian-Cenomanian stages, between 105.4 ± 0.4 Ma and 95.7 ± 0.6 Ma. The deposit is known for its tracks, including those of dinosaurs, pterosaurs and birds. It overlies the Silla Conglomerate which overlies the Chilgok Formation. It is laterally equivalent to the Sagog Formation.

== Vertebrate paleofauna ==
Fossil pterosaur, theropod, sauropod and ornithopod tracks have been recovered from this formation. Some scratch marks made by theropod tracemakers show signs of avian-like courtship display behavior. Dinosaur skin impressions have also been found in this formation.

=== Ichnofossils ===
Ichnofossils of the Haman Formation
| Ichnogenus | Ichnospecies | Region | Member | Material | Notes | Image |
| Pteraichnus | P. isp. | Namhae | | | Pterosaur track, showing swimming traces. Haman specimens housed at Korea National University of Education, Cheongwongun, South Korea. | |
| Dromaeosauripus | D. hamanensis | Namhae | | | Dromaeosaur track, belonging to a 70 cm (28 in) tall individual. | |
| Neosauroides | N. koreanensis | | | | Lizard trackway | |
| Koreanaornis | K. hamanensis | Haman and Jinju | | | Bird track; the first vertebrate ichnotaxon reported from South Korea. | |
| Caririchnium | C. isp. | | | | Juvenile ornithopod tracks, belonging to either derived iguanodonts or basal hadrosauroids. The trackmakers' hip heights are estimated between 76.4 and 102.1 cm (30.1 and 40.2 in). | |
| Minisauripus | M. cf. zhenshuonani or M. cf. chuanzhuensis | Namhae | | | One of the smallest known theropod tracks. | |
| Ignotornis | I. yangi; I. gajinensis | Namhae (I. yangi) and Jinju (I. gajinensis) | | | The oldest known web-footed bird tracks. I. gajinensis shows feeding traces. | |
| Brontopodus | B. birdi | Namhae | | | Sauropod tracks | |
| Gyeongsangsauropus | G. pentadactylus | Jinju | | | Sauropod tracks, previously assigned to the ichnogenus Brontopodus | |
| Batrachopus | B. cf. grandis | Namhae | | | B. grandis is the archosaur track made by either a bipedal crocodylomorph or therizinosaur. Specimen from Haman Formation was originally assigned to pterosaur trackway ichnotaxon Haenamichnus gainensis. | |
| Grallator | | Sacheon | | | Theropod track | |

== See also ==
- Cretaceous Asia
- List of fossil sites
- Geoncheonri Formation
- Gugyedong Formation
- Hasandong Formation
- Jinju Formation
