= Caiuá Formation =

Geologic formation in Brazil and Paraguay

- Stratigraphic range: Barremian-Aptian; ~130–120 Ma
- Type: Geological formation
- Unit of: Bauru Group
- Underlies: Santo Anastácio Formation
- Overlies: Serra Geral Formation

Lithology
- Primary: Sandstone

Location
- Coordinates: 22.0°S 53.0°W
- Region: Paraná
- Country: Brazil; Paraguay
- Extent: Paraná Basin
- Caiuá Formation (Brazil)

The Caiuá Formation is an Early Cretaceous geologic formation in Brazil and Paraguay. Fossil theropod tracks have been reported from the formation. The formation, the lowermost unit of the Bauru Group, was deposited in the Barremian and Aptian epochs of the Early Cretaceous, around 130 to 120 Ma. The formation is unconformably overlain by the Santo Anastácio Formation and the unconformity probably represents the start of the opening of the South Atlantic and the formation of the Santos Basin.

== See also ==
- List of dinosaur-bearing rock formations
  - List of stratigraphic units with theropod tracks
- List of fossiliferous stratigraphic units in Paraguay
