= Bohdašín Formation =

- Stratigraphic range: Norian; ~210 Ma
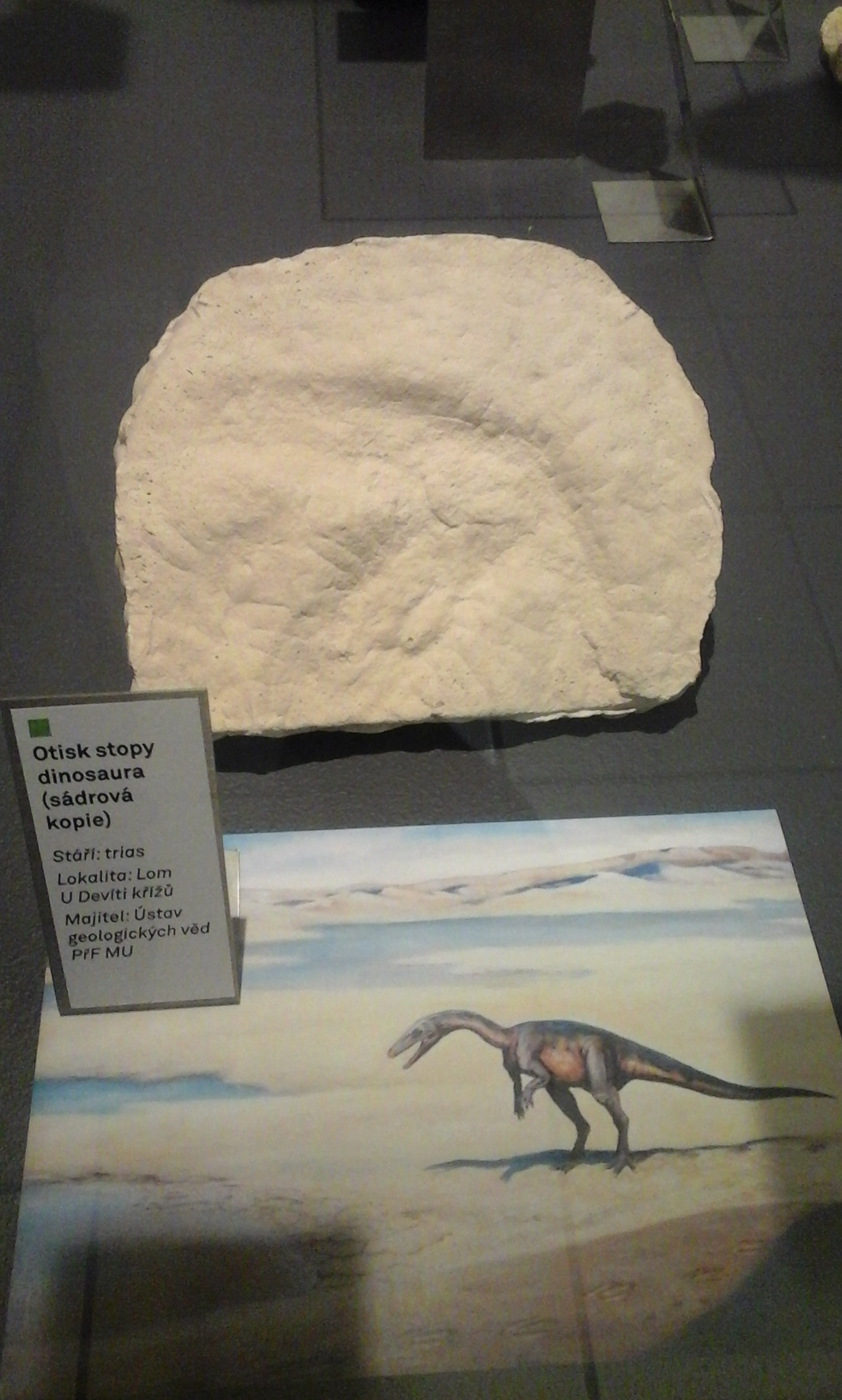
- Cast of a tridactyl footprint of "Eubrontes" from the Triassic of the Czech Republic (sandstone quarry near Červený Kostelec)
- Type: Geological formation

Lithology
- Primary: Sandstone

Location
- Region: Červený Kostelec
- Country: Czech Republic
- Extent: Prague Basin

The Bohdašín Formation (Czech: Bohdašínské souvrství) is a geologic unit of Late Triassic age (about 210 Ma), located in the Czech Republic. A small tridactyl footprint of a coelophysoid theropod or an indeterminate dinosauromorph was found around 1995 near Červený Kostelec in these strata. It was classified as ichnogenus Eubrontes. In 2011, another dinosaur footprint was discovered (in Botanical garden of Prague, but on the stone slab carried from this quarry), this time classified as ichnogenus Anomoepus.
