= Hopiichnus =

Trace fossil classification
- Domain: Eukaryota
- Kingdom: Animalia
- Phylum: Chordata
- Clade: Dinosauria
- Clade: †Ornithischia
- Ichnofamily: †Anomoepidae
- Ichnogenus: †Hopiichnus; Welles, 1971

Dinosaur footprint

Hopiichnus is an ichnogenus of dinosaur footprint. It is probably synonymous with Anomoepus.

== See also ==
- List of dinosaur ichnogenera
