= Jingchuan Formation =

Geologic formation in China

- Stratigraphic range: Barremian; ~125–120 Ma
- Type: Geological formation
- Unit of: Zhidan Group

Lithology
- Primary: Sandstone
- Other: Mudstone

Location
- Coordinates: 38.9°N 107.3°E
- Approximate paleocoordinates: 40.0°N 109.0°E
- Region: Inner Mongolia
- Country: China
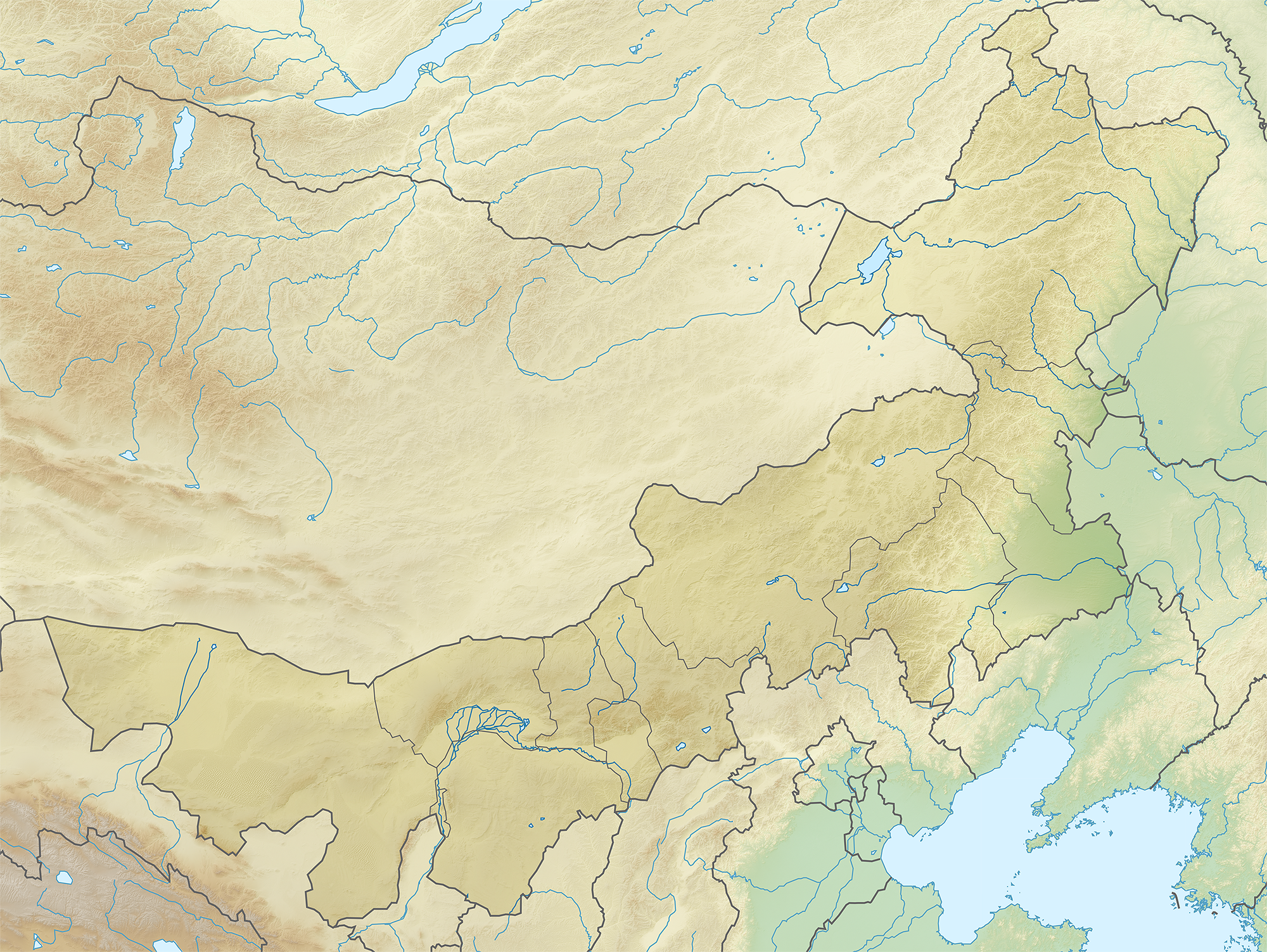
- Jingchuan Formation (China) Jingchuan Formation (Inner Mongolia)

The Jingchuan Formation is a Barremian geologic formation in China. Various dinosaur fossils and tracks have been reported from the formation.

== Vertebrate paleofauna ==
- Wuerhosaurus
- Psittacosaurus
- Sinornithoides
- Hadrosauridae indet. fragmentary fossils
- Sauropod indet. footprints
- Theropod indet. footprints

== See also ==
- List of dinosaur-bearing rock formations
  - List of stratigraphic units with theropod tracks
