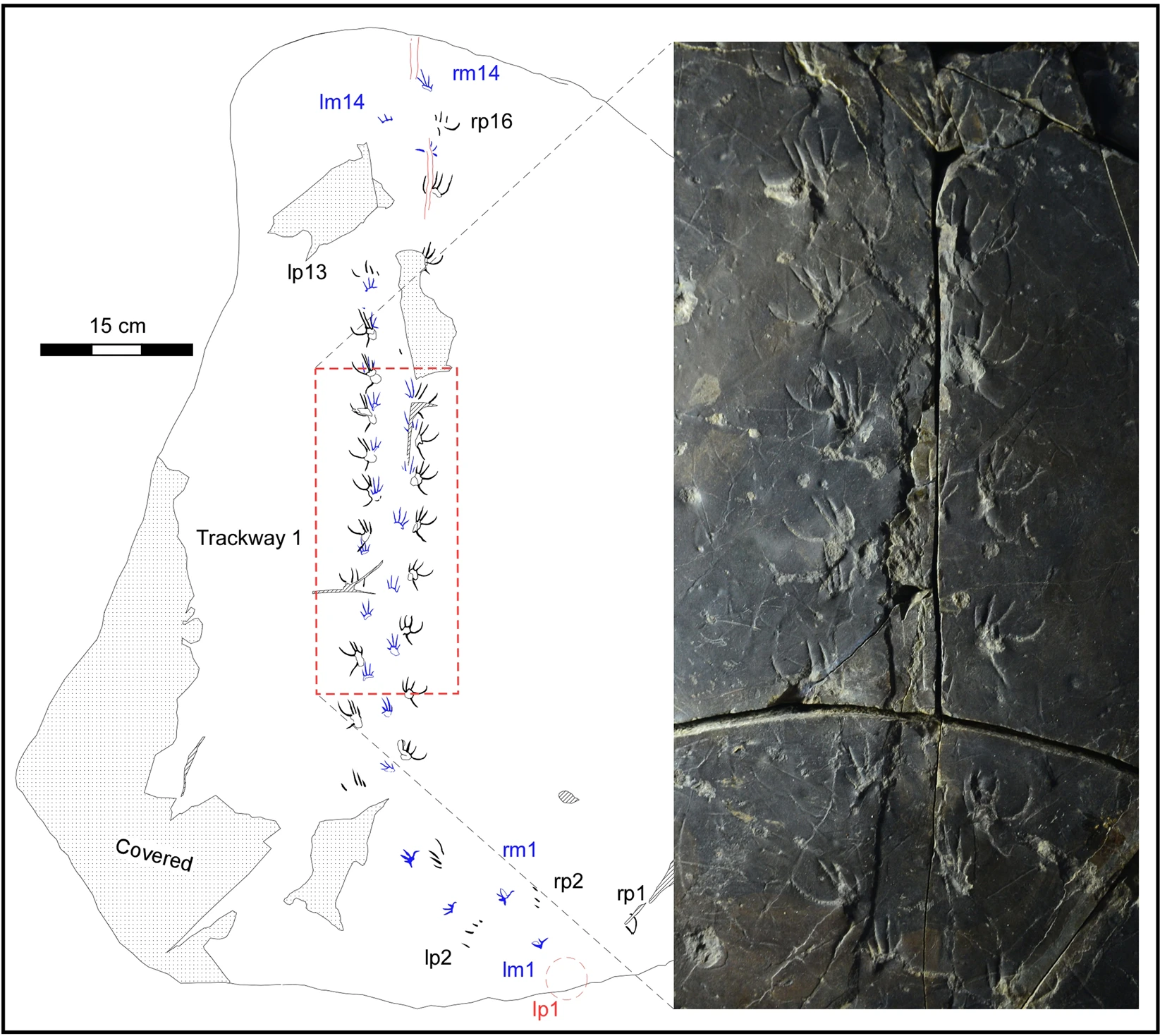
- Holotype of Neosauroides innovatus

Trace fossil classification
- Ichnogenus: Neosauroides; Kim et al., 2017

Type ichnospecies
- †Neosauroides koreaensis Kim et al., 2017

Other ichnospecies
- †N. innovatus Kim et al., 2019

= Neosauroides =

Neosauroides Temporal range: Albian–Calabrian

Trace fossil

Neosauroides is an ichnogenus of probable scincid lizard mainly known from the Early Cretaceous (Albian) of South Korea. The ichnogenus contains two named ichnospecies, N. koreanensis and N. innovatus, representing the first lizard trackway reported from the Cretaceous period.

== Discovery and naming ==
The ichnogenus Neosauroides means "new reptile" due to its novelty for being the only known lizard trackway from the Cretaceous period at the time of its initial description, and the type ichnospecies N. koreanensis from the Haman Formation is named in reference to Korea. The second ichnospecies N. innovatus from the Jinju Formation, representing the largest known Cretaceous lizard trackway, is named in reference to the Jinju Innovation City. Trace fossils identified as an indeterminate ichnospecies of Neosauroides have been discovered from the Lower Cretaceous Hekou Group of China, and from the lower Pleistocene (Calabrian) Bacons Castle Formation of the United States.

== Classification ==
The trackmaker of Neosauroides is probably a lizard, but its taxonomic identity is uncertain. The original description of N. koreanensis did not assign this ichnotaxon to a specific clade, while the describers of N. innovatus included Neosauroides within the infraclass Lepidosauromorpha which includes all reptiles closer to lizards than archosaurs such as crocodilians and birds. The authors also considered the other lizard ichnotaxon from the Hasandong Formation (Aptian) of South Korea, Sauripes hadongensis, as a potential nomen dubium due to insufficient description and problematic holotype designation, which would make Neosauroides to be the only valid Cretaceous lizard ichnotaxon.

In 2021, Weems suggested that Neosauroides represents skink tracks based on an isolated footprint identified as N. isp. from the Early Pleistocene of the United States, the only record of this ichnogenus outside Cretaceous East Asia. As of 2024, the oldest known skink Electroscincus zedi is reported from the Late Cretaceous (Cenomanian) Burmese amber, slightly younger than the Albian-aged Haman and Jinju Formation.
