= Röt Formation =

Geologic formation in Germany

- Stratigraphic range: Anisian (Aegean or Bithynian); ~247–242 Ma
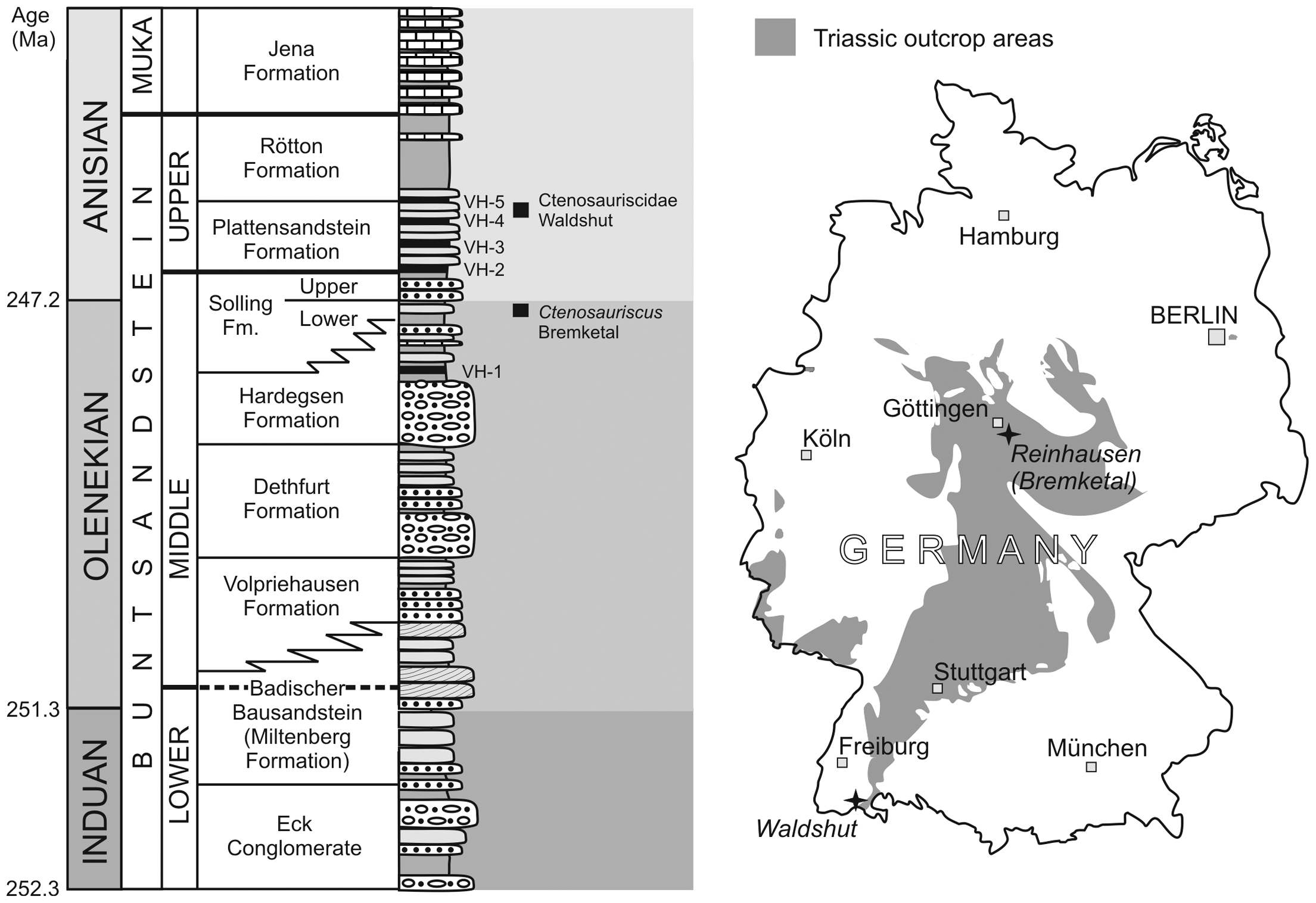
- Stratigraphy and extent of the Triassic in Germany
- Type: Formation
- Unit of: Buntsandstein
- Sub-units: Violet Horizon 5 Member
- Underlies: Jena Formation
- Overlies: Plattensandstein & Solling Formations

Lithology
- Primary: Limestone, mudstone, shale
- Other: Sandstone

Location
- Coordinates: 51.5°N 11.9°E
- Approximate paleocoordinates: 17.5°N 19.7°E
- Region: Sachsen-Anhalt, Baden-Württemberg, Bavaria, Hessen
- Country: Germany
- Extent: Central Germany
- Röt Formation (Germany)

The Röt Formation or Rötton Formation (German for Röt Shale), or Upper Buntsandstein, is a geologic formation of the Buntsandstein in Germany. It preserves fossils dating back to the Middle Triassic Epoch (Anisian or Aegean or Bithynian in the regional stratigraphy). The formation overlies the Plattenstein and Solling Formations and is overlain by the Jena Formation.

The limestones, mudstones, shales and sandstones of the formation, deposited in a shallow marine environment, have provided fossils of early archosaurs, temnospondyls, fish and insects.

== Fossil content ==
The formation has provided the following fossils:

Group	Taxa	Notes	Images
Temnospondyls	Eocyclotosaurus woschmidti		
Temnospondyls	Heptasaurus cappelensis (described as Mastodonsaurus cappelensis)		
Temnospondyls	Capitosauria indet.		
Reptiles	Amotosaurus rotfeldensis		
Reptiles	Cymatosaurus erikae		
Reptiles	C. erytheus		
Reptiles	C. fridericianus		
Reptiles	Eifelosaurus triadicus		
Reptiles	Sclerosaurus armatus		
Reptiles	Ctenosauriscidae indet.		
Fish	Selachii indet.		
Insects	Rhoeniella granulata		

== Correlations ==
Based on the fossils of early archosaurs, the formation is correlated with the Donguz Formation of Russia, the upper Heshanggou Formation of China and the Holbrook Member of the Moenkopi Formation of Arizona.

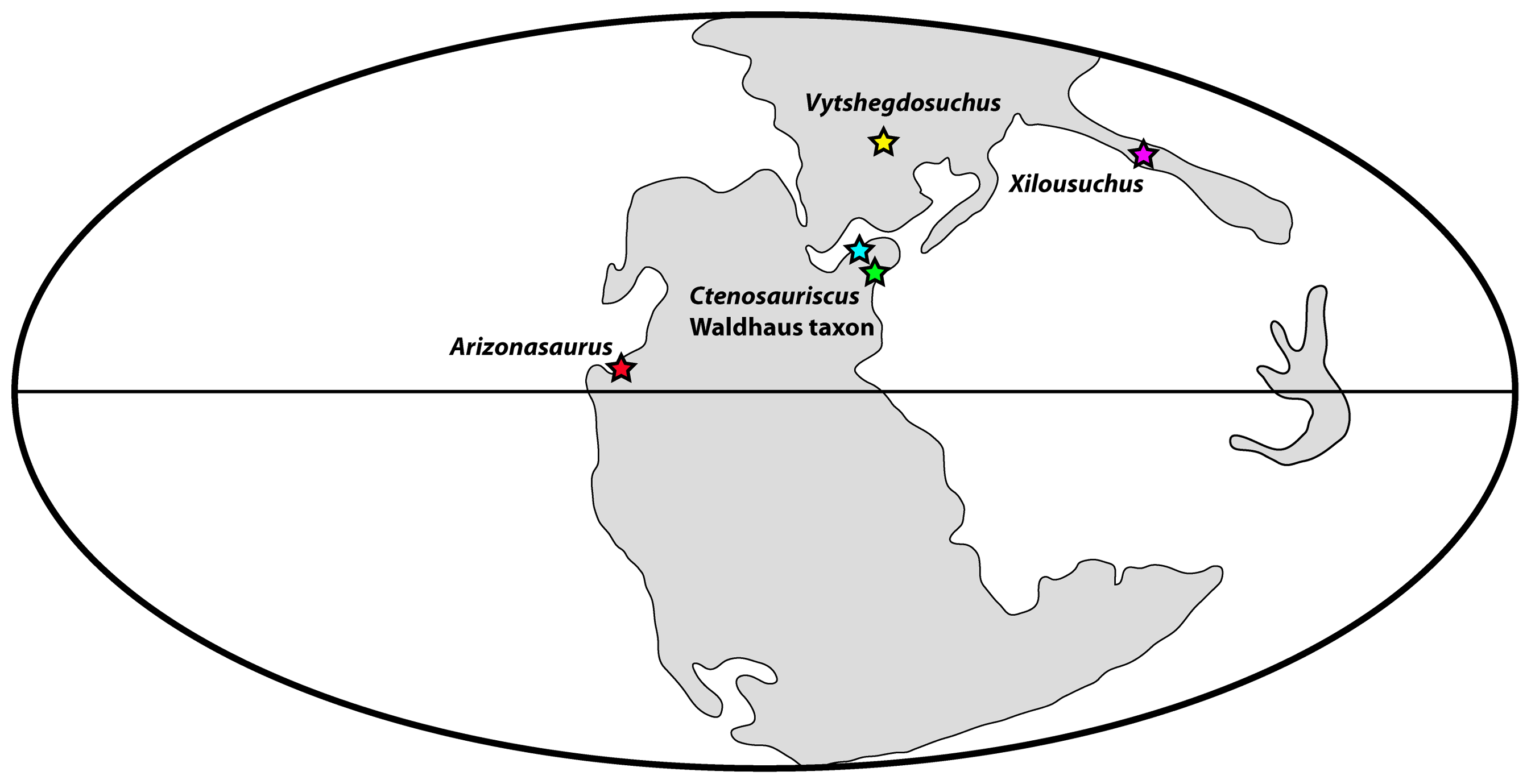
Paleogeography of the Early Triassic with archosaur fossil finds

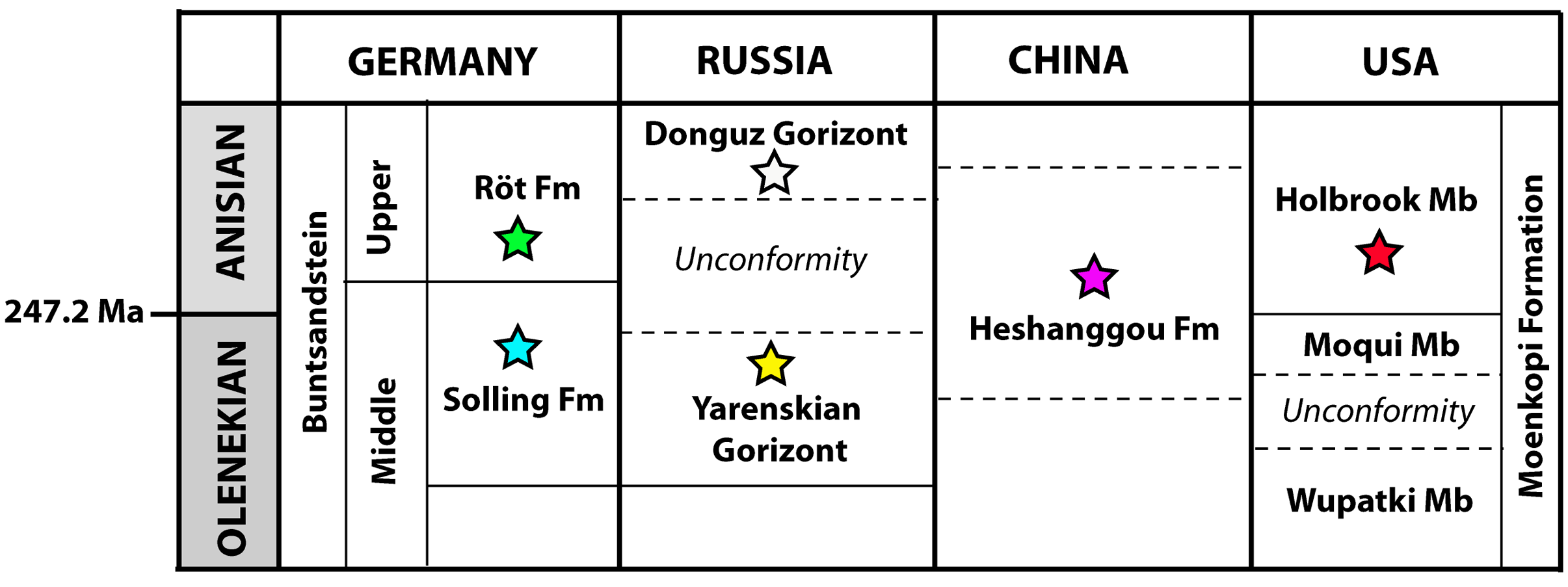
Early Triassic formations with archosaur fossil finds

== See also ==
- List of fossiliferous stratigraphic units in Germany
- Anisian formations
  - Besano Formation, fossiliferous formation of the Alps
  - Manda Formation, fossiliferous formation of Tanzania
  - Omingonde Formation, fossiliferous formation of Namibia
