= Fort Terrett Formation =

- Type: Geological formation

Location
- Region: Texas
- Country: United States

The Fort Terrett Formation is a Mesozoic geologic formation in Texas. Fossil theropod tracks have been reported from the formation.

== See also ==
- List of dinosaur-bearing rock formations
  - List of stratigraphic units with theropod tracks
