= Moyeni =

- Location within KwaZulu-Natal Location within South Africa
- Coordinates: 28.724°S 29.186°E
- Country: South Africa
- Province: KwaZulu-Natal
- District: uThukela
- Municipality: Okhahlamba

Area
  - Total: 12.55 km^{2} (4.85 sq mi)

Population (2011)
  - Total: 2,421
  - Density: 192.9/km^{2} (499.6/sq mi)

Racial makeup (2011)
  - Black African: 100.0%

First languages (2011)
  - Zulu: 97.4%
  - S. Ndebele: 1.5%
  - Other: 1.1%
- Time zone: UTC+2 (SAST)

Moyeni is a village in Bergville, in the KwaZulu-Natal province of South Africa.
