= Liselle Terret =

British academic and neo-burlesque performer

- Employer: University of East London
- Website: www.uel.ac.uk/staff/t/liselle-terret

Liselle Terret (also known as Doris La Trine) is a co-programme leader and a senior lecturer at the University of East London. She has more than twenty years of experience within the field as a teacher, facilitator and manager of Applied Theatre related projects within and outside of the UK working with a diverse selection of groups.

== Career ==
Terret has worked as a teacher, lecturer and with numerous companies such as Half Moon Young People's Theatre Company, Unicorn Theatre, Pascal Theatre, Graeae Theatre and formed Unmask Theatre with Vishni Velada Billson. In her theatrical performances, Terret performs as Doris La Trine. Her theatrical work as Doris La Trine develops a neo-burlesque persona, and she often "shares the stage with Len – the pink custom built toilet." In recent years Liselle created and directed the show Not F**kin' Sorry at the Soho Theatre. It was described as "An evening of shameless sexy punk crip cabaret. With luscious lip syncs, sweaty dances and verbatim stories, have your preconceptions rattled as we take you to the edge."

=== Lecturing and teaching career ===
Terret's career began as a drama teacher and then moved to fulfilling a role within a special education school. Following this she took a role at the Central School of Speech and Drama leading a Performance Making Diploma for learning disabled students. The diploma was a partnership with Access All Areas a company that makes urban, disruptive performance with learning disabled and autistic artists. Their role at the Central School of Speech and Drama spanned eight years. The Performance Making Diploma program won the 2015 The Guardian University Award for Student Diversity and Widening Participation.

Furthering their role within the educational system she took a role at Coventry University teaching Applied Theatre as a senior lecturer before taking up her current role at the University of East London. Her role at the University of East London has enabled the university to create partnerships with companies they have worked with such as the Half Moon Young People's Theatre Company.

=== Half Moon Young People's Theatre Company ===
Terret's career at Half Moon ran from 1998 until early 2000s. While working at Half Moon she was Education Officer.

=== Not F**kin' Sorry ===
Not F**kin Sorry was performed at the Soho Theatre in November 2019. Directed and Created By Liselle Terret Not F**kin' Sorry is a piece of "shameless sexy punk crip cabaret. With luscious lip syncs, sweaty dances and verbatim stories, have your preconceptions rattled as we take you to the edge." The show in inclusive and aims to challenge the stigmas and stereotypes surrounding disability. The message behind the shows satirical nature shows the terrifying amount of Hate crime and abuse that takes place in Britain towards disabled people. Reviewer Natasha Sutton Williams says "Through an inspired Countdown satire, the show tackles disability hate and mate crime, detailing three descriptions of recent victims' experiences. As the game show host, performer Emma Selwyn read out an extensive list of disabled people who have been victimised by hate and mate crime in 2019." The hard hitting nature of the piece mixed with the comedic flare makes for a brilliant performance full of funny, thought provoking and transformative moments. Williams quotes "These four performers are some of the bravest, boldest, most candid and risk-taking on the contemporary London theatre scene. Due credit must also be given to director Liselle Terret and dramaturg Lou Cope for their meticulous work, curating highly emotive and genuinely provocative content from the devising process, and balancing the show’s sorrows and joys with such finesse." The show was a success and showed a vast amount of representation on stage. Terret's commitment for representation and inclusivity for all shines through her work on the production Not F**kin' Sorry. Lyn Gardner a writer for The Guardian says "True diversity in British theatre is scandalously overdue. It will bring huge benefits both creatively and organisationally, but I’ve long argued that until we get over a tick-box mentality in the arts nothing is going to really change, and that British theatre risks becoming increasingly irrelevant." Terret's work highlights the creatives working on making Britains theatre more diverse. Her work is telling stories that need to be told and highlighting new performers to British audiences. The lack of representation in British Theatre is shocking and The stage revealed in 2018 "just 1% of graduates from major drama schools declared a physical impairment – covering mobility, sight or hearing impairments. The most up-to-date government figures, from 2016, state that 11% of people in the general population declared a mobility impairment, 3% declared a vision impairment and 3% had a hearing impairment." Terret's work on this show clearly made an impact on British Theatre and it also made a huge impact for those who are under represented within it. Williams notes at the end of the review "The message of Not F**kin Sorry is crystalline, and cannot be put better than when Selwyn declares, 'We are sick of being your circus dogs. Everything you think we can’t do, we can. And we are not f**ing sorry.'"

== Writing ==
Terret's published written work has spanned over a decade. They have written multiple pieces for the Research in Drama Education: The Journal of Applied Theatre and Performance. Pieces such as Theatre in Health Care, The Boy in the Dress: queering Mantle of the Expert and Move Over, There's Room Enough: Performance Making Diploma: training for learning disabled adults. These pieces were published online from 2012 to 2015. As well as this they also wrote a chapter in a book written by Sheila Preston called Applied Theatre: Facilitation Pedagogies, Practices, Resilience. Their chapter Repositioning the Learning- Disabled Performing Arts Student as Critical Facilitator explores difficulties learning disabled students face within higher education.
