= Segovia Formation, Texas =

Segovia Formation
- Stratigraphic range: Cretaceous
- Type: Geological formation
- Unit of: Edwards Group

Lithology
- Primary: Limestone

Location
- Region: Texas

The Segovia Formation is a Cretaceous geologic formation. Fossil theropod tracks have been reported from the formation.

== See also ==
- List of dinosaur-bearing rock formations
  - List of stratigraphic units with theropod tracks
