= Keith Terrett =

British musician, composer, and educator (born 1956)

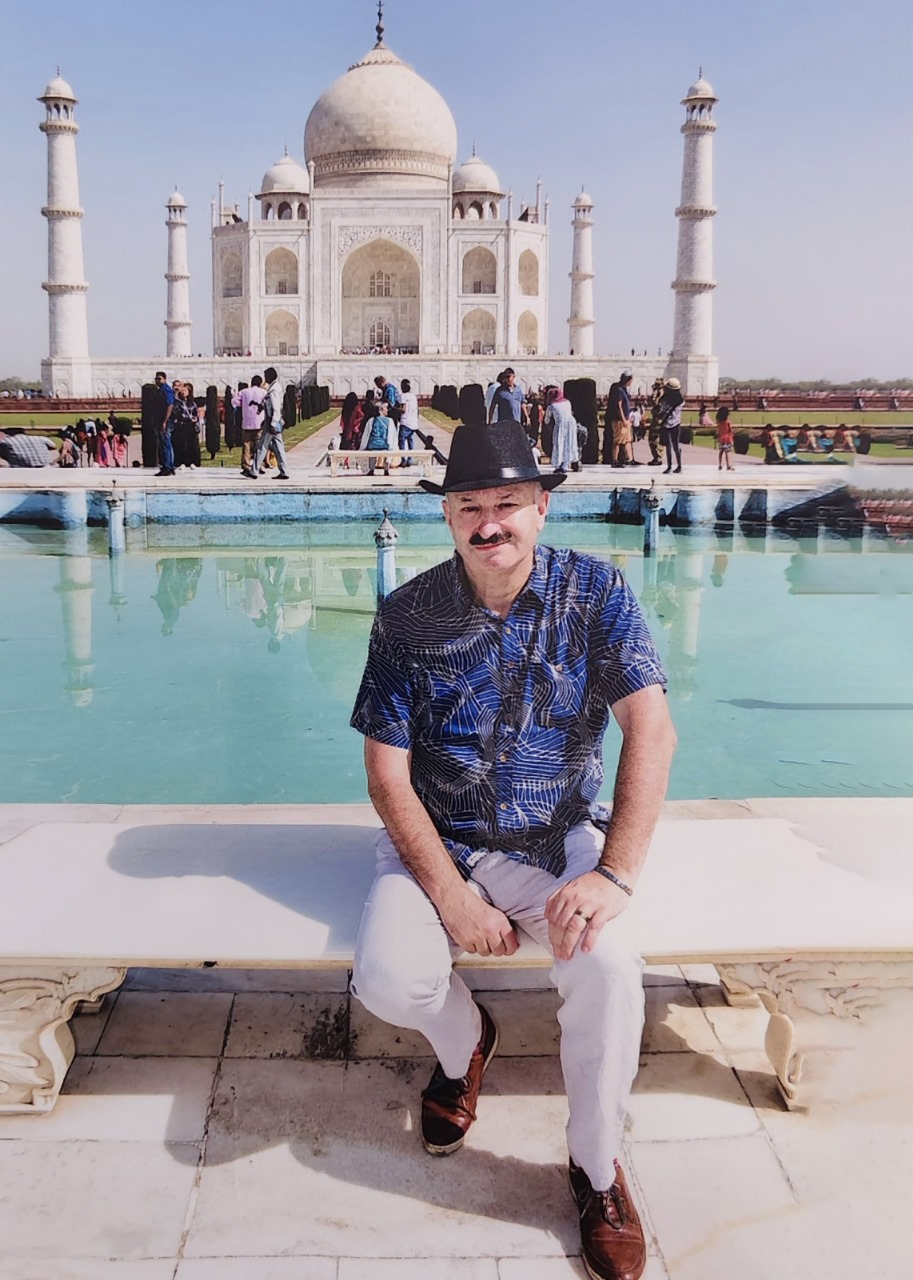
- Born: London, United Kingdom
- Known for: Musician, Composer, and Educator

Keith Terrett (born April 6, 1956) is a British musician, composer, and educator known for his musical compositions, arranging, wind band conducting and his complete set of national anthems from Aruba to Zambia.

== Early life and education ==
Keith Terrett obtained a Master's Degree in Sacred Musical Composition from Johann Heinrich Pestalozzi Christian University in 2021. He also earned fellowship diplomas in composition from the London College of Music, Victoria College of Music, Three Counties School of Music, and The Northern Midland College of Music during 2022. In the past, he used to teach at an IB school in India - PSG Clifton International School (Previously Pathways School Gurgaon).

== Career ==
Terrett appeared on "This Is Your Life" for Sir George Solti's 85th birthday, performing "Happy Birthday" on trumpet. In 1986, he was featured on a Welsh breakfast show, performing with a jazz combo from Kneller Hall.

His performances were also featured in an ABC Australia film with the Band of the Royal Papua New Guinea Constabulary at the 1996 Sensational Adelaide Tattoo, where he served as Principal Director of Music.

His 1998 tour to Japan, which included a series of charity concerts in Kobe and Osaka with the Constabulary Band, raised money for the Aitape Tsunami Relief Fund. These funds were donated to the PNG Red Cross in Port Moresby.

During his career, he has performed with many artists and orchestras including Harry Mortimer, Martin Mailman, Kenny Baker, Don Lusher, Geoffrey Brand, Jesse Norman, Iona Brown, Engelbert Humperdink, Sir John Pritchard, London & BBC Concert & Symphony Orchestras and the Kneller Hall Band under the baton of Frank Renton.

In March 2022, Moscow-born pianist Petr Limonov, conducted a Flash Mob orchestra of 200 musicians in Trafalgar Square to protest the Russia-Ukraine war. The performers played a series of Ukrainian songs including the Ukrainian national anthem in a version arranged by Terrett which has now become the standard version world-wide.
