= Jindong Formation =

Geologic formation in Korea

- Stratigraphic range: Cenomanian-Turonian; ~100–93 Ma
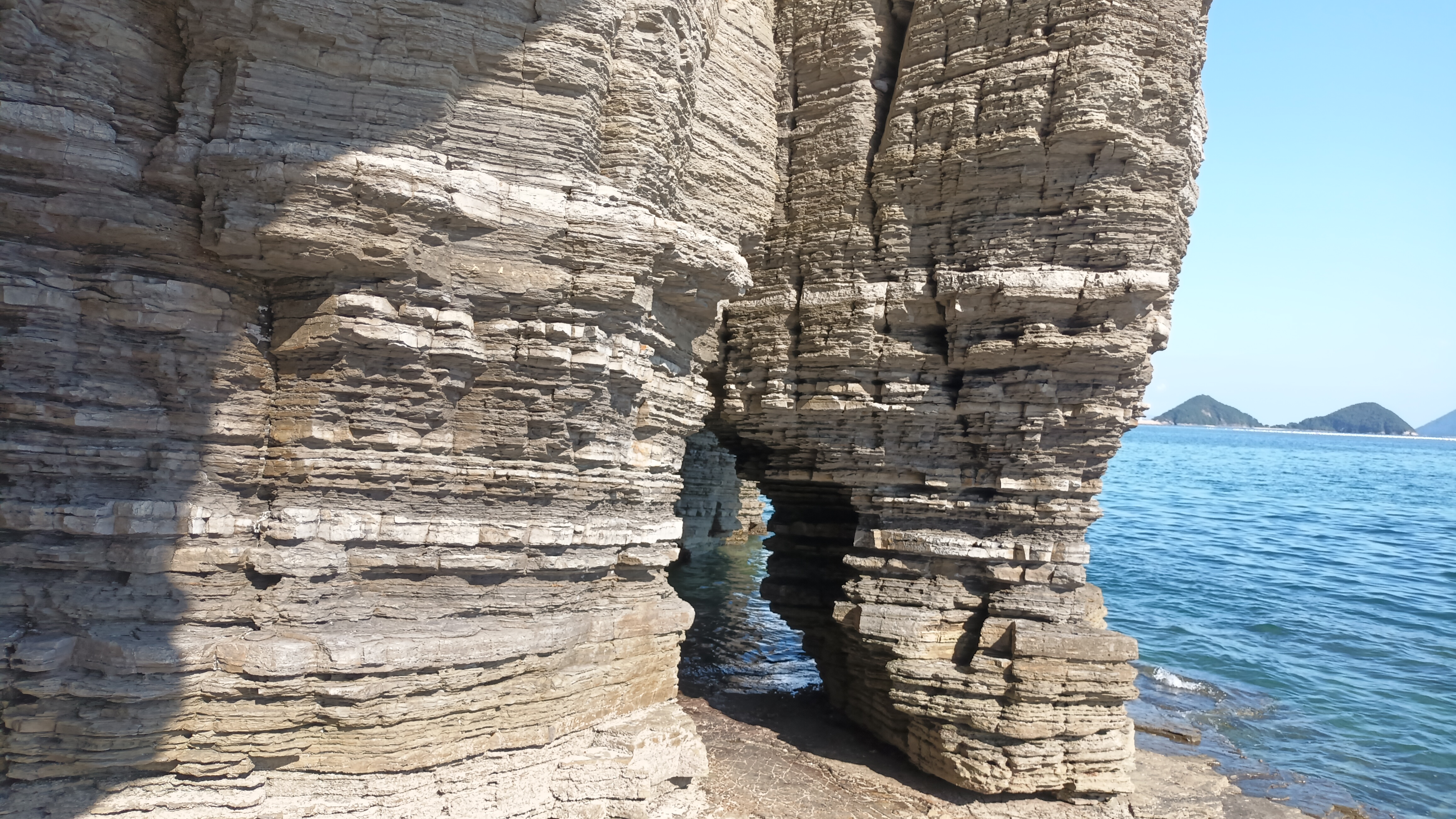
- Type: Geological formation
- Unit of: Hayang Group
- Underlies: Yucheon Group (volcanics)
- Overlies: Haman Formation

Lithology
- Primary: Mudstone, siltstone
- Other: Sandstone, shale

Location
- Coordinates: 35.4°N 128.4°E
- Approximate paleocoordinates: 44.7°N 122.9°E
- Region: Gyeongsangnam-do
- Country: South Korea
- Extent: Gyeongsang Basin
- Jindong Formation (South Korea)

The Jindong Formation (Korean: 진동층; Hanja: 鎭東層; RR: Jindong-cheung) is a geological formation located in South Korea. It is dated to the Cenomanian-Turonian stages of the Late Cretaceous, between 99.9 ± 0.7 Ma and 93.1 ± 0.3 Ma.

== Geological background ==
The Jindong Formation consists of thick, fine-grained, altered volcaniclastic sediments. Most of these sediments are ash-rich mudstone, siltstone, and very fine sandstone. There are also coarser sandstone, conglomerate, carbonates, and tuff.

== Paleontology ==
The Jindong Formation has yielded numerous of dinosaurs and bird tracks. Ichnofossils including unnamed tracks of sauropods and pterosaurs, the isolated sauropod skin impression not associated with trackways, and the poorly preserved juvenile sauropod trackway with no ichnotaxon assignment have been reported.

Ichnofossils of the Jindong Formation
Ichnogenus	Ichnospecies	Region	Member	Material	Notes	Image
Brontopodus	B. isp.				Sauropod tracks	
Caririchnium	C. isp.				Ornithopod tracks	
Goseongornipes	G. markjonesi				Bird tracks	
Gyeongsangornipes	G. lockleyi				Bird tracks	
Hadrosauropodus	H. kyoungsookimi				The first trackway of a quadrupedal ornithopod discovered in Korea, originally attributed to the ichnogenus Caririchnium.	
Jindongornipes	J. kimi				Bird tracks	
Koreanaornis	K. hamanensis				Bird tracks	
Ornithopodichnus	O. masanensis				Currently regarded as dubious ichnotaxon made by ornithopod trackmakers.	
cf. Ruopodosaurus	cf. R. isp.				Ankylosaur trackway, possibly made by (sub)adult Ankylosaurid trackmaker	
Undichna	U. simplicatis; U. bina; U. britannica				Fish swim traces	

== See also ==
- List of fossil sites
