= Hupyeongdong Formation =

Geologic formation in South Korea

Gugyedong Formation
- Stratigraphic range: Albian
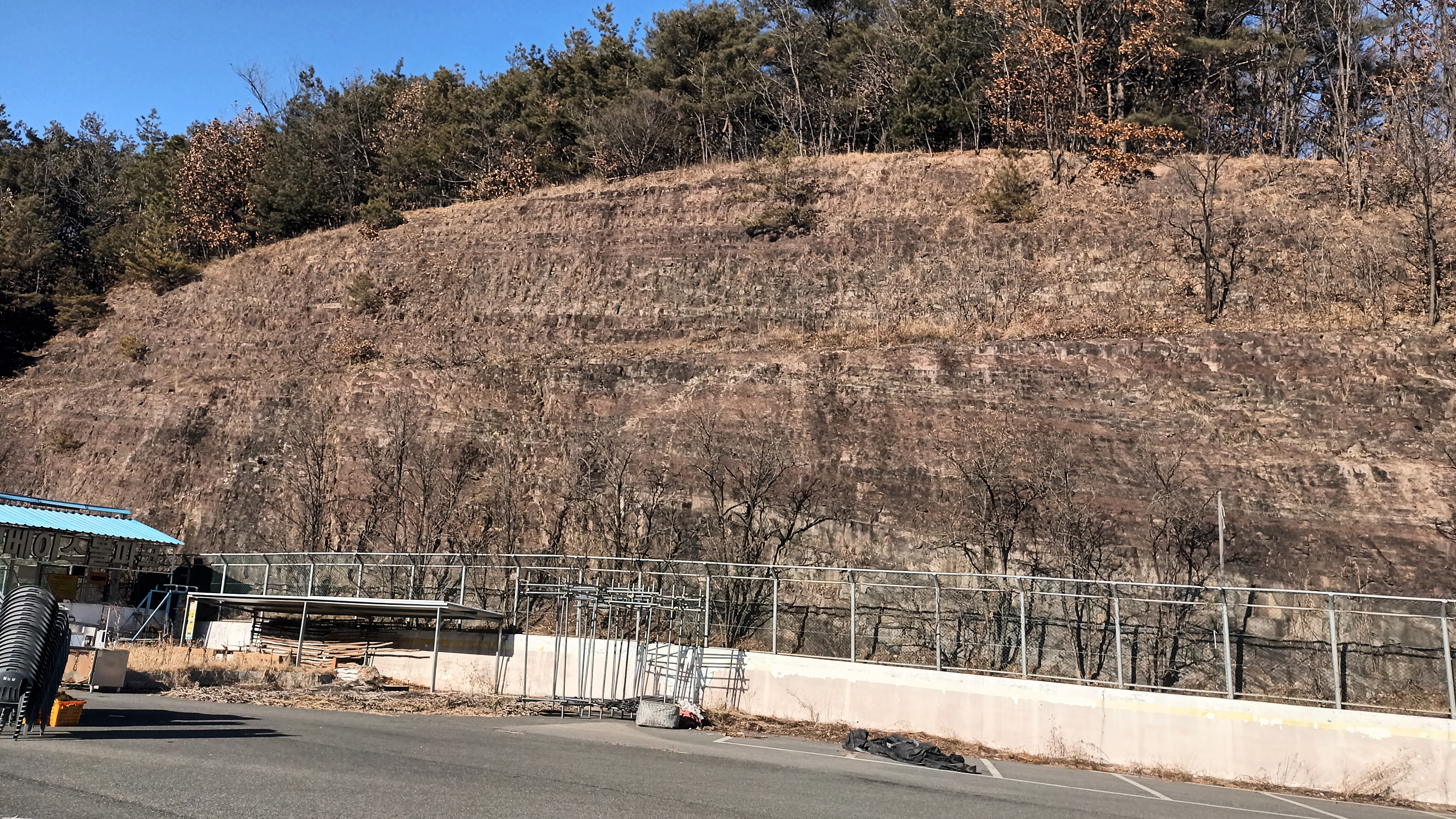
- Type: Geological formation
- Unit of: Hayang Group
- Sub-units: Gumidong Member and Gugyedong Member
- Underlies: Jeomgog Formation
- Overlies: Iljig Formation
- Thickness: ~500 meters

Lithology
- Primary: Sandstone, Siltstone and Shale
- Other: Conglomerate and Tuff

Location
- Coordinates: 36.0°N 128.5°E
- Region: Gyeongsangbuk-do
- Country: South Korea
- Extent: Uiseong Subbasin of the Gyeongsang Basin

Type section
- Named for: Hupyeongdong, Uiseong
- Named by: Kim, Lee and Yang, 1977
- Hupyeongdong Formation (South Korea)

The Hupyeongdong Formation (Korean: 후평동층; Hanja: 後坪洞層; RR: Hupyeongdong-cheung)is a Lower Cretaceous geologic formation in South Korea. It is placed inside of the Uiseong Subbasin of the Gyeongsang Basin. The absolute age of the Gugyedong Formation is not resolved, but overlying and underlying stratigraphic units suggest Albian in age.

== Geology ==
Initially, Chang (1975) named the Gumidong formation and the Gugyedong Formation separately, but Kim et al. (1977) united them into the Hupyeongdong Formation, without dividing members.. In subsequent investigations, multiple sheets suggested the Hupyeongdong Formation could be subdivided into the Gumidong Member in the lower and the Gugyedong Member in the upper part.

The Gumidong Member consists of two or three conglomerate beds and interbedded purple mudstone, whereas the Gugyedong Member is composed of purple mudstone and siltstone. From 60 meters above from the base of the member, lenticular channel conglomerate beds composed mostly of lime nodule peebles are present. Based on sedimentary structures including sross-stratification, cross-lamination and current ripple, paleoenviornment of the Hupyeongdong Formation was suggested to be floodplain setting.

== Fossil content ==
Vertebrates of the Hupyeongdong Formation
Genus	Species	Location	Stratigraphic position	Material	Notes	Images
Sauropoda	indeterminate	Bongam Pass, near Tabri Station	Gugyedong Member	Humerus and 'cadual neural spine'	Includes Ultrasaurus tabriensis(nomen dubium)	
Dromaeosauridae	indeterminate	Bongam Pass, near Tabri Station	Gugyedong Member	A single femur (DGBU-78)	Initially reported as ornithopod	
Testudines	indeterminate	Bongam Pass, near Tabri Station	Gugyedong Member	Carapaces	Undescribed	

Plants of the Hupyeongdong Formation
Genus	Species	Location	Stratigraphic position	Material	Notes	Images
Pseudofrenelopsis	P. parceramosa	Bongam Pass, near Tabri Station	Gugyedong Member			

== See also ==
- List of dinosaur-bearing rock formations
  - List of stratigraphic units with few dinosaur genera
