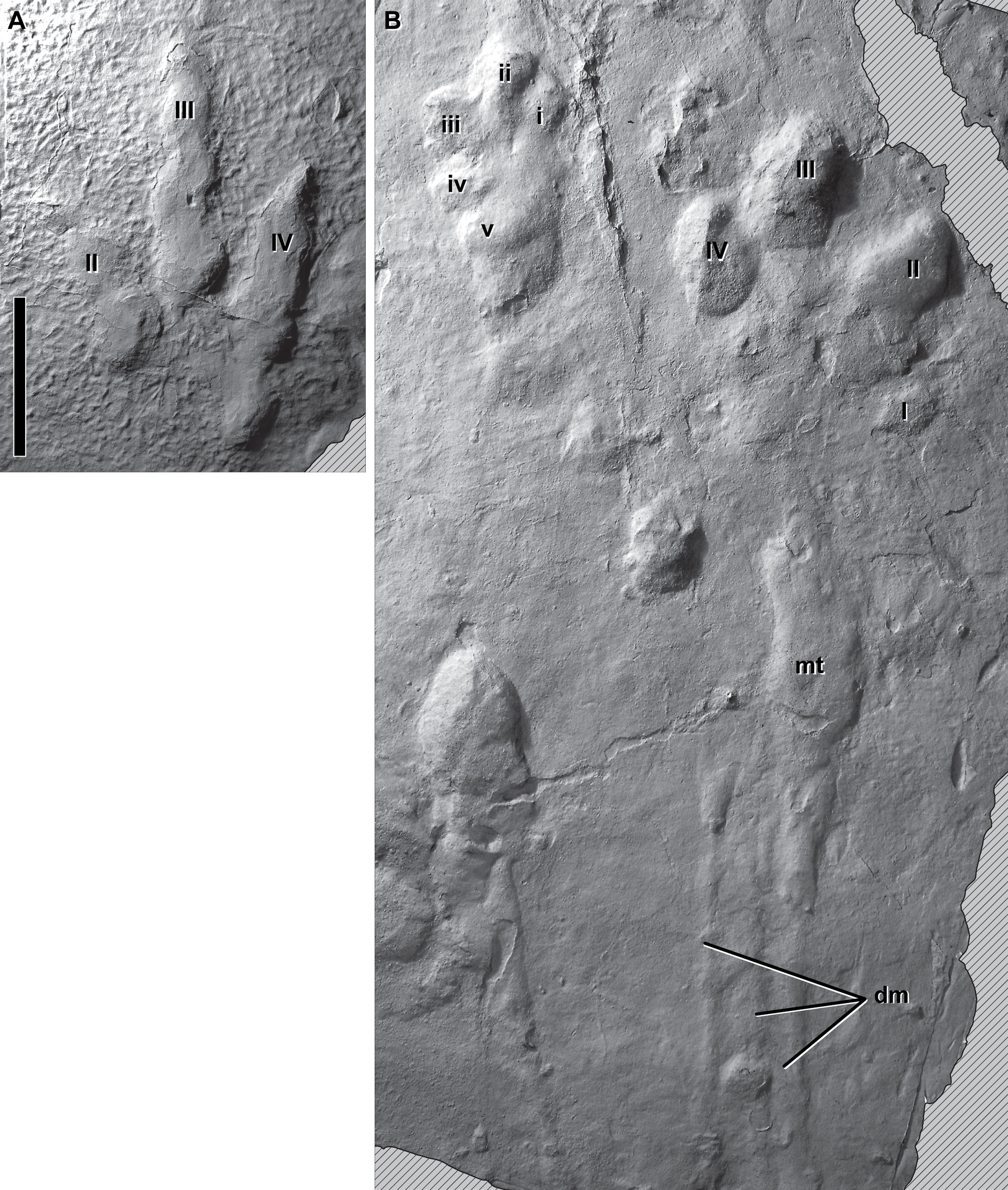
- Positive casts of Grallator (A) and Anomoepus (B) tracks at Moyeni

Trace fossil classification
- Kingdom: Animalia
- Phylum: Chordata
- Class: Reptilia
- Clade: Dinosauria
- Clade: †Ornithischia
- Ichnofamily: †Anomoepodidae
- Ichnogenus: †Anomoepus; Hitchcock, 1848

Type ichnospecies
- †Anomoepus scambus Hitchcock, 1848

Ichnospecies
- 26, see text

Synonyms
- Corvipes Hitchcock, 1858; Gregaripus? Weems, 1987; Hopiichnus? Welles, 1971; Trisauropodiscus? Ellenberger, 1970; Masititrisauropodiscus Ellenberger, 1974; Moyenisauropus Ellenberger, 1974

= Anomoepus =

Anomoepus Temporal range: Early Jurassic

Trace fossil

Anomoepus is the name assigned to several fossil footprints first reported from Early Jurassic beds of the Connecticut River Valley, Massachusetts, US in 1802.

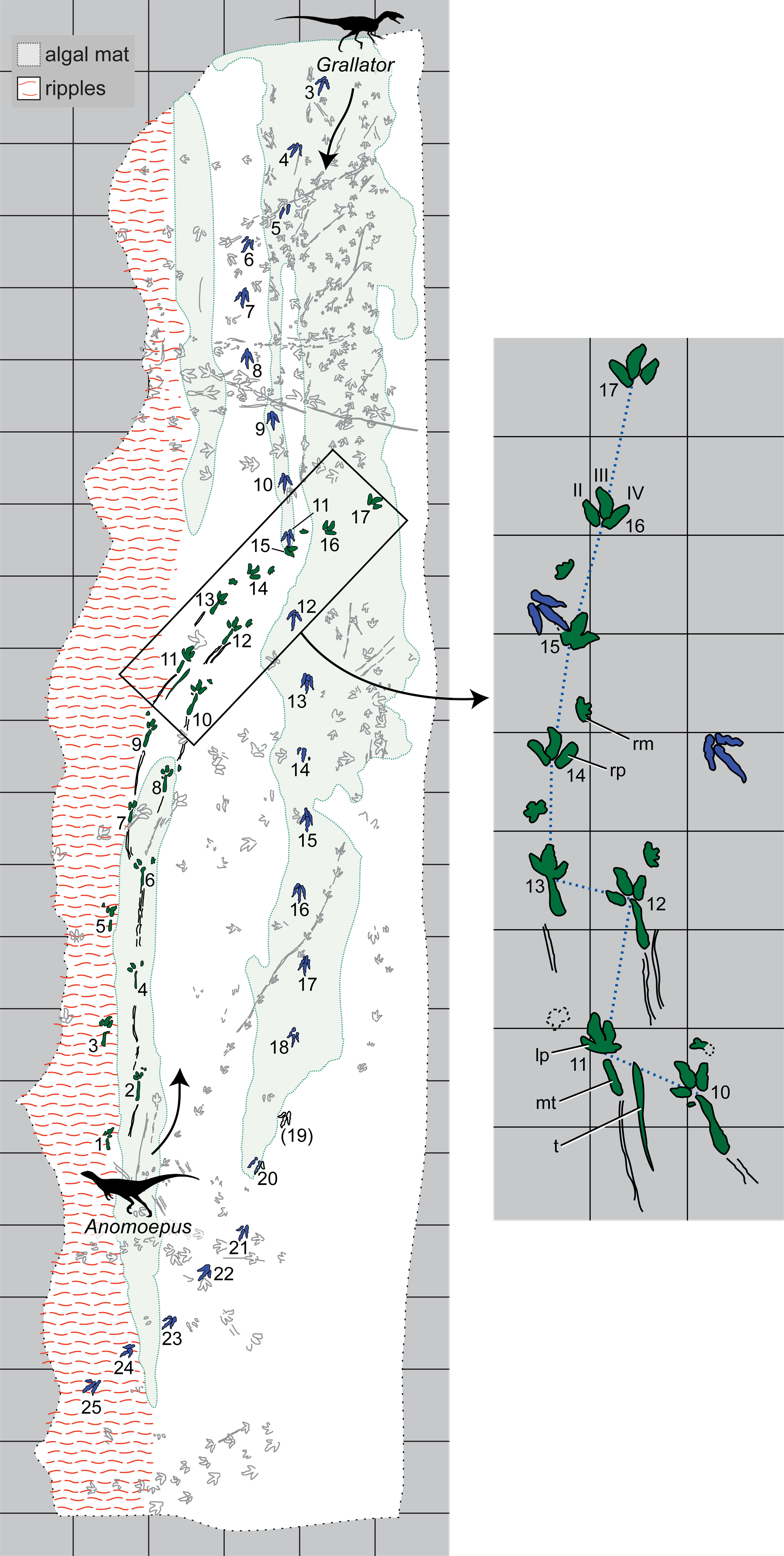
Map showing tracks of Anomoepus (green) and Grallator (blue) in Moyeni

All four feet have left impressions. The smaller forefeet have five toes, whereas the larger hind feet have three toes. There is also an impression which might indicate where the creature rested. The footprints were discovered, amongst others, by a farm boy, Pliny Moody. E.B. Hitchcock, a clergyman, described the Anomoepus footprints and others as evidence of ancient birds. They have since been identified as belonging to a dinosaur, probably an ornithischian, as indicated by the number of toes and the absence of claws on the rear digits. Trackways assigned to Anomoepus from Western Australia, Poland, Slovakia and Czech Republic have also been described. Anomoepus is the name of the footprint, not of the dinosaur, the identity of which remains unknown.

== Ichnospecies ==
- A. scambus Hitchcock, 1848
- A. ranivorus Ellenberger, 1970
- A. vermivorous (Ellenberger, 1970)
- A. minimus (Ellenberger, 1970)
- A. minor (Ellenberger, 1970)
- A. palmipes (Ellenberger, 1970)
- A. natator (Ellenberger, 1970)
- A. aviforma (Ellenberger, 1970)
- A. galliforma (Ellenberger, 1970)
- A. superaviforma (Ellenberger, 1970)
- A. phalassianiforma (Ellenberger, 1970)
- A. levis (Ellenberger, 1970)
- A. popompoi (Ellenberger, 1970)
- A. supervipes (Ellenberger, 1970)
- A. fringilla (Ellenberger, 1974)
- A. turda (Ellenberger, 1974)
- A. minutus (Ellenberger, 1974)
- A. perdiciforma (Ellenberger, 1974)
- A. natatilis (Ellenberger, 1974)
- A. levicauda (Ellenberger, 1974)
- A. dodai (Ellenberger, 1974)
- A. longicauda (Ellenberger, 1974)
- A. moghrebensis Biron & Dutuit, 1981
- A. pienkovskii Gierliński, 1991
- A. karaszevskii (Gierliński, 1991)
- A. moabensis (M.G. Lockley, S.Y. Yang, M. Matsukawa, F. Fleming, & Lim, 1992)

== See also ==
- List of dinosaur ichnogenera
- Ichnology
- Connecticut River Valley trackways
