= Geoncheonri Formation =

Early Cretaceous geologic formation in South Korea

- Stratigraphic range: ~Turonian–Santonian
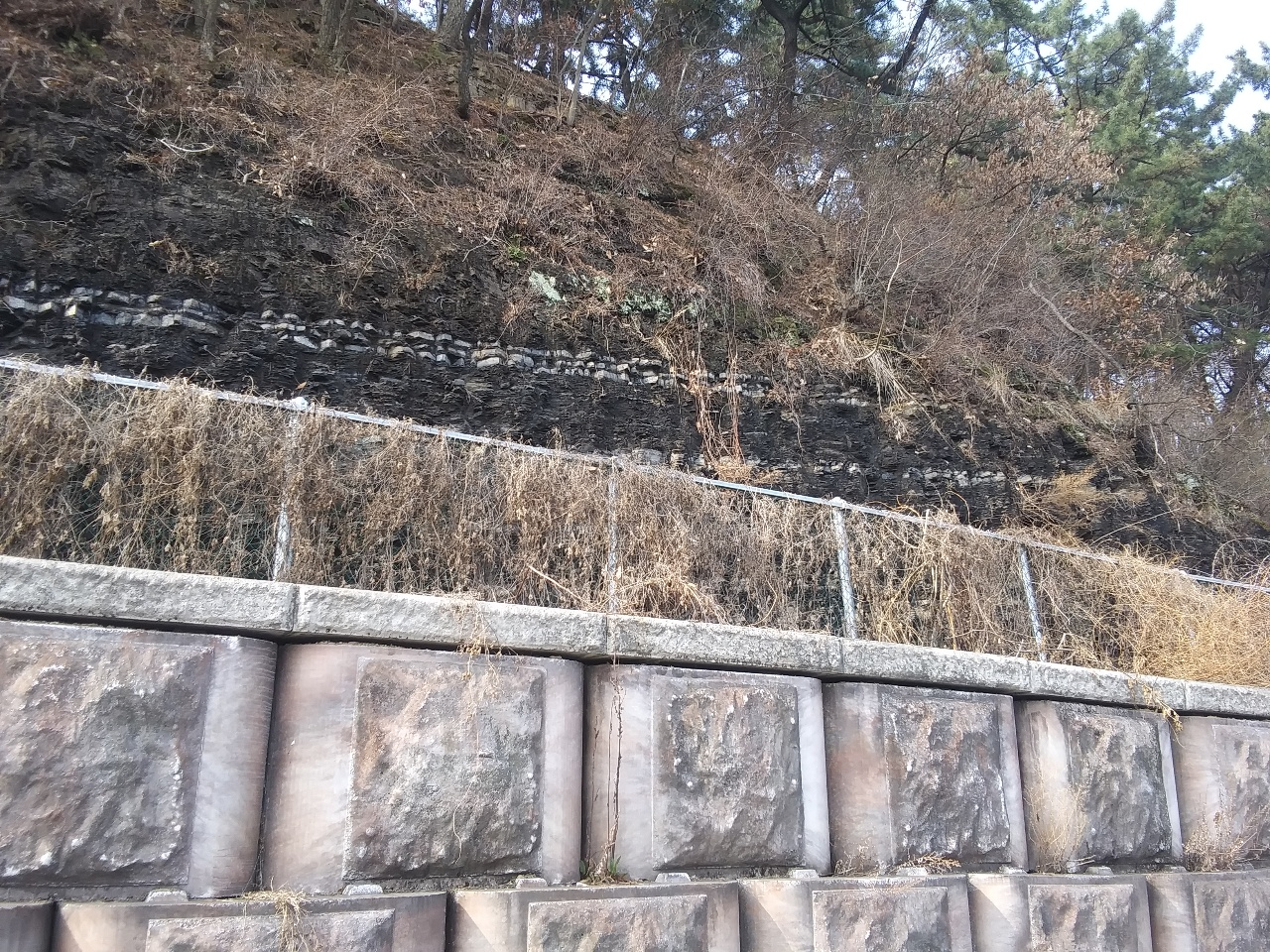
- Type: Geological formation
- Unit of: Hayang Group
- Underlies: Yucheon Group; Jusasan Formation (volcanics)
- Overlies: Chaeyaksan Formation (volcanics)
- Thickness: Up to 2,000m

Lithology
- Primary: Mudstone
- Other: Siltstone

Location
- Coordinates: 35.9°N 128.6°E
- Approximate paleocoordinates: 45.2°N 122.7°E
- Region: Daegu, Gyeongsangbuk-do, Gyeongsangnam-do
- Country: South Korea
- Extent: Gyeongsang Basin
- Geoncheonri Formation (South Korea)

The Geoncheonri Formation (Korean: 건천리층; Hanja: 乾川里層; RR: Geoncheolli-cheung) is an Upper Cretaceous (Turonian-Santonian) geologic formation of the Hayang Group in the Gyeongsang Basin of southeast South Korea. Fossil ornithopod tracks, as well as fossils of Kirgizemys have been reported from the lacustrine siltstones and mudstones of the formation.

== Geology ==
The Geoncheonri Formation (ca. 800 metres (2,600 ft) thick) is the uppermost formation of the Hayang Group in the Uiseong Subbasin, belonging to the Gyeongsang Supergroup. It correlates with the upper part of the Jindong Formation of the Milyang Subbasin. The depositional environment of the Geonchonri Formation has been interpreted as shallow lacustrine settings, consists of mudstones, siltstones and fine-to medium grained sandstones.

The age of the Geonchonri Formation has been disputed for decades. Plant fossils from the Geoncheonri Formation were correlated with the Monobegawa Group and the Gyliak Series (Lower to "Middle" Cretaceous) in Japan. Yang (1978) noted that the co-occurrence of a bivalve Trigonioides paucisulcatus in the Geonchonri Formation and in the Goshonoura Group (Cenomanian to Turonian) of Japan. However, primitive angiosperm pollen (Retimonocolpites peroreticulatus and Tricolpites sp.) and other palynological features suggest that the age of the Geoncheonri Formation is Aptian to Albian. The charophytes from the Geoncheonri Formation suggested an Aptian to Albian in age. Whereas the underlying Chaeyaksan Basalt dates back to 94 ± 3 Ma, and the Rb-Sr age dating suggests that the age of the overlying Jusasan Andesite is 83.6 Ma. Moreover, based on ostracod fossils, Choi and Wang (2024) suggested the depositional age of the Geonchonri Formation dates back to Late Cretaceous, especially Turonian to Santonian, probably up to Campanian.

== Fossil content ==
The following fossils were reported from the formation:

- Turtles
  - Kirgizemys cf. exaratus
- Ostracods
  - Cypridea sp.
  - Lycopterocypris cf. profunda
  - Cypria cf. elata
- Ichnofossils
  - Ornithopoda indet.
  - Theropoda indet.

== See also ==
- List of dinosaur-bearing rock formations
  - List of stratigraphic units with ornithischian tracks
    - Ornithopod tracks
- Jindong Formation
