= Geology of North York Moors National Park =

The geology of the North York Moors National Park in northern England is provided largely by a thick southerly dipping sequence of sedimentary rocks deposited in the Cleveland Basin during the Jurassic Period. A series of ice ages during the Quaternary period has left a variety of glacial deposits, particularly around the margins of the National Park.

== Jurassic ==
The Early Jurassic Epoch (201-174 million years ago) is represented by the rocks of the Lias whilst the Middle Jurassic is represented by the Ravenscar and Great Oolite groups together with the lower part of the Ancholme Group. The remainder of the Ancholme Group together with the rocks of the Corallian are of Late Jurassic age. It is the Corrallian formations which form the summits and southerly tilted slopes of the Tabular Hills along the southern margin of the National Park. as well as the Hambleton Hills to their west.

=== Lias Group ===
The oldest bedrock within the National Park is the Redcar Mudstone Formation, a sequence of mudstones and siltstones dating from around 190 million years ago. This is the lowermost/earliest of four formations which are found in the area that are ascribed to the Lias Group. It forms the lower ground around the northwestern margins of the area, though is typically obscured by superficial deposits. It is also encountered as isolated inliers within several of the valleys. It outcrops too along the coast southwards as far as Staithes and around Robin Hood's Bay from Homerell Hole south to Old Peak/South Cheek.

The overlying Staithes Sandstone Formation comprises a thickness of up to 30m of silty and bioturbated sandstone of Pliensbachian age. Also of Pliensbachian age is the Cleveland Ironstone Formation, a mix of siltstones and sandstones but including siderite nodules. Both formations are found in the same areas as the Redcar Mudstones.

The Whitby Mudstone Formation reaches thicknesses of 120m and is the youngest member of the Lias Group in the area. These fossiliferous mudstones and siltstones also contain some sandstones. Nodules of phosphate and limestone occur in places.

=== Ravenscar Group ===
Rocks of the Ravenscar Group range from Aalenian through Bajocian to Bathonian in age, i.e. around 174-166 million years old. The group comprises the following formations and members (uppermost/youngest first):

- Scalby Formation
  - Long Nab Member
  - Moor Grit Member
- Scarborough Formation
- Eller Beck Formation
- Saltwick and Cloughton formations
- Dogger Formation

=== Great Oolite Group ===
Rocks of the Great Oolite Group range locally from Bathonian to Callovian in age, i.e. around 168-164 million years old. It includes the:

- Cornbrash Formation

=== Ancholme Group ===
Rocks of the Ancholme Group range from the Callovian through Oxfordian to the Kimmeridgian, i.e. around 166-152 million years old. It comprises:

- Oxford Clay Formation
- Osgodby Formation

=== Corallian Group ===
Rocks of the Corallian Group are all of Oxfordian age, i.e. around 163-157 million years old. The group comprises the:

- Upper Calcareous Grit Formation
- Coralline Oolite Formation
  - Malton Oolite & Coral Rag members
  - Middle Calcareous Grit Member
  - Hambleton Oolite Member
- Lower Calcareous Grit Formation

== Palaeogene intrusion ==
The Armathwaite-Cleveland Dyke was intruded into the country rocks during the Palaeocene epoch as part of the substantial dyke swarm associated with the Mull Volcanic Complex. It runs WNW-ESE across the area, its south-easternmost expression on Fylingdales Moor being 430 kilometres (270 mi) from the Mull volcano. This porphyritic basaltic andesite is between 22 metres (72 ft) and 28 metres (92 ft) wide and has been quarried in places.

== Geological structure ==
The originally flat-lying strata of the area was tilted gently southwards. The Cleveland Anticline, of Jurassic and Cretaceous age, trends east-west whilst superimposed on this first-order fold are smaller scale folds, notably in the east and including the Whitby, Goathland and Fylingdales synclines and the Eskdale and Lockton anticlines. Broad domed structures include Chop Gate Dome, Danby Head Dome and Robin Hood’s Bay Dome with strata dipping away on all sides.

Largely to the south of the national park numerous east-west trending normal faults can be traced across country, a zone known as the Howardian Hills Fault Belt. some of these continue into the southernmost reaches of the park, for example the Vale of Pickering Fault which runs through Thornton-le-Dale and the Weaverthorpe Fault north of Helmsley. In the southwest, two parallel faults downthrow the geological succession between them, the more northerly un-named one running through Ampleforth effectively defining the margin of the national park. The southerly one is known as the Coxwold-Gilling-Linton Fault and defines the northern end of the Howardian Hills which are geologically similar to the Hambleton Hills to their north.

== Quaternary ==
=== Glacial ===
North Sea Ice penetrated inland to leave deposits of till along the coastal margin. Newton Dale, the course of the Sea Cut and the Forge Valley are all landscape legacies of this period. Gormire Lake beneath Whitestone Cliff is of glacial origin.

=== Mass movement ===
The western scarp of the Hambleton Hills from Byland Abbey in the south to Broughton Bank in the north is host to landslips. Those at Kirby Bank beneath Cringle Moor, at Boltby Scar and at Whitestone Cliff are especially prominent.

== Economic geology ==
Potash has been mined at Boulby Mine since 1973 and in 2015 approval was given for the development of a mine near Whitby, the Woodsmith Mine, for the extraction of potash and polyhalite.

Between the 17th and the 19th centuries alum was worked at several sites, mainly near the coast. These included the Peak Alum Works near Ravenscar, now owned by the National Trust, Kettleness near Runswick Bay, along with other quarries at Sandsend Ness and at Bay Ness, Robin Hood's Bay. The alum shales occur in a band c. 35m thick within The Whitby Mudstone Formation.

There is evidence that local iron working took place in the area as early as Roman times. Traces of early workings have been found at various places in the National Park including Levisham, Danby, Glaisdale, Fryup Dale and near Goathland. From the mid 19th to the early 20th century Ironstone mining in Rosedale led to a large increase in the local population and significant development in the valley.

Thin coal seams occur in the Jurassic, particularly in the Ravenscar Group. These seams have been worked at a number of places including Danby, Eskdale and Coxwold and Rudland Rigg, above Bransdale. Most of the old coal pits are west of the A169 from Whitby to Pickering and occupy an east-west belt which runs north of the Esk valley and extends c. 20km south. Much of the coal was for use in connection with local lime burning but in the early years of the Rosedale iron mining boom the ore extracted was roasted in the valley using coal mined at Rosedale Head.

Jet has been mined from shales in the upper part of the Lias Group. The industry reached a peak in the middle of the 19th century and mine sites are scattered along the coast and along the northern escarpment between Guisborough and Osmotherley, 38 miners worked at Swainby at its peak.

== Conservation and recreation ==
The Cleveland Way follows the coastline of the National Park where its geology is most prominently displayed.

== See also ==
- Ironstone mining in Cleveland and North Yorkshire
- Alum industry in North Yorkshire
