= San Giovanni Rotondo Formation =

Geologic formation in Italy

- Stratigraphic range: Hauterivian-Barremian; ~136–126 Ma
- Type: Geological formation

Lithology
- Primary: Limestone
- Other: Claystone

Location
- Coordinates: 41.7°N 15.7°E
- Approximate paleocoordinates: 26.1°N 19.7°E
- Region: Apulia
- Country: Italy
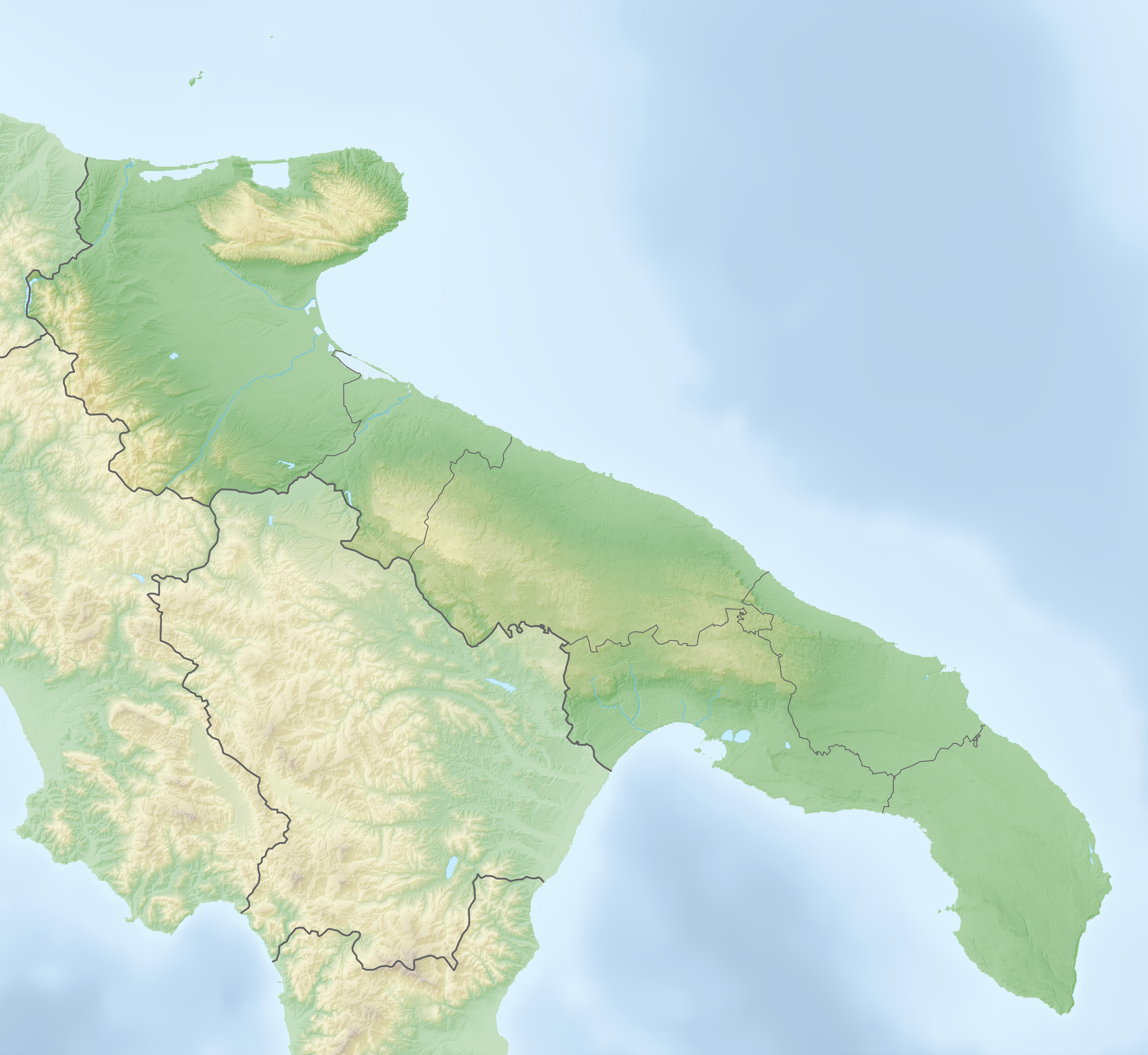
- San Giovanni Rotondo Formation (Italy) San Giovanni Rotondo Formation (Apulia)

The San Giovanni Rotondo Formation is an Early Cretaceous (Hauterivian to Barremian) geologic formation in Italy. Fossil ornithopod tracks have been reported from the formation.

== Fossil content ==
The following fossils have been reported from the formation:

Ichnofossils

- Ornithischia indet.
- Theropoda indet.

== See also ==
- List of dinosaur-bearing rock formations
  - List of stratigraphic units with ornithischian tracks
    - Ornithopod tracks
- List of fossiliferous stratigraphic units in Italy
  - Calcare di Altamura
  - Calcare di Bari
