= List of stratigraphic units with ornithischian tracks =

== Indeterminate or unspecified ornithischian tracks ==
| Name | Age | Location | Description |
|---|---|---|---|
| Abu Agag Formation | | Egypt; Sudan | Description |
| Ansbachersandstein | | Germany | Description |
| Argana Formation | Middle Carnian | Morocco | Description |
| Bajo Barreal Formation | Cenomanian to Coniacian | Argentina | Description |
| Ball's Bluff Formation | | USA | Description |
| Boonton Formation | | USA | Description |
| Calcari Grigi di Noriglio Formation | | Italy | Description |
| Cow Branch Formation | | USA | Description |
| East Berlin Formation | | USA | Description |
| Feltville Formation | | USA | Description |
| Izuki Formation | | Japan | Description |
| Kayenta Formation | Sinemurian to Pliensbachian | USA | Description |
| Kitadani Formation | Aptian to Albian | Japan | Description |
| McCoy Brook Formation | | Canada | Description |
| Mecsek Coal Formation | | Hungary | Description |
| Mist Mountain Formation | | Canada | Description |
| Montemarcello Formation | | Italy | Description |
| Navajo Sandstone | Pliensbachian to Toarcian | USA | Description |
| Pajarito Formation | | USA | Description |
| Penglaizhen Formation | | China | Description |
| Portland Formation | Pliensbachian to Toarcian | USA | Description |
| Shuttle Meadow Formation | | USA | Description |
| Tomanová Formation | ?Late Norian – Rhaetian | Poland, Slovakia | Description |
| Towaco Formation | | USA | Description |
| Wealden Group | | UK | Description |
| Zagaje Formation | | Poland | Description |

== Ceratopsians ==
| Name | Age | Location | Description |
|---|---|---|---|
| Horseshoe Canyon Formation | Early Maastrichtian | Canada | Description |
| Laramie Formation | Late Maastrichtian | USA | Description |
| Mesaverde Formation | | USA | Description |
| Scollard Formation | Late Maastrichtian | Canada | Description |

== Ornithopods ==
| Name | Age | Location | Description |
|---|---|---|---|
| Akaiwa Formation | | Japan | Description |
| Alacón Formation | | Spain | Description |
| Antenor Navarro Formation | | Brazil | Description |
| Arapahoe Formation | | USA | Description |
| Aréen Formation | | Spain | Description |
| Argiles de l'Irhazer | | Niger | Description |
| Banos del Flaco Formation | | Chile | Description |
| Blackhawk Formation | | USA | Description |
| Broome Sandstone | | Australia | Description |
| Bruckeburg Formation | | Germany | |
| Cadomin Formation | | Canada | Description |
| Cal Orcko | Maastrichtian | Bolivia | |
| Castellar Formation | | Spain | Description |
| Morrison Formation | Time | USA | Description |
| Calcare di Altamura Formation | | Italy | Description |
| Calcari Grigi di Noriglio Formation | | Italy | Description |
| Cedar Mountain Formation | Barremian to basal Cenomanian | USA | Description |
| Cerroa del Pueblo Formation | | Mexico | Description |
| Chacarilla Formation | | Chile | Description |
| Chandler Formation | | Canada | Description |
| Chiating Series | | China | Description |
| Corda Formation | | Brazil | Description |
| Dakota Formation | | USA | Description |
| Dinosaur Park Formation | Late Campanian | Canada | Description |
| Dolomia Principale Formation | | Italy; Switzerland | Description |
| Dunvegan Formation | | Canada | Description |
| Encisco Group | Early Cretaceous | Spain | Description |
| Festningen Sandstone | | Svalbard | Description |
| Gates Formation | | Canada | Description |
| Geoncheonri Formation | | South Korea | Description |
| Gething Formation | | Canada | Description |
| Glen Rose Formation | Late Aptian to Early Albian | USA | Description |
| Griman Creek Formation | | Australia | Description |
| Haman Formation | | South Korea | Description |
| Hasandong Formation | | South Korea | Description |
| Hastings Beds | Late Berriasian to Valanginian | UK | Description |
| Hensel Formation | | USA | Description |
| Horseshoe Canyon Formation | Early Maastrichtian | Canada | Description |
| Imi-n-Ifri Formation | | Morocco | Description |
| Izuki Formation | | Japan | Description |
| Jiaguan Formation | | China | Description |
| Jindong Formation | | South Korea | Description |
| Jinju Formation | | South Korea | Description |
| Kagidani Formation | | South Korea | Description |
| Katrol Formation | | India | Description |
| Kem-Kem Beds | | Morocco | Description |
| Kitadani Formation | Aptian to Albian | Japan | Description |
| Kiyosou-e Formation | | Japan | Description |
| Lakota Formation | Barremian | USA | Description |
| Laramie Formation | Late Maastrichtian | USA | Description |
| Lastres Formation | | Spain | Description |
| Lealt Shale Formation | | Scotland | Description |
| Mesaverde Formation | | USA | Description |
| Mexcala Formation | | Mexico | Description |
| Milk River Formation | Early Campanian | Canada | Description |
| Montemarcello Formation | | [[|]] | Description |
| Morrison Formation | Time | USA | Description |
| Nagatogawa Formation | | [[|]] | Description |
| Nanchao Formation | | China | Description |
| Oncala Group | | Spain | Description |
| Pajarito Formation | | USA | Description |
| Patuxent Formation | | USA | Description |
| Phra Wihan Formation | | Thailand | Description |
| Piranhas Formation | | Brazil | Description |
| Plainview Formation | | USA | Description |
| Precipice Sandstone | | Australia | Description |
| Purbeck Beds | Berriasian | UK | Description |
| Razorback Beds | | Australia | Description |
| Rio Limay Formation | | Argentina | Description |
| Rupelo Formation | | Spain | Description |
| Sagog Formation | | South Korea | Description |
| Saltwick Formation | | UK | Description |
| San Giovanni Rotondo Formation | | Italy | Description |
| Santa Lucia Formation | | [[|]] | Description |
| Schrattenkalk Formation | | Germany | Description |
| Sebayashi Formation | | Japan | Description |
| Soncco Formation | | [[|]] | Description |
| Sousa Formation | | Brazil | Description |
| South Platte Formation | | [[|]] | Description |
| Tantalus Formation | | Canada | Description |
| Tecocoyunca Group | | Mexico | Description |
| Terenes Formation | | Portugal | Description |
| Tochikubo Formation | | Japan | Description |
| Tongfosi Formation | | China | Description |
| Tremp Formation | | Spain | Description |
| Uhangri Formation | | South Korea | Description |
| Villar del Arzobispo Formation | | Spain | Description |
| Vilquechico Formation | | Peru | Description |
| Wagad Formation | | India | Description |
| Walloon Group | | Australia | Description |
| Wealden Group | | UK | Description |
| Winton Formation | Cenomanian | Australia | |
| Woodbine Formation | | USA | Description |
| Xiguayuan Formation | | China | Description |
| Zagaje Formation | | Poland | Description |
| Zarbiz Svita | | [[|]] | Description |
| Zorillo Formation | | [[|]] | Description |

== Thyreophorans ==
| Name | Age | Location | Description |
|---|---|---|---|
| Calcari Grigi di Noriglio Formation | | Italy | Description |

=== Ankylosaurs ===
| Name | Age | Location | Description |
|---|---|---|---|
| Blackhawk Formation | | USA | Description |
| Cal Orcko | Maastrichtian | Bolivia | |
| Calcare di Altamura Formation | | Italy | Description |
| Cedar Mountain Formation | Barremian to basal Cenomanian | USA | Description |
| Chandler Formation | | USA | Description |
| Djadochta Formation | Middle Campanian | China; Mongolia | has many alternate spellings |
| Dunvegan Formation | | Canada | Description |
| Gates Formation | | Canada | Description |
| Gething Formation | | Canada | Description |
| Plainview Formation | | USA | Description |
| Purbeck Beds | Berriasian | UK | Description |
| Shirabad Svita | | Tajikistan | Description |
| South Platte Formation | | USA | Description |
| Tantalus Formation | | Canada | Description |
| Wealden Group | | UK | Description |

=== Stegosaurs ===
| Name | Age | Location | Description |
|---|---|---|---|
| Aganane Formation | | Morocco | Description |
| Broome Sandstone | | Australia | Description |
| Chacarilla Formation | | Chile | Description |
| Lastres Formation | | Spain | Description |
| Morrison Formation | Time | USA | Description |
| Patuxent Formation | | USA | Description |
| Saltwick Formation | | UK | Description |
| Walloon Group | | Australia | Description |
| Lameta Formation | | India | Description |

== See also ==
List of dinosaur-bearing rock formations
