= Saltwick Formation =

- Stratigraphic range: Aalenian
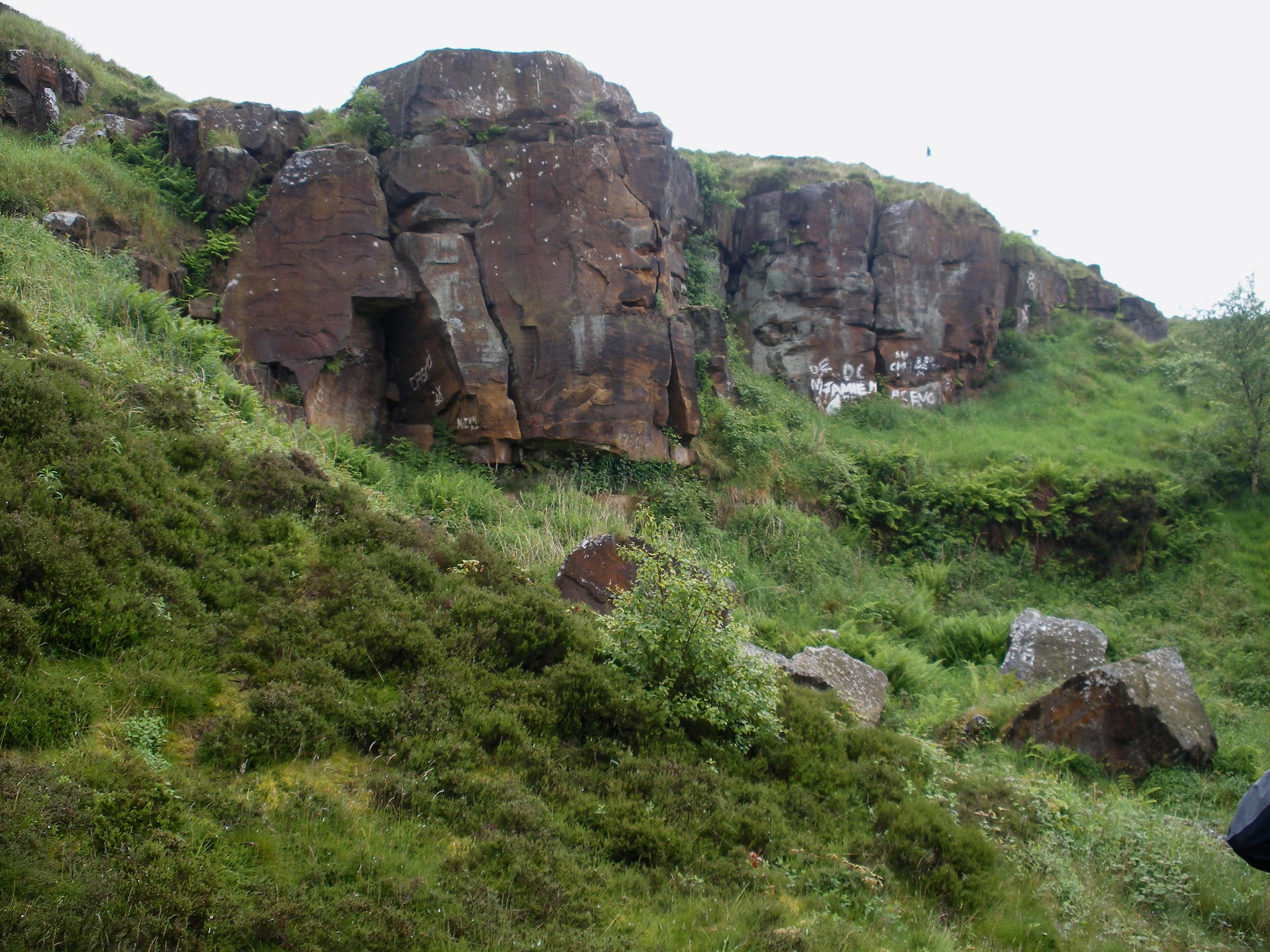
- Exposure of the Saltwick Formation at Eston Nab Quarry
- Type: Geological formation
- Unit of: Ravenscar Group
- Underlies: Eller Beck Formation
- Overlies: Dogger Formation
- Thickness: up to 50 m, thinning to 5-10 m

Lithology
- Primary: Mudstone, Siltstone, Sandstone
- Other: Ironstone

Location
- Region: Europe
- Country: United Kingdom
- Extent: Cleveland Basin, Yorkshire

Type section
- Named for: Saltwick Bay

The Saltwick Formation is a Middle Jurassic geologic formation in Yorkshire and the western North Sea. It is primarily Aalenian in age. Fossil footprints, assigned to the tetrapod ichnogenus Characichnos, as well as stegosaur tracks have been reported from the formation. An indeterminate sauropod, nicknamed Alan, has also been reported from the formation.

== See also ==
- List of dinosaur-bearing rock formations
  - List of stratigraphic units with ornithischian tracks
    - Stegosaur tracks
