= Zarbuz Formation =

Geologic formation

- Stratigraphic range: Callovian-Oxfordian; ~166–158 Ma
- Type: Geological formation

Location
- Coordinates: 38.9°N 70.0°E
- Approximate paleocoordinates: 37.8°N 75.2°E
- Country: Tajikistan
- Zarbuz Formation (Tajikistan)

The Zarbuz Formation (Russian: Zarbuz Svita), also named Zarbiz Svita, is a Jurassic (Callovian to Oxfordian) geologic formation in Tajikistan. Fossil ornithopod tracks have been reported from the formation.

== Fossil content ==
The following fossils have been reported from the formation:

- Ichnofossils
  - Dinosauria indet.

== See also ==
- List of dinosaur-bearing rock formations
  - List of stratigraphic units with ornithischian tracks
    - Ornithopod tracks
