= Osgodby Formation =

- Stratigraphic range: Callovian
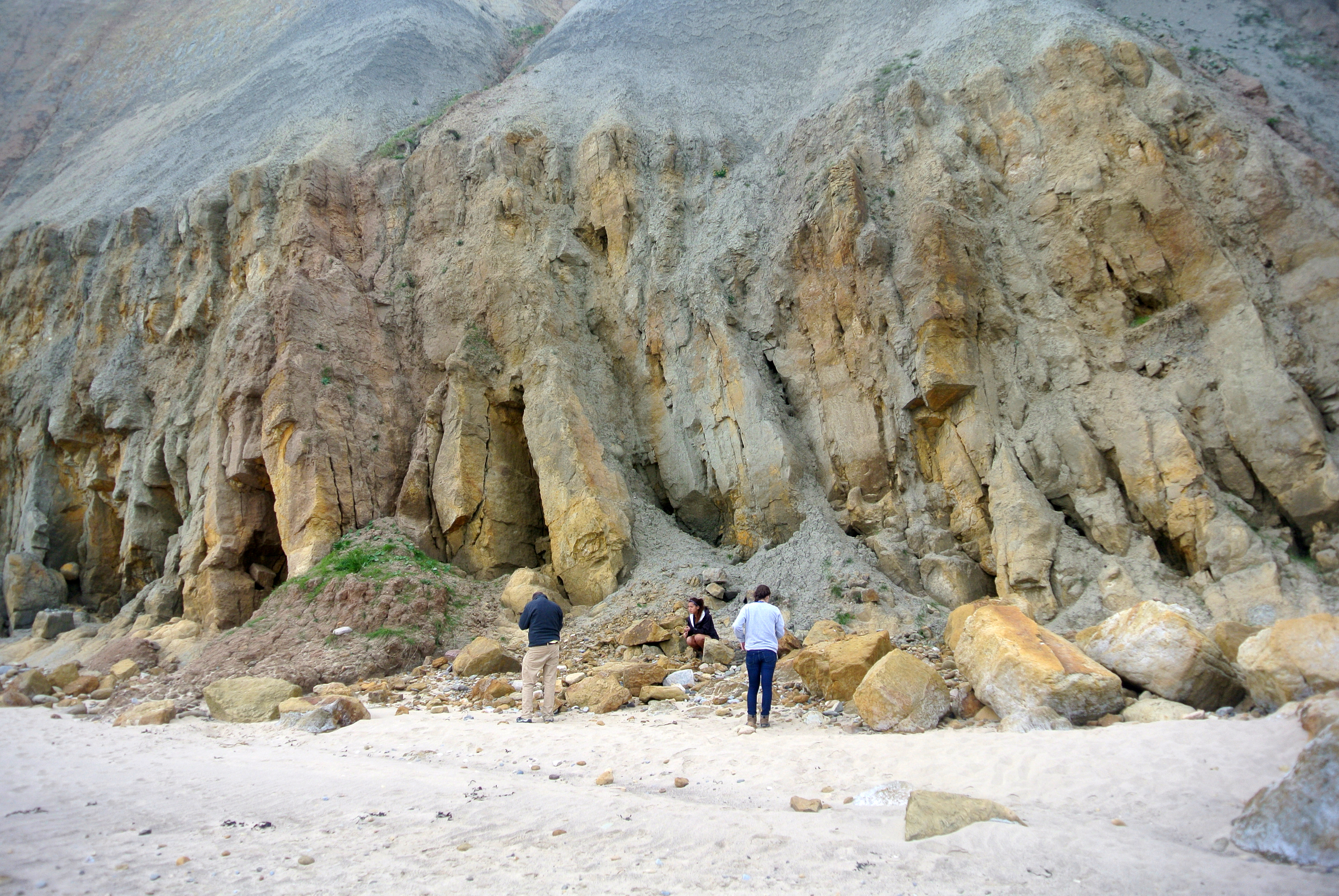
- Osgodby Formation exposed on the shore of Cayton Bay, North Yorkshire.
- Type: Formation
- Sub-units: Redcliff Rock Member, Langdale Member, Hackness Rock Member
- Underlies: Oxford Clay Formation
- Overlies: Cayton Clay Formation (Where the Cornbrash Formation is present), Scalby Formation
- Thickness: Up to 28.5 m on the North Yorkshire Coast, thins to c. 20 m in the Hambleton Hills

Lithology
- Primary: Sandstone
- Other: Siltstone, Limestone

Location
- Region: England
- Country: United Kingdom
- Extent: Cleveland Basin

Type section
- Named for: Osgodby-by-the-Sea

The Osgodby Formation is a geologic formation in England. It comprises rocks and fossils dating from the Callovian age of the Jurassic period.

== See also ==
- List of fossiliferous stratigraphic units in England
