= Chiating Series =

Geologic formation in China

- Type: Geological formation

The Chiating Series is a Mesozoic geologic formation in China. Fossil ornithopod tracks have been reported from the formation.

== See also ==
- Geologic formations
- Mesozoic geologic formations
- List of dinosaur-bearing rock formations
  - List of stratigraphic units with ornithischian tracks
    - Ornithopod tracks
