= Schrattenkalk Formation =

Geologic formation in the Alps

- Stratigraphic range: Barremian-Aptian
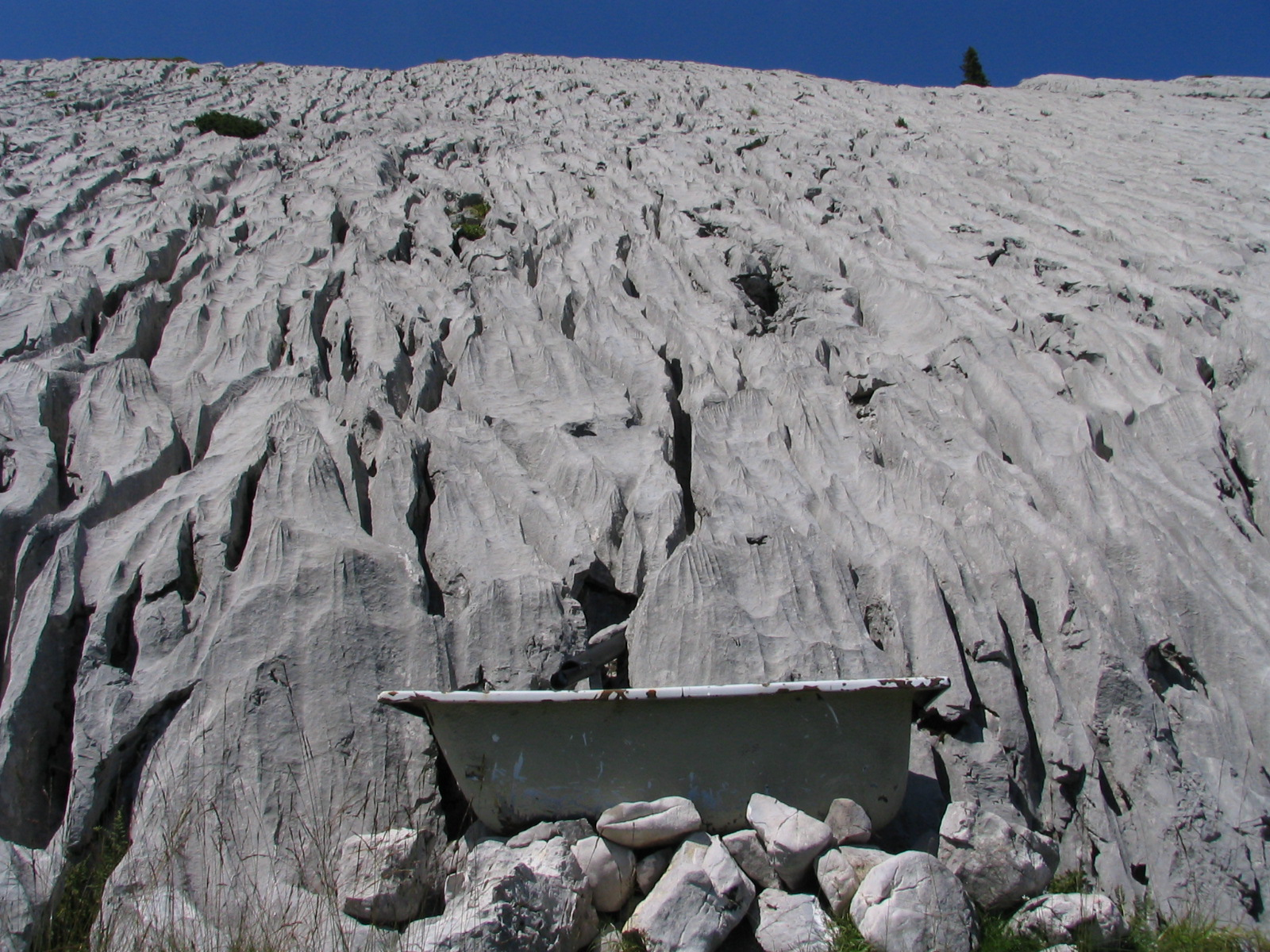
- Schrattenkalk in Luzern, Switzerland
- Type: Geological formation
- Sub-units: Lower Schrattenkalk, Rawil Member, Upper Schrattenkalk
- Underlies: Garschella Formation
- Overlies: Tierwis Formation
- Thickness: up to 300 m (980 ft)

Lithology
- Primary: Limestone
- Other: Sandstone, mudstone

Location
- Coordinates: 46.9751°N 8.3303°E
- Approximate paleocoordinates: 31.6°N 18.5°E
- Region: Alps
- Country: Austria, Germany, Switzerland

Type section
- Named for: Schrattenfluh
- Named by: Bernhard Studer
- Year defined: 1834
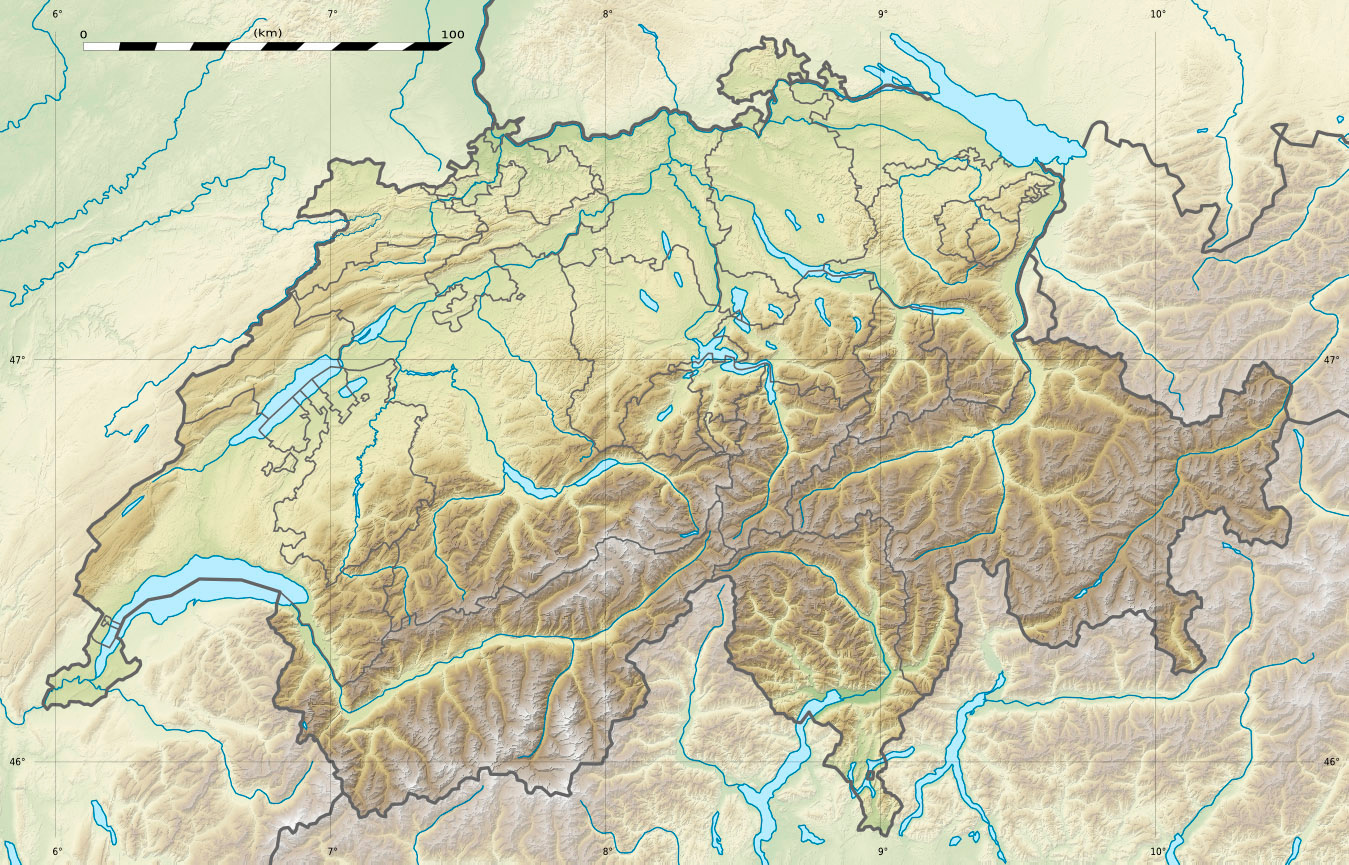
- Schrattenkalk Formation (Switzerland)

The Schrattenkalk Formation is a Barremian to Aptian geologic formation in the Alps. The limestone is highly karstified. Fossil ornithopod tracks have been reported from the formation. Iguanodont tracks have been registered in the Swiss portion of the formation. The famous north face of the Eiger is partly composed of Schrattenkalk, as well as the Sturmannshöhle in southernmost Bavaria, Germany, and the Hölloch (second-longest cave in Europe) and Silberen system karst caves in Switzerland.

== Description ==
The formation is named after the Schrattenfluh in Luzern, Switzerland. The name is derived from the Swiss-German "Schratten" (a synonym of Karren) meaning clints or lapies, a phenomenon that frequently affects the limestone. Kalk is limestone in German. Synonyms for the extensive formation are Hieroglyphenkalk, Calcaire à Hippurites, Urgonien, Rudistenkalk, Urgo-Aptien, Schrattenschichten, Requienenkalk, Rhodanien, Caprotinenkalk, and Urgonian Limestone. The formation consists of three units, the Lower Schrattenkalk, Rawil Member and Upper Schrattenkalk.

The upper and lower units consist mostly of reefal limestones with bryozoa, gastropods, corals, sponges, brachiopods, bivalves and rudists. The Rawil Member contains beds of sandstones and mudstones containing foraminifera and echinoderms. The upper and lower members represent a photozoan-dominated carbonate platform, and was deposited at the northern edge of the Tethys Ocean.

=== Fossil content ===
In 2015, two new corals were described from Austria; Cairnsipsammia, and Paraclausastrea vorarlbergensis.

In an abandoned quarry on the shore of Lake Lucerne, close to the village of Beckenried, fossil trackways were discovered in the formation. The steeply inclined surface has more than 50 tracks (in three trackways) of ornithopod dinosaurs that are attributed to iguanodontids. Three trackways can be followed for distances of 25 to 35 metres (82 to 115 ft). The lengths of the footprints have a mean of 30 centimetres (12 in) and point to animals ranging in size of 4 to 6 metres (13 to 20 ft), with estimated hip heights between 1.8 and 2 metres (5.9 and 6.6 ft) and 1.4 to 1.7 metres (4.6 to 5.6 ft).

== Panorama ==
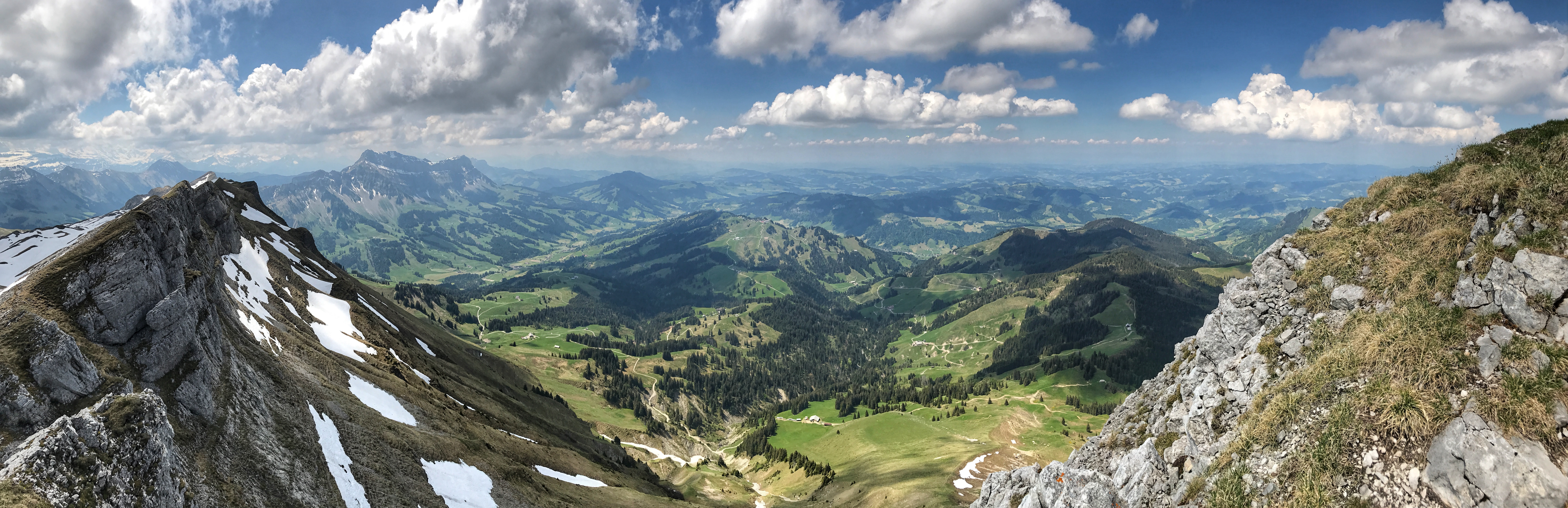
Panorama of the Schrattenkalk at the Schrattenfluh

== See also ==
- List of dinosaur-bearing rock formations
  - List of stratigraphic units with ornithischian tracks
    - Ornithopod tracks
- Geology of the Alps
