= Broome Sandstone =

Geological formation in Western Australia

- Stratigraphic range: Valanginian-Barremian; ~140–126 Ma
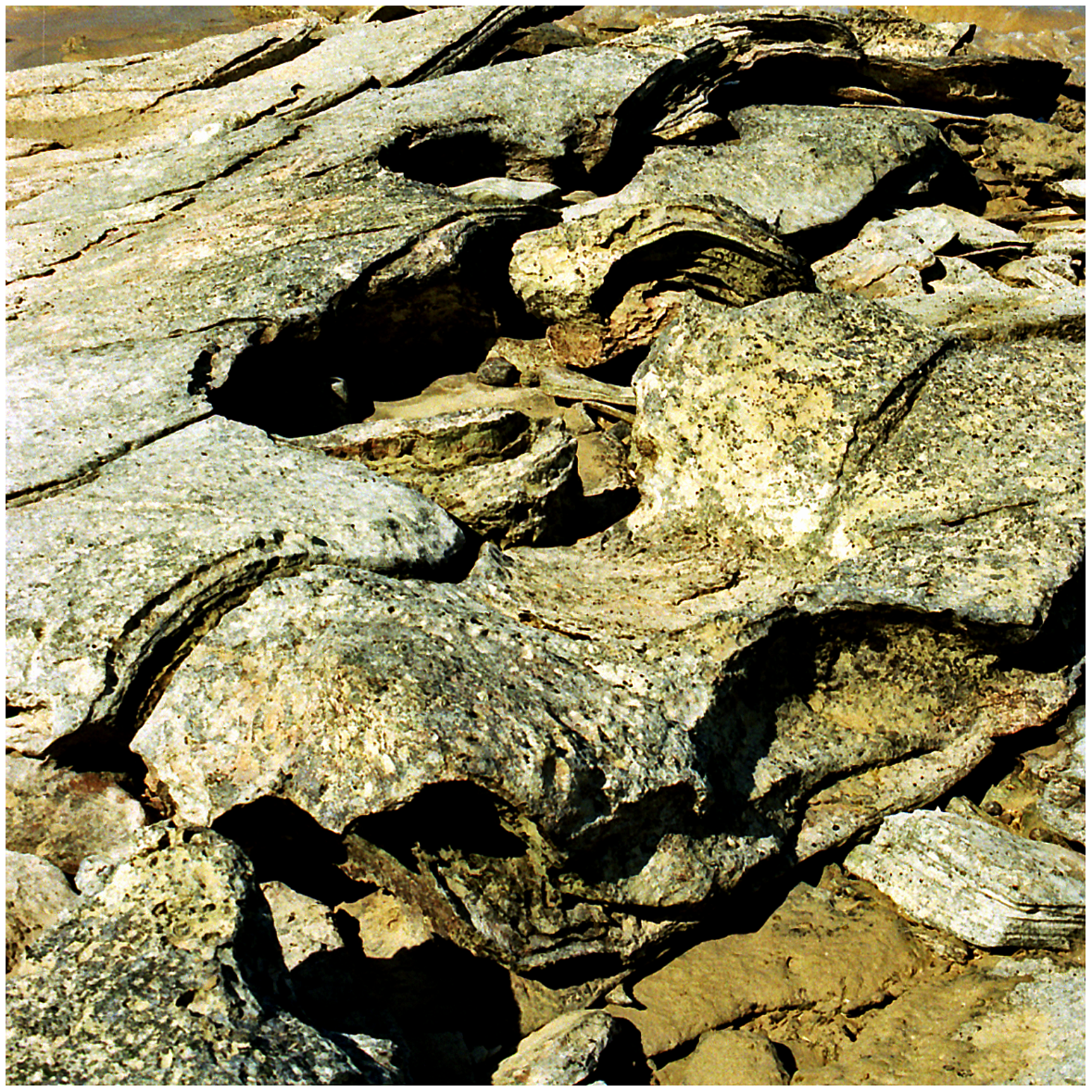
- Part of a sauropod trackway in the Broome Sandstone. Photographed around 2012.
- Type: Geological formation
- Unit of: Dampier Group
- Underlies: Melligo Sandstone
- Overlies: Jarlemai Siltstone (Unconformity), Broome Buchia Beds, Baleine Formation
- Thickness: 300 m (980 ft)

Lithology
- Primary: Sandstone
- Other: Mudstone, siltstone, conglomerate

Location
- Coordinates: 17.5°S 122.1°E
- Approximate paleocoordinates: 50.5°S 86.9°E
- Region: Western Australia
- Country: Australia
- Extent: Carnarvon Basin; Bedout Sub-basin
- Broome Sandstone (Australia)

The Broome Sandstone, formerly known as the Broome Beds, is an Early Cretaceous geologic formation found in Western Australia, and formerly considered part of Dampier Group. Fossil sauropod tracks, belonging to an unknown ichnotaxon, and stegosaur tracks belonging to the ichnogenus and species Garbina roeorum have been reported from the formation since the 1990s.

== See also ==
- List of dinosaur-bearing rock formations
  - List of stratigraphic units with ornithischian tracks
    - Stegosaur tracks
