= Nagatogawa Formation =

Geologic formation in Japan

- Type: Geological formation

Location
- Country: Japan

The Nagatogawa Formation is a Mesozoic geologic formation in Japan. Fossil ornithopod tracks have been reported from the formation.

== See also ==
- List of dinosaur-bearing rock formations
  - List of stratigraphic units with ornithischian tracks
    - Ornithopod tracks
