= Xiguayuan Formation =

Geologic formation in China

- Stratigraphic range: Barremian; ~129–125 Ma
- Type: Geological formation
- Underlies: Quaternary sediments
- Overlies: Zhangjiakou Formation
- Thickness: Up to 2,500 m (8,200 ft)

Lithology
- Primary: Conglomerate, sandstone, siltstone, mudstone
- Other: Volcanic and pyroclastic sediments

Location
- Coordinates: 45.9°N 117.3°E
- Approximate paleocoordinates: 48.8°N 117.4°E
- Region: Hebei
- Country: China
- Xiguayuan Formation (China) Xiguayuan Formation (Hebei)

The Xiguayuan Formation is an Early Cretaceous (Barremian) geologic formation in Hebei Province of China. Fossil ornithopod tracks have been reported from the formation. It was deposited in a shallow lacustrine setting and is noted for its hyperpycnite facies.

== Fossil content ==
The formation has provided the following fossils:

Ichnofossils

- Iguanodontia indet.
- Theropoda indet.

Insects

- Gurvanomyia rohdendorfi
- Huaxiaplecia zhongguanensis
- Longhuaia orientalis

Bivalves

- Weichangella caelata

== See also ==
- List of dinosaur-bearing rock formations
  - List of stratigraphic units with ornithischian tracks
    - Ornithopod tracks
