= Tantalus Formation =

Geologic formation in Canada

- Type: Geological formation

Location
- Region: Yukon
- Country: Canada

The Tantalus Formation is a Mesozoic geologic formation in Yukon. Fossil ankylosaur tracks have been reported from the formation.

== See also ==
- List of dinosaur-bearing rock formations
  - List of stratigraphic units with ornithischian tracks
    - Ankylosaur tracks
