= Shirabad Formation =

Geologic formation in Tajikistan

- Stratigraphic range: Late Albian; ~105–100 Ma
- Type: Geological formation

Lithology
- Primary: Sandstone
- Other: Gypsum

Location
- Coordinates: 38.6°N 68.2°E
- Approximate paleocoordinates: 35.2°N 64.2°E
- Country: Tajikistan
- Shirabad Formation (Tajikistan)

The Shirabad Formation is a late Albian geologic formation in Tajikistan.

== Fossil content ==
Fossil ankylosaur tracks described as Macropodosauropus gravis have been reported from the formation.

== See also ==
- List of dinosaur-bearing rock formations
  - List of stratigraphic units with ornithischian tracks
    - Ankylosaur tracks
