= Ravenscar Group =

- Stratigraphic range: Middle Jurassic Aalenian to Bathonian
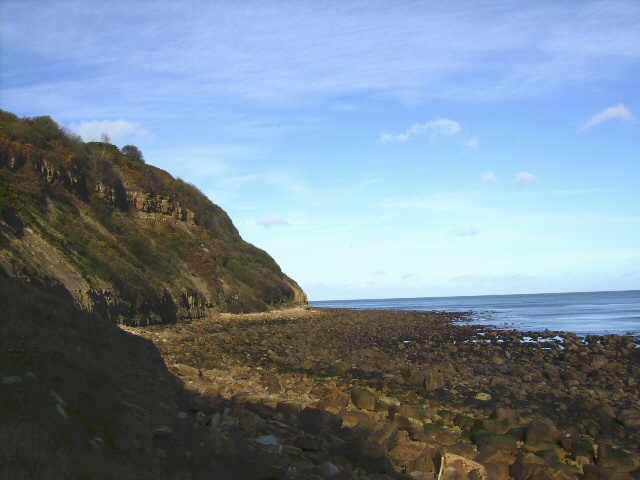
- Sandstones and mudstones of the Saltwick Formation exposed on the cliffs near Herbert Hole, south of Ravenscar, North Yorkshire
- Type: Group
- Sub-units: Saltwick Formation, Eller Beck Formation, Cloughton Formation, Scarborough Formation and Scalby Formation
- Underlies: Cornbrash Formation
- Overlies: Dogger Formation
- Thickness: 114m to c240m

Lithology
- Primary: sandstone
- Other: mudstone, limestone, ironstone, coal

Location
- Country: England
- Extent: Cleveland Basin, North Yorkshire

Type section
- Named for: Ravenscar

The Ravenscar Group is a Jurassic lithostratigraphic group (a sequence of rock strata) found within the Cleveland Basin of North Yorkshire, extending into both the Hambleton and Howardian Hills. The name is derived from Ravenscar on the North Yorkshire coast, where rocks of this age occur. It was previously known as the 'Middle Jurassic Series'. It is stratigraphic equivalent to the Inferior Oolite Group and most of the Great Oolite Group, being overlain by the Cornbrash Formation of the latter unit.
