= Vilquechico Formation =

Geologic formation in Peru

- Stratigraphic range: Late Campanian-Late Maastrichtian; ~76–66 Ma
- Type: Geological formation
- Underlies: Auzangate Formation
- Overlies: Ayabacas Formation

Lithology
- Primary: Sandstone
- Other: Shale

Location
- Coordinates: 15°13′03″S 69°40′56″W
- Region: Puno Department
- Country: Peru

Type section
- Named for: Vilquechico
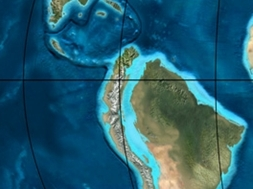
- Paleogeography of Northern South America, 65 Ma by Ron Blakey

Type locality of the Vilquichico Formation in Peru

The Vilquechico Formation is a Late Campanian to Late Maastrichtian geologic formation in southern Peru. Fossil ornithopod tracks have been reported from the formation. The formation overlies the Ayabacas Formation and is overlain by the Auzangate Formation.

== Paleofauna ==
In the formation, tracks of the following species have been found:

- Ornithomimipus jaillardi
- Hadrosaurichnus titicacaensis

== See also ==
- List of dinosaur-bearing rock formations
  - List of stratigraphic units with ornithischian tracks
    - Ornithopod tracks
