= Abu Agag Formation =

Geological formation in Egypt and Sudan

- Stratigraphic range: Turonian
- Type: Geological formation

Lithology
- Primary: Sandstone
- Other: Siltstone

Location
- Coordinates: 23.5°N 33.0°E
- Approximate paleocoordinates: 4.3°N 26.9°E
- Country: Egypt, Sudan
- Abu Agag Formation (Egypt)

The Abu Agag Formation is a Turonian geologic formation in Egypt and Sudan. Indeterminate fossil ornithischian tracks have been reported from the formation.

== Description ==
The formation comprises intercalated sandstones and highly bioturbated sand- and siltstone layers which are horizontal and wavy bedded. Horizontally laminated and thin bedded fine-grained sandstones as well as flaser- and ripple cross-lamination characterize a low-energy environment within this fluvial succession.

== Fossil content ==
The following fossils have been reported from the formation:

- Planolites sp.
- Rhynchosauroides sp.
- cf. Rotodactylus sp.
- Scoyenia sp.
- Spirodesmos sp.
- Dinosauria indet.
- ?Ornithischia indet.

== See also ==
- List of dinosaur-bearing rock formations
- List of stratigraphic units with indeterminate dinosaur fossils
  - List of stratigraphic units with ornithischian tracks
    - Indeterminate ornithischian tracks
