= Calcare di Bari =

Geologic formation in Italy

- Stratigraphic range: Valanginian-early Turonian; ~138–93 Ma
- Type: Geological formation
- Sub-units: Avvantaggio, Montericco, Palorbitoline, Corato, Bisceglie & Sannicandro Members
- Underlies: Calcare di Altamura
- Overlies: not observed
- Area: 100 km^{2} (39 sq mi)
- Thickness: Up to 2,000 m (6,600 ft)

Lithology
- Primary: Limestone
- Other: Dolomite

Location
- Coordinates: 41.2°N 16.5°E
- Approximate paleocoordinates: 24.3°N 20.3°E
- Region: Apulia
- Country: Italy
- Extent: Apulian Platform

Type section
- Named for: Bari
- Named by: Valduga
- Location: Petraro Quarry
- Year defined: 1965
- Coordinates: 41.2869°N 16.2855°E
- Region: Apulia
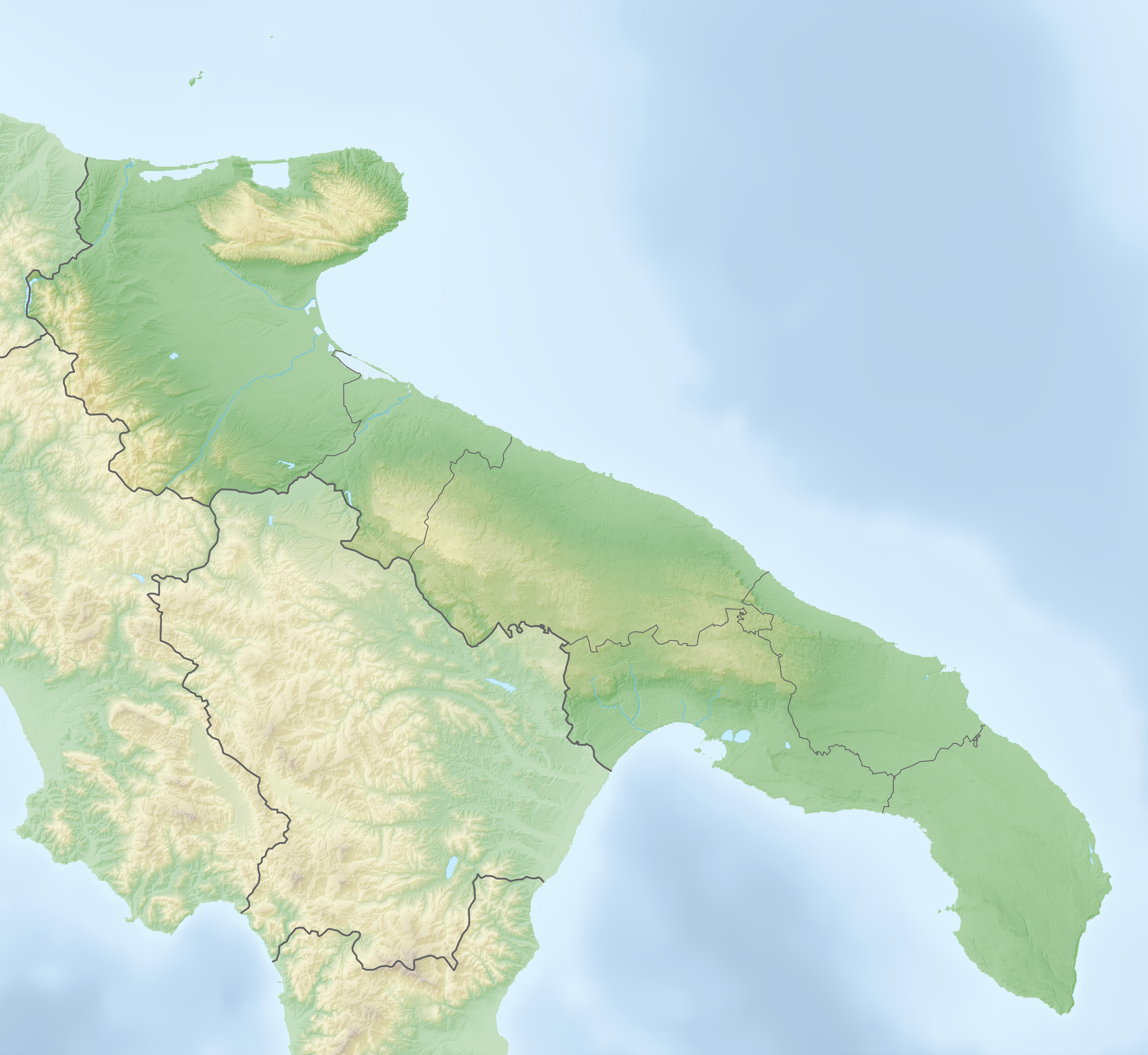
- Calcare di Bari (Italy) Calcare di Bari (Apulia)

The Calcare di Bari (Italian for Bari Limestone) is a Cretaceous (Valanginian to early Turonian, spanning approximately 45 million years) geologic formation in Apulia, southeastern Italy. The formation comprises micritic limestones, in places karstified and dolomitized. Rudists and fossil ankylosaur, sauropod and theropod tracks have been reported from the 2,000 metres (6,600 ft) thick formation that was deposited in an inner carbonate platform environment towards the top dominated by rudist reefs.

== Description ==
The Calcare di Bari underlies the Calcare di Altamura, separated by an unconformity. The base of the formation is not recognized in outcrop. The Calcare di Bari is subdivided into the Avvantaggio, Montericco, Palorbitoline, Corato, Bisceglie and Sannicandro Members. The formation crops out around the Bari–Taranto railway.

The formation comprises micritic and dolomitic limestones containing foraminifera with several levels of rudists. The depositional environment of the formation has been interpreted as inner platform with tidal and lagoonal influence. The formation crops out across an area of about 100 square kilometres (39 sq mi), and the total thickness has been estimated at 2,000 metres (6,600 ft).

From the Valanginian to the early Aptian the present region of Apulia was dominated by a very shallow carbonate platform characterized by tranquil waters, evidenced by the muddy to marly limestones. Deepening occurred in the upper part of the formation with subtidal deposits containing a rudist reefal fauna.

The upper part of the formation is dated to the Cenomanian based on the presence of the microfossils Sauvagesia sharpei, Chrysalidina gradata, Pseudolituonella reicheli, Pseudorhapydionina dubia, Nummofallotia apula, Nezzazata sp. and algae Heteroporella lepina. The uppermost part is dated to the early Turonian.

== Fossil content ==
The formation has provided ichnofossils of:

- Ankylosauria indet.
- Sauropoda indet.
- Theropoda indet.

Foraminifera

- Miliolidae indet.

== See also ==
- List of fossiliferous stratigraphic units in Italy
- List of dinosaur-bearing rock formations
  - List of stratigraphic units with ornithischian tracks
    - Ankylosaur tracks
