= South Platte Formation =

Mesozoic geologic formation in Colorado

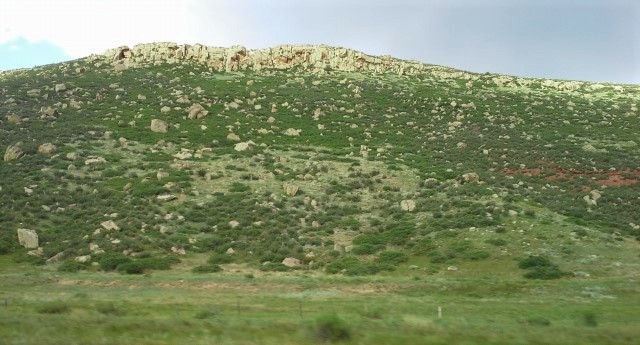
- Dakota Hogback, highest outcrops are from the South Platte Formation
- Type: Geological formation

The South Platte Formation is a Mesozoic geologic formation found in the U.S. state of Colorado. Fossil ankylosaur tracks have been reported from the formation.

== See also ==
- List of dinosaur-bearing rock formations
  - List of stratigraphic units with ornithischian tracks
    - Ankylosaur tracks
