= Tongfosi Formation =

Geologic formation in China

- Stratigraphic range: Cenomanian; ~99–94 Ma
- Type: Geological formation
- Unit of: Yanji Group

Lithology
- Primary: Sandstone

Location
- Coordinates: 42.9°N 129.2°E
- Approximate paleocoordinates: 49.5°N 121.1°E
- Region: Jilin
- Country: China

Type section
- Named for: Tongfosi, Yanbian, Jilin
- Named by: Zhou Zhiyan
- Year defined: 1962
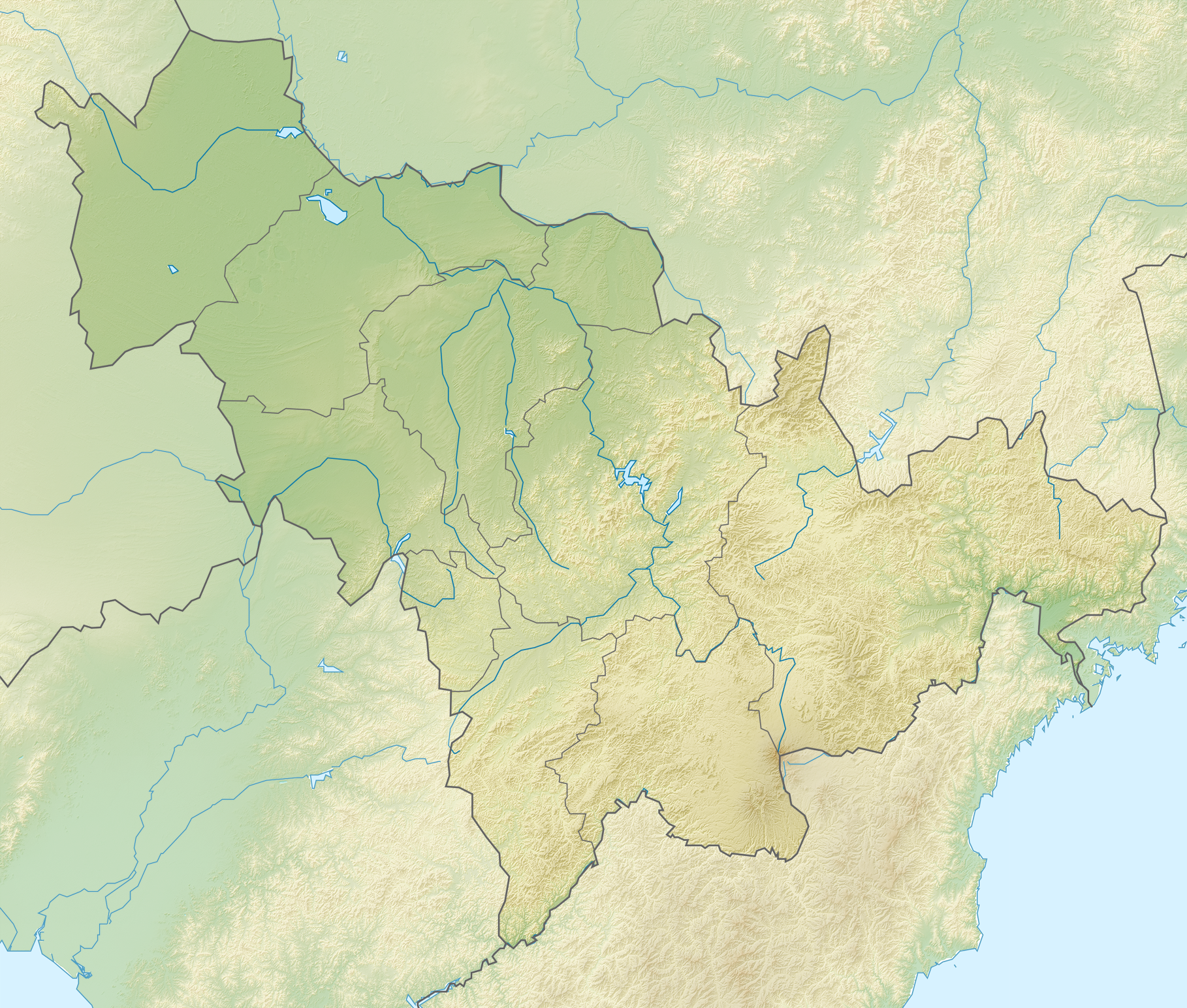
- Tongfosi Formation (China) Tongfosi Formation (Jilin)

The Tongfosi Formation (Chinese: 铜佛寺组; pinyin: tóngfósì zǔ) is a Late Cretaceous (Cenomanian) geologic formation of the Yanji Group in China. Fossil ornithopod tracks of iguanodontids and theropods have been reported from the fluvial sandstones of the formation.

== See also ==
- List of dinosaur-bearing rock formations
  - List of stratigraphic units with ornithischian tracks
    - Ornithopod tracks
