= Castlegate Sandstone =

Mesozoic geologic formation in the United States

- Stratigraphic range: Campanian
- Type: Geological formation

The Castlegate Sandstone is a Mesozoic geologic formation in the United States. Dinosaur remains are among the fossils that have been recovered from the formation, although none have yet been referred to a specific genus.

Castlegate Sandstone at the type locality exposed in a road cut in Price Canyon, Carbon County, Utah

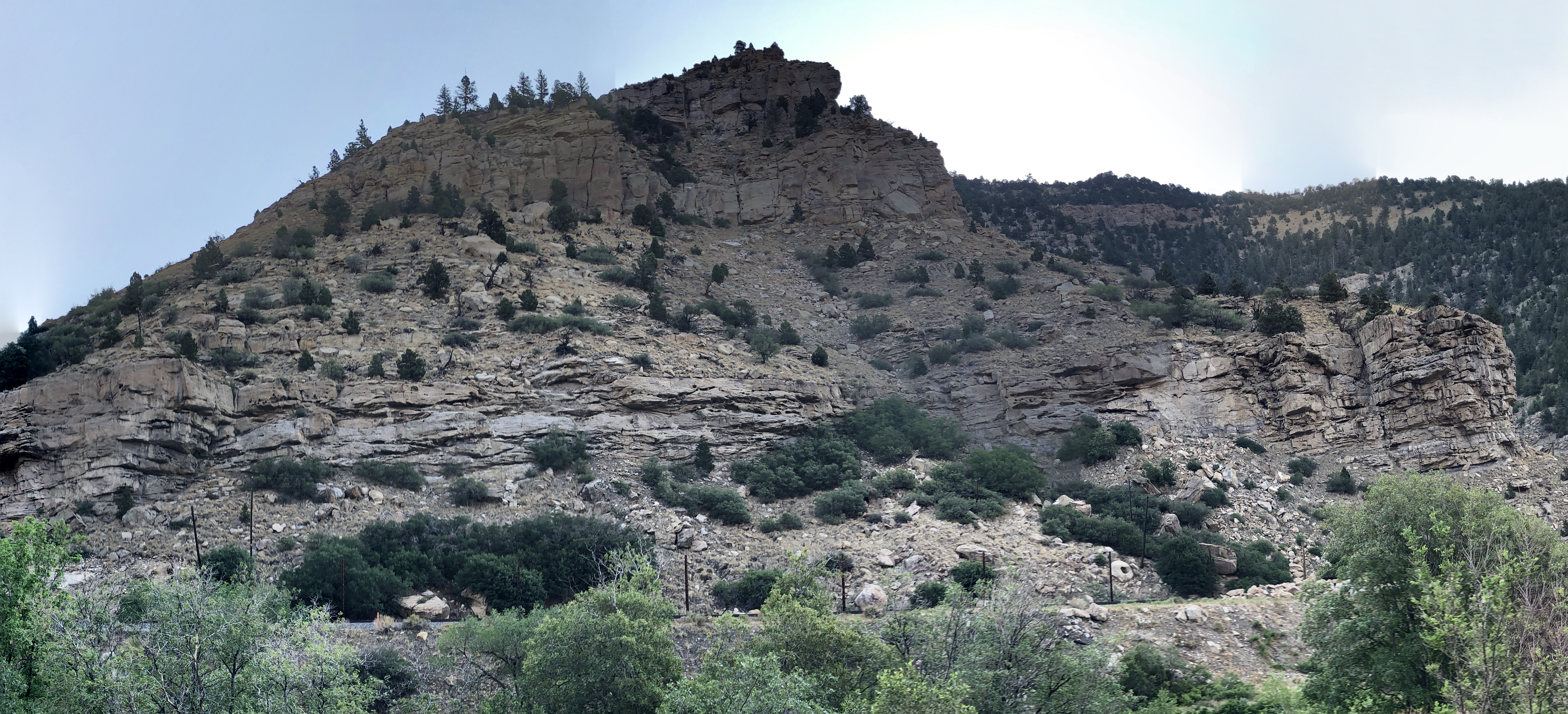
Castlegate Sandstone overlain by the Price River Formation, Price Canyon, Carbon County, Utah

Description

Composed of light gray to dark gray, thin bedded to massive, platy, fine to coarse grained, quartzose sandstone. Some conglomerate beds. The sandstone beds of the Castlegate are chiefly gray, unlike the sandstone beds of the underlying Blackhawk Formation, which are commonly some shade of brown. Locally, the Castlegate Sandstone beds are white. Commonly forms cliffs or steep slopes. The sandstone was deposited by rivers during the Late Cretaceous. The Castlegate Sandstone is 130-500 feet (40-155 m) thick.

It gets its name from the gate-like passage that used to exist at the type section in Price Canyon. The western side of the gate was removed during highway improvement, which exposed most of the stratum. Fossil pollen indicate a late Campanian age.

== See also ==
- List of dinosaur-bearing rock formations
  - List of stratigraphic units with indeterminate dinosaur fossils
