= Cloughton Formation =

Geologic formation in England, UK

- Stratigraphic range: Bajocian
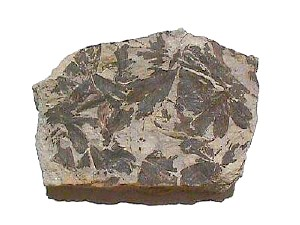
- Fossil Plant, ginkgo, Cloughton Formation
- Type: Formation
- Unit of: Ravenscar Group
- Sub-units: Sycarham Member, Lebberston Member, Gristhorpe Member
- Underlies: Scarborough Formation
- Overlies: Eller Beck Formation
- Thickness: 50 to 70m on the North Yorkshire Coast between Whitby and Scarborough and inland in the North Yorkshire Moors and Cleveland Hills; 36 to 50m (thinning southwards) on the western escarpment of the North Yorkshire Moors

Lithology
- Primary: Mudstone, Siltstone
- Other: Sandstone, Limestone, Coal

Location
- Region: England
- Country: United Kingdom
- Extent: Yorkshire

Type section
- Named for: Cloughton

The Cloughton Formation is a geologic formation in England. It preserves fossils dating back to the Jurassic period.

== See also ==
- List of fossiliferous stratigraphic units in England
