= Characichnos =

Characichnos Temporal range: Middle Jurassic (Aalenian), ~174–170 Ma

Trace fossil classification
- Kingdom: Animalia
- Phylum: Chordata
- Clade: Tetrapoda
- Class: incertae sedis
- Ichnogenus: †Characichnos; Whyte & Romano, 2001

Type ichnospecies
- †Characichnos tridactylus Whyte & Romano, 2001

Dinosaur footprint

Characichnos (meaning "score trace") is an ichnogenus of possibly dinosaurian tetrapod footprint. It includes a single species, C. tridactylus, known from prints found in the Middle Jurassic Saltwick Formation of Yorkshire, United Kingdom.

== Description ==
Characichnos traces were created by a "punting" tetrapod, meaning that the animal was drifting or partially buoyant in a body of water, and touching or pushing off from the ground with the feet.

== Paleoecology ==
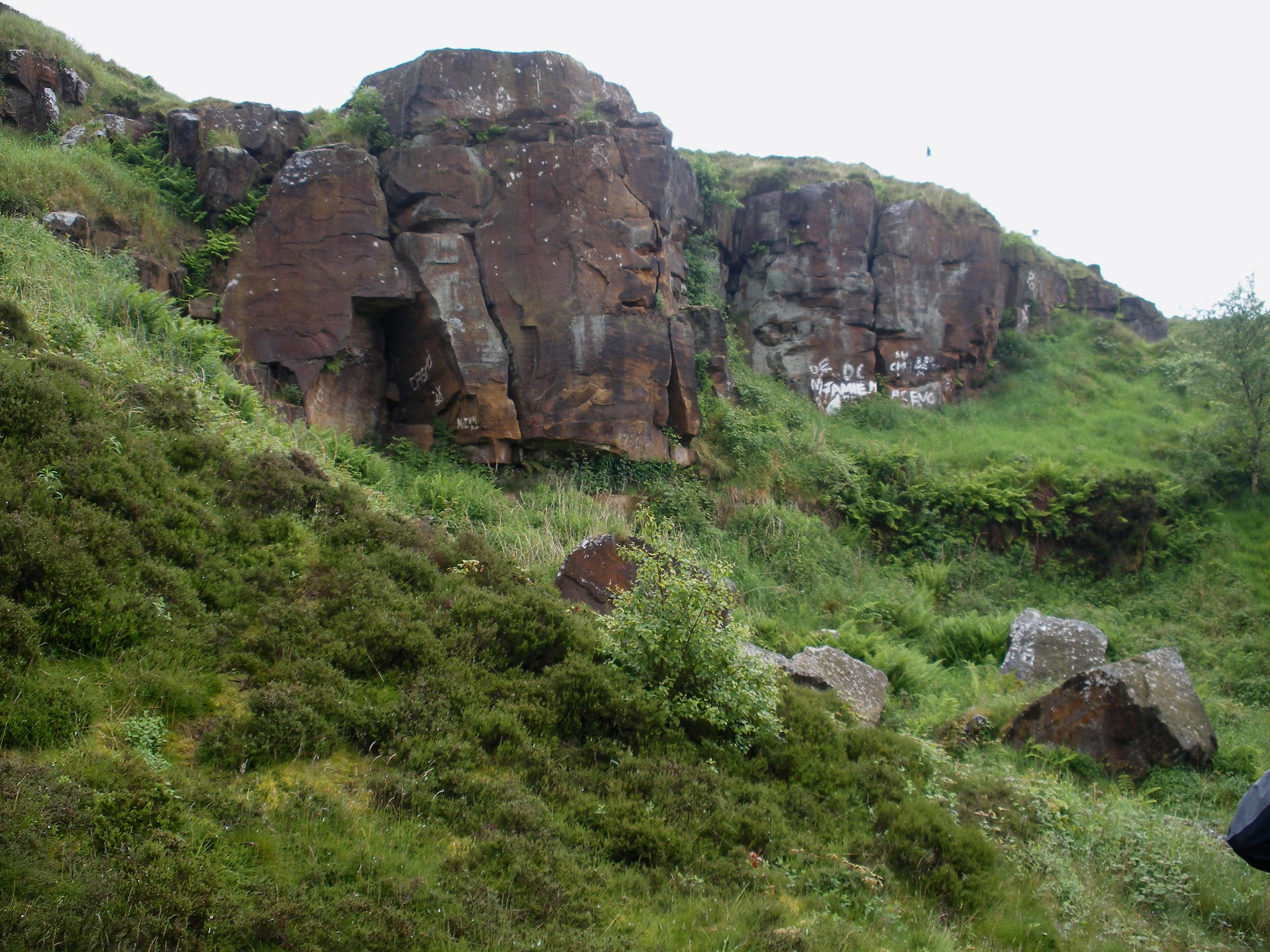
Outcrop of the Saltwick Formation

Other fossils from the Saltwick Formation consist of stegosaurian footprints and a caudal vertebra belonging to an eusauropod, nicknamed "Alan".

== See also ==
- List of dinosaur ichnogenera
