= Calcare di Altamura =

Geologic formation in Italy

- Stratigraphic range: Coniacian-early Campanian; ~88–80 Ma
- Type: Geological formation
- Sub-units: Loferitique, Stromatolique & Gorjanovicia Members
- Underlies: Calcare di Caranna
- Overlies: Calcare di Bari

Lithology
- Primary: Limestone
- Other: Dolomite

Location
- Coordinates: 40.8°N 16.6°E
- Approximate paleocoordinates: 25.0°N 15.9°E
- Region: Apulia
- Country: Italy
- Extent: Apulian Platform

Type section
- Named for: Altamura
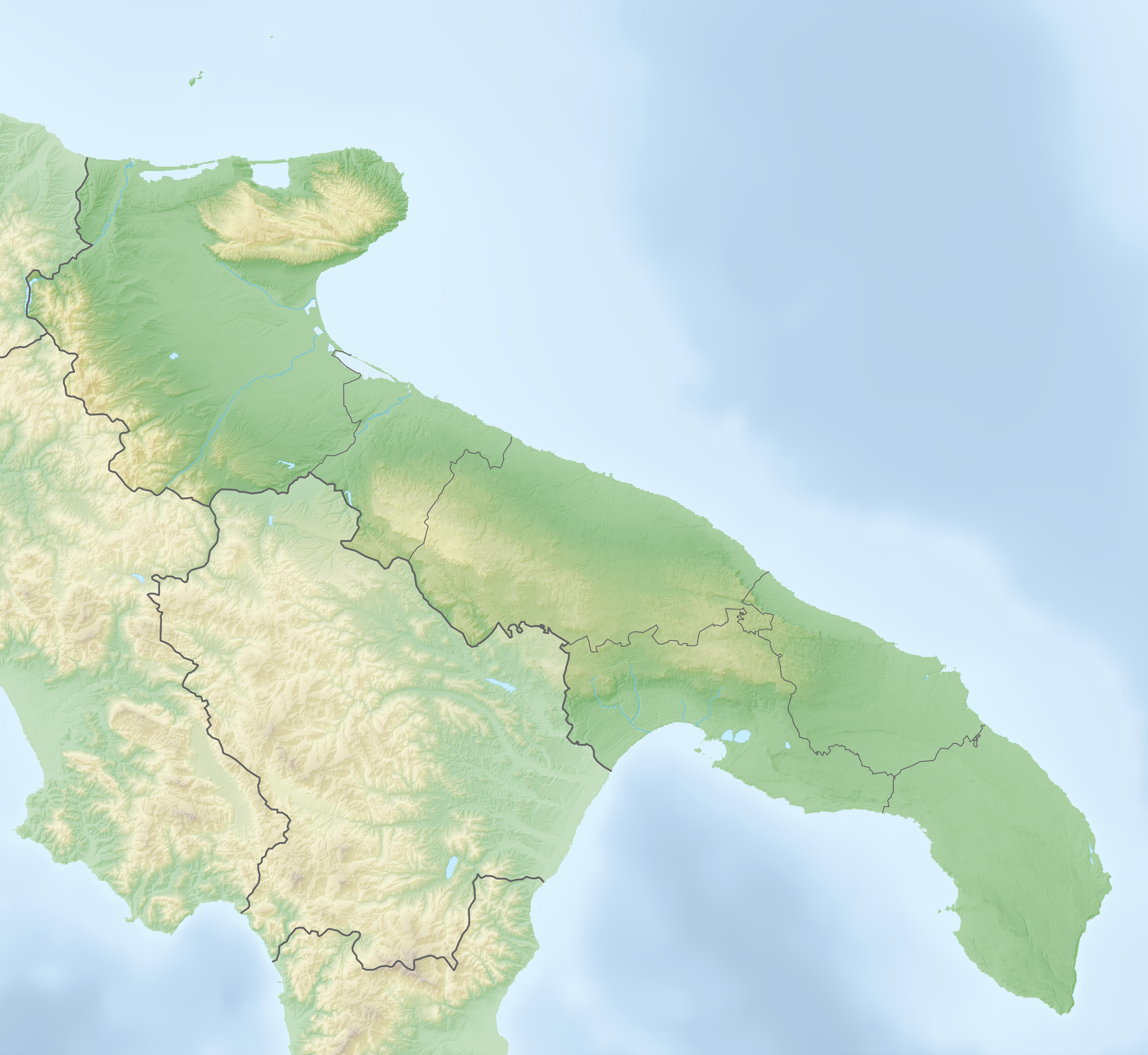
- Calcare di Altamura (Italy) Calcare di Altamura (Apulia)

The Calcare di Altamura (Italian for Altamura Limestone) is a Coniacian to early Campanian geologic formation in Italy. The formation comprises limestones that are highly fractured, in places karstified and dolomitized. Fossil ankylosaur tracks have been reported from the formation.

== Description ==
The Calcare di Altamura overlies the Calcare di Bari, separated by an unconformity and is overlain by the Calcare di Caranna, separated by a transgressive angular unconformity. The Calcare di Altamura is subdivided into the Loferitique, Stromatolique and Gorjanovicia Members. The formation comprises limestones with some levels of dolomitization. The succession starts with a sequence of stromatolites and is heavily fractured and karstified. The formation crops out south of the Bari–Taranto railway. The lower part of the formation is dated to the Coniacian based on the presence of the microfossils Aeolisaccus kotori, Thaumatoporella parvovesiculifera, Accordiella conica and Moncharmontia appenninica. The upper part is dated to the early Campanian.

== Fossil content ==
The formation has provided ichnofossils of:

- Apulosauripus federicianus
- Ankylosauria indet.

== See also ==
- Dinosaur Quarry of Altamura
- List of fossiliferous stratigraphic units in Italy
- List of dinosaur-bearing rock formations
  - List of stratigraphic units with ornithischian tracks
    - Ankylosaur tracks
