= Scarborough Formation =

Geologic formation in Yorkshire, England

- Stratigraphic range: Bajocian
- Type: Formation
- Unit of: Ravenscar Group
- Sub-units: Helwath Beck Member, Hundale Shale Member, Hundale Sandstone Member, Spindle Thorn Limestone Member, Ravenscar Shale Member, White Nab Ironstone Member, Bogmire Gill Member
- Underlies: Scalby Formation
- Overlies: Cloughton Formation
- Thickness: 3-30 m

Lithology
- Primary: Limestone, Mudstone, Siltstone, Sandstone
- Other: Ironstone

Location
- Region: Europe
- Country: United Kingdom
- Extent: Yorkshire

Type section
- Named for: Scarborough, North Yorkshire
- Location: Hundale Point

The Scarborough Formation is a geologic formation in England. It is part of the Ravenscar Group, and was deposited in the Bajocian of the Middle Jurassic.
