= Blackhawk Formation =

Geologic formation in Utah, United States

- Stratigraphic range: Campanian; ~85–75 Ma
- Coal, sandstones and carbonaceous mudstones of the Blackhawk Formation exposed along U.S. Highway 6, Price Canyon, Carbon County Utah.
- Type: Geological formation

Location
- Region: Utah
- Country: United States

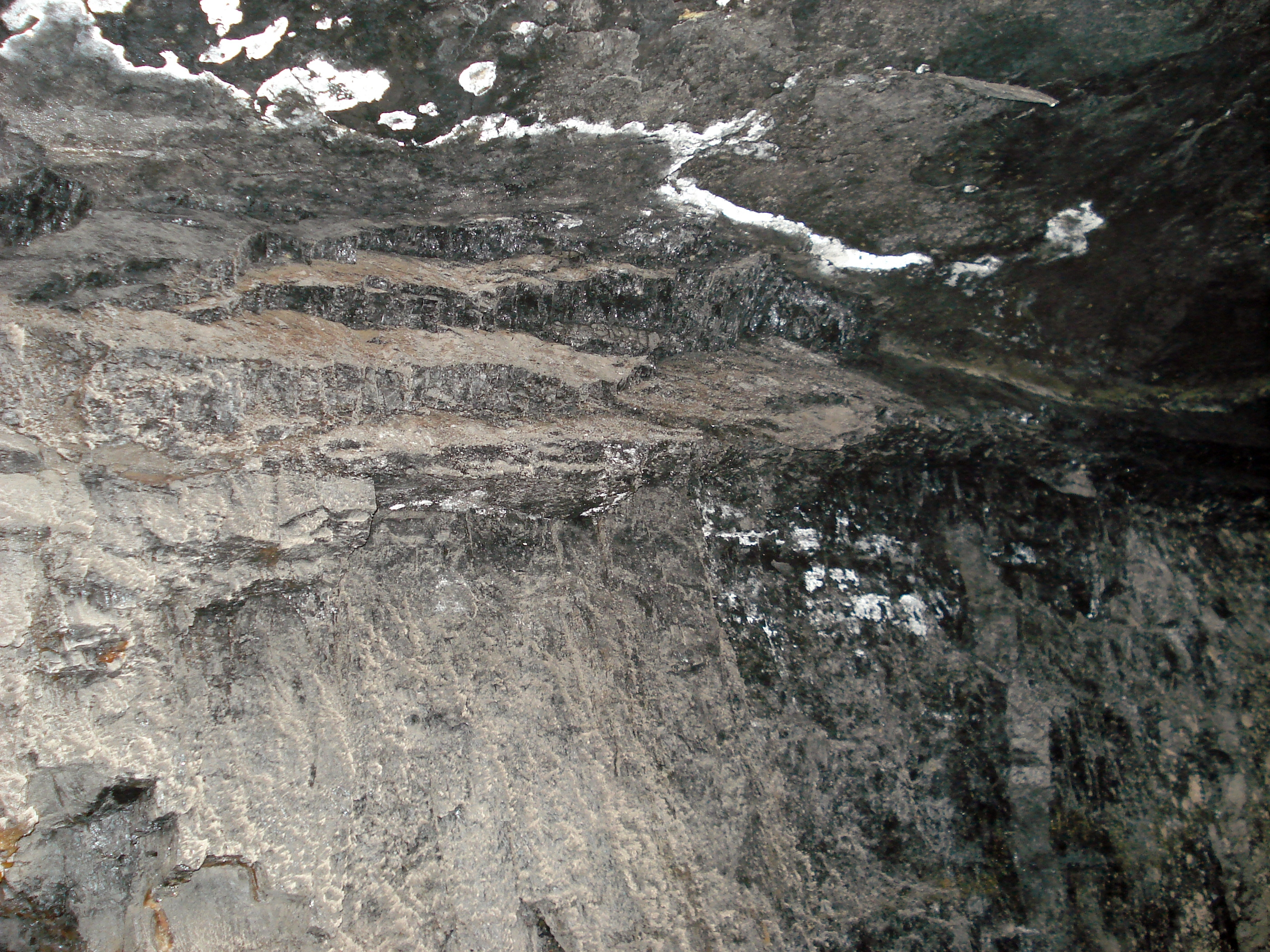
Coal seam in the Blackhawk Formation, Skyline Mine

The Blackhawk Formation is a geological formation in east-central Utah, United States. It was named for the former town of Blackhawk on the east side of the Wastach Plateau, Carbon County. The formation is composed of mostly light-brown, light-gray and brownish-gray, thin- to medium-bedded, fine- to medium-grained quartzose sandstone that is interbedded with shaly siltstone, shale, carbonaceous shale, and coal. There are many thin to thick bituminous coal seams, including several economically important beds, such as the Sunnyside Coal. The formation thickness ranges from about 120 m (400 ft) to about 270 m (900 ft). It conformably overlies the Star Point Sandstone and unconformably underlies the Castlegate Sandstone.

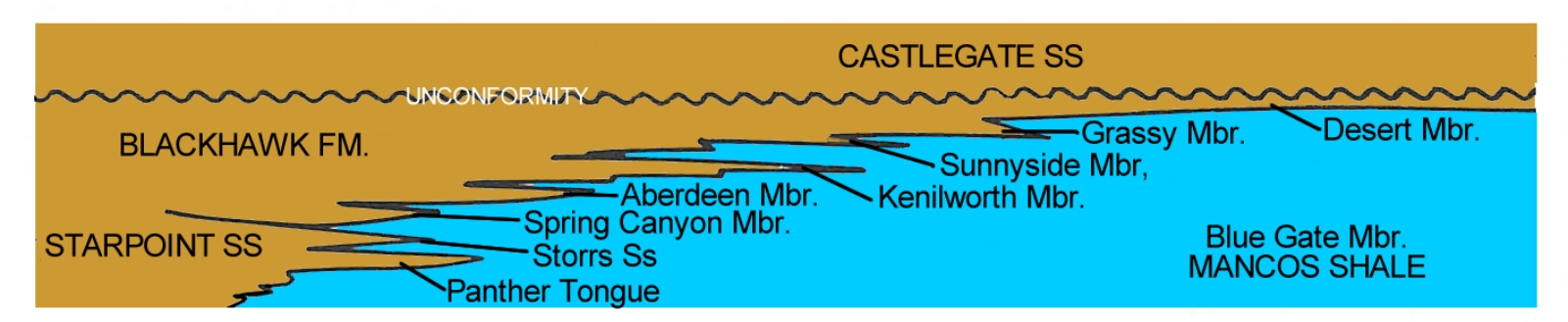
The Blackhawk Formation is the withdrawal (regressive) phase of the Cretaceous Seaway in eastern Utah.

The sediments that formed the Blackhawk Formation originated from erosion of the Sevier Uplift in western Utah. This sediment was transported eastwards by rivers and deposited on the western coast of the Cretaceous Seaway. At this time, the Seaway was also withdrawing (regression) eastwards, but this was irregular, with occasional episodes of the sea advancing (transgression) to cover coastal lands. This transgression was partially as a result of fluctuating (eustatic) global sea level changes and partly as a result of the shift position of the deltas. These events created wedges of terrestrial sedimentary rock between wedges of marine sedimentary rock (Mancos Shale). These wedges of the Blackhawk Formation have been given names and many of them contain economically important bituminous coal zones, such as the Kenilworth Coal that is up to 11 m (37 feet) thick. The coast probably resembled the Gulf Coast today, being composed of a broad coastal plain, with meandering rivers that ended in wave-dominated deltas. These deltas were flanked by sandy beaches. Swamps were probably developed on the delta plains and on the floodplain (bottomlands) adjacent to the meandering rivers, rather than in brackish-water of lagoons because of the low sulfur content of the coals.

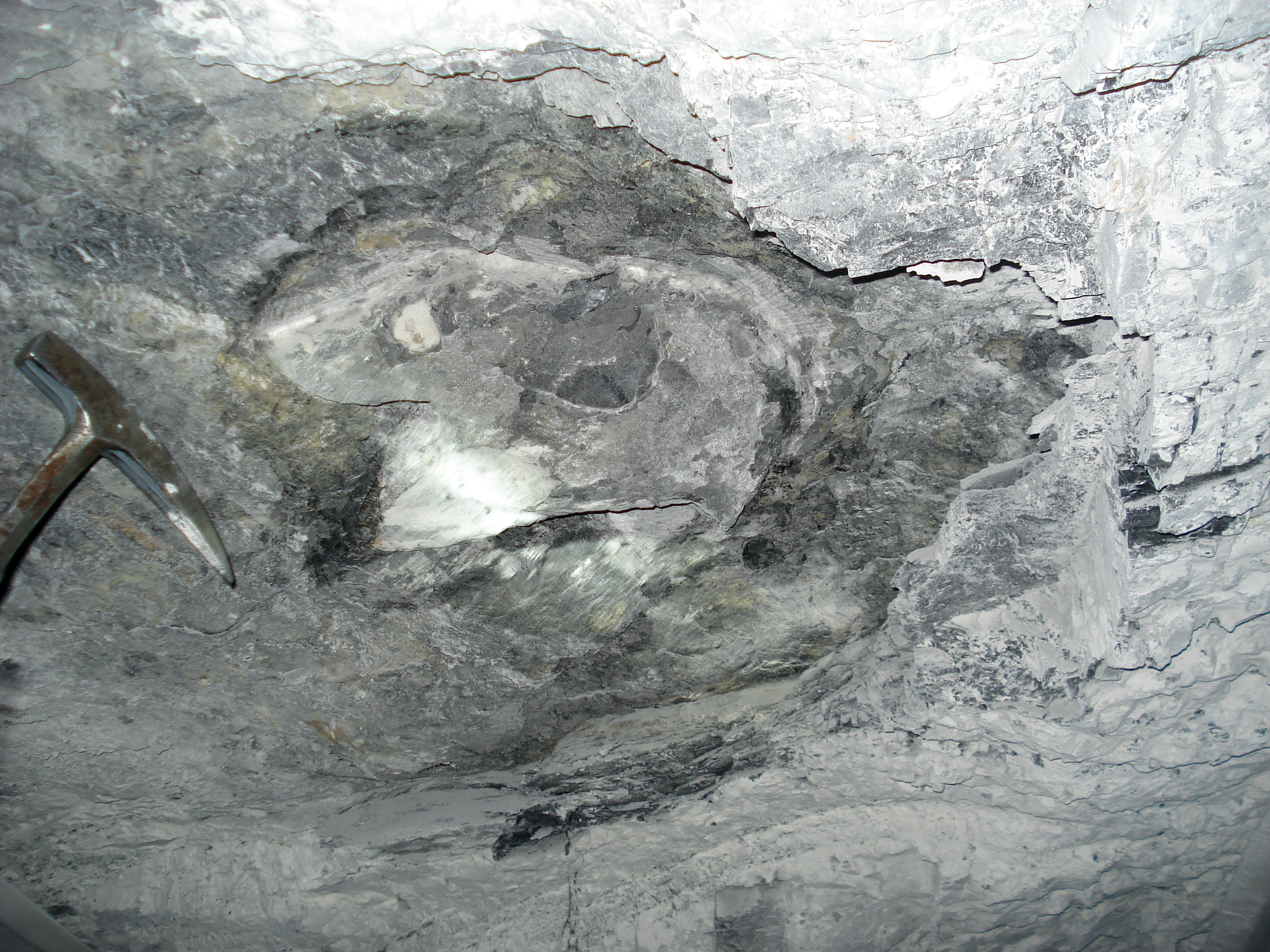
Hadrosaur track in the ceiling of a coal mine.

== Paleontology ==
Fossil plants are extremely common in the Blackhawk Formation. Their distribution is closely tied to specific environments, just like plants are today. The plant community of the swamp environment was dominated by the evergreen conifer Sequoia cuneata and a deciduous angiosperm tree Rhamnites eminens. Other, less abundant trees include Protophyllocladus polymorpha, Moriconia cyclotoxon, Brachyphyllum squammnosum, Podozamites sp., and the angiosperms “Cissus” marginata, Platanus raynoldsii, "Cornus” praetimpressa, Dryophyllum subfalcatum, “Ficus” planicostata, and Myrtophyllum torreyii. Near the swamp margins a small palm, Phoenocites imperialis, grew in thickets. The palm Sabalites grayanus was also present, although not in abundance. The herbaceous understory was composed entirely of two ferns, Cyathea pinnata and Onoclea herbridica. The aquatic plants include a water lily, Nymphaeites dawsoni, a water chestnut, Trapa paulula, and a cattail, Cyperacites. The bottomland community was dominated by the angiosperm trees Platanus raynoldsii and Dryophyllum subfalcatum. Other angiosperm trees also present, but in lesser abundance include Phoenocites, “Cercidophyllum” arcticum, “Ficus” laurophylla, Laurophyllum coloradensis, Manihotites georgiana, Platanus alata, Menispermites sp., and “Viburnum” antiquum; conifers were absent. Ferns were the only understory plants. Overall, the plant communities looked similar to those along the Gulf Coast, although the Blackhawk communities had a larger proportion of conifers and few, if any herbaceous angiosperms in the swamp and bottomland forest understories. Based on angiosperm leaf physiognomy (leaf size, leaf margins and dripping tips), the predominance of medium-size leaves with entire (non-serrated) margins and dripping tips, indicate that the climate was warm temperate- to subtropical, but not tropical. Growth rings in conifer logs and leaf mats from seasonal shedding, also suggests the climate was seasonal. Charcoal occurs indicating that wildfires occasionally swept through the area during the dry season.

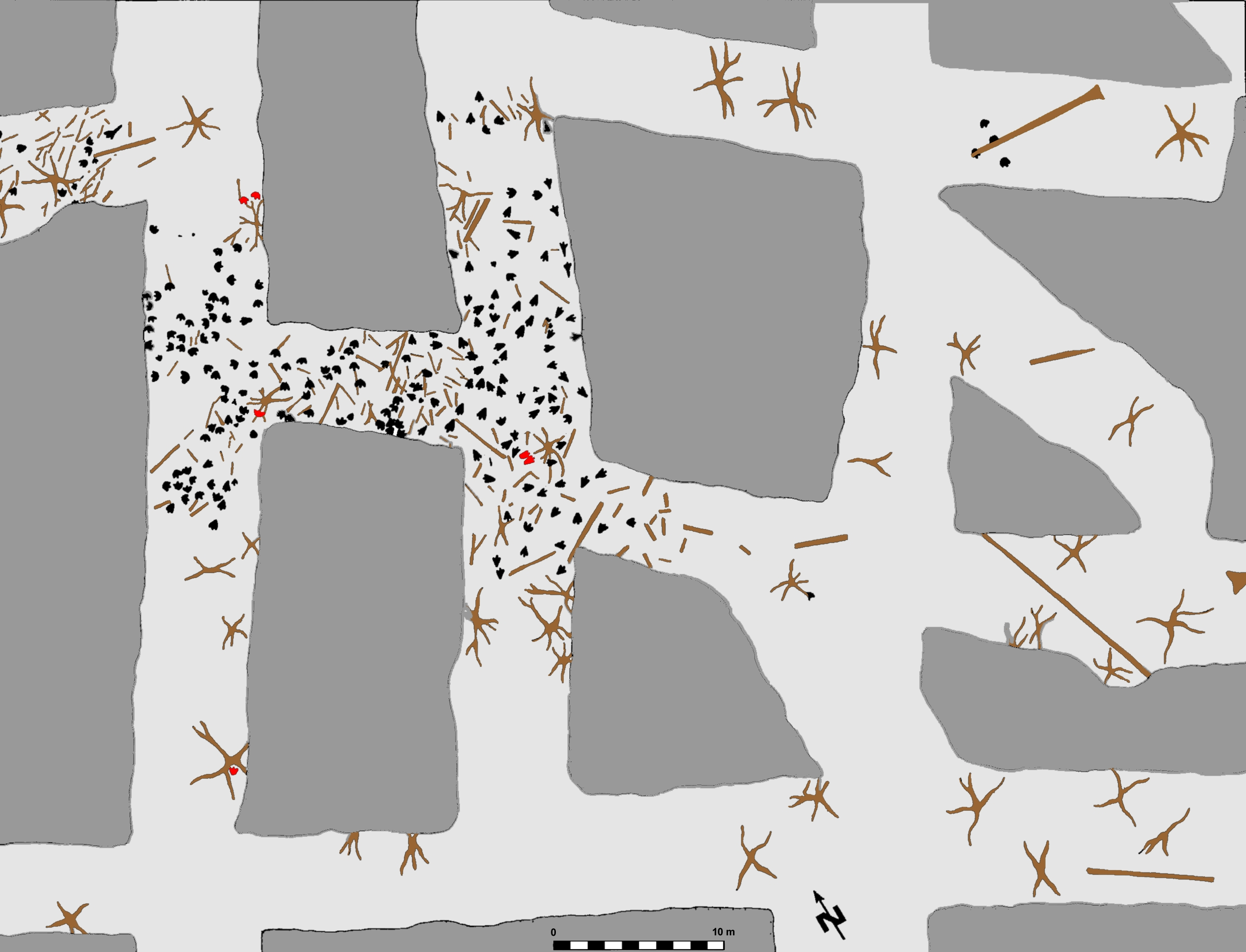
Map of dinosaur tracks in a coal mine in the Blackhawk Formation. Also visible are tree roots and large branches and logs.

Various vertebrates are known to have inhabited the Blackhawk paleoenvironments. These include rare bone fossils of fishes, turtles and crocodiles in the collections of the Prehistoric Museum in Price Utah. The most abundant vertebrate fossils are the tracks of dinosaurs, including the blunt, three-toed hadrosaurs, long, slendered toed theropods, and the short-wide, four-toed ceratopsians. Most of these tracks are found in the mine roof when the coal is removed. They formed when the foot of the living animals pressed into the peat of the swamp bottom. Later, sheets of sand were deposited across the swamp during floods filling in the footprints. Thus, the footprints seen represent the bottom of the foot. The larger tracks used to be removed because of their tendency to fall from the roof and many houses in Carbon and Emery Counties in Utah had a footprint or two in their yards.

Some tracks have elongated heels, which indicate the individuals slipping on exposed wet mud (slipping does not happen in standing water). One of these elongated hadrosaur tracks was named Dinosauropodes and heralded as the footprint of the world's biggest dinosaur. The largest hadrosaur tracks are over 62 cm (24 in.) wide, indicating the presence of huge hadrosaurs the size of Shantungosaurus from China. As yet, no bones of hadrosaurs this size are not known from the Blackhawk Formation. Possible pterosaur tracks have been reported from the Kenilworth Mine near Helper, Utah. Problematically, however, these tracks seem to be only those of the wing-hand and do not include any foot (pes) tracks. These asymmetrical three-digit tracks were previously thought to belong to the aquatic bird Hesperornis. A few, rare dinosaur bones have been recovered from the mines, including ceratospian and possibly hadrosaur.

The hadrosaur tracks from the Blackhawk Formation provide insights into the behavior of these dinosaurs that is not available from their skeletons. These tracks provide a snapshot into the lives of these dinosaurs. First, hadrosaur tracks are by far the most abundant of the track types, which supports the observation from bone beds that hadrosaurs were numerically the most abundant dinosaurs during the Late Cretaceous of North America. We can see this in a map of tracks from the Kenilworth Mine. Although one individual milling around can leave hundreds of tracks, the abundance of different sized tracks and that some trackways indicate individuals passing through suggests that a herd of different-sized hadrosaurs had made the tracks. Some of the tracks seems to show individuals standing at the base of conifer trees, whose spreading roots indicate trees in growth position (see red tracks on map). These individuals may have been feeding, thus supporting the hypothesis by Yale paleontologist John Ostrom that hadrosaurs fed on conifers. The map also shows numerous isolated tracks due in part to the removal of some tracks by the miners or to the differential firmness of the swamp floor. Firmer mud, such as late in the dry season or during prolonged droughts, would not leave deep tracks; in support of this, mud cracks are known from the mines, as is charcoal from fires (called fusain). The hadrosaur tracks from the Blackhawk Formation also contain some of the smallest known tracks. Assuming that the smallest ones, ~3.5 cm (1.25 in) are real and not carved, these would indicate hatchling-sized individuals around 40 cm (16 in,) long. Other, slightly larger tracks preserved on a rock slab are reliably 4 to 5 cm (1.5-2 in.) wide and made by individuals a little less than a meter long. The presence of these small tracks from coal swamp deposits are important because they indicate the presence of nearby nesting grounds, which unfortunately, have not yet been found. The full size range of tracks from the coal mines indicate individuals from 0.4 m (1.25 ft.) to 16 m (52.5 ft.) and that this species spent its entire life in the swamps.

Unfortunately, because of the use of long-wall mining now, which is less wasteful than the old room-and-pillar method, the recovery of dinosaur tracks and bones from mines in the Blackhawk Formation, has all but dried-up.

== Paleobiota ==
=== Flora ===
Charophyta

Chlorophyceae

Pediastrum sp.

Sphenopsida

Equisetum sp.

Pteropsida

Allantodiopsis erosa

Cyathea pinnata

Onoclea hebridica

Osmunda hollicki

Saccoloma gardneri

Cycadophyta

Nageiopsis sp. Podozamites sp.

Coniferophyta

Androvettia sp.

Araucarites sp.

Brachyphyllum squammnosum

Geinitzia reichenbachii

Metasequoia sp.

Moriconia cyclotoxon

Protophyllocladus polymorpha

Protophyllocladus sp.

Sequoia cuneata

Taxoidioxylon sp.

Widdringtonites reichii

Magnoliophyta

Annona robusta

Apocynophyllum giganteum

Cercidiphyllum arcticum

"Cissus" marginata

"Cornus" praeimpressa

Cyperacites sp.

Dryophyllum sp.

Dryophyllum subfalcatum

"Ficus" laurophylla

"Ficus" planicostata

Phoenocites imperialis

Laurophyllum coloradensis

Manihotites georgiana

Menispermum dauricumoides

Myrtophyllum torreyi

Nymphaeites dawsoni

Platanus alata

Platanus raynoldsii

Rhamnites eminens

Sabalites grayanus

Trapa paulula

Salix proteaefolia

Viburnum antiguum

=== Invertebrate Trace Fossils ===
Asterosoma

Aulichnites

Chondrites

Gyrochorte

Helminthoida

Ophiomorpha

Pelecypodichnus

Teichichnus

Terebellina

Thalassinoides

=== Invertebrates ===
Anomia

Brachidontes

Corbula

Crassostrea

Ursirivus

Viviparus

=== Vertebrates ===
osteichrhyes

Lepisosteus sp. teleost

Testudines

Basilemys sp. Trionychidae

Crocodylia

Pterosauria (ichnofossil)

Theropoda (ichnofossil)

Hadrosauridae - "Dinosauropodes" (ichnofossil and bone)

Ceratopsia (ichnofossil and bone)

== Gallery ==
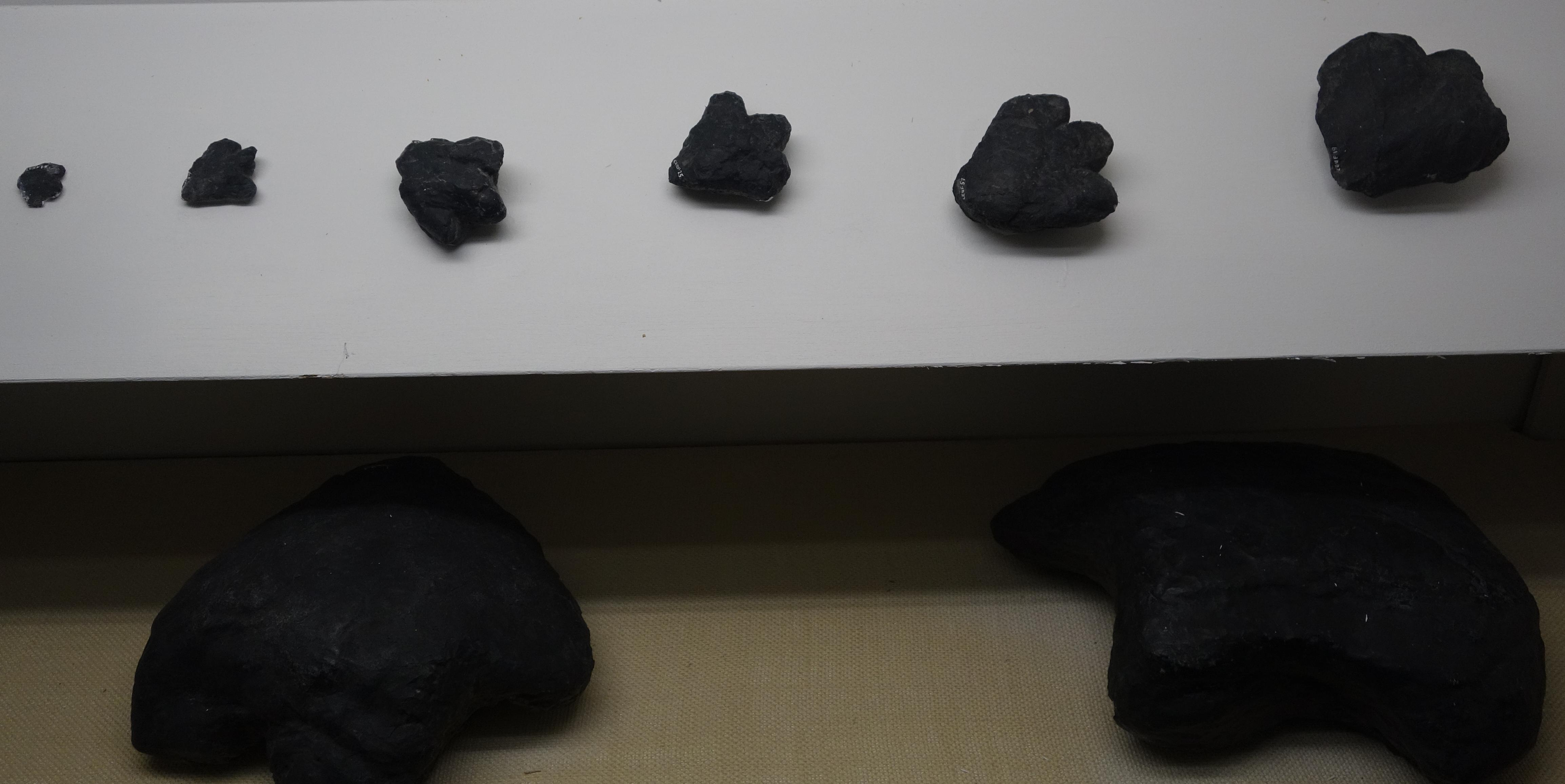
Growth series of small hadrosaur tracks, Prehistoric Museum, Price, Utah

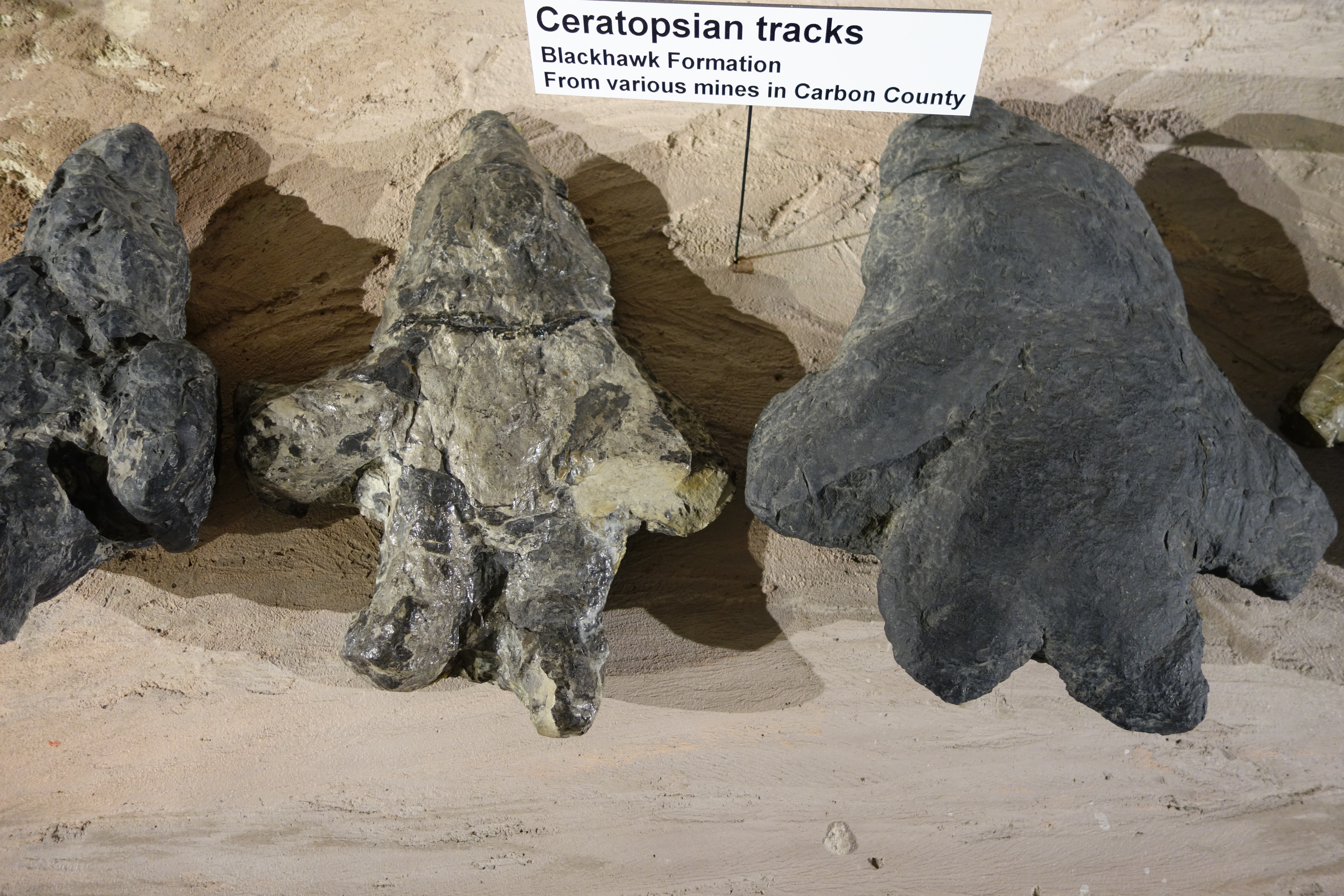
Probable ceratopsian tracks. Prehistoric Museum, Price, Utah

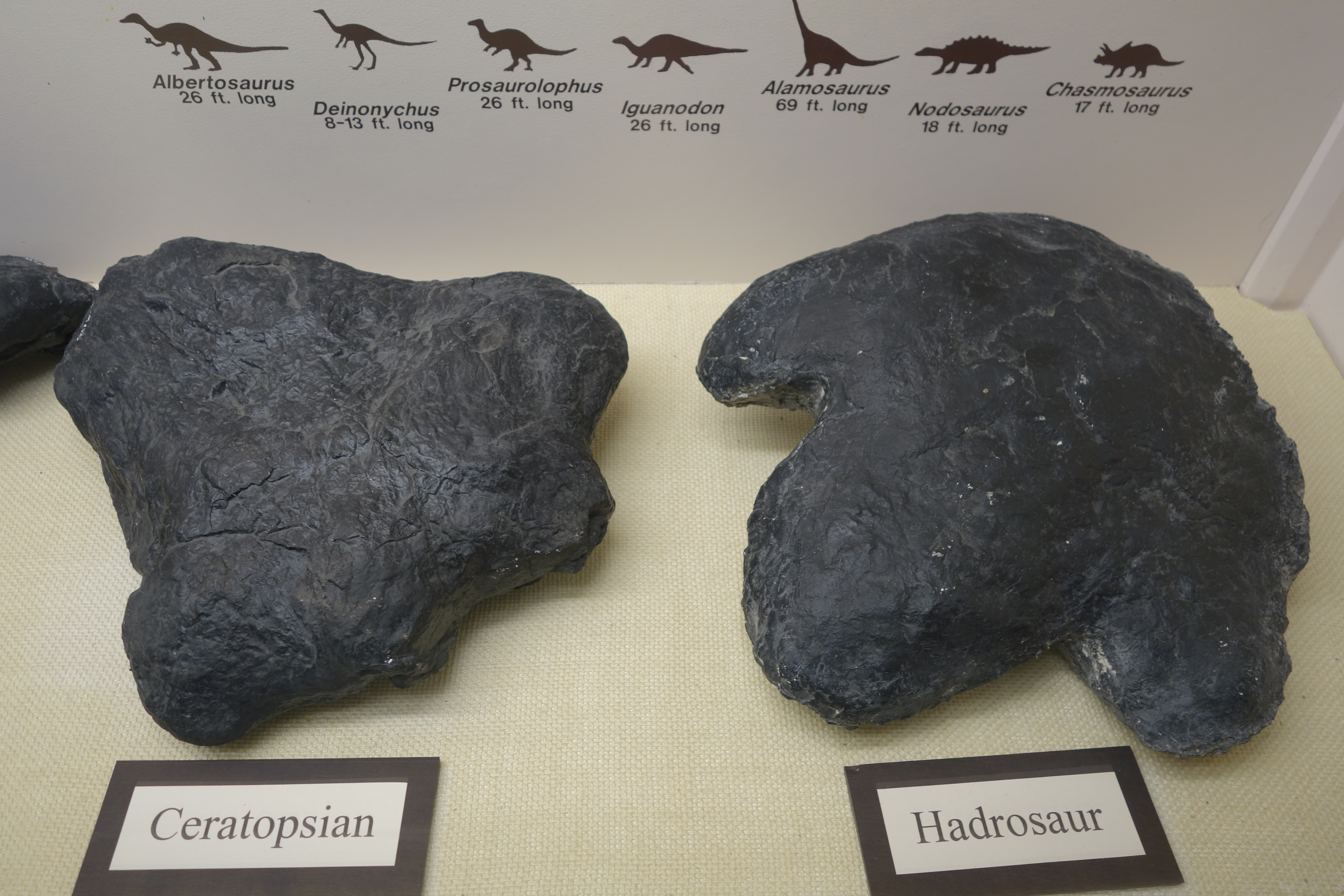
Comparison of a ceratopsian track (left) and hadrosaur track (right). Prehistoric Museum, Price, Utah.

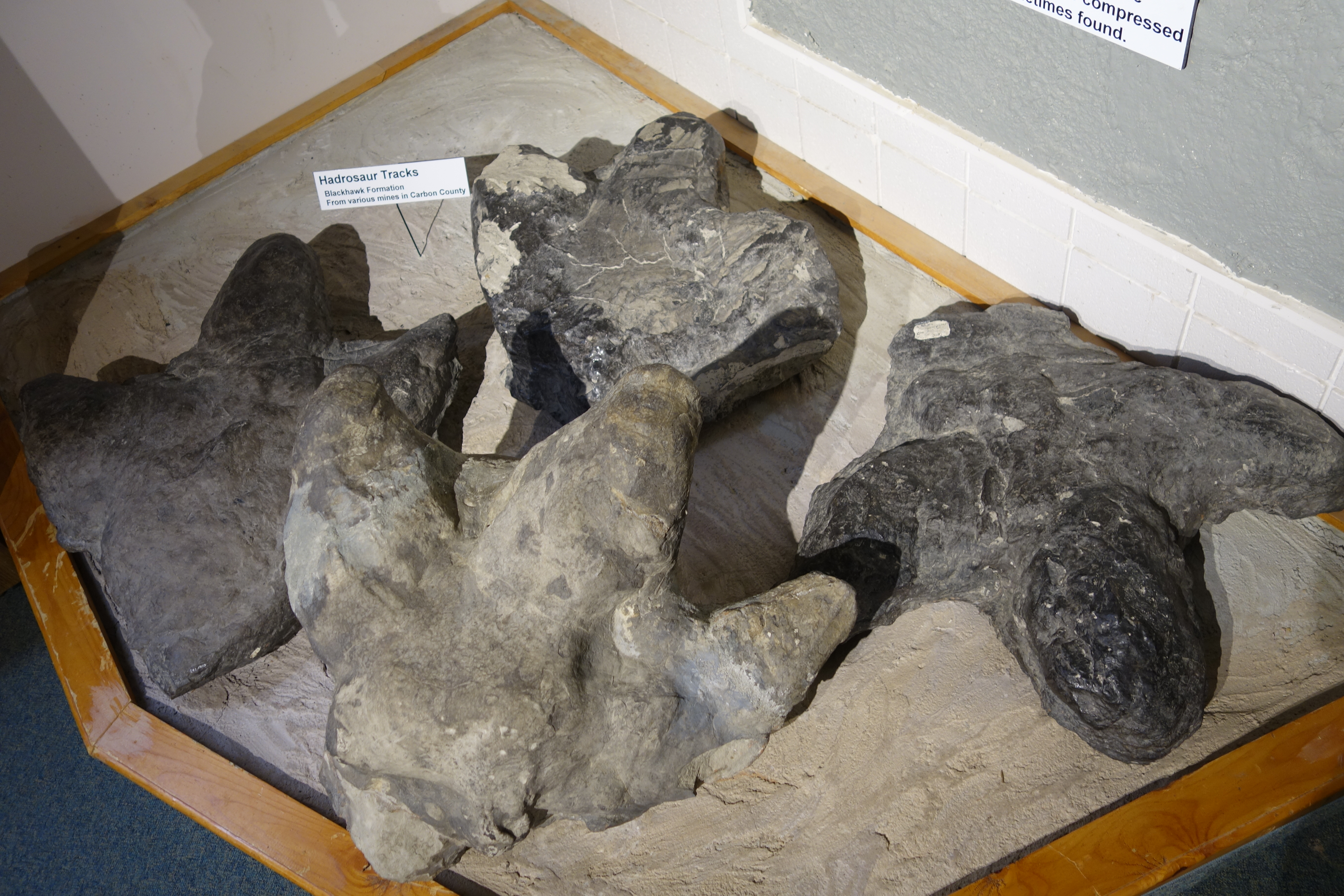
Variety of large hadrosaur tracks from coal mines, Carbon County, Utah. Prehistoric Museum, Price, Utah.

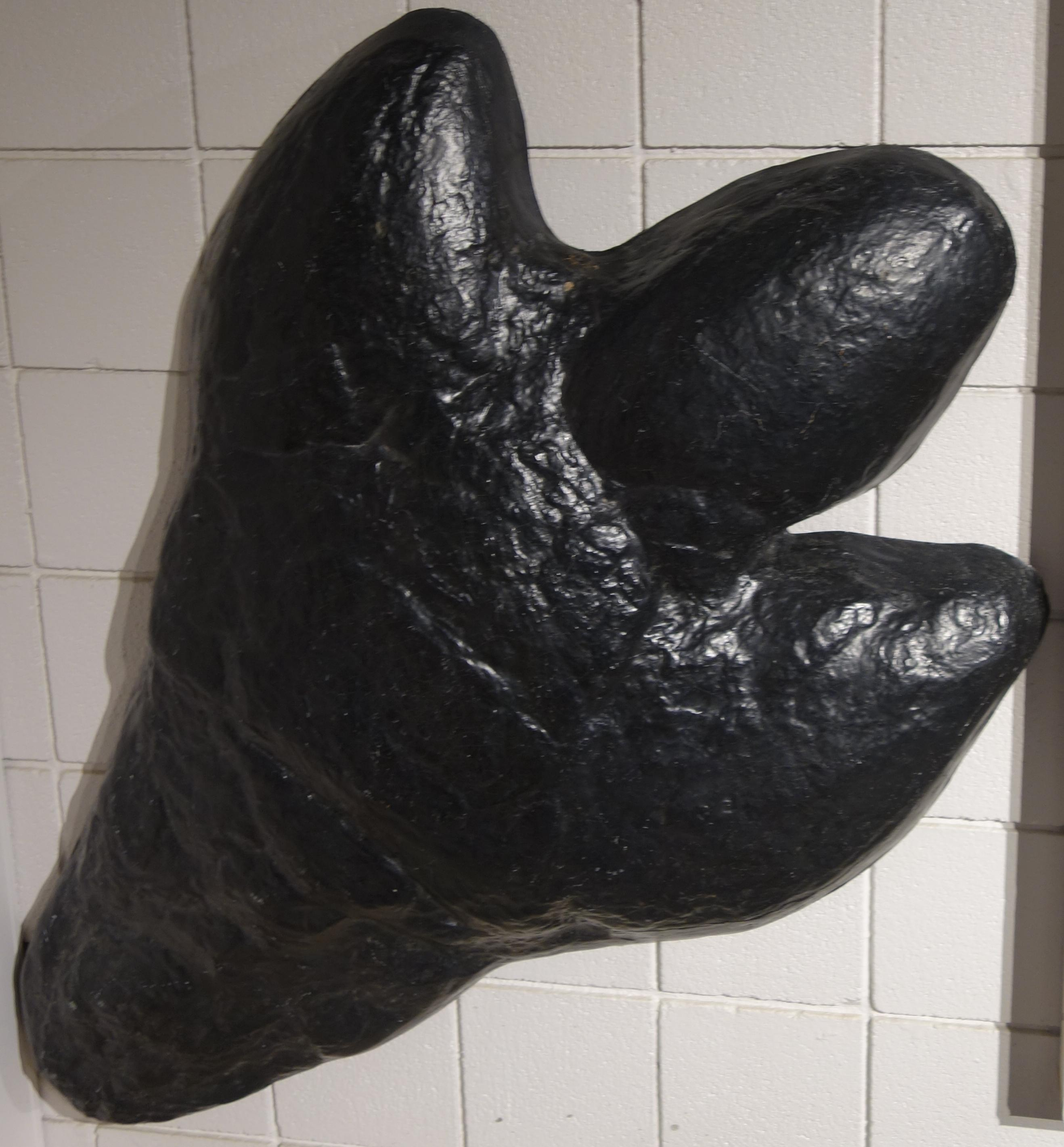
Cast of "Dinosauropodes", actually a hadrosaur track with an elongate heel from slipping on wet mud. Prehistoric Museum, Price, Utah.

== See also ==
- List of fossil sites
