= Eller Beck Formation =

Geological formation in England

- Stratigraphic range: Aalenian-Bajocian
- Type: Formation
- Unit of: Ravenscar Group
- Sub-units: Lower Member, Upper Member, Blowgill Member
- Underlies: Cloughton Formation
- Overlies: Saltwick Formation
- Thickness: Typically 4.5 to 6 m, maximum of 8.2m

Lithology
- Primary: Sandstone, Mudstone
- Other: Ironstone, Limestone

Location
- Region: Europe
- Country: United Kingdom
- Extent: Yorkshire

Type section
- Named for: Eller Beck
- Location: Walk Mill Foss

Whitby Bay cross section incl. Eller Beck Formation

The Eller Beck Formation is a geologic formation in England. It preserves fossils dating back to the Jurassic period. It consists of a lower unit less than 3 metres (9.8 ft) thick consisting of mudstone with subordinate ironstone, with an upper unit typically 4–6 metres (13–20 ft) thick consisting of fine-medium grained sandstone, further south it changes into finer grained facies with mudstone and limestone.

== See also ==
- List of fossiliferous stratigraphic units in England
