= Chandler Formation =

Geologic formation on Baffin Island, Canada

Coordinates: 67.6691°N 69.9892°W

- Stratigraphic range: Early Jurassic (Hettangian)
- Type: Geological formation
- Underlies: Bravo Lake Formation

Location
- Region: Baffin Island (Crimmins Island)
- Country: Canada

The Chandler Formation is a Mesozoic geologic formation in Canada. Dinosaur remains are among the fossils that have been recovered from the formation, although none have yet been referred to a specific genus.

== Vertebrate fauna ==
=== Crinoidea ===
Color key: Taxon / Reclassified taxon / Taxon falsely reported as present / Dubious taxon or junior synonym / Ichnotaxon / Ootaxon / Morphotaxon	Notes; Uncertain or tentative taxa are in small text; ~~crossed out~~ taxa are discredited.

Crinoidea of the Chandler Formation
Genus	Species	Location	Stratigraphic position	Material	Notes	Images
Pentacrinites	P. dargniesi		Middle	"Some indeterminate Fossils."		Pentacrinites

=== Bony Fish ===
Color key: Taxon / Reclassified taxon / Taxon falsely reported as present / Dubious taxon or junior synonym / Ichnotaxon / Ootaxon / Morphotaxon	Notes; Uncertain or tentative taxa are in small text; ~~crossed out~~ taxa are discredited.

Ray-finned fish of the Chandler Formation
Genus	Species	Location	Stratigraphic position	Material	Notes	Images
Prolepidotus	P. sacidus		Middle	"Partal Skeleton."	The antecessor of Lepidotus	
Thoracopterus	T. magnificus		Middle	"Scales and skull bones."		Thoracopterus

=== Synapsids ===
Synapsids of the Chandler Formation
Genus	Species	Location	Stratigraphic position	Material	Notes	Images
Arnognathus	A. parvidens				A cynodont.	

=== Dinosaurs ===
Color key: Taxon / Reclassified taxon / Taxon falsely reported as present / Dubious taxon or junior synonym / Ichnotaxon / Ootaxon / Morphotaxon	Notes; Uncertain or tentative taxa are in small text; ~~crossed out~~ taxa are discredited.

Dinosaurs of the Chandler Formation
Genus	Species	Location	Stratigraphic position	Material	Notes	Images
Megalosauridae	Indeterminate		Middle	"Tibia."	Actually indeterminate ceratosaur remains.	

== See also ==
- List of volcanoes in Canada
- Volcanism of Canada
- Volcanism of Northern Canada
- Geography of Nunavut
- List of dinosaur-bearing rock formations
  - List of stratigraphic units with indeterminate dinosaur fossils
