= Gormire Lake =

Lake in North Yorkshire, England

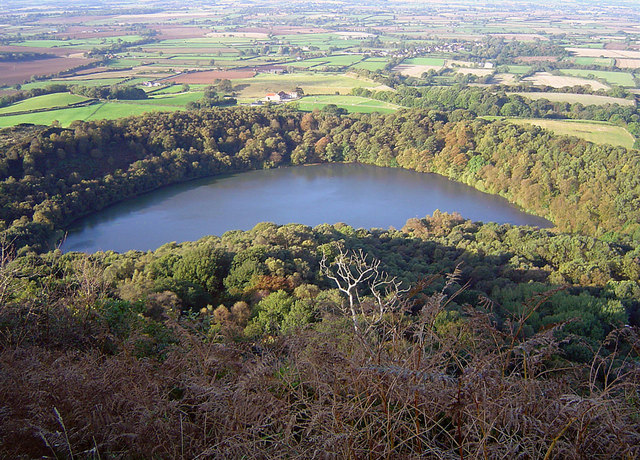
- Gormire Lake, taken from Whitestone Cliff looking west across the Vale of York.

- Location within North Yorkshire
- Coordinates: 54°14′31.3″N 1°13′47.4″W
- Type: Lake
- Primary inflows: None
- Primary outflows: None
- Catchment area: 74.7 acres (30.25 ha)
- Basin countries: England
- Surface area: 15 acres (6 ha)
- Max. depth: 18 feet (5.5 m)
- Shore length^{1}: 0.6 miles (0.97 km)
- Surface elevation: 509 feet (155 m)
- ^{1} Shore length is not a well-defined measure.

Gormire Lake is a natural lowland lake that lies at the foot of Whitestone Cliff, a western escarpment of the Hambleton Hills in the North York Moors National Park. The lake is 1.2 miles (2 km) east of the village of Sutton-under-Whitestonecliffe in North Yorkshire, England. Gormire has no inflow or major outflow of water. It is thought to be fed by an underground spring and drained by a limestone channel so the water finds a way out through the base of the cliff face to the east of the lake. The lake is also known as the White Mere, Lake Gormire, or more simply, Gormire. The name Gormire translates as filthy swamp.

The lake was formed over 20,000 years ago by glacial erosion. When an ice sheet pushed its way between the Pennines and the North York Moors, it bulldozed the soft earth away and carved the cliffs at Whitestone and in turn the mud left over stopped the water's egress and formed the glacial lake. Gormire Lake was a result of this process and is fourth largest of the natural lakes in Yorkshire (the other three being Hornsea Mere, Malham Tarn and Semerwater). The lake was first designated as an Site of Special Scientific Interest (SSSI) in 1954; however, in 1985 the area surrounding the lake was incorporated into the SSSI status with the new area being 133.5 acres (54.03 ha). The new designation incorporates the broadleaf woodlands of Garbutt Wood which encroach right up to the water's edge.

The lake is the setting of several myths; one being of a knight known as Sir Harry Scriven who conned the Abbot of Rievaulx Abbey into letting him ride his horse (a white mare, the so-called derivation of White Mare Cliff (another name for Whitestonecliff)). The knight and the abbot rode on from an inn and as they did so, it turned into a race. The abbot then changed into the devil, which caused such panic in the knight that he couldn't stop the horse and himself plunging into Gormire Lake from the clifftop. The 'devil' was then seen to jump into the lake after them and the boiling effect of the devil in the water is what is said to have caused the darkness of the lake to this day.

Other myths are that the lake is bottomless, that the bottom of the lake is the entrance to hell, there is submerged village underneath the water and that a goose once disappeared in the lake to emerge in a well at Kirkbymoorside stripped of all its feathers.

Gormire Lake is popular with wild swimmers as it has no streams feeding it so there is very little current and the waters are described as being 'warm'. Swimmers have reported that it is seething with leeches. The Times named the lake as one of the 20 best lakes and rivers in Britain for wild swimming.
