= Scalby Formation =

Geological formation in England

- Stratigraphic range: Bathonian
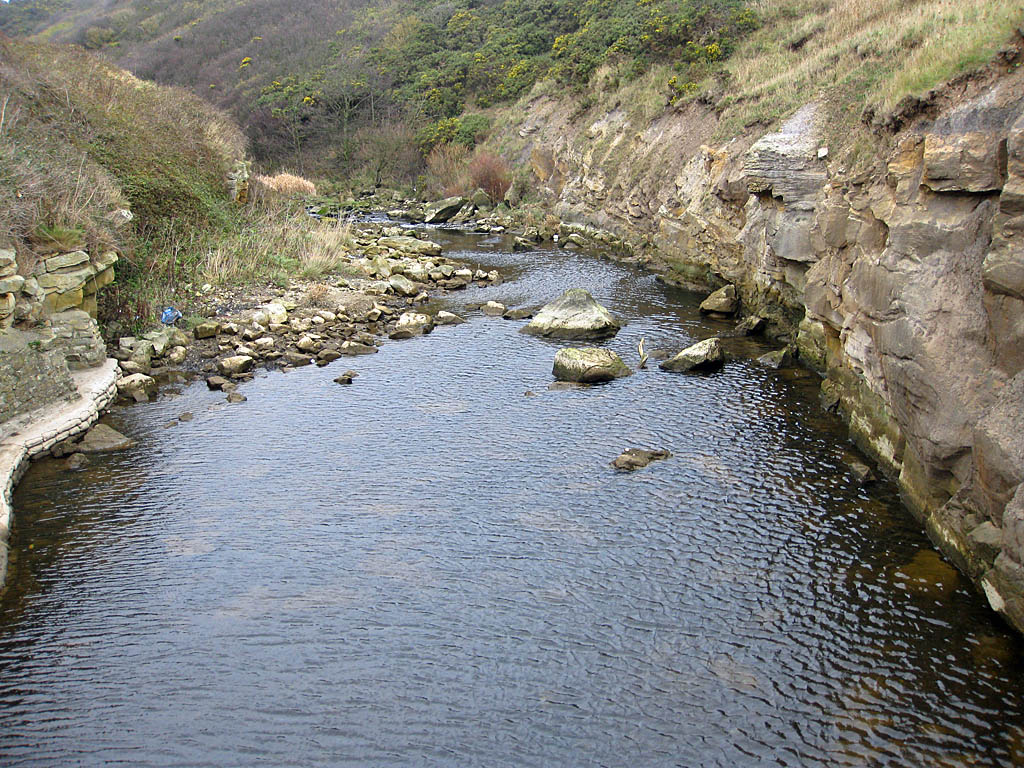
- exposure of the Scalby Formation near Scalby, North Yorkshire
- Type: Geological formation
- Unit of: Ravenscar Group
- Sub-units: Moor Grit Member, Long Nab Member
- Underlies: Cornbrash Formation, Osgodby Formation
- Overlies: Scarborough Formation
- Thickness: up to 60 metres (200 ft)

Lithology
- Primary: Moor Grit Member - Sandstone; Long Nab Member - Mudstone, Siltstone
- Other: Moor Grit Member - Mudstone, Siltstone; Long Nab Member - Sandstone

Location
- Region: Europe
- Country: United Kingdom
- Extent: North Yorkshire

Type section
- Named for: Scalby, North Yorkshire
- Location: Scalby Cliff

The Scalby Formation is a geological formation in England. Part of the Ravenscar Group, it was deposited in the Bathonian stage of the Middle Jurassic. The lower Moor Grit Member has a lithology consisting of medium to coarse grained cross bedded sandstone, with thin beds of mudstone and siltstone, while the upper Long Nab Member has a lithology consisting of predominantly laminated mudstone and siltstone, with fine to medium grained planar and cross stratified sandstones. The formation is thought to have accumulated on a floodplain, with a seasonally dry climate.

Fossilized dinosaur tracks have been found in the Scalby Formation; these include a recently discovered footprint from a large theropod, probably a megalosaurid. The track is from the Long Nab Member, and has been assigned to the ichnogenus Megalosauripus.

Like other members of the Ravenscar Group, the formation is well known for its plant fossils (including pollen), which consist of Ginkgoales (including the living genus Ginkgo), Czekanowskiales, bennettitaleans, cheirolepidacean and araucarian conifers, ferns, lycophytes, and seed ferns including Caytoniales.
