= Cleveland Basin =

Sedimentary basin in England

The Cleveland Basin is a sedimentary basin in Yorkshire, England. Formed initially by rifting during the Mississippian period of the Early Carboniferous. It is West–East trending and lies between the intrabasinal highs of the Askrigg Block and the Market Weighton Axis, passing eastwards offshore into the Sole Pit Basin. It contains a thick development of the Bowland Shale, which has been assessed as being a major potential source of shale gas. It was inverted towards the end of the Carboniferous and most of the Upper Carboniferous sequence was eroded off. Subsequent deposition has also created a thick fill of Jurassic and Cretaceous sediments.
