= List of stratigraphic units with sauropodomorph tracks =

== Prosauropods ==
Name	Age	Location	Description
Aganane Formation	Pliensbachian	Morocco	Up to 1350 tracks, most of them currently undescribed. Includes the largest Otozoum described in literature.
Calcari Grigi di Noriglio Formation		Italy	Description
Dolomia Principale Formation		Italy	Description
Durrestein Formation		Italy	Description
McCoy Brook Formation		Canada	Description
Moenave Formation		USA	Description
Montemarcello Formation		Italy	Description
Portezuelo Formation	Carnian	Argentina	Description
Portland Formation	Pliensbachian to Toarcian	USA	Description
Redonda Formation		USA	Description
Rock Point Formation		USA	Description
Rotzo Formation	Pliensbachian	Italy	Description
Sheep Pen Sandstone Formation		USA	Description
Sloan Canyon Formation		USA	Description

== Sauropods ==
Name	Age	Location	Description
Aganane Formation	Pliensbachian	Morocco	Up to 1350 tracks, most of them currently undescribed. Includes several new Sauropod morphotypes.
Alacón Formation		Spain	Description
Antenor Navarro Formation		Brazil	Description
Antlers Formation	Late Aptian to Middle Albian	USA	Description
Aréen Formation		Spain	Description
Azóia Limestone		Portugal	Description
Bhuj Formation		India	Description
Broome Sandstone		Australia	Description
Castellar Formation		Spain	Description
Calcare di Altamura Formation		Italy	Description
Calcare di Cellina Formation		Italy	Description
Calcari Grigi di Noriglio Formation		Italy	Description
Calcarios Micriticos da Serra de Aire		Portugal	Description
Cedar Mountain Formation	Barremian to basal Cenomanian	USA	Description
Chacarilla Formation		Chile	Description
Chaunaca Formation		Bolivia	Description
Corda Formation		Brazil	Description
DeQueen Formation		USA	Description
Edwards Formation		USA	Description
Encisco Group		Spain	Description
Glen Rose Formation	Late Aptian to Early Albian	USA	Description
Gres d'Assaouas Formation		Niger	Description
Haman Formation		South Korea	Description
Hasandong Formation		South Korea	Description
Higuerueles Formation		Spain	Description
Iouaridene Formation		Morocco	Description
Jindong Formation		South Korea	Description
Katrol Formation		India	Description
Kcskehát Limestone Formation		Hungary	Description
Kem Kem Beds		Morocco	Description
Kitadani Formation	Aptian to Albian	Japan	Description
Kurek Svita Formation		Uzbekistan	Description
Lastres Formation		Spain	Description
Luchak Svita Formation		Tajikistan	Description
Monte Grande Formation		Spain	Description
Morrison Formation	Time	USA	Description
Nemegt Formation	Early Maastrichtian	Mongolia	- has a few alternate spellings
Oncala Group		Spain	Description
Patuxent Formation		USA	Description
Phra Wihan Formation		Thailand	Description
Purbeck Beds	Berriasian	UK	Description
Reuchenette Formation		Switzerland	Description
Rio Limay Formation		Argentina	Description
Rupelo Formation		Spain	Description
Sagog Formation		South Korea	Description
Saltwick Formation		UK	Description
Samana Suk Limestone		Pakistan	
Shirabad Svita		Tajikistan	Description
Sousa Formation		Brazil	Description
Tecocoyunca Group		Mexico	Description
Terenes Formation		Spain	Description
Tizi-n-Aït tracksite		Morocco	Tracks attributed to sauropods or stegosaurs, and an unidentified carnosaur
Tremp Formation		Spain	Sauropod and hadrosaur tracks and sauropod in situ nesting sites, designated UNESCO Global Geopark in 2018
Uhangri Formation		South Korea	Description
Vega Formation		Spain	Description
Villar del Arzobispo Formation		Spain	Description
Wagad Formation		India	Description
White Limestone Formation		UK	Description
Winton Formation	Cenomanian	Australia	
Zorillo Formation		Mexico	Description

== See also ==
List of dinosaur-bearing rock formations
