= Bhuj Formation =

Geologic formation in India

- Stratigraphic range: Tithonian–Aptian
- Type: Geological formation
- Sub-units: Umia, Ghuneri & Ukra members
- Underlies: N/A
- Overlies: Katrol Formation

Lithology
- Primary: Sandstone

Location
- Coordinates: 23.7°N 69.0°E
- Approximate paleocoordinates: 30.3°S 33.8°E
- Region: Gujarat, Kutch
- Country: India
- Bhuj Formation (India)

The Bhuj Formation is a Cretaceous (Valanginian to Santonian) geologic formation in India. Fossil sauropod tracks and tracks from the ichnogenera Skolithos, Diplocraterion, Pholeus and Planolites have been reported from the formation.

== Geology ==
See 1819 Rann of Kutch earthquake.

== Paleobiota ==
Color key: Taxon / Reclassified taxon / Taxon falsely reported as present / Dubious taxon or junior synonym / Ichnotaxon / Ootaxon / Morphotaxon	Notes; Uncertain or tentative taxa are in small text; ~~crossed out~~ taxa are discredited.

=== Sauropterygia ===
Sauropterygians from the Bhuj Formation
Genus	Species	Material	Time period	Notes	Images
Simolestes	S. indicus	Symphysis of the mandible, about 3.55 inches long	Late Jurassic	Originally referred to as Plesiosaurus indicus. Might not belong to Simolestes.	

=== Mollusca ===
Molluscas from the Bhuj Formation
Genus	Species	Material	Notes
Umiaites	sp.		
Virgatosphinctes	sp.		
Aulacosphinctes	sp		
Tropaeum	T. australis		
Opisthotrigonia	O. retrorsa		
Indotrigonia	I. beyschlagi		
Pterotrigonia	P. umiensis		
Pterotrigonia	P. kitchinin		
Pterotrigonia	P. ventricosa		
Pterotrigonia	P. ghuneriensis		
Pterotrigonia	P. sp.		
Gervillella	G. anceps		
Megatrigonia	sp.		
Cheloniceras	C. martini		
Astarte	A. major		
Aulacosphinctes	sp.		
Micracanthoceras	sp.		
Tithopeltoceras	T. lakhaparensis		
Opisthotrigonia	O. retrorsa		
Megacucullaea	M. eminens		
Pleurotomaria	P. umiensis		
Bathrotomaria	B. brihattama		
Chlamys	C. moondanensis		
Gryphaea	sp.		
Lithophaga	sp.		
Opisthotrigonia	O. spissicostata		
Iotrigonia	I. vscripta		
Iotrigonia	I. recurva		
Steinmanella	S. mamillata		
Astarte?	A. venkatappayyi		
Deshayesites	D. deshayesi		
Laevitrigonia	L. cardiniiformis		

== See also ==
- List of dinosaur-bearing rock formations
  - List of stratigraphic units with sauropodomorph tracks
    - Sauropod tracks
