= Tereñes Formation =

Late Jurassic geologic formation in Spain

- Stratigraphic range: Kimmeridgian; ~155–151 Ma
- Type: Geological formation
- Underlies: Lastres Formation
- Overlies: Vega Formation
- Thickness: 400 metres

Lithology
- Primary: Marl
- Other: Sandstone

Location
- Coordinates: 43.5°N 5.2°W
- Approximate paleocoordinates: 35.6°N 7.0°E
- Region: Asturias
- Country: Spain
- Tereñes Formation (Spain) Tereñes Formation (Asturias)

The Tereñes Formation or Tereñes Marl is a Late Jurassic (Kimmeridgian) geologic formation in Asturias, Spain. The grey marls of the formation were deposited in a lagoonal environment at a muddy coast along a temporary inland sea. The lower section of the formation comprises silty and chalky sandstones with desiccation cracks and ripple marks, then becomes a bituminous, prominently ostracod-bearing, pelecypod shell chalk, lime chalk marl and marl. Fossil tracks have been reported from the formation. The Terenes and Lastres Formations are regarded as lateral equivalents.

== Fossil content ==
The following fossils were reported from the formation:

Dinosaurs

- Theropoda indet.
- ?Allosauroidea indet.
- Neosauropoda indet.
- Ankylopollexia indet.

Crocodylimorphs

- Dakosaurus sp.
- cf. Machimosaurus sp.

Ichnofossils

- Gigantosauropus asturiensis
- Hispanosauropus hauboldi

== See also ==
- List of dinosaur-bearing rock formations
  - List of stratigraphic units with sauropodomorph tracks
    - Sauropod tracks
