= Katrol Formation =

Geologic formation in India

- Stratigraphic range: Kimmeridgian-Tithonian; ~150–145 Ma
- Type: Geological formation
- Underlies: Bhuj Formation
- Overlies: Wagad Formation
- Area: Kutch

Location
- Coordinates: 23.5°N 70.5°E
- Approximate paleocoordinates: 27.4°S 33.3°E
- Region: Gujarat
- Country: India
- Katrol Formation (India)

The Katrol Formation is a Mesozoic geologic formation in India. Fossil Dinosaur tracks have been reported from the formation. An indeterminate ophthalmosaurid ichthyosaur is also known from the formation in the Kutch district.

== Paleobiota ==
=== Dinosaurs ===
Sauropods of the Katrol Formation
Genus	Species	Material	Notes	Photos
Sauropoda	Indeterminate	Footprints	A Sauropod.	

=== Theropods ===
Theropods of the Katrol Formation
Genus	Species	Material	Notes	Photos
Megalosauridae?	Indeterminate	Footprints and vertebrae.	Originally described as an Allosauroid.	

=== Ornithischian ===
Ornithischians of the Katrol Formation
Genus	Species	Material	Notes	Photos
Ornithopoda?	Indeterminate	Footprints	An Ornithopod	

=== Sauropterygians ===
Sauropterygians of the Katrol Formation
Genus	Species	Material	Notes	Photos
Cryptoclididae	Indeterminate	BHU No. 11701, Nineteen connected cervical vertebrae about 1 metre long.	A Plesiosaur.	

=== Ichthyosaurs ===
Ichthyosaurs of the Katrol Formation
Genus	Species	Material	Notes	Photos
Ophthalmosauridae	Indeterminate	Articulated partial skeleton.	An Ophthalmosaurid Ichthyosaur, estimated to be 5 to 5.5 metres long.	

=== Mollusca ===
Molluscs of the Katrol Formation
Genus	Species	Material	Notes
Palaeonucula	P. cuneiformis		A Nut Clam.
Palaeonucula	P. stoliczkai		A Nut Clam.
Trigonia	Sp.		A Clam.
Nuculoma	N. wynnei		A Nut Clam
Belemnoidea	Indeterminate		A Belemnitida Cephalopod.
Streblites	S. plicodiscus		A Oppeliidae ammonite.
Oppelia	O. plana		A Oppeliidae ammonite.
Oppelia	O. kachhensis		A Oppeliidae ammonite.
Aspidoceras	A. binodiferum		A Aspidoceratidae ammonite.
Aspidoceras	A. iphiceroides		A Aspidoceratidae ammonite.
Aspidoceras	A. monacanthum		A Aspidoceratidae ammonite.
Taramelliceras	T. trachinotum		A Oppeliidae ammonite.
Haploceras	H. deplanatum		A Haploceratidae ammonite.
Haploceras	H. propinquum		A Haploceratidae ammonite.
Pachysphinctes	P. bathyplocus		A Perisphinctidae ammonite.
Perisphinctes	P. pottingeri		A Perisphinctidae ammonite.
Perisphinctes	P. torquatus		A Perisphinctidae ammonite.
Perisphinctes	P. katrolensis		A Perisphinctidae ammonite.
Perisphinctes	P. sparsiplicatus		A Perisphinctidae ammonite.
Perisphinctes	P. alterneplicatus		A Perisphinctidae ammonite.
Perisphinctes	P. euplocus		A Perisphinctidae ammonite.
Harpoceras	H. kobelli		A Hildoceratidae ammonite.

=== Insecta ===
Insects of the Katrol Formation
Genus	Species	Material	Notes
Cycloserpula	sp.		A Millipede.

== See also ==
- List of dinosaur-bearing rock formations
  - List of stratigraphic units with sauropodomorph tracks
    - Sauropod tracks
  - List of stratigraphic units with ornithischian tracks
- List of plesiosaur-bearing stratigraphic units
