= Copper Ridge dinosaur tracksite =

Fossil locality in Utah, US

Copper Ridge Dinosaur Tracks Interpretive Site
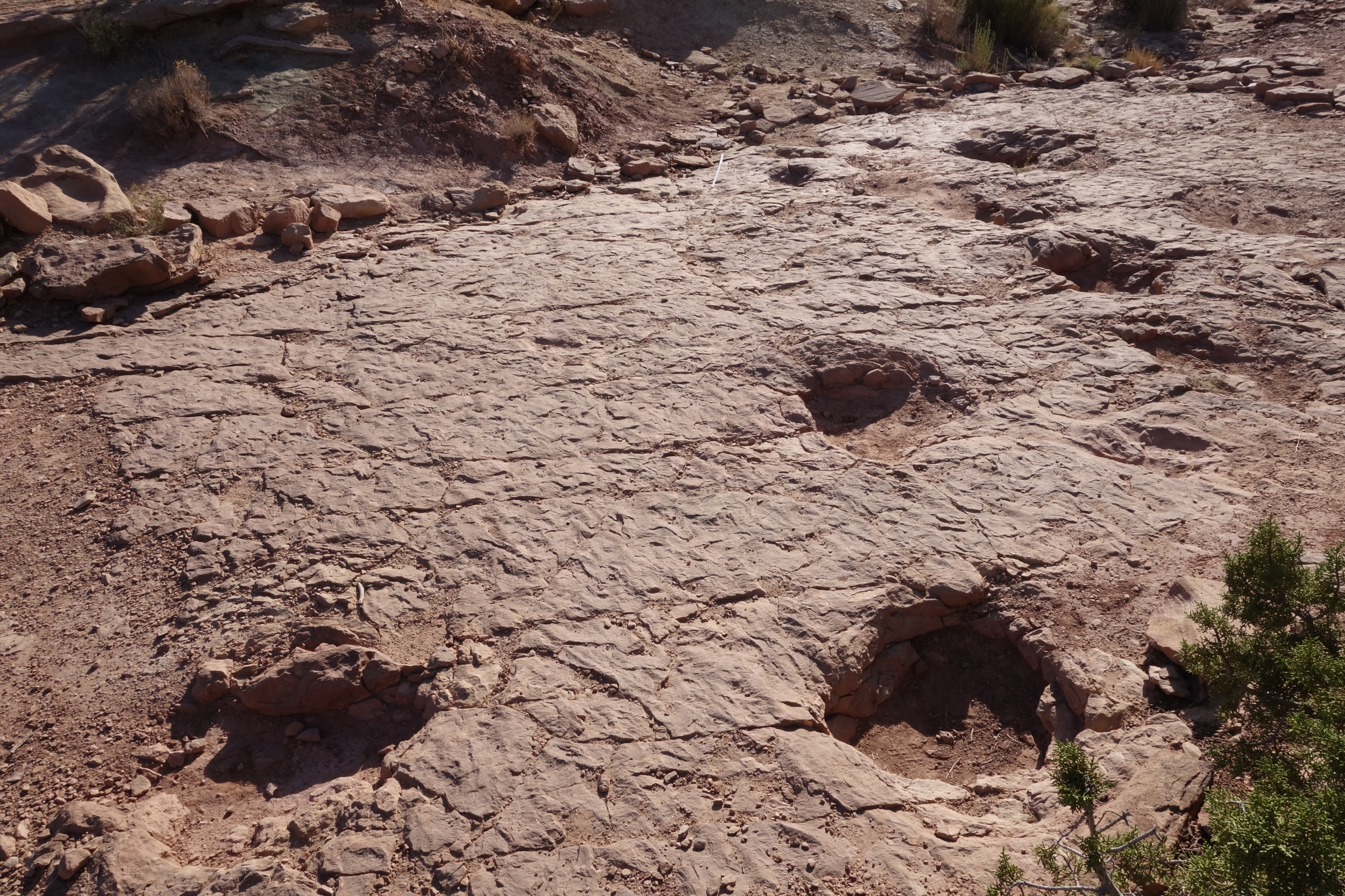
- The turning sauropod trackway at Copper Ridge
- Interactive map of Copper Ridge Dinosaur Tracks Interpretive Site
- Location: Grand County, Utah, US
- Nearest city: Moab
- Coordinates: 38°49′54″N 109°45′43″W
- Governing body: Bureau of Land Management
- Website: www.blm.gov/visit/copper-ridge-dinosaur-tracks-interpretive-site

The Copper Ridge dinosaur tracksite in Grand County, eastern Utah, US, preserves fossil tracks of dinosaurs from the Late Jurassic. It includes trackways of one sauropod, three medium-sized theropods, and one large theropod. The tracksite is part of the Morrison Formation, one of the most important dinosaur-bearing deposits in North America, and probably dates to the Kimmeridgian age, which lasted 155 to 149 million years ago. Notable features include a sharp right turn of the sauropod trackway and alternating long and short steps of the large theropod trackway. The long and short steps have been interpreted as evidence that the trackmaker might have been limping due to an injured left foot. The tracksite was discovered in 1989 and is accessible to the public as an interpretive site.

== Discovery and locality ==
The Copper Ridge tracksite is located on public land north of the city of Moab, between highway US 191 and the northern part of Arches National Park. The tracks were discovered in 1989 by Linda-Dale Jennings-Lockley; it was the first discovery of sauropod tracks in Utah. The site was first mentioned in the literature in a 1991 popular book by Martin Lockley. In 1995, Lockley briefly described the site under the name "Valley City tracksite". Soon after its discovery, the tracksite became a local attraction and interpretive signs have been installed. The site is accessible via a dirt road.

The rocks that preserve the tracks are sandstones that had been deposited in a river channel. The surface with the tracks also contains ripple marks, which were formed by water action. The rocks belong to the Salt Wash Member of the Morrison Formation. In the region, the Salt Wash Member is 40 to 91 m (131 to 299 ft) in thickness; the tracksite is located approximately 4 m (13 ft) below the top of the member. The site is probably Kimmeridgian in age.

== Description and interpretation ==
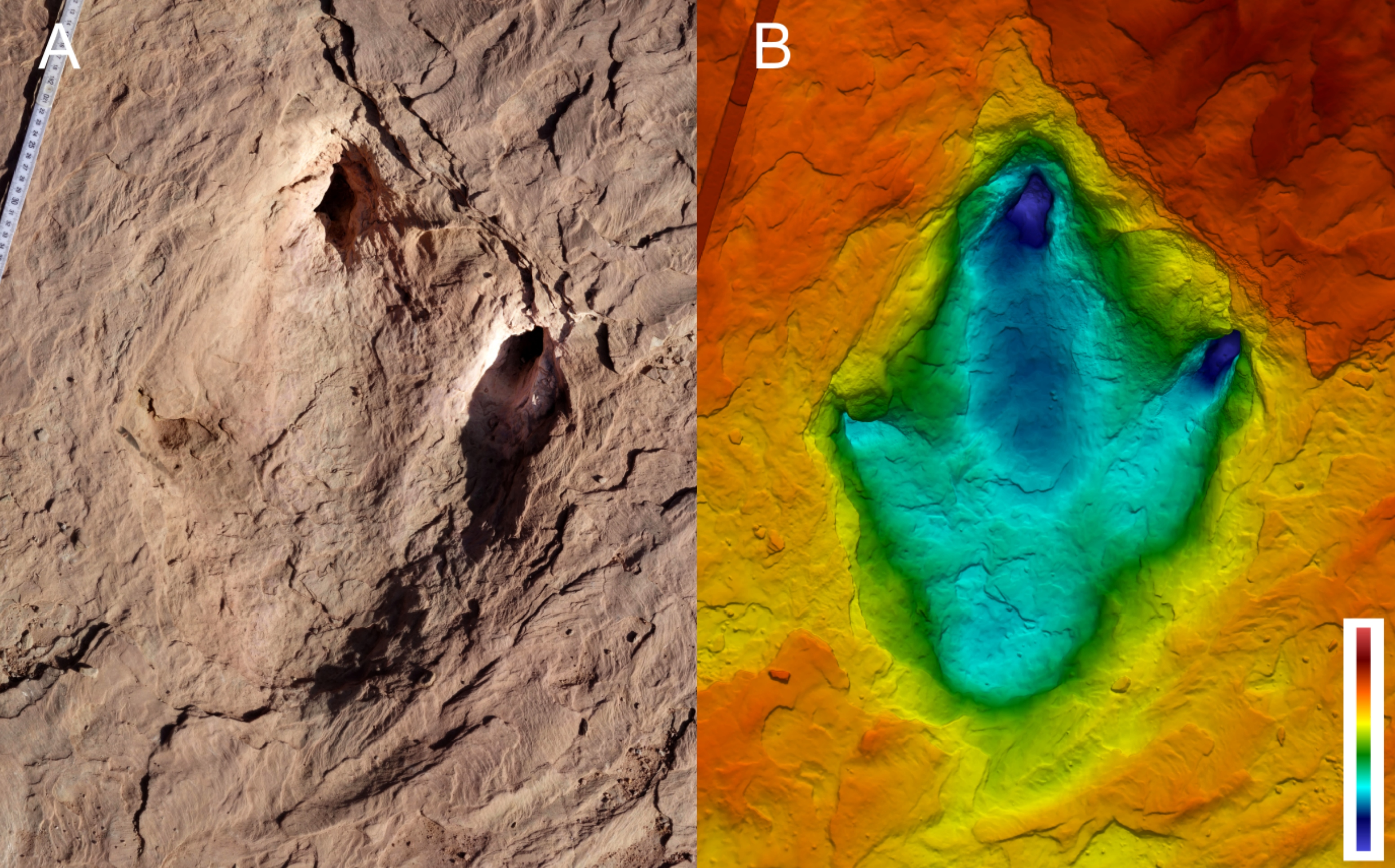
First track of the large, possibly limping theropod trackway (textured 3D model and elevation map)

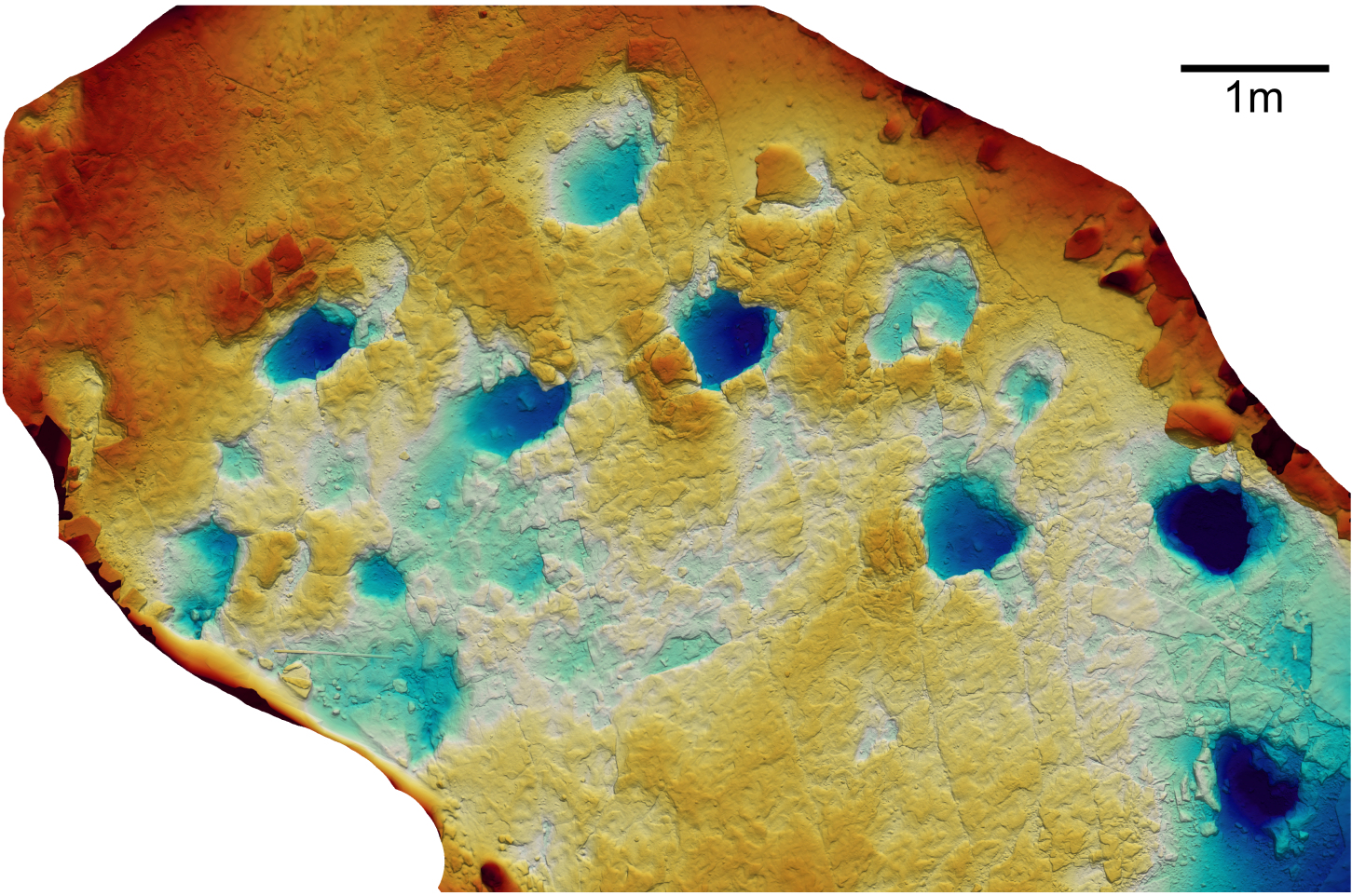
Elevation map of the turning sauropod trackway

The site preserves four theropod and one sauropod trackway. The sauropod trackway preserves both pes (hindfoot) and manus (forefoot) tracks; the pes tracks measure approximately 60 cm (2 ft) in diameter. The trackmaker made a sharp right turn of ca. 65°; such turning trackways are uncommon in the fossil record. It is unknown which genus of sauropod made this trackway. However, it has been assigned to Brontopodus, an ichnogenus that is characterised by very broad ("wide-gauged") trackways in which the pes tracks do not meet the trackway midline.

The large theropod trackway comprises seven tracks, but only the first is well preserved, with well-developed claw marks at the tips of the three digit impressions. This track measures 47 cm (19 in) in length, 35 cm (14 in) in width, and 6 to 7 cm (2.4 to 2.8 in) in depth. The trackmaker is estimated at ca. 1.9 m (6 ft 3 in) tall at the hips, and its strides (the distances between two tracks made by the same foot) measure 2.82 to 2.93 m (9 ft 3 in to 9 ft 7 in). Right-to-left steps are about 28% shorter than left-to-right steps, possibly suggesting that the trackmaker was limping. Such discrepancies in step lengths may be caused by an injured foot, although other explanations such as footedness are possible as well, and the tracks are not obviously malformed. If an injured foot was the cause, the injured foot would have been the left one.

In a 2015 publication, John Foster assigned the limping theropod trackway to the ichnogenus Hispanosauropus. It differs from the ichnogenus Megalosauripus, which has been found in older strata of the Morrison Formation, in its proportionally longer middle digit impression (and, consequently, a shorter rear area of the track). Hispanosauropus has been originally described from Spain; the Copper Ridge example is the first North American trackway assigend to this ichnogenus. Foster noted that several other tracks from the Salt Wash member might be attributable to Hispanosauropus, and that Megalosauripus appears to have been common in the older members of the formation. The limping trackway would have been made by a larger theropod, possibly Allosaurus, Ceratosaurus, or Torvosaurus. Because it was the most common large theropod in the Morrison, Allosaurus is the most likely candidate.

== See also ==
- 20th century in ichnology
