= Lusitanian Basin =

Geological formation off the coast of Portugal

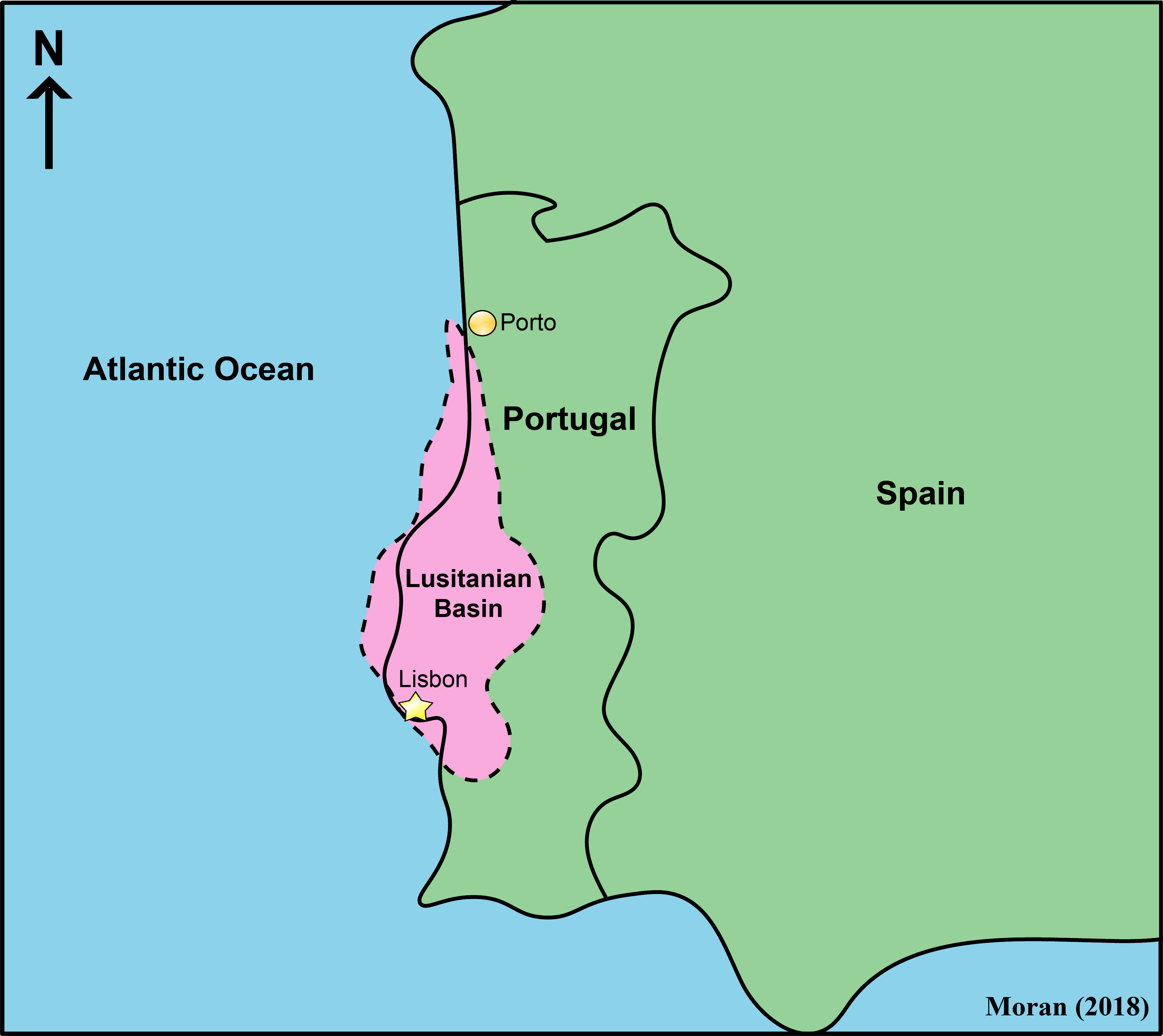
- The regional setting of the Lusitanian Basin
- Coordinates: 39°26′10″N 8°56′14″W
- Etymology: Lusitania
- Region: Iberian Peninsula
- Country: Portugal
- Cities: Lisbon, Aveiro, Leiria, Figueira da Foz

Characteristics
- On/Offshore: Both
- Part of: Iberian Mesozoic Sedimentary Basins
- Area: 22,000 km^{2} (8,500 sq mi)

Hydrology
- Sea: North Atlantic
- Lake: Lagoa de Óbidos

Geology
- Basin type: Rift
- Plate: Eurasian
- Orogeny: Opening of the North Atlantic Ocean
- Age: Late Triassic-Late Cretaceous
- Stratigraphy: Stratigraphy
- Faults: Nazaré Fault

The Lusitanian Basin is a rift basin remnant located on both the mainland and continental shelf off the west-central coast of Portugal. It covers an area measuring 20,000 square kilometres (7,700 sq mi) and extends north-south from Porto to Lisbon. The basin varies between approximately 130 kilometres (81 mi) and 340 kilometres (210 mi) in width and belongs to a family of periatlantic basins such as the Jeanne d'Arc Basin. To the east of the Lusitanian Basin lies the Central Plateau of the Iberian Peninsula. A marginal horst system lies to the west. The Alentejo and Algarve Basins connect to the southern end of the Lusitanian Basin. In the north, it connects to the Porto and Galicia Basins via an undersea ridge.

== Geologic history ==
=== Tectonics ===
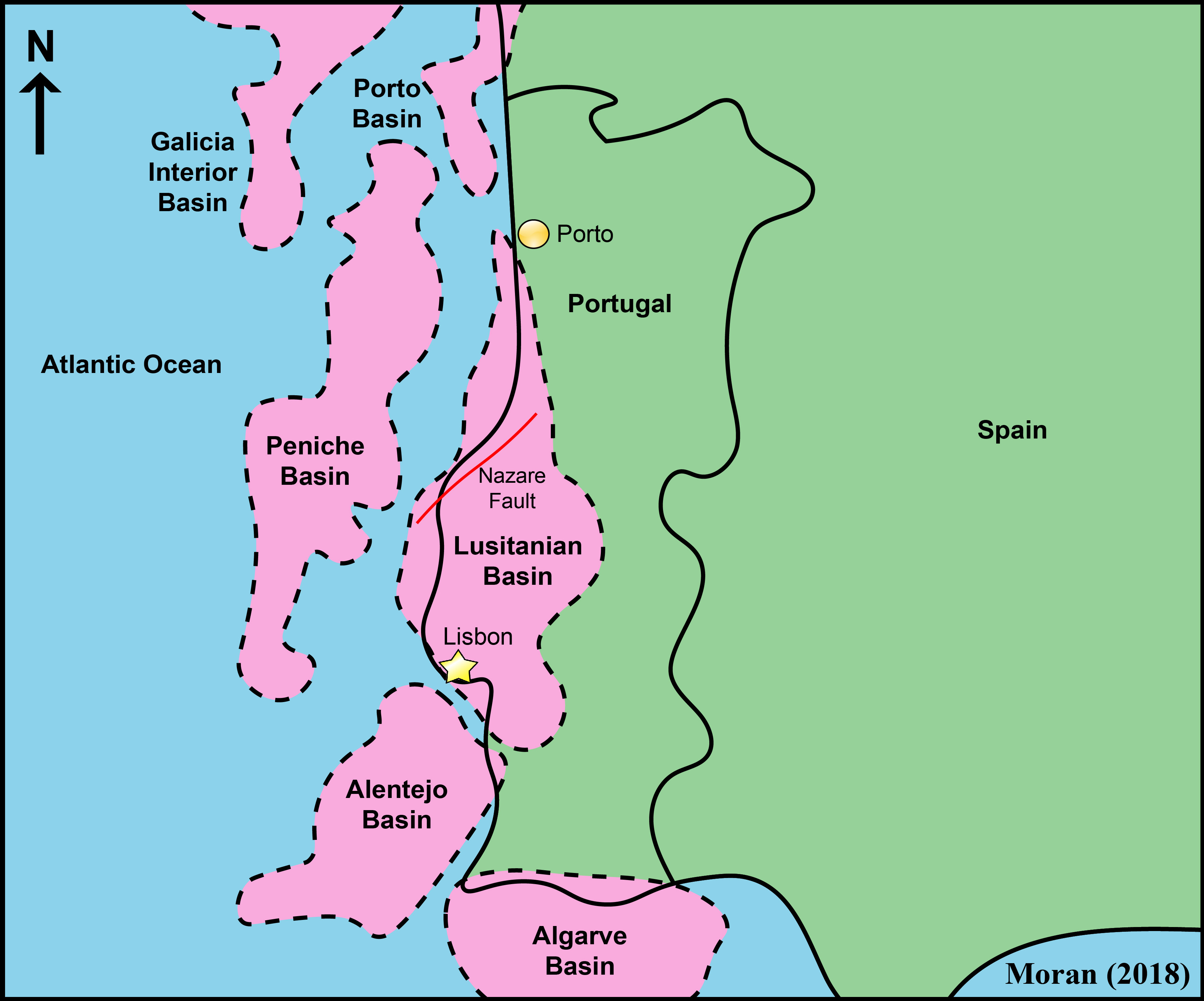
Surrounding geological structures.

The Lusitanian Basin results from the opening of the North Atlantic Ocean due to Mesozoic extension. Throughout the complete formation of the basin, from the Late Triassic to the Cretaceous, five distinct phases can be defined, with four stages of rifting activity:

- In the first active phase, during the Late Triassic to the Early Jurassic, rifting was initiated between Newfoundland and Iberia. It is characterized by symmetrical grabens and half-grabens and is concentrated in the central areas of the basin.
- During the Early Jurassic, the second active phase is characterized by minor salt movements along most substantial faults and occurs south of the substantial, centrally located Nazaré fault.
- The third active phase initiated during the beginning of the Late Jurassic. This phase is defined by the onlapping of the Oxfordian succession on salt pillows that formed in association with fault activity.
- A major interval of tectonic dormancy followed. This is most likely due to the opening of the Central Atlantic. During this time, in the Late Jurassic, there was widespread fault-controlled subsidence.
- The fourth and final active phase, initiated between the latest Late Jurassic and the earliest Early Cretaceous, triggered salt movement and the development of salt structures. Extensional tectonics ended during the Early Cretaceous.

=== Structural geology ===
The most significant faults and salt structures throughout the Lusitanian Basin trend north-northeast, parallel to the elongation of the shoreline. The faults that trend northeast to east-northeast are fewer in number. However, they are fairly substantial—for example, the Nazare Fault. The north-trending faults are concentrated mainly in the central part of the Lusitanian Basin. These faults are a part of in important structural trend within the Estremadura Trough which highlights the Oxfordian extension within the basin. West-northwest trending faults are scattered throughout the basin. Both thrust faults and normal faults are observed. The thrusting observed is resultant of the basement-attached inversion movements of the pre-existing normal faults during the Miocene. Most of the faults within the basin are fairly high-angle, with some shallowing with depth observed. There is always faulting beneath salt structures and it is speculated that the movement of the salt structures is caused by basement-influenced faulting.

== Characteristics ==
=== Subdivisions ===
Resultant of diapirism leading to the formation of salt pillows, the Lusitanian Basin can be divided into seven different sub-basins:

- Southern Lusitanian Basin (SLB)
- Central Lusitanian Basin (CLB)
- Northern Lusitanian Basin (NLB)
- Arruda Subbasin (ASB)
- Turcifal Subbasin (TSB)
- Bombarral Subbasin (BSB)
- Monte Real Subbasin (MRSB)

=== Paleontology ===
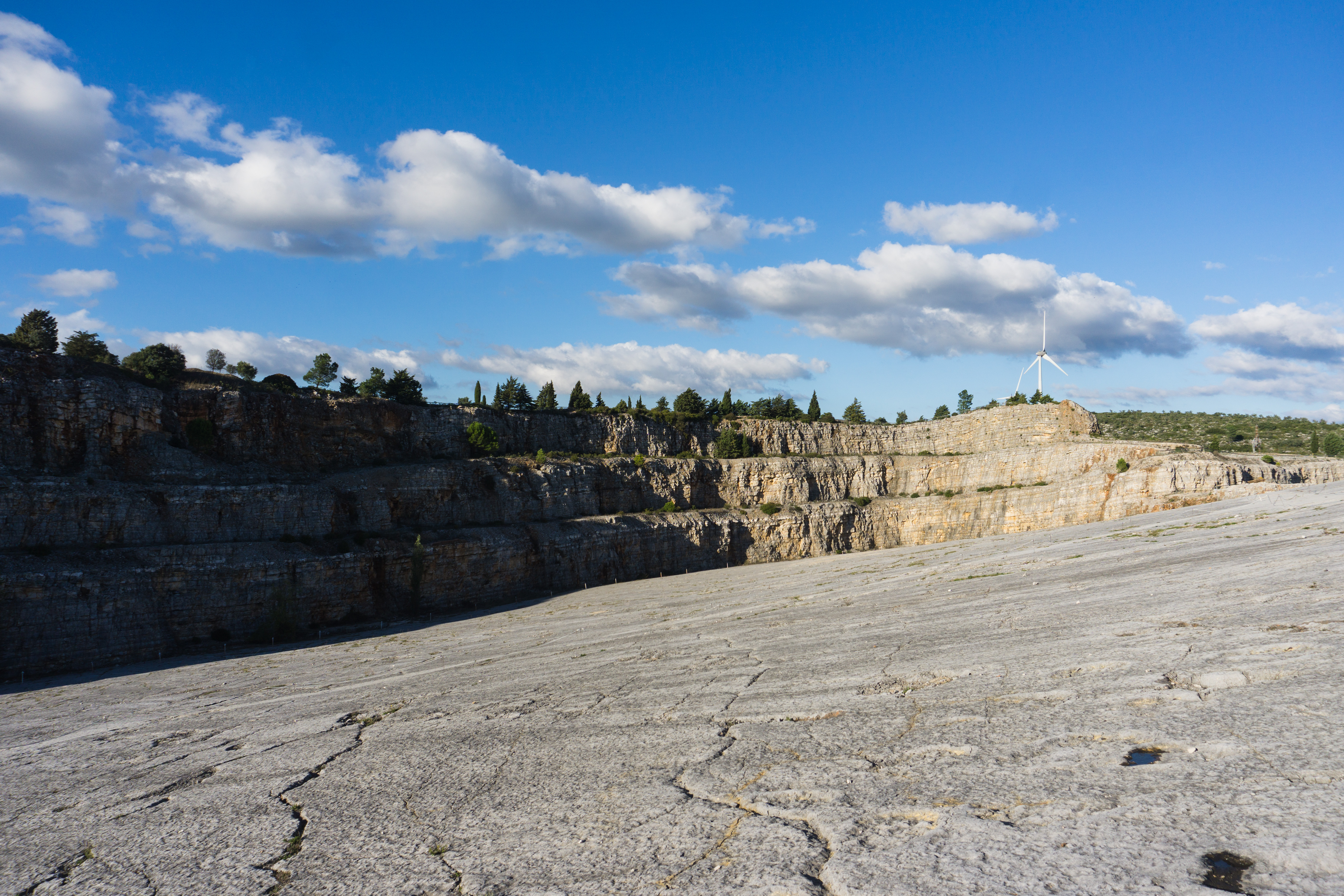
The Aire Range Dinosaur Tracks Natural Monument, Calcários Micríticos Formation

The Lusitanian basin Triassic to Cretaceous rocks provided thousands of fossils, from plants, microfossils, invertebrates and vertebrates. The most productive formations are the Late Jurassic Lourinhã Formation, Alcobaça Formation, and Montejunto Formation and the Cretaceous Papo Seco Formation. This includes an outstanding abundance of Jurassic mammals, and dinosaur fossils and trackways.

=== Regional stratigraphy ===
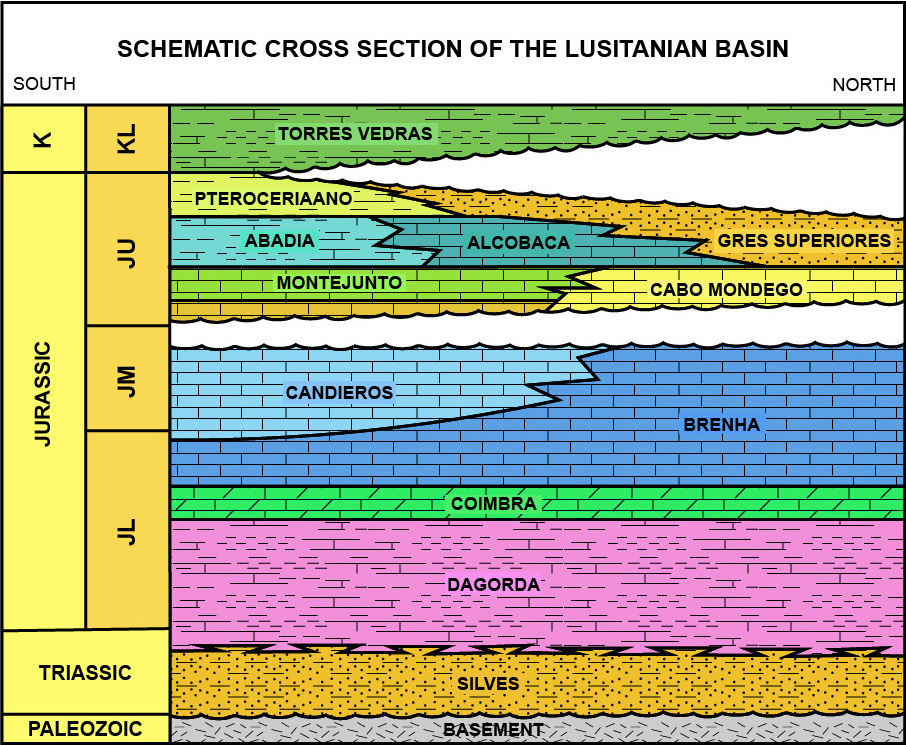
Stratigraphic column of the Lusitanian Basin during the time of its formation. Modified from GEOExPro (2016).

The Lusitanian Basin is a late Triassic rift basin is filled with synrift siliciclastics and capped by post-rift evaporites. In the late Triassic, there was deposition of fluvial sand and clay that eventually evolved into deposition of shallow marine dolomites during the lower and middle Jurassic. These sediments are known as the Silves, Dagorda, and Coimbra Formations. Deposition of Carbonates of the Brenha and Candieros Formations are in shelf, ramp, and sub-marine fan environments and filled the basin during the early and middle Jurassic. The carbonate formations are commonly interbedded with shale and there are local turbidite beds also present. Below the halite-bearing evaporites that compose the Dagorda formation are the synrift continental siliciclastics of the Silves formation. Above the Dagorda formation is the post-rift carbonate shelf environment—the Coimbra dolomite, Brenha limestone, and Cardieros carbonate grainstone. A substantial unconformity, associated with significant tectonic activity, characterizes the top of the sequence. The carbonate shelf environment is still present in the Upper Jurassic—characterized by the Montejunto grainstone and reef facies, Cabacos organic-rich limestone (capped by anhydrite). Above this sequence, deposition is dominated by the siliciclastics from the Meseta highlands. The Abadia formation is composed of shale, marl, siltstone, and minimal sandstone. The rest of the Upper Jurassic and Cretaceous is dominated by westward-prograding continental clastics.

== Hydrocarbon exploration ==
In the basin, all Jurassic source-rocks could possibly be within the hydrocarbon generation window. However, this is not the case throughout the entire basin. This is due to the highly heterogeneous nature of basin subsidence, especially in the Late Jurassic. Around 100 exploratory wells have been drilled in the basin. 80% of these wells, from Triassic, Jurassic, and Cretaceous strata, had oil and gas shows while drilling and 27% recovered live oil or gas at surface. While there is substantial hydrocarbon potential in this basin alone, Portugal imports 100% of its fossil fuel. There are two major petroleum systems at work within the basin—Subsalt and Suprasalt. In the subsalt petroleum system, there are Paleozoic source rocks and synrift Triassic sandstone reservoirs that are sealed by Dagorda evaporites. In the suprasalt system, the oldest source rock is the Lower Brenha formation. The best reservoirs to mention include the Coimbra dolomite and Upper Dagorda carbonates, Candieiros oolitic and bioclastic grainstones, and the fractured carbonates of the Brenha formation. Seals are tight or marly carbonates of the Brenha and overlying basal Upper Jurassic.

N. Pimentel1 and R. Pena dos Reis (2016) - PETROLEUM SYSTEMS OF THE WEST IBERIAN MARGIN: A REVIEW OF THE LUSITANIAN BASIN AND THE DEEP OFFSHORE PENICHE BASIN. Journal of Petroleum Geology, Vol. 39(3), July 2016, pp 305-326.
