= Himalayitidae =

Himalayitidae Temporal range: 150.8–140.2 Ma

Scientific classification
- Kingdom: Animalia
- Phylum: Mollusca
- Class: Cephalopoda
- Subclass: †Ammonoidea
- Order: †Ammonitida
- Superfamily: †Perisphinctoidea
- Family: †Himalayitidae; Spath, 1925

Genera
- †Ardesciella; †Aulacosphinctes; †Corongoceras; †Durangites; †Hegaratites; †Himalayites; †Parodontoceras; †Parrasiella; †Riasanella; †Tithopeltoceras; †Toucasiella; †Windhauseniceras

Synonyms
- Himalayitinae

Extinct family of ammonites

Himalayitidae is an extinct family of ammonites in the superfamily Perisphinctoidea. The family existed from the Tithonian of the Jurassic to the Berriasian of the Cretaceous. The family is thought to derive from Perisphinctidae.
