= Calcare di Cellina =

Geologic formation in Italy

- Stratigraphic range: Hauterivian-Aptian; ~136–113 Ma
- Type: Geological formation

Lithology
- Primary: Limestone

Location
- Coordinates: 46.2°N 13.3°E
- Approximate paleocoordinates: 29.0°N 21.1°E
- Region: Friulia-Venezia Giulia
- Country: Italy

Type section
- Named for: Cellina limestone
- Calcare di Cellina (Italy)

The Calcare di Cellina (Italian for Cellina Limestone, is a Hauterivian to Aptian geologic formation in Friulia-Venezia Giulia, Italy. Fossil sauropod tracks have been reported from the formation.

== Description ==
The Calcare di Cellina comprises a limestone facies corresponding to the peritidal successions of the inner part of the Periadriatic carbonate platforms. The layer in which the tracks were found is characterized by intertidal muds which were later covered and sealed by a transgressive subtidal layer, representing a moderately more open but low energy environment. Most of the limestone blocks show similar lithofacies, with bed thickness exceeding a metre, the presence of occasional stylolites and rare requienids; the bed surfaces present mud cracks, bioturbation due to burrowing organisms and pedogenetic breccias (sometimes with black pebbles). The color ranges from whitish through light brown to pale pink. The blocks sometimes present desiccation structures (mud cracks, birdseyes) and mostly comprise muddy facies, often with ostracods. In contrast, the level with the footprint is a fossiliferous wackestone (with foraminifers and ostracods), with no traces of subaerial exposure.

== Fossil content ==
The following fossils were reported from the formation:

Ichnofossils

- Carnosauria indet.
- Sauropoda indet.
- ?Dinosauria indet.

Foraminifera

- Campanellula capuensis

Flora

- Salpingoporella dinarica

== See also ==
- List of dinosaur-bearing rock formations
  - List of stratigraphic units with sauropodomorph tracks
    - Sauropod tracks
