= Luchak Formation =

Geologic formation in Tajikistan

- Stratigraphic range: Albian
- Type: Geological formation

Lithology
- Primary: Oolitic limestone

Location
- Coordinates: 38.3°N 68.3°E
- Approximate paleocoordinates: 34.8°N 64.4°E
- Country: Tajikistan
- Luchak Formation (Tajikistan)

The Luchak Formation (Russian: Luchak Svita) is an Early Cretaceous (Albian) geologic formation in Tajikistan. Sauropod footprints have been recovered from the formation.

== Fossil content ==
Color key: Taxon / Reclassified taxon / Taxon falsely reported as present / Dubious taxon or junior synonym / Ichnotaxon / Ootaxon / Morphotaxon	Notes; Uncertain or tentative taxa are in small text; ~~crossed out~~ taxa are discredited.

=== Sauropods ===
Sauropods from the Luchak Formation
Genus	Species	Material	Notes	Images
Babatagosauropus	B. bulini	Footprints		
Kafirniganosauropus	K. isp.	Footprints		
Akmechetosauropus	A. makhkamovi	Footprints		
Chorrokhosauropus	C. khakimovi	Footprints		

== See also ==
- List of dinosaur-bearing rock formations
  - List of stratigraphic units with sauropodomorph tracks
    - Sauropod tracks
