= Antenor Navarro Formation =

Geologic formation in Brazil

- Stratigraphic range: Berriasian-Barremian; ~145–125 Ma
- Type: Geological formation
- Unit of: Rio do Peixe Group
- Underlies: Sousa Formation

Lithology
- Primary: Sandstone
- Other: Siltstone, conglomerate

Location
- Coordinates: 6.7°S 38.2°W
- Approximate paleocoordinates: 6.5°S 5.6°W
- Region: Serrote do Letreiro, Paraíba
- Country: Brazil
- Extent: Sousa Subbasin, Rio do Peixe Basin

Type section
- Named for: Antenor Navarro
- Antenor Navarro Formation (Brazil)

The Antenor Navarro Formation is an Early Cretaceous geologic formation in Brazil. Fossil sauropod tracks have been reported from the formation.

== Etymology ==
Antenor Navarro, for whom the formation was named, had been a major leader of the Revolution of 1930, which brought Getúlio Vargas to power. He was killed in a plane crash in 1932, at the age of 34, and his name commemorated also in hundreds of street names and public institutions in Brazilian cities.

== Fossil content ==
Among others the following fossils have been found in the formation:

- Caririchnium magnificum
- Staurichnium diogenis
- Carnosauria indet.
- Nodosauridae indet.
- Sauropoda indet.

== See also ==
- List of dinosaur-bearing rock formations
  - List of stratigraphic units with sauropodomorph tracks
    - Sauropod tracks

== Bibliography ==
- Weishampel, David B.; Dodson, Peter; Osmólska, Halszka (2004), The Dinosauria, 2nd edition, Berkeley: University of California Press, pp. 1–880, ISBN 0-520-24209-2
