= Calcários Micríticos da Serra de Aire =

Portuguese Formation

- Stratigraphic range: Bathonian; ~167–165 Ma
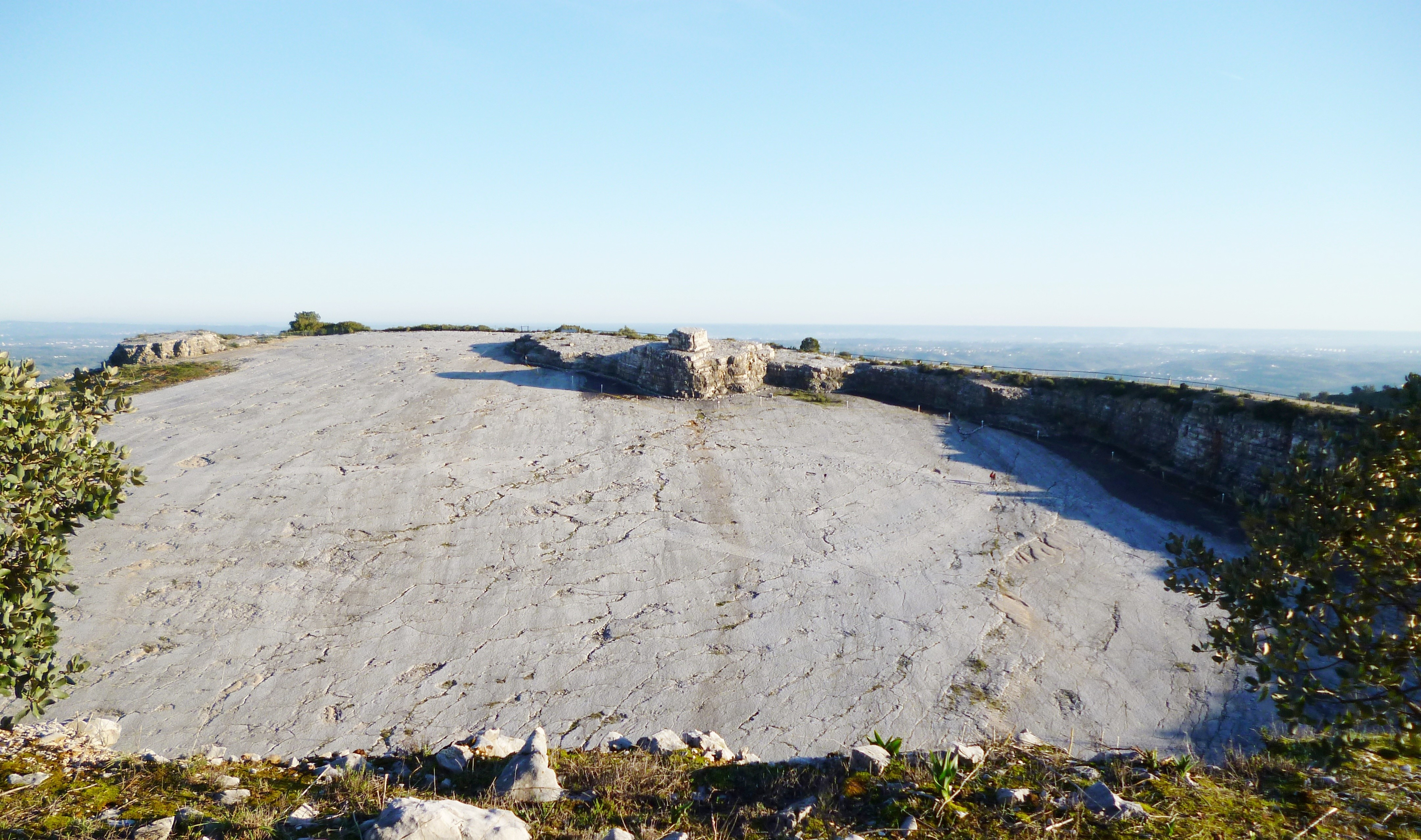
- Type: Geological formation

Lithology
- Primary: Micritic limestone
- Other: Pyrite

Location
- Coordinates: 39.6°N 8.6°W
- Approximate paleocoordinates: 32.6°N 2.9°E
- Region: Santarém
- Country: Portugal
- Extent: Lusitanian Basin

Type section
- Named for: Serra de Aire
- Calcários Micríticos da Serra de Aire (Portugal)

The Calcários Micríticos da Serra de Aire is a Bathonian geologic formation in Portugal. Fossil sauropod tracks have been reported from the formation.

== Fossil content ==
- Megalosauripus sp.
- Sauropoda indet.

== See also ==
- Pegadas de Dinossáurios da Serra de Aire Natural Monument
- List of dinosaur-bearing rock formations
  - List of stratigraphic units with sauropodomorph tracks
    - Sauropod tracks
