= Zorillo Formation =

Mesozoic geologic formation in Mexico

- Stratigraphic range: Mesozoic
- Type: Geological formation

The Zorillo Formation is a Mesozoic geologic formation in Mexico. Fossil sauropod tracks have been reported from the formation.

== See also ==
- List of dinosaur-bearing rock formations
  - List of stratigraphic units with sauropodomorph tracks
    - Sauropod tracks
