= De Queen Formation =

Geological formation in Arkansas, United States

- Stratigraphic range: Cretaceous
- Type: Geological formation
- Unit of: Trinity Group

Location
- Region: Arkansas
- Country: United States

Type section
- Named for: De Queen, Sevier County, Arkansas
- Named by: Hugh Dismore Miser and Albert Homer Purdue

The De Queen Formation, formerly known as the DeQueen Limestone Member is a Mesozoic geological formation located in southwestern Arkansas and southeastern Oklahoma in the United States. Fossil sauropod and theropod tracks have been reported from the formation. It preserves fossils dating back to the Cretaceous period, particularly the Albian age.

== See also ==
- List of fossiliferous stratigraphic units in Arkansas
- List of dinosaur-bearing rock formations
  - List of stratigraphic units with sauropodomorph tracks
    - Sauropod tracks
- Paleontology in Arkansas
