= Dürrestein Formation =

Carnian geologic formation in Italy

- Stratigraphic range: Carnian; 222–208 Ma
- Type: Geological formation

Lithology
- Primary: Limestone

Location
- Coordinates: 46.7°N 12.2°E
- Approximate paleocoordinates: 13.3°N 19.9°E
- Country: Italy
- Extent: Southern Limestone Alps
- Dürrestein Formation (Italy)

The Dürrestein Formation is a Carnian geologic formation in Italy. Fossil prosauropod tracks have been reported from the formation.

== Fossil content ==
The following fossils have been reported from the formation:

Sponges

- Atrochaetetes medius
- Cryptocoelia zitteli
- Jablonskyia andrusovi
- Sestrostomella robusta
- Uvanella irregularis
- Amblisyphonella sp.
- Colospongia sp.
- Dendronella sp.
- Solenopora sp.
- Stellinspongia sp.

Corals

- Margarosmilia zieteni
- Margarosmilia sp.

== See also ==
- List of dinosaur-bearing rock formations
  - List of stratigraphic units with sauropodomorph tracks
    - Prosauropod tracks
- List of fossiliferous stratigraphic units in Italy
