= Edwards Formation =

- Stratigraphic range: Albian
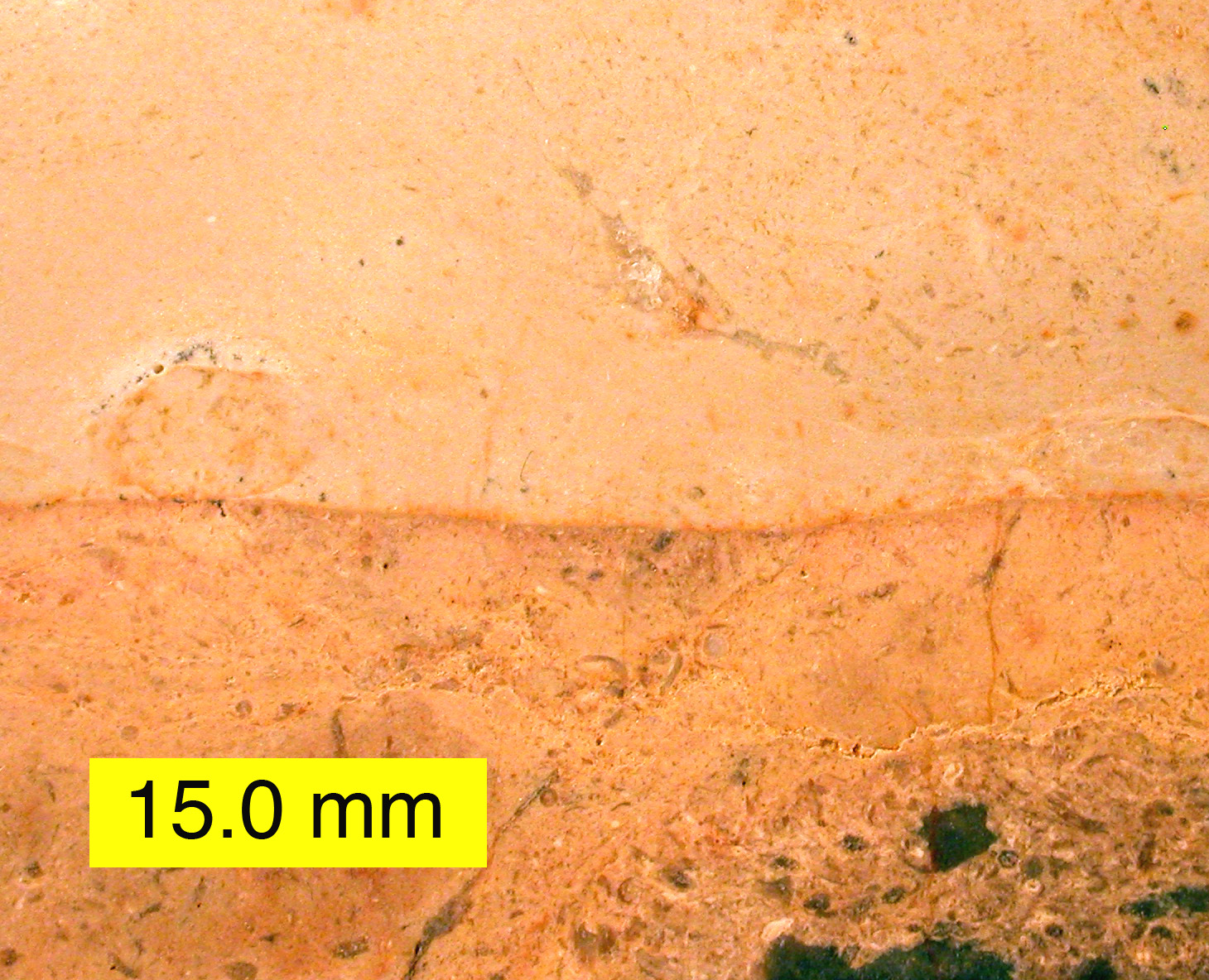
- Edwards Disconformity
- Type: Geological formation

Location
- Country: United States

The Edwards Formation is a Mesozoic geologic formation in the United States. Fossil sauropod tracks have been reported from the formation.

== See also ==
- List of dinosaur-bearing rock formations
- Sauropod tracks
