= John R. Foster =

American paleontologist

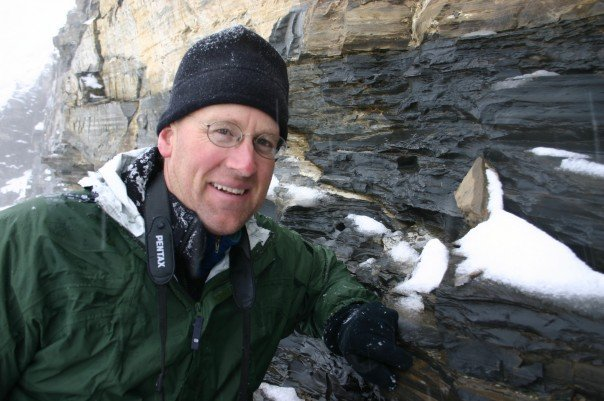
- Foster, at the Walcott Quarry, Burgess Shale in 2007

Education
- Education: Occidental College, South Dakota School of Mines and Technology, University of Colorado

John Russell Foster (born November 3, 1966) is an American paleontologist. Foster has worked with dinosaur and other fossil vertebrate remains from the Late Jurassic of the Colorado Plateau and Rocky Mountains. Foster is also working on Cambrian age trilobite faunas in the southwest region of the American West. He named the crocodyliform trace fossil Hatcherichnus sanjuanensis in 1997 and identified the first known occurrence of the theropod trace fossil Hispanosauropus in North America in 2015. He was a member of the research team that named the Early Cretaceous North American turiasaurian sauropod Mierasaurus, and he also named the atoposaurid crocodilian Theriosuchus morrisonensis and the dryolestid mammal Amblotherium megistodon, both from the Morrison Formation.

== Career ==
- Born November 3, 1966, San Diego, California.
- High School, Los Gatos High School, Los Gatos, California. 1985
- A.B. Geology, Occidental College, Los Angeles, California. 1989
- M.S. Paleontology, South Dakota School of Mines and Technology, Rapid City, South Dakota. 1993
- Ph.D. University of Colorado, Boulder, Colorado. 1998

He served for thirteen years as Curator of Paleontology at the Museum of Western Colorado from 2001 to 2014, and had previously worked at the Denver Museum of Nature and Science, Utah Geological Survey, and University of Wyoming. He was adjunct faculty of geology at Colorado Mesa University, Grand Junction, Colorado during much of his time at the Museum of Western Colorado. From 2014 to 2018 he was the Director of the Museum of Moab. He is currently a curator at the Utah Field House of Natural History State Park Museum in Vernal, Utah.

=== Professional work ===
An expert on the Late Jurassic, he has spent more than thirty years excavating fossils across the western United States, authoring and coauthoring more than 90 professional papers, on topics ranging from Triassic to Cretaceous in age, with a few Cambrian and Cenozoic studies appearing as well. In addition to dinosaurs, he has spent over a decade working in the Cambrian shales of the western United States.

=== Triassic ===
In December 2017, he and coauthors Xavier A. Jenkins of Arizona State University and Robert J. Gay of Colorado Canyons Association formally published their study on the oldest known dinosaur from Utah, a neotheropod that is likely an animal similar to Coelophysis.

=== Jurassic ===
His researches in the Late Jurassic of the Colorado Plateau and Rocky Mountains includes the geographic and environmental distributions of microvertebrates and dinosaurs. He served as the lead researcher at the Mygatt-Moore Quarry in western Colorado for 14 years, and continues to work in the Late Jurassic of eastern Utah and western Colorado. His current work includes the excavation of the first known dinosaur from the western United States, Dystrophaeus, on Bureau of Land Management lands in San Juan County, Utah, along with development of recently discovered fossil plant localities in the Morrison Formation. Foster had a ceratosaurid ceratosaur theropod dinosaur, Fosterovenator, named after him in 2014

=== Cambrian ===
His researches in the Cambrian of the Great Basin and Colorado Plateau, includes the study of taphonomy and biostratinomy of trilobites, and what this information indicates about the paleoenvironmental conditions on the shallow shelf of western North American during the early Paleozoic.

== Popular books ==
Foster is the author of Jurassic West: The Dinosaurs of the Morrison Formation and Their World in 2007, followed by a second edition in 2020. The first edition of Jurassic West was followed by his second book Cambrian Ocean World in 2014. Most recently he released Beast Companions: The Unsung Animals of the Dinosaurs' World in 2024.
