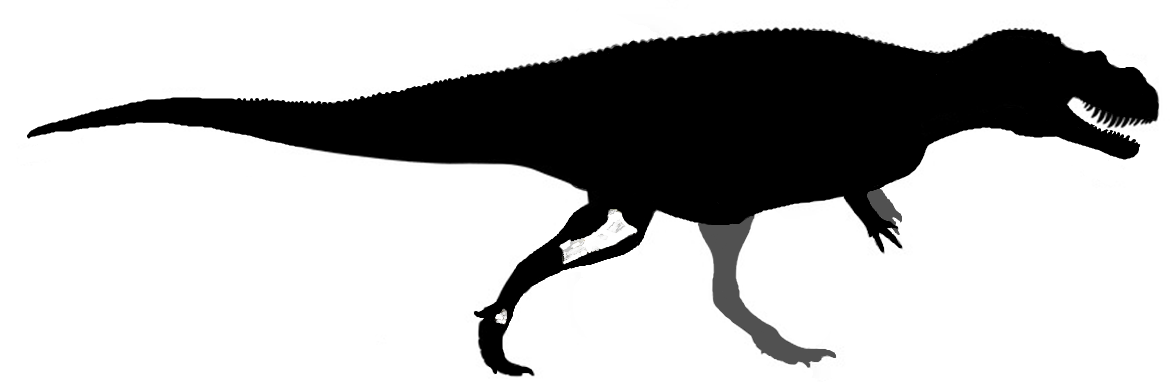
- Skeletal restoration

Scientific classification
- Kingdom: Animalia
- Phylum: Chordata
- Class: Reptilia
- Clade: Dinosauria
- Clade: Saurischia
- Clade: Theropoda
- Clade: †Ceratosauria
- Genus: †Fosterovenator; Dalman, 2014

Type species
- †Fosterovenator churei Dalman, 2014

= Fosterovenator =

Fosterovenator Temporal range: Late Jurassic, 155–147 Ma

Extinct genus of dinosaurs

Fosterovenator (meaning "Foster's hunter") is a genus of ceratosaur dinosaur known from the Late Jurassic Morrison Formation of Wyoming. The holotype is YPM VP 058267A, B, and C, a tibia with an articulated astragalus. An additional specimen is known, the paratype YPM VP 058267D, a fibula of a larger individual.

The holotype remains were discovered in 1879 by Arthur Lakes at Como Bluff, Wyoming, and consist of a nearly-complete right tibia with a co-ossified astragalus, probably of a juvenile. The paratype consists of a complete right fibula measuring 27.5 cm (10.8 in) in length and belonging to a much larger individual. The overall shape of the known material is similar to that of Elaphrosaurus. However, ceratosaurian affinities of Fosterovenator (at least of the paratype) have been questioned.

== Discovery and naming ==
In 1879 during an expedition by paleontologists Othniel Charles Marsh and Arthur Lakes to the Quarry 12 outcrop of the Brushy Basin Member of the Morrison Formation in Como Bluff, Wyoming, several small theropod fossils were unearthed. The strata of Quarry 12 derive from the late Kimmeridgian to early Tithonian stages of the Late Jurassic, in numerical terms around 155 to 147 million years old. This was one of many expeditions carried out during the Bone Wars, a competition between paleontologists Edward Drinker Cope and Othniel Charles Marsh, which collected scores of dinosaur skeletons from the Morrison Formation. Among the theropod fossils collected was a nearly complete right tibia (shin bone) and a co-ossified (joined) astragalus of a juvenile individual. Additionally, a right fibula of an adult individual was unearthed. These fossils were deposited at the Yale Peabody Museum in New Haven, Connecticut where the right tibia and associated astragalus were given the specimen number YPM VP 058267 A-C whereas the fibula is YPM VP 058267 D. This was one of many dinosaur specimens discovered at Quarry 12 during the late 19th century, with the site producing fossils of the theropods Allosaurus and Torvosaurus, sauropods Camarasaurus and Diplodocus, and the ornithischian Stegosaurus.

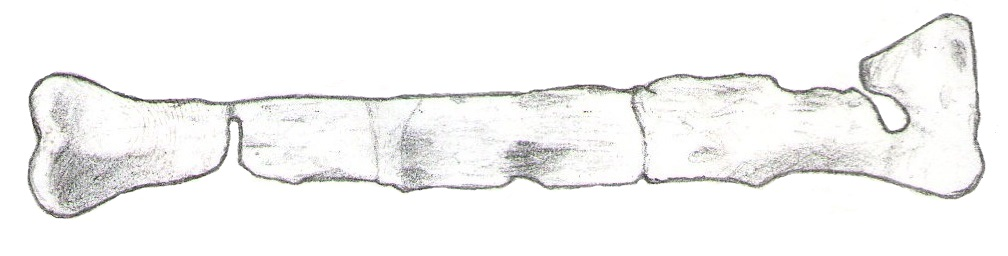
Right fibula, of the paratype specimen YPM VP 058267D

YPM VP 058267 A-D was described in scientific literature in the journal Volumina Jurassica in 2014 by researcher Sebastian G. Dalman. The right tibia and associated astragalus (YPM VP 058267 A-C) were designated the type specimen of a new genus and species, Fosterovenator churei. The generic name Fosterovenator honors paleontologist John R. Foster and the Greek root venator ("hunter"). The specific name churei honors paleontologist Daniel J. Chure. YPM VP 058267 D was made a paratype of Fosterovenator churei, however some have argued that they do not come from the same taxon.

== Paleoecology ==
The Morrison Formation is a sequence of shallow marine and alluvial sediments which, according to radiometric dating, ranges between 156.3 million years old (Ma) at its base, to ~150 ma at the top, placing it in the late Oxfordian, Kimmeridgian, and early Tithonian stages of the Upper Jurassic period. The paleoenvironment of the Morrison Formation is interpreted as a semiarid environment with distinct wet and dry seasons, and flat floodplains. Vegetation varied from river-lining forests of conifers, tree ferns, and ferns (gallery forests), to fern savannas with occasional trees such as the Araucaria-like conifer Brachyphyllum. The Morrison Basin where dinosaurs lived stretched from New Mexico to Alberta and Saskatchewan, and was formed when the precursors to the Front Range of the Rocky Mountains started pushing up to the west. The deposits from their east-facing drainage basins were carried by streams and rivers and deposited in swampy lowlands, lakes, river channels and floodplains.

Dinosaurs known from the Morrison include the theropods Ceratosaurus, Ornitholestes, and Allosaurus, the sauropods Apatosaurus, Brachiosaurus, Camarasaurus, and Diplodocus, and the ornithischians Camptosaurus, Dryosaurus, and Stegosaurus. Other vertebrates that shared this paleoenvironment included ray-finned fishes, frogs, salamanders, turtles, sphenodonts, lizards, pterosaurs, and crocodylomorphs. Shells of bivalves and aquatic snails are also common. The flora of the period has been revealed by fossils of green algae, mosses, horsetails, cycads, ginkgoes, and several families of conifers.

== See also ==
- Timeline of ceratosaur research
