= Wagad Formation =

Geologic formation in India

- Stratigraphic range: Oxfordian-Kimmeridgian; ~161–155 Ma
- Type: Geological formation
- Underlies: Katrol Formation
- Overlies: N/A
- Area: Kutch

Location
- Coordinates: 23.5°N 70.5°E
- Approximate paleocoordinates: 27.3°S 33.3°E
- Region: Gujarat
- Country: India
- Wagad Formation (India)

The Wagad Formation is a Mesozoic Late Jurassic geologic formation in India. Fossilised sauropod and ornithopod tracks have been reported from the formation.

== Paleobiota ==
=== Dinosaurs ===
Ornithischian

Ornithischians from the Wagad Formation
Genus	Species	Material	Notes	Images
?Ornithopoda	indet	Fossilised Tracks	An Ornithopod	

Sauropods

Sauropods from the Wagad Formation
Genus	Species	Material	Notes	Images
?Sauropoda	indet	Fossilised Tracks	A Sauropod	

== See also ==
- List of dinosaur-bearing rock formations
  - List of stratigraphic units with sauropodomorph tracks
    - Sauropod tracks
  - List of stratigraphic units with ornithischian tracks

== Footnotes ==
=== Bibliography ===
- Weishampel, David B.; Dodson, Peter; Osmólska, Halszka, eds. (2004). The Dinosauria (2nd ed.). Berkeley: University of California Press. pp. 1–880. ISBN 0-520-24209-2.
