= Montejunto Formation =

Geological formation in Portugal

- Stratigraphic range: Oxfordian
- Type: Geological formation
- Underlies: Alcobaça Formation

Lithology
- Primary: Limestone
- Other: Mudstone

Location
- Coordinates: 39.5°N 9.2°W
- Approximate paleocoordinates: 33.7°N 1.6°E
- Country: Portugal
- Extent: Lusitanian Basin
- Montejunto Formation (Portugal)

The Montejunto Formation is an Oxfordian geologic formation in Portugal. Dinosaur remains diagnostic to the genus level are among the fossils that have been recovered from the formation.

== Fossil content ==
- ?Megalosaurus insignis (Tetanurae indet.)

== See also ==
- List of dinosaur-bearing rock formations
  - List of stratigraphic units with few dinosaur genera
