= Corongoceras =

Corongoceras Temporal range: 150.8–140.2 Ma

Scientific classification
- Kingdom: Animalia
- Phylum: Mollusca
- Class: Cephalopoda
- Subclass: †Ammonoidea
- Order: †Ammonitida
- Family: †Himalayitidae
- Genus: †Corongoceras; Spath, 1925

Species
- †Corongoceras alternans; †Corongoceras cordobai; †Corongoceras evolutum; †Corongoceras lotenoense

Synonyms
- Himalayites (Corongoceras); Micracanthoceras (Corongoceras)

Genus of molluscs (fossil)

Corongoceras is a genus of ammonites in the family Himalayitidae.

== See also ==
- List of ammonite genera
