= Aire Range Dinosaur Tracks Natural Monument =

- IUCN category III (natural monument or feature)
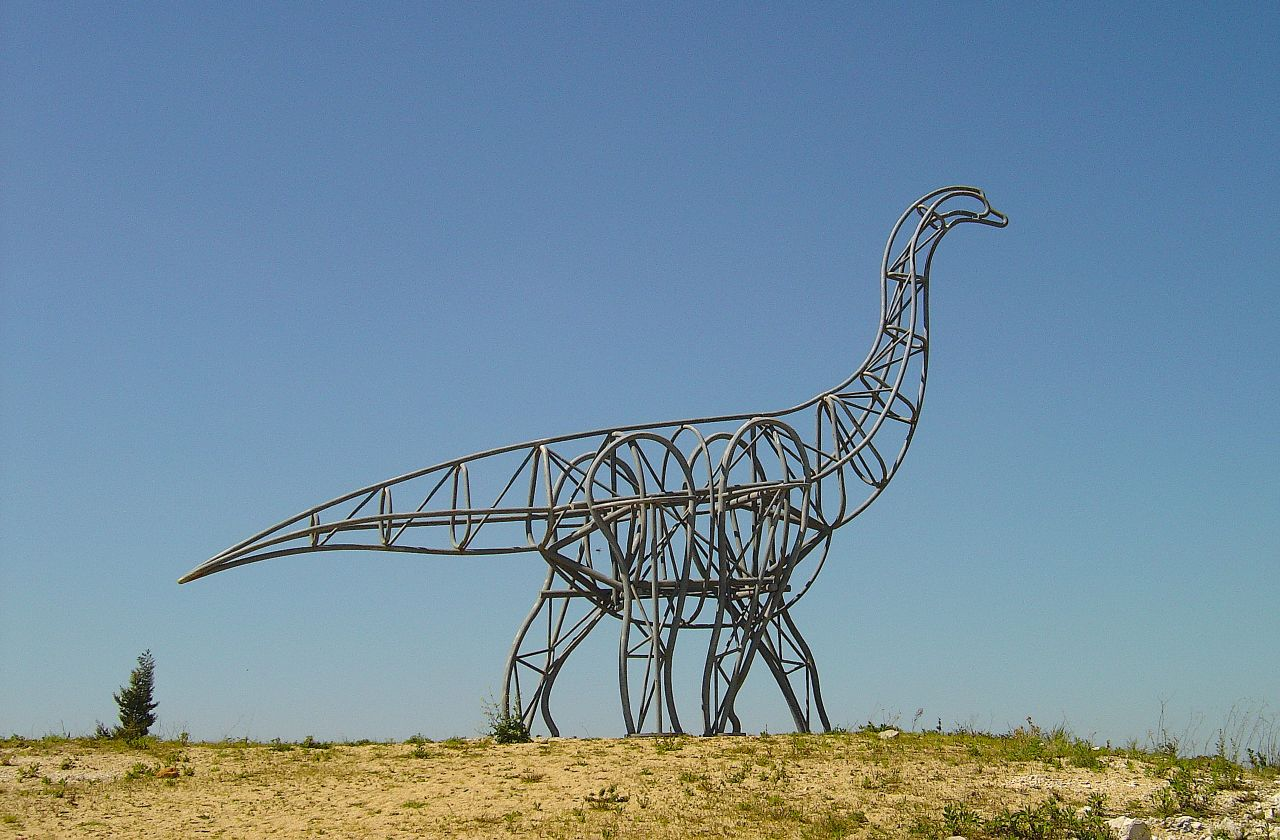
- The site's mascot, "Aramossauro", roughly translated to "Wiresaurus"

- Location within Portugal
- Location: Serras de Aire e Candeeiros Natural Park, Portugal
- Nearest city: Fátima
- Coordinates: 39°34′12.1″N 8°35′22.3″W
- Area: 54.01 hectares (133.5 acres)
- Elevation: 320 m (1,050 ft)
- Established: 1996

The Aire Range Dinosaur Tracks Natural Monument, also known as Ourém - Torres Novas Dinosaur Tracks Natural Monument, is a natural monument in the Serras de Aire e Candeeiros Natural Park, Portugal, known for its long and well-preserved sauropod trackways. When discovered, it had the single longest known sauropod trackway in the world at 147 m (482 ft) long.

The natural monument consists of approximately twenty different trackways on a broad limestone stratum exposure, part of the Calcários Micríticos da Serra de Aire formation, and 175 millions of years in age. Unusually well preserved, many footprints display claw and digit impressions, as seen in the gallery photos below, which allows for some level of determination of the paw anatomy of the animals.

== Origin ==
The formation dates back to the middle Jurassic Period (between the Bajocian and Bathonian ages). At that time, Europe was still connected to the North American continent and, between Iberia and Newfoundland, penetrated a shallow sea of warm and clear waters, conducive to the formation of coral reefs.

The area in itself was a coastal plain, full of periodically flooded areas, consequence of aquifers, one to two meters thick. Geological interactions millions of years later gave rise to what is now the Serra de Aire mountain range, in which the slab sits slightly dipping at an approximate altitude of 300 m (984 ft).

== History ==
The area was originally a quarry, the Pedreira do Galinha.

On July 2nd, 1994, Ricardo Matos da Silva, João Pedro Falcão and João Carvalho, discovered the footprints that would turn the quarry into the current monument.

== Visiting Tips ==
The site consists of a near-horizontal limestone bed, atop a sizeable anticline, which gently and progressively dips towards the northwest. The best times of the day to visit the site, and observe the shaded contrast between the footprints and the surrounding rock layer, are therefore as early as possible in the morning or late in the afternoon, when the sun is at a low incidence angle to the stratum.

== Gallery ==
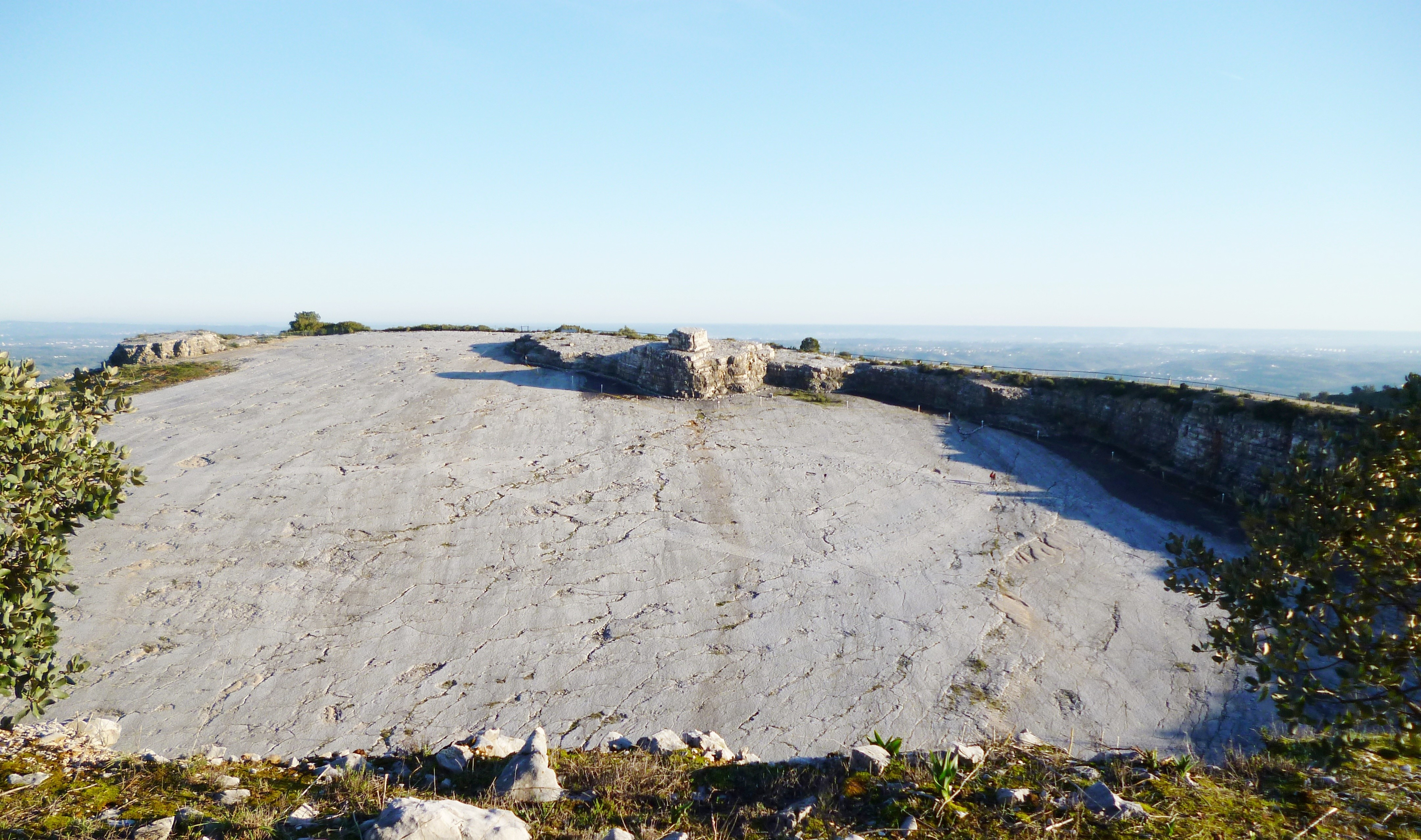
The trackway site as seen in 2012, when it was still known as Galinha Quarry.

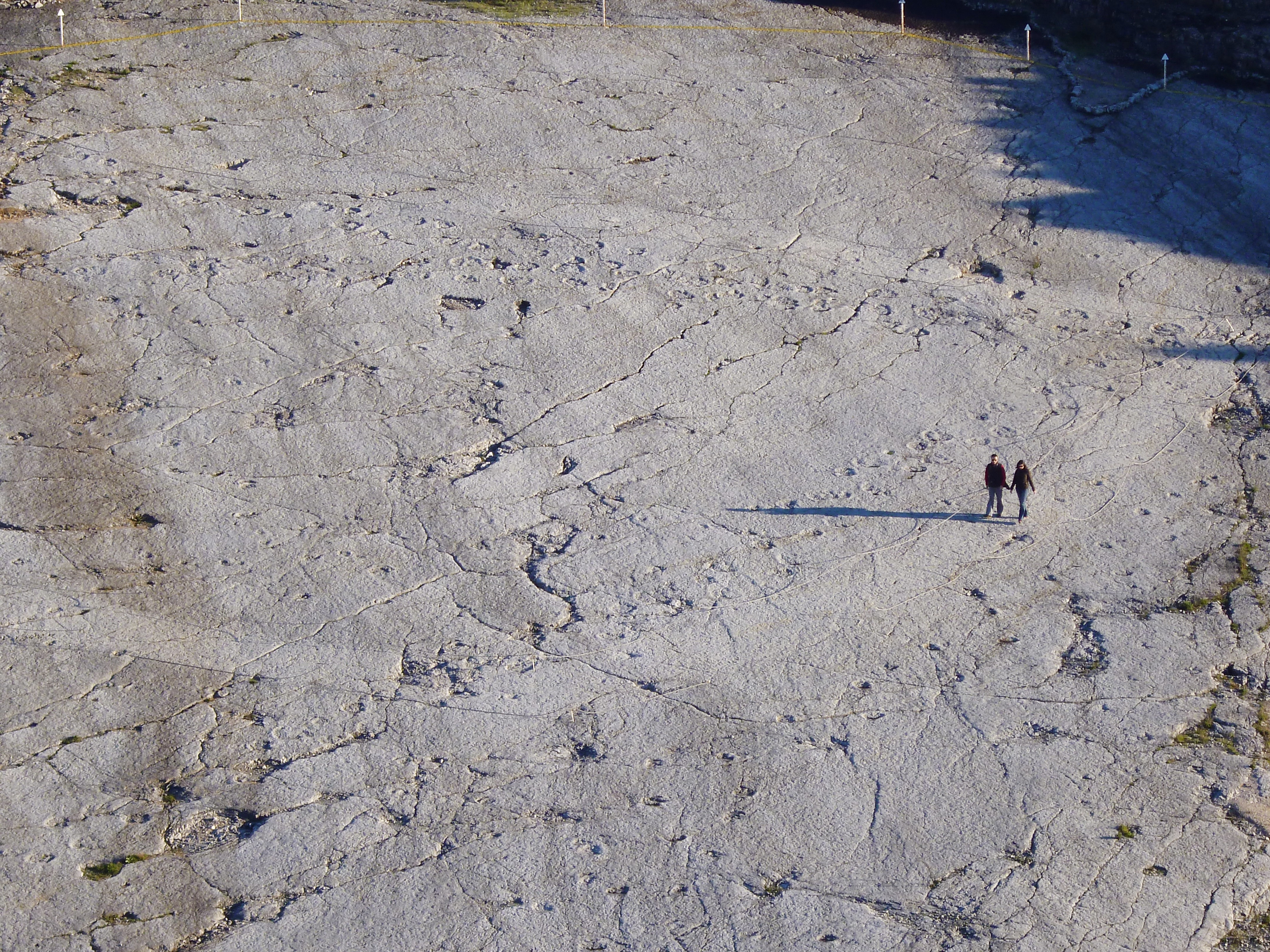
A closer look at some dinosaur trackways.

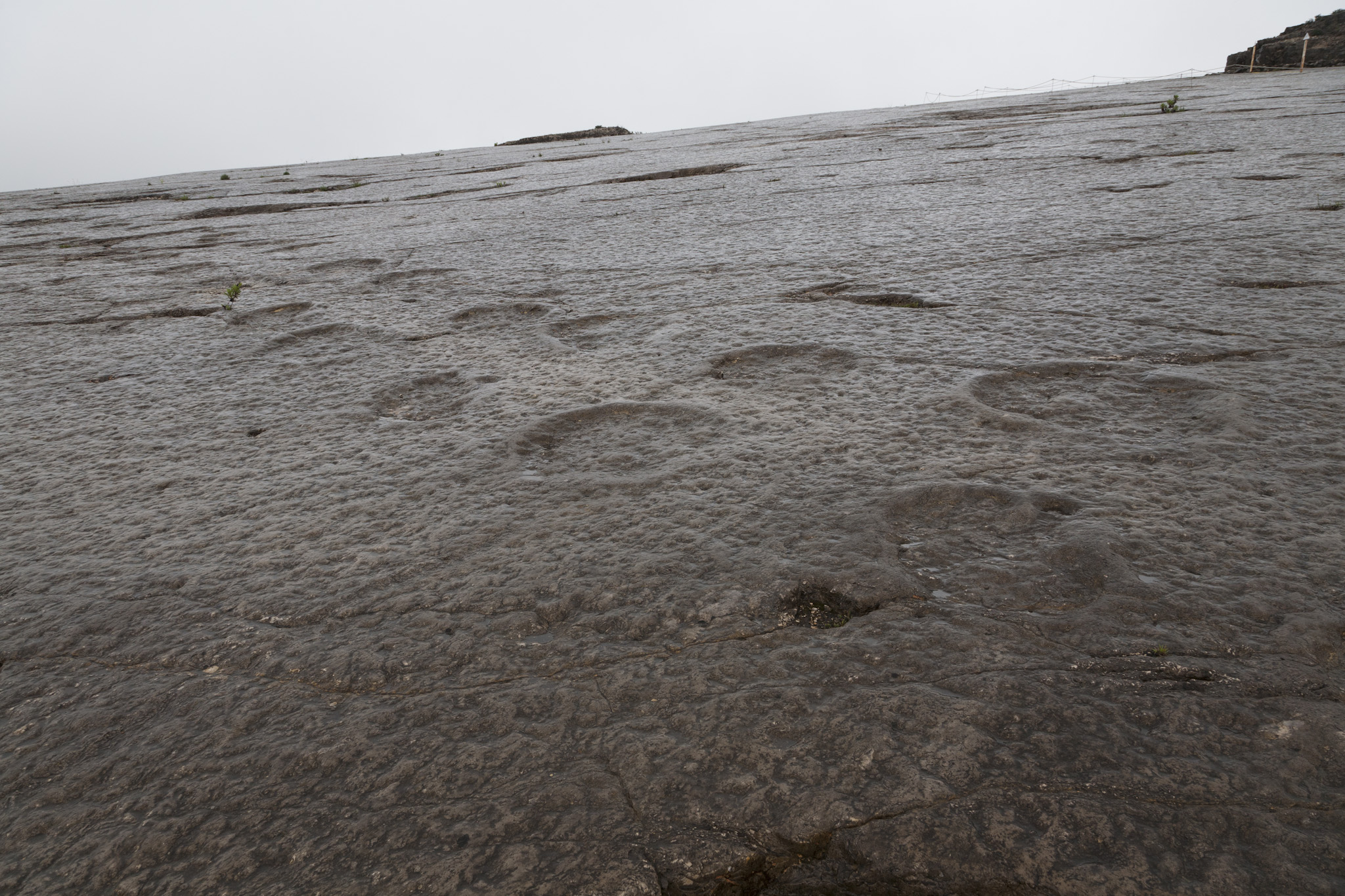
One of the several long sauropod trackways.

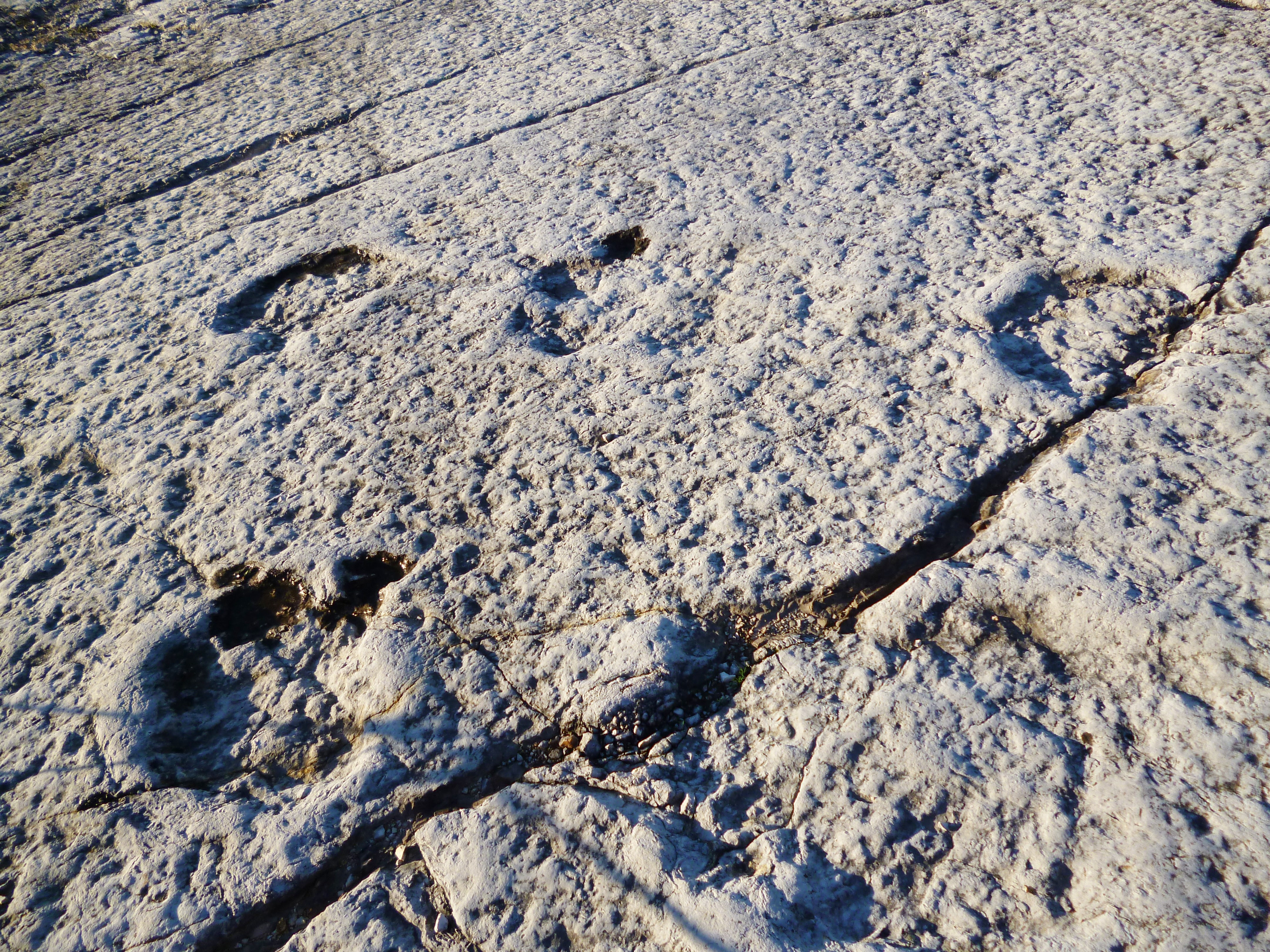
Sauropod footprints along a major trackway.

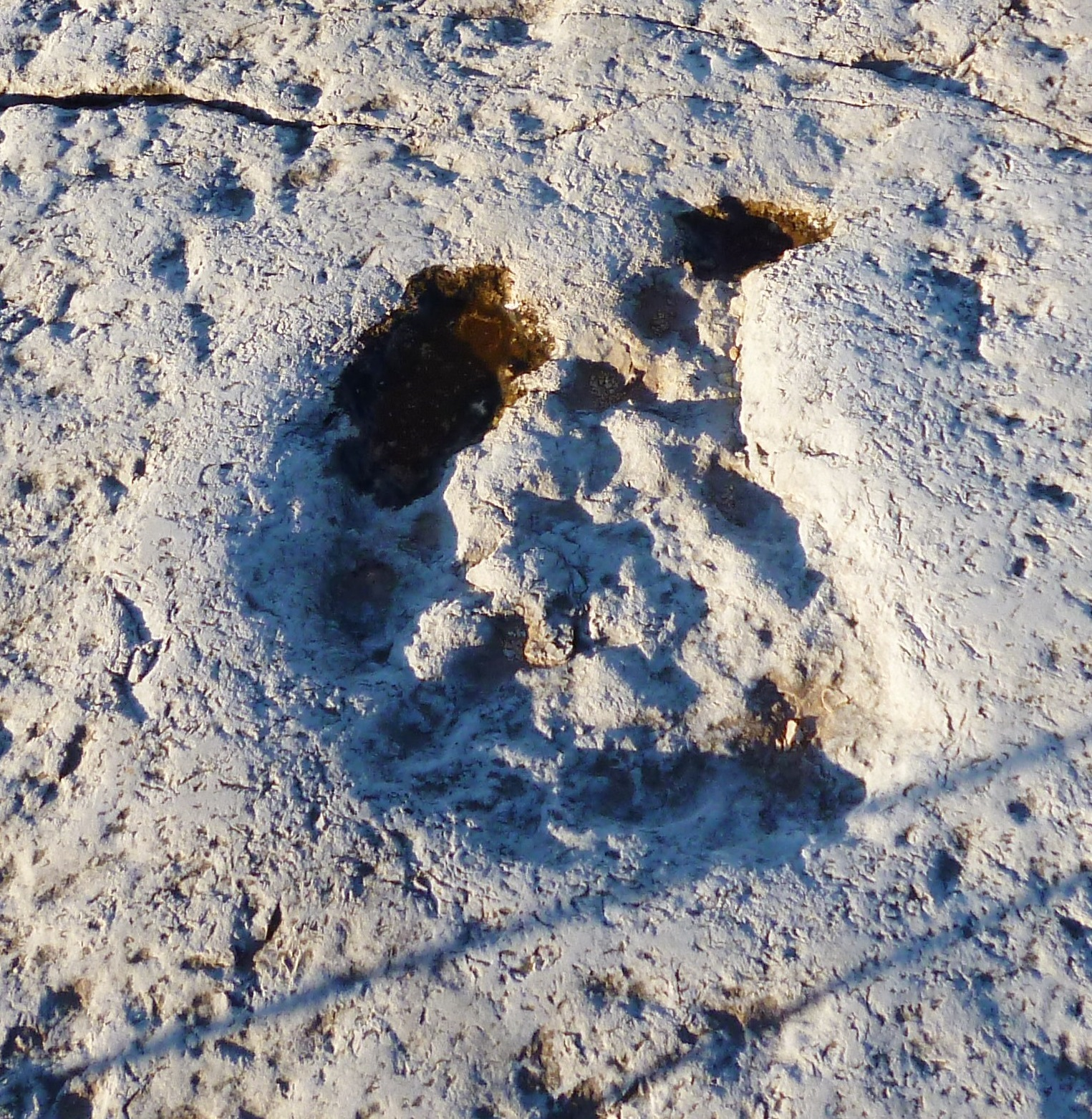
A sauropod manus print showing a claw and digit impressions.

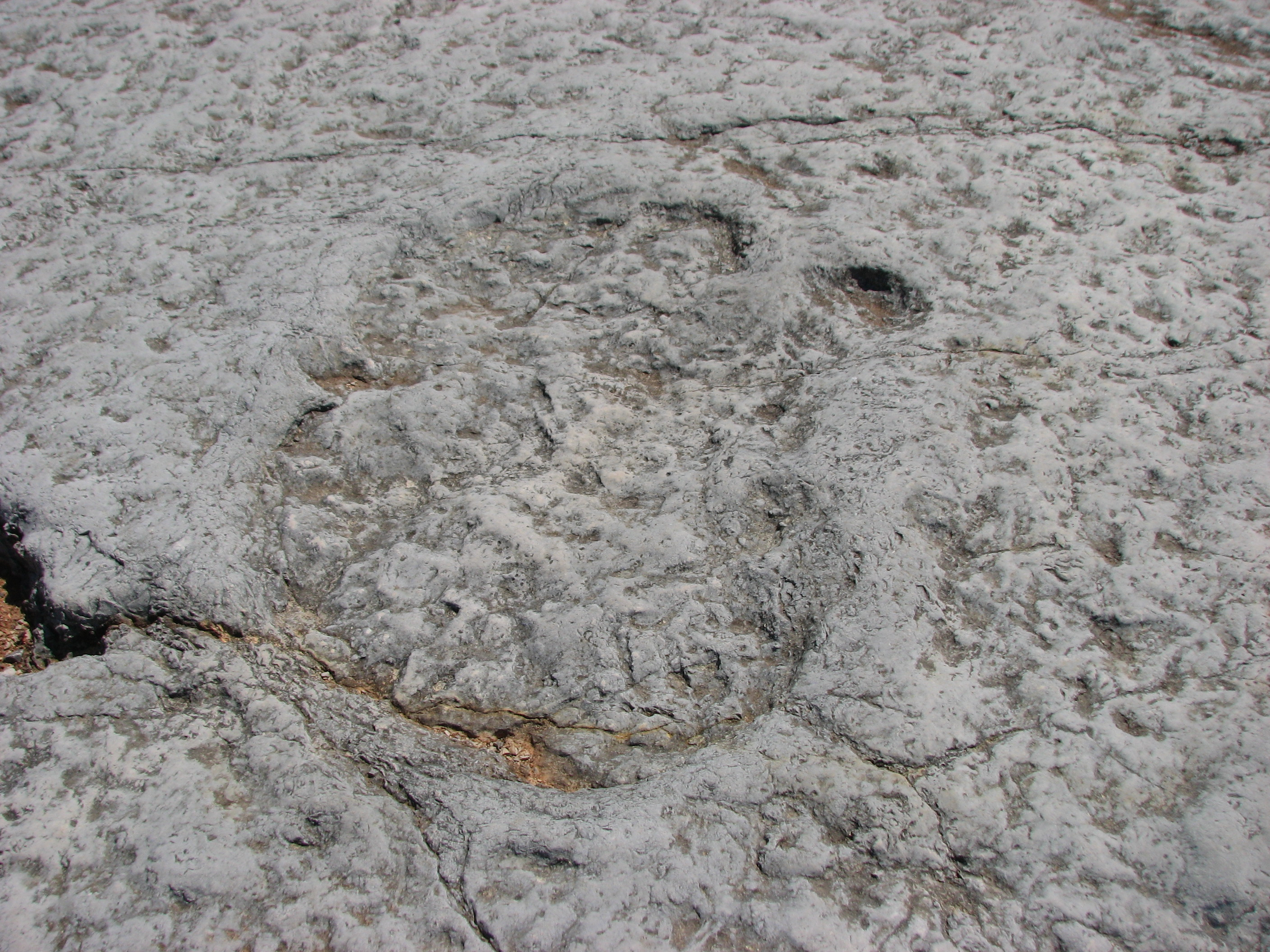
A sauropod pes print showing digit impressions.

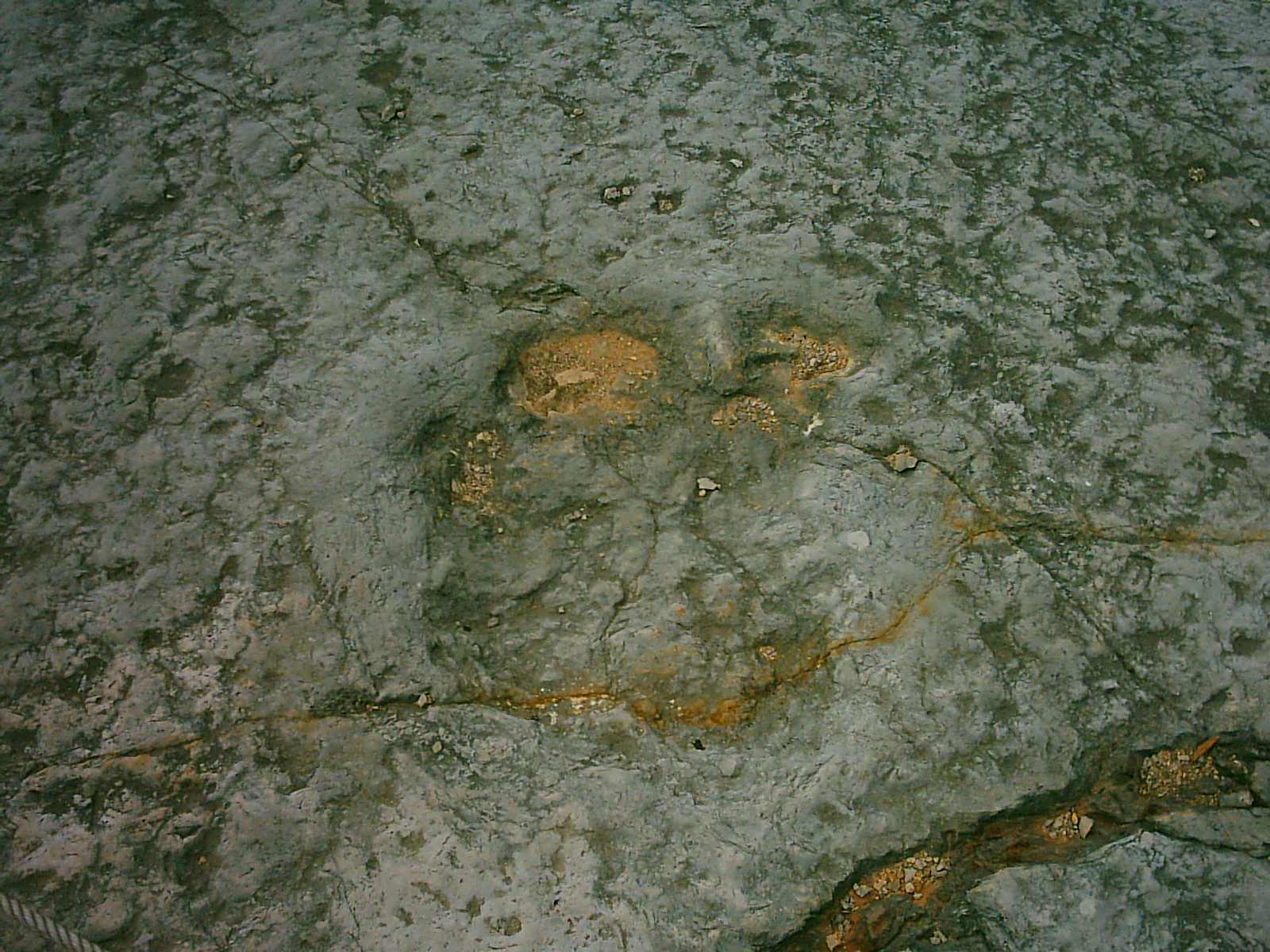
A dinosaur footprint.

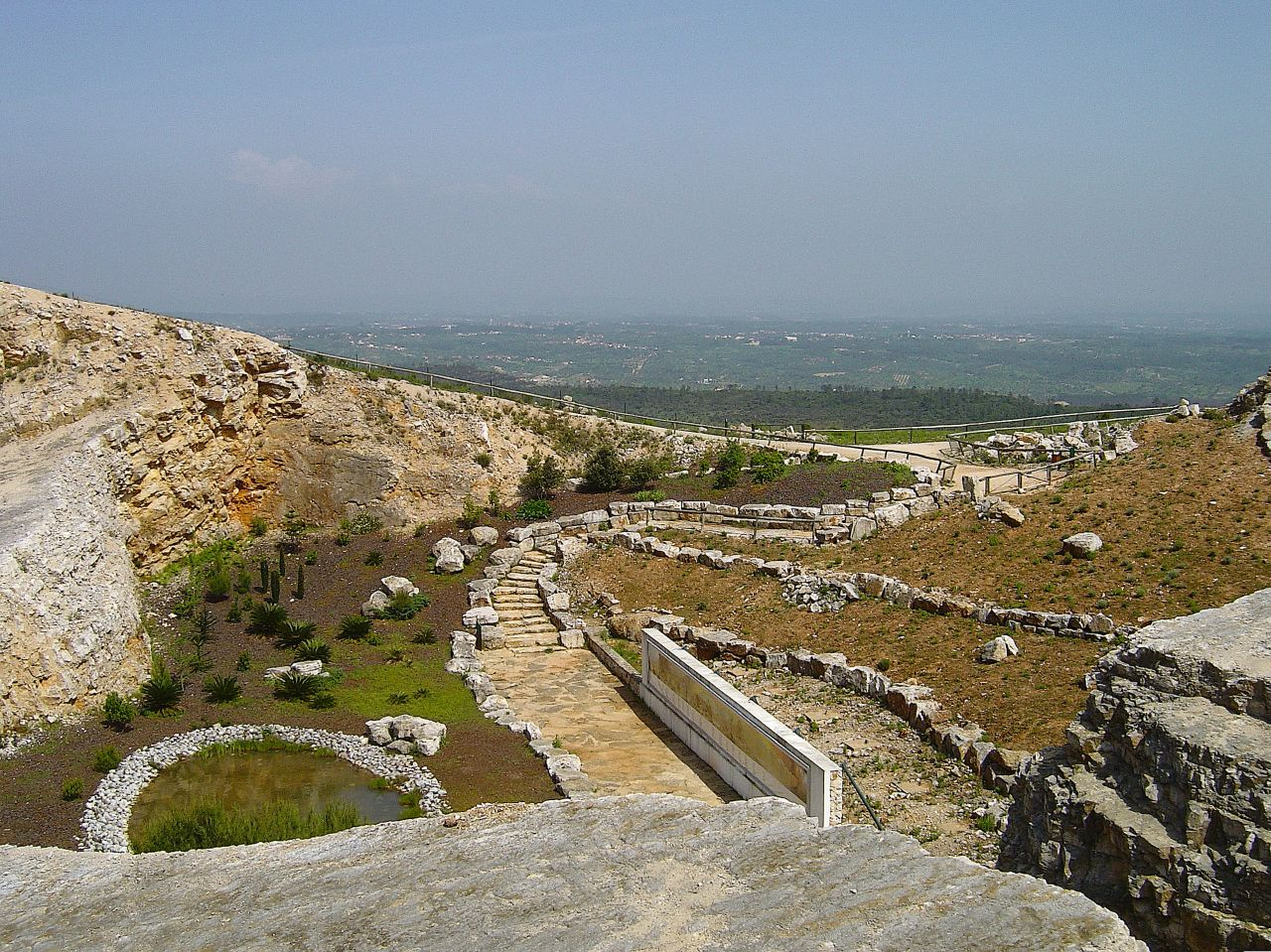
The garden around the quarry site presents some living fossils of the Jurassic Period.
