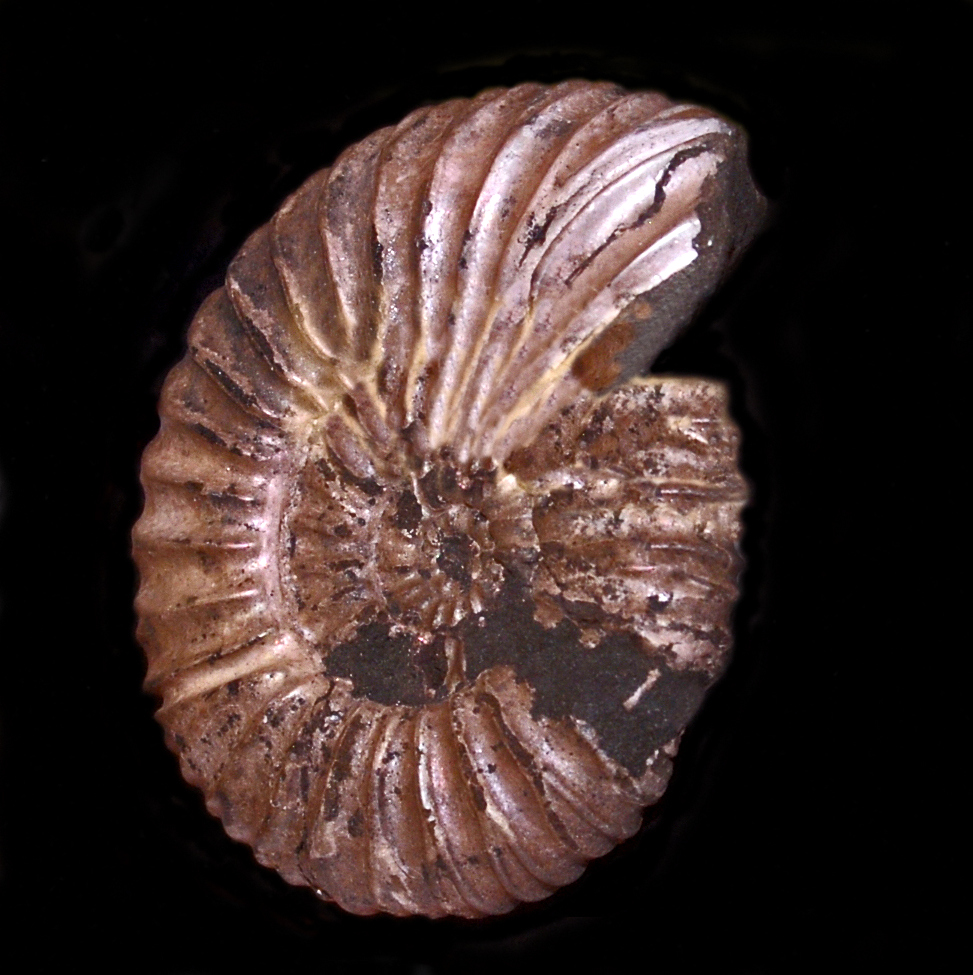
- Fossil of Pachysphinctes adelus from Jurassic of Russia

Scientific classification
- Kingdom: Animalia
- Phylum: Mollusca
- Class: Cephalopoda
- Subclass: †Ammonoidea
- Order: †Ammonitida
- Family: †Perisphinctidae
- Genus: †Pachysphinctes; Dietrich 1925

= Pachysphinctes =

Pachysphinctes Temporal range: Kimmeridgian

Genus of molluscs (fossil)

Pachysphinctes is an extinct genus of ammonites belonging to the Perisphinctidae family.

== Fossil record ==
Fossils of Pachysphinctes are found in marine strata of the Jurassic (age range: from 150.8 to 145.5 million years ago.). Fossils are known from some localities in Antarctica, Cuba, Germany, India, Madagascar and Yemen.
