= Vega Formation =

Geological formation in Asturias, Spain

- Stratigraphic range: Kimmeridgian; ~155–151 Ma
- Type: Geological formation
- Unit of: Ribadesella Group
- Underlies: Tereñes Formation
- Overlies: Rodiles Formation
- Thickness: 150 metres

Lithology
- Primary: Sandstone, Mudstone
- Other: Conglomerate

Location
- Coordinates: 43.5°N 5.3°W
- Approximate paleocoordinates: 35.7°N 7.0°E
- Region: Asturias
- Country: Spain
- Vega Formation (Spain) Vega Formation (Asturias)

The Vega Formation is a Late Jurassic (Kimmeridgian) geologic formation of the Ribadesella Group in Asturias, Spain. Dinosaur remains diagnostic to the genus level are among the fossils that have been recovered from the formation. The formation is around 150 metres thick and consists of "alternating white, pale grey and reddish sandstones, and red mudstones with several sporadic conglomeratic beds typically arranged in minor finnig-upward cycles within a major cycle of the same character". The Vega Formation shows a degree of lateral equivalency to the Late Kimmeridgian to Tithonian Miyares Formation,suggest a degree of time equivalency.

== Paleofauna ==
Dinosaurs of the Vega Formation
Genus	Species	Notes
cf. Torvosaurus	Indeterminate	A giant megalosaurine. Regarded as possible specimens of Torvosaurus.
Dacentrurinae indet.	Indeterminate	An indeterminate dacentrurine stegosaurian.
Camarasauridae indet.	Indeterminate	An indeterminate camarasaurid.
cf. Turiasaurus	Indeterminate	Assigned to Turiasaurus.

== See also ==
- List of dinosaur-bearing rock formations
  - List of stratigraphic units with few dinosaur genera
- Lastres Formation, contemporaneous fossiliferous formation of Asturias
