= Aulacosphinctes =

Aulacosphinctes Temporal range: Tithonian

Scientific classification
- Kingdom: Animalia
- Phylum: Mollusca
- Class: Cephalopoda
- Subclass: †Ammonoidea
- Order: †Ammonitida
- Family: †Himalayitidae
- Genus: †Aulacosphinctes; Uhlig, 1910

Species
- Aulacosphinctes proximus

Genus of molluscs (fossil)

Aulacosphinctes is an extinct genus of ammonoid cephalopod that lived during the Late Jurassic and had a widespread distribution.

The shell is compressed, covered by strong, distinct, widely bifurcating ribs, some simple, none with tubercles; the venter marked by a deep and persistent groove; lappets rather long. Based on the style of ribbing Aulacosphinctes is included in the Himalayitinae, but could be placed in the Beriasellinae. Aulacosphinctes has been found in the Upper Jurassic (Tithonian) sediments in Algeria, east Africa, India, South America, and possibly California.

Related genera include Hemisphincites, Dickersonia, Durangites, and Himalyites.
