= Tizi-n-Aït tracksite =

Tizi-n-Aït tracksite is a fossil trackway location in Morocco in the Azilal province. It is Jurassic (Pliensbachian, 189.6 - 183.0 Ma) in age, with tracks attributed to sauropods or stegosaurs, and an unidentified carnosaur. The tracksite is part of the Aganane Formation and the tracks are located at base of formation.
