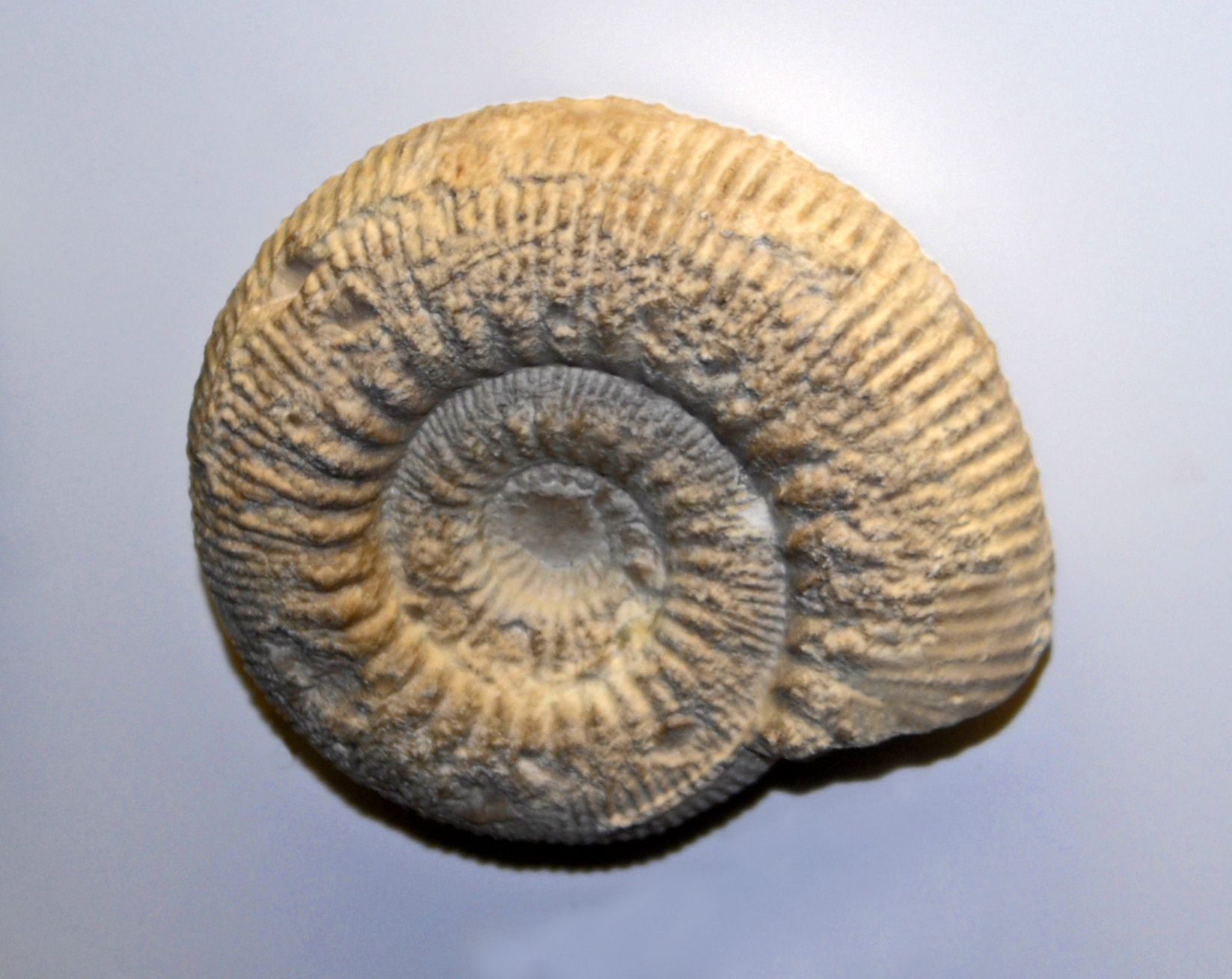
- Fossil specimen of Virgatosphinctes species from Upper Jurassic

Scientific classification
- Kingdom: Animalia
- Phylum: Mollusca
- Class: Cephalopoda
- Subclass: †Ammonoidea
- Order: †Ammonitida
- Family: †Perisphinctidae
- Genus: †Virgatosphinctes

= Virgatosphinctes =

Genus of molluscs (fossil)

Virgatosphinctes is an extinct genus of ammonites, which lived in the Tithonian stage of the Jurassic period, from 150.8 to 140.2 Ma . Its fossils have been found in Antarctica, China, Cuba, India, Nepal, Russia and Yemen.
