= Samana Suk Limestone =

Geological formation in Pakistan

- Stratigraphic range: Middle Jurassic
- Type: Geological formation
- Underlies: Chiehali Formation
- Overlies: Datta Formation
- Thickness: Between 3 centimetres (1.2 in) to over 2 metres (6.6 ft)

Lithology
- Primary: Limestone, dolomitic limestones
- Other: Dolomite, marl and marlstone

Location
- Coordinates: 32°40′30″N 72°47′35″E
- Approximate paleocoordinates: 14.9°N 29.8°E
- Country: Pakistan
- Extent: Western Salt Range

Type section
- Named by: L. M. Davies
- Year defined: 1930
- Samana Suk Limestone (Pakistan)

The Samana Suk Limestone is a Middle Jurassic geological formation in Pakistan, cropping out across the Salt Range from the western side. The formation is thought to have once been a coastal environment. Dinosaur footprints and ammonites found in close proximity support this reading, and the sediments themselves were laid down across three distinct settings: open marine, lagoon and beach.

== Fossil content ==
Ammonites and belemnites are common within the Samana Suk Limestone. Indeterminate remains attributed to Dinosauria indet. and Theropoda indet. have also been recorded from the formation.

=== Dinosaur footprints ===
A trackway of fifteen dinosaur footprints, known as the Mianwali trackway, was identified at Baroch Nala, Malakhel, near Mianwali by Muhammad Sadiq Malkani in 2006 and described the following year. It comprises four footprints attributed to a megalosauroid ("Samanadrinda surghari") and eleven to a sauropod ("Malakhelisaurus mianwali"). The site is also notable as the first trackway discovered in Asia to preserve wide-gauge sauropod tracks.

The trackway's condition has deteriorated significantly since its discovery. Coal mining and road construction destroyed all four theropod footprints shortly after 2007, and hydraulic machinery accounted for several of the sauropod footprints before 2011.
