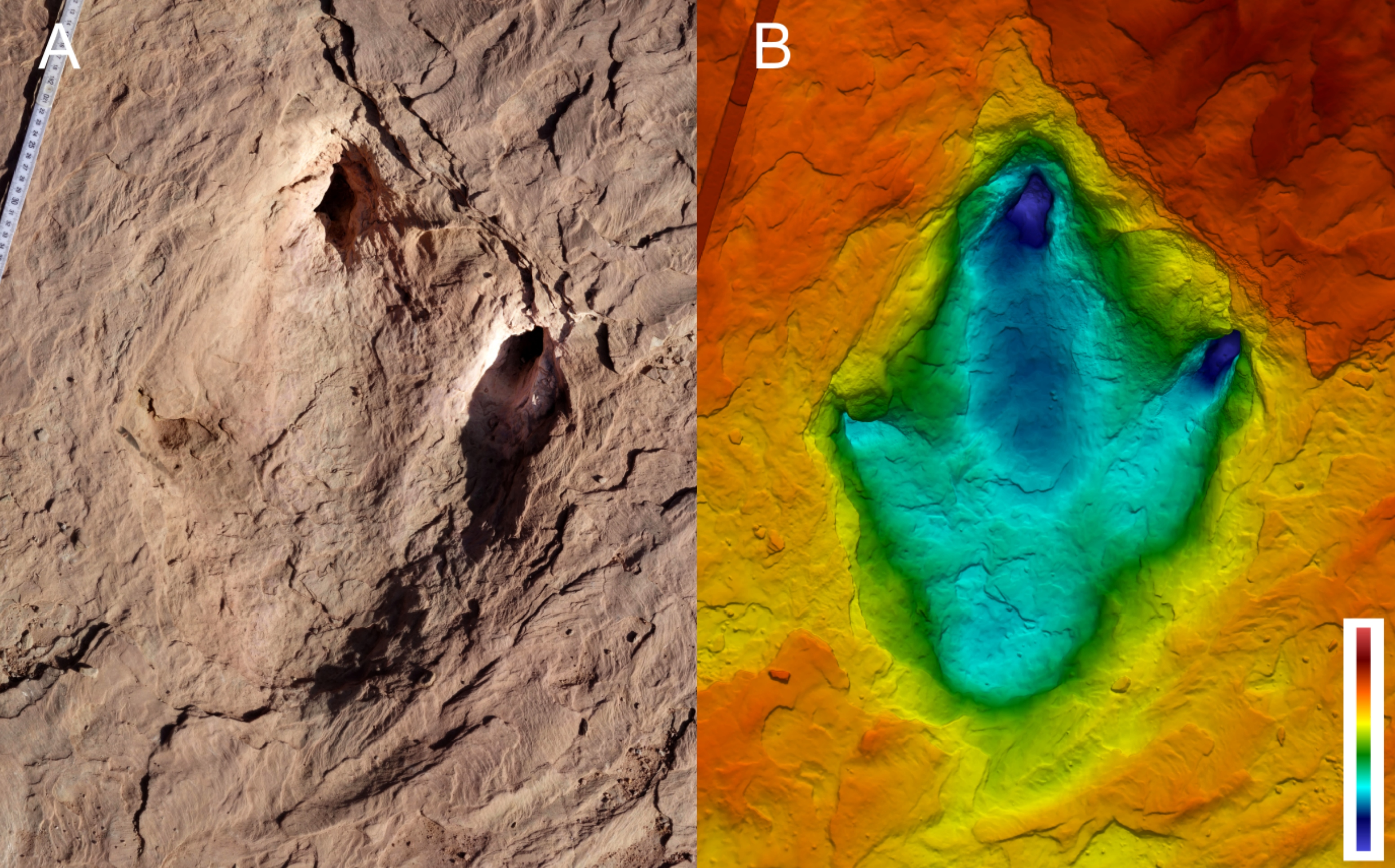
- 3D model of a track from the Copper Ridge dinosaur tracksite in Utah, US

Trace fossil classification
- Kingdom: Animalia
- Phylum: Chordata
- Class: Reptilia
- Clade: Dinosauria
- Clade: Saurischia
- Clade: Theropoda
- Ichnogenus: †Hispanosauropus; Mensink & Mertmann, 1984

= Hispanosauropus =

Dinosaur footprint

Hispanosauropus is an ichnogenus of dinosaur footprint known from the Late Jurassic of Spain and North America.

== See also ==
- List of dinosaur ichnogenera
